= History of Honduras =

Honduras was originally inhabited by many indigenous peoples when the Spanish arrived in the 16th century. The western-central part of Honduras was inhabited by the Lencas, the central north coast by the Tol, the area east and west of Trujillo by the Pech (or Paya), the Maya and Sumo-Tawakah and the South by the Chorotegas. These autonomous groups traded with each other and with other populations as distant as Panama and Mexico. Honduras has ruins of several cities dating from the Mesoamerican pre-classic period that show the pre-Columbian past of the country.

The Spanish founded new settlements such as Trujillo, Comayagua, Gracias, and Tegucigalpa. Starting in the colonial era, the territory of what is today Honduras was part of the Captaincy General of Guatemala, which was also a kingdom integrated into the Viceroyalty of New Spain, dedicated to harvesting, mining, and ranching. After its independence from the Spanish Empire in 1821, Central America joined the First Mexican Empire for a very short time. It fell in 1823 and the Federal Republic of Central America was created, which fell in 1839. After that, the Honduran territory became an independent nation.

There were other attempts to form a new Central American union, though they yielded no results; nevertheless, Honduras remained a relatively closed nation until the Liberal Reform, which drove a series of economic changes, expanded trade and diplomatic ties, and introduced new technologies. The country was heavily influenced by fruit companies that maintained enclaves along the north coast. Honduras remains an independent republic with a presidential system.

== Pre-Columbian era ==
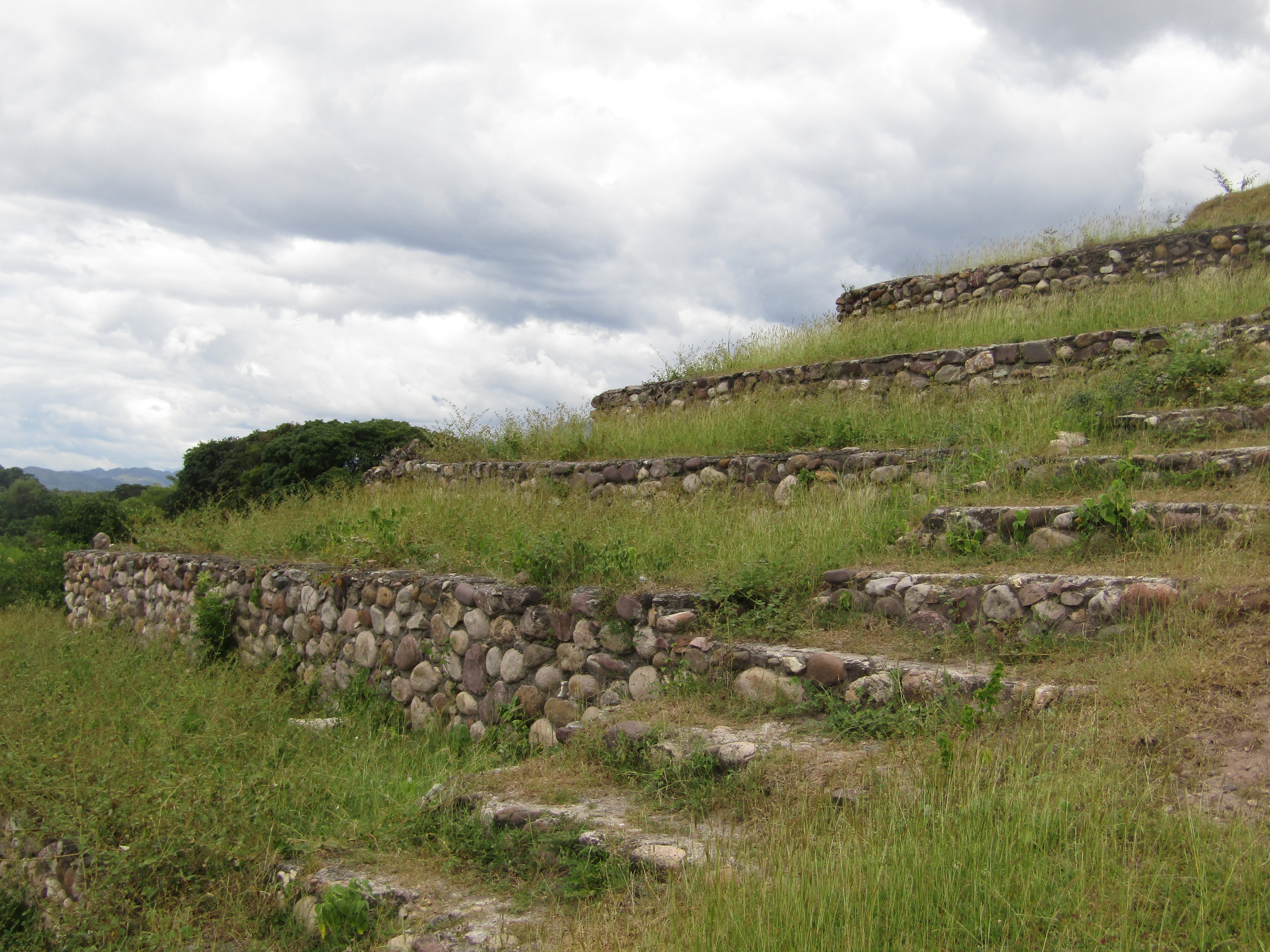
Structure 102 at Yarumela Archaeological Site

Ball Court of Copán.

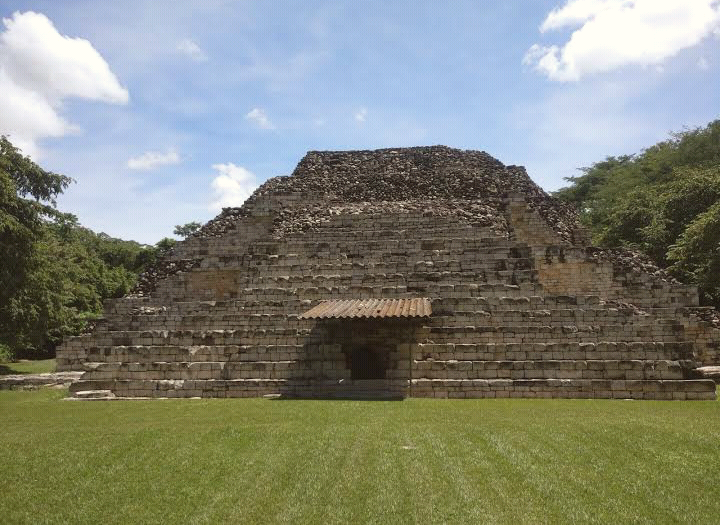
Estructure N.1 at El Puente Archaeological Site

=== Early Precolumbian history ===
Archaeology has demonstrated that Honduras has a multi-ethnic precolumbian history. The oldest evidence of human organizations can be seen in La cueva del Gigante and Talgua caves archeological sites. The ancestors of these peoples were the migrants who crossed the Bering Strait and began to populate the Americas; upon arriving in Honduras, they started establishing tiny, semi-nomadic settlements.

=== Mesoamerican Honduras ===
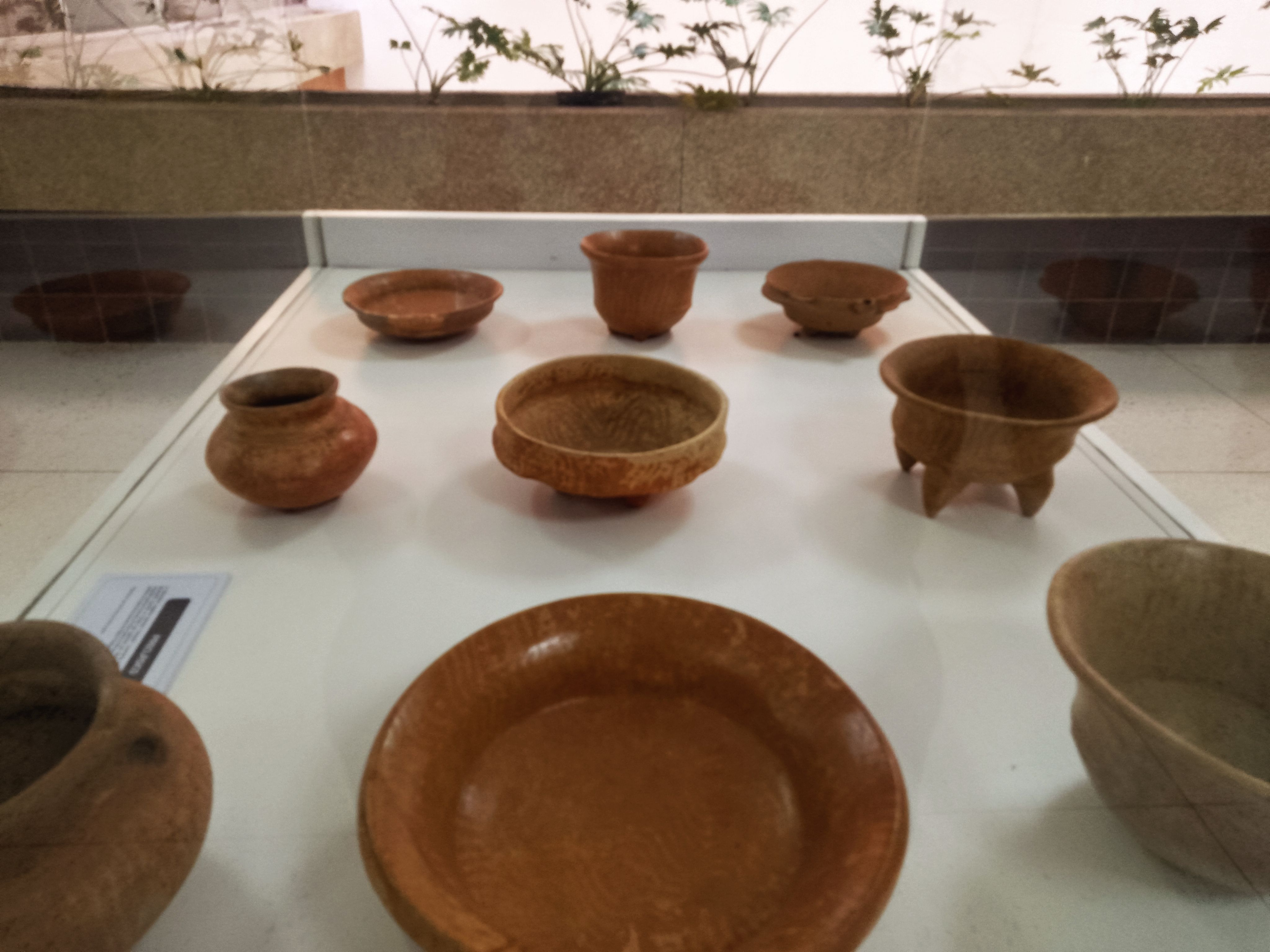
Usultán style ceramic At the Banco Atlántida Museum.

As part of Mesoamerica, Honduras was home to complex settled societies that developed over several thousand years, as in other parts of the region. It is clear that neighboring Maya societies and more distant Central Mexican societies were a major influence on Honduran communities, both through trade (especially with the Maya civilization, and, during the Formative Period, and the Olmec civilization) and occasionally migration.

For example, during internal conflict in the late Toltec Empire around 1000 to 1100 AD, Nahuatl speakers migrated from Central Mexico and dispersed into different parts of Central America, including Honduras, especially Chapagua. In present-day El Salvador, they became the Pipil and founded Kuskatan, and in Nicaragua, they became the Nicarao.

==== Arrival of the Lencas and early cities ====
Lencan statue found at Los Naranjos archaological site.

It is not known exactly when the ancestors of the Lenca people began arriving in Honduras, although it is said that this may have started around 2000-1500 BC; upon settling and becoming a sedentary society, they began establishing settlements and were influenced primarily by the Olmecs in terms of architecture.

Los Naranjos north of Lake Yojoa, and Yarumela in the Comayagua valley are ones of the most known settlements built by the ancestors of the Lenca people, some of this during the pre classic period almost 1000 years before the Mayan cities. Over time, their ceremonial centers and urban landscape began to achieve greater complexity.

Thanks to locations that made them active centers of commerce, with access to both the Caribbean and the Pacific. The prosperity of this early Lencas is evident in their structures which some measuring approximately 100 long by 70 meters width; these also demonstrate a hierarchical social organization dating back to very early times, as well as wealth derived from commercial activity linking the two cultural regions that converge in Honduras.

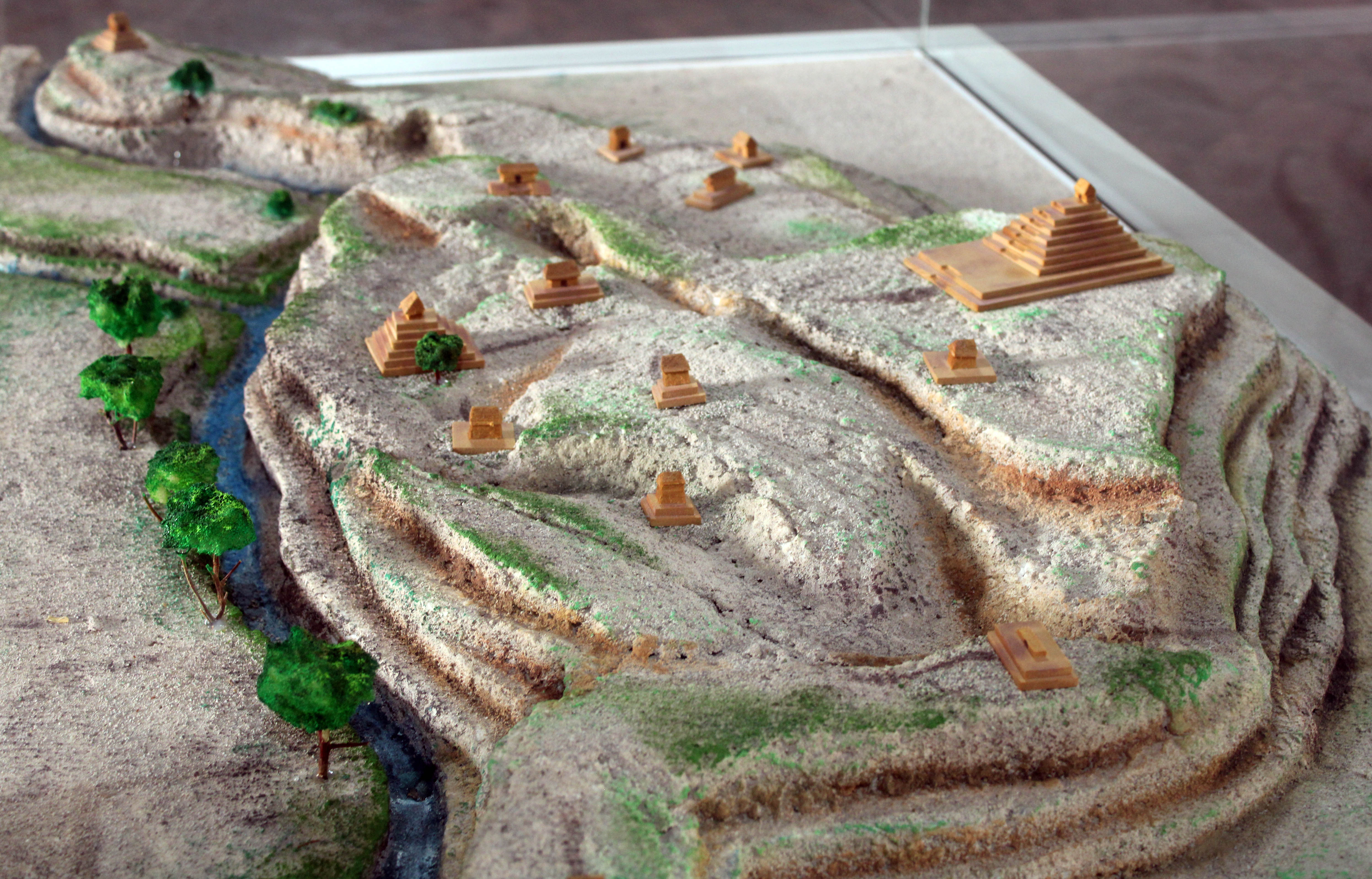
A scale model showing the structures of Yarumela ceremonial center, located at the Comayagua Regional Museum of Archaeology.

Imports of merchandise from Guatemala and central Mexico, and traces of products that came from other areas of South America through trade routes have also been found. The Lencas dominated most of western and central Honduras, and had several villages in the valleys. The Lenca were the biggest and most well organized society in terms of military organization by the time of the conquest in the early 16th century.

==== Mayan arrival ====
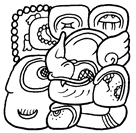
Mayan representative hieroglyphic of the Yax Kuk Mo Dynasty that later would become the emblem of the Kingdom of "Oxwitik" also known as Copán.

An important part of the precolumbian honduran history was the Mayan presence around Copán a large portion of western Honduras near the Guatemalan border, a major Mayan city that began to flourish around 150 A.D. but reached its zenith in the Late Classic period (700–850 A.D.). It has left behind many carved inscriptions and stelae. The ancient kingdom, named Xukpi or Oxwitik, existed from the 5th century to the early 9th century, and had antecedents going back to at least the 2nd century, a period named "predynastic Copán".

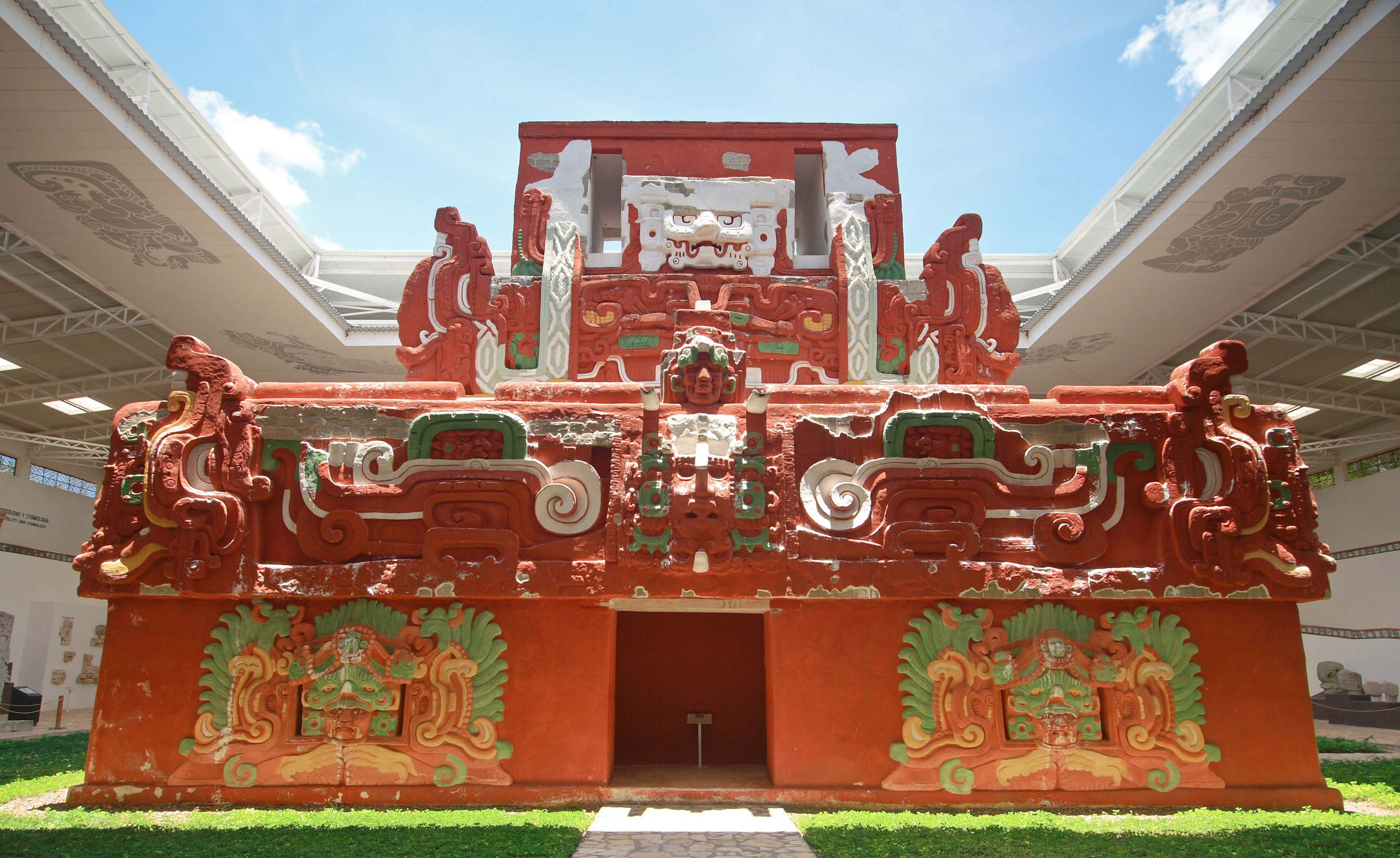
Rosalila temple replica at the Statute Museum of Copán.

Mayan culture extended from what today are the departments of Copán, Ocotepeque, north Santa Barbara and several villages around these territories, especially near the Ulua river. Other Mayan archeological sites in Honduras are El Puente, a smaller city that initially was independent for a period, but maintained a close alliance with the political and administrative center of Copán, and Rio Amarillo, believed to have been a crossing between the valleys of El Florido in Honduras and El Motagua in Guatemala.

The Rastrojón archeological site, shows the construction styles of the residences of the upper or noble class of the Mayan society. The arrival of the Maya and especially the founding of Copán marked a profound shift in the power centers within the territory that is now Honduras, as the city and its vassal settlements became the region's primary hubs of power and influence, an influence that extended further south.

==== Mayan decline ====
The Mayan civilization began a marked decline in population in the 9th century, but evidence shows people still living in and around the city until at least 1200. The precise reasons for the fall of the city of Copán remain unknown, though most experts agree it resulted from a combination of factors such as continuous warfare, the influx of refugees from other collapsed cities, new diseases, and agricultural issues that played a significant role in its decline and eventual abandonment; this left smaller Maya cities in western Honduras unprotected and vulnerable.

The collapse of Maya civilization in Honduras created a power vacuum during the Epiclassic period; the Lenca people of central Honduras sought to fill this void by founding the city of Tenampúa around 750 AD. However, filling the gap left by the Maya proved difficult, and it was not until the arrival of the Postclassic period marked by the establishment of new chiefdoms that the region achieved greater relative stability.

By the time the Spanish came to Honduras, the once great city-state of Copán had been overrun by the jungle, and the surviving Ch’orti' were isolated from their Choltian linguistic peers to the west.

=== The Isthmo-Colombian peoples ===
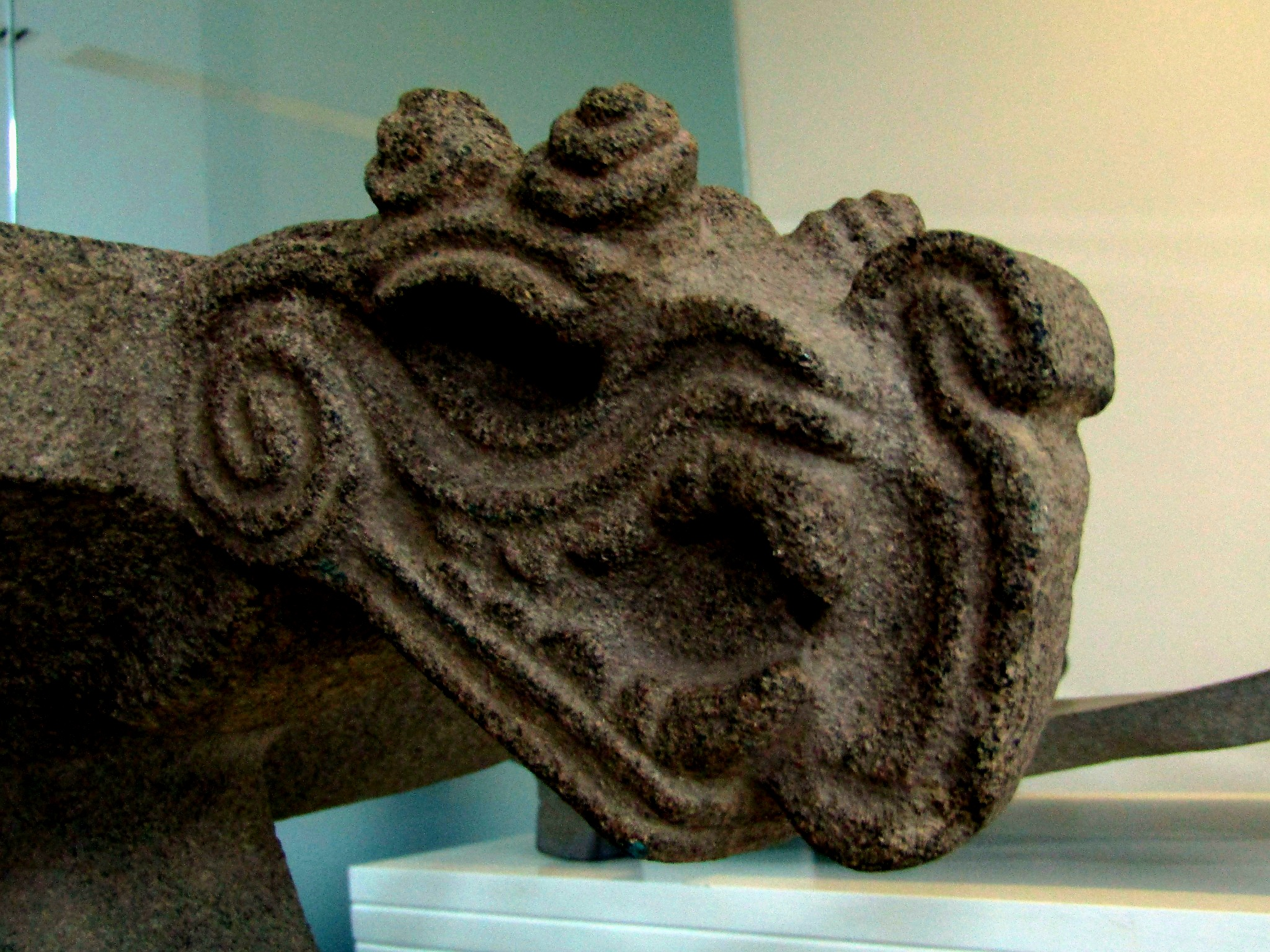
Dragon-head metate belonging to an as-yet-undetermined culture from the Isthmo-Colombian area.

Although most Honduran great urban areas belonged to the Mesoamerican cultural area, La Ciudad Blanca is the major exception. It lies on the very fringe of Mesoamerica and is better described in relation to the Isthmo-Colombian area. This civilization thrived from 500 A.D to 1000 A.D, and included sophisticated management of the environment in accordance with large urban centers.

Despite being outside the Mesoamerican area, studies reveal that the city had mesoamerican elements, like a ball game, and some pyramidal structures similar to the ones found in western Honduras. Studies in the area show huge structures in the city, and one had a ceremonial area where they performed rituals to kings and gods.

Another example of the Ithsmo-columbian peoples is the Pech settlements on Guanaja Island; although the Bay Islands served as a site of interaction between the two cultural areas, the Pech established settlements there, sharing the islands with other groups passing through.

One example is the Plan Grande site, a ceremonial center on the island built between the 600-900 AD that was of great importance to travelers arriving there to trade. Groups such as the Tawahka and Miskito also established smaller settlements, although they led a more semi-nomadic lifestyle; they engaged extensively in fishing and hunting, and traded their catch and game with other peoples via trade routes.

== Conquest period ==
=== Early attempts ===
Honduras was first sighted by Europeans when Christopher Columbus arrived at the Bay Islands very close to the island of Guanaja on 30 July 1502 on his fourth voyage. On 14 August 1502 Columbus landed on the mainland near modern Trujillo. Columbus named the country Honduras ("depths") for the deep waters off its coast.

=== First official campaigns ===
Cristóbal de Olid, who accompanied Cortés in Mexican lands, ventured into Honduran territory.

In January 1524, Hernán Cortés directed captain Cristóbal de Olid to establish a colony in Honduras named "Triunfo de la Cruz", the modern town of Tela. De Olid sailed with several ships and over 400 soldiers and colonists to Cuba to pick up supplies Cortés had arranged for him.

There Governor Diego Velázquez de Cuéllar convinced him to claim the colony he was to found as his own. De Olid sailed to the coast of Honduras and came ashore east of Puerto Caballos at Triunfo de la Cruz where he settled and declared himself governor. Cortés got word of De Olid's insurrection however, and sent his cousin Francisco de las Casas with several ships to Honduras to remove De Olid and claim the area for Cortés. De Las Casas, however, lost most of his fleet in a series of storms along the coast of Belize and Honduras. His ships limped into the bay at Triunfo, where De Olid had established his headquarters.

When De Las Casas arrived at De Olid's headquarters, a large part of De Olid's army was inland, dealing with another threat from a party of Spaniards under Gil González Dávila. Nevertheless, De Olid decided to launch an attack with two caravels. De Las Casas returned fire and sent boarding parties to capture De Olid's ships.

Under the circumstances, De Olid proposed a truce. De Las Casas agreed, and did not land his forces. During the night, a fierce storm destroyed his fleet and about a third of his men were lost. The remainder were taken prisoner after two days of exposure and no food. After being forced to swear loyalty to De Olid, they were released. But De Las Casas was kept prisoner, and soon joined by González, who had been captured by De Olid's inland force.

==== Arrival of Cortés ====
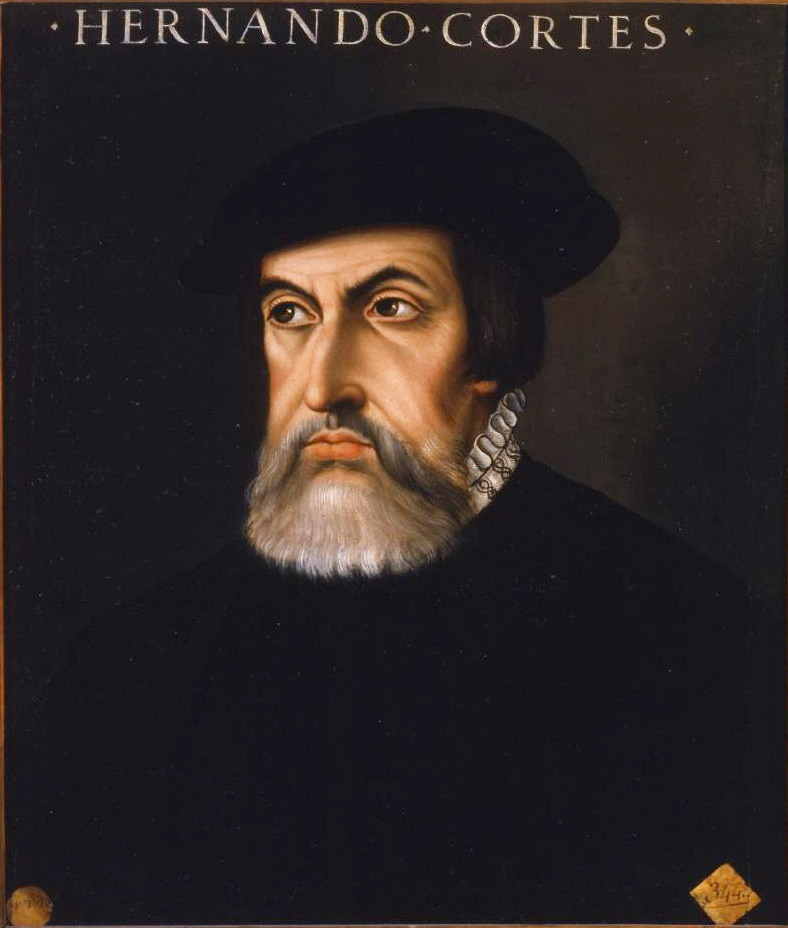
After the fall of Tenochtitlan, Hernán Cortés made his journey to the region of las Hibueras, modern day Honduras.

The Spanish record two different stories about what happened next. Antonio de Herrera y Tordesillas, writing in the 17th century, said that De Olid's soldiers rose up and murdered him. Bernal Diaz del Castillo, in his book named Verdadera Historia de la Conquista de Nueva España, says that De Las Casas captured De Olid and beheaded him at Naco. In the meantime Cortés marched overland from Mexico to Honduras, arriving in 1525.

Cortés ordered the founding of two cities, Nuestra Señora de la Navidad, near modern Puerto Cortés and Trujillo, and named De Las Casas governor. However, both De Las Casas and Cortés sailed back to Mexico before the end of 1525, where De Las Casas was arrested and returned to Spain as a prisoner by Estrada and Alboronoz. De Las Casas returned to Mexico in 1527, and returned again to Spain with Cortés in 1528.

On 25 April 1526, before going back to Mexico, Cortes appointed Hernando de Saavedra governor of Honduras with instructions to treat the indigenous people well. On 26 October 1526, Diego López de Salcedo was appointed by the emperor as governor of Honduras, replacing De Saavedra. The next decade was marked by clashes between the personal ambitions of the rulers and conquerors, which hindered the installation of good government. The Spanish colonists rebelled against their leaders, and the indigenous people rebelled against the Spanish and against the abuses they imposed.

=== Campaigns in the central-western area ===
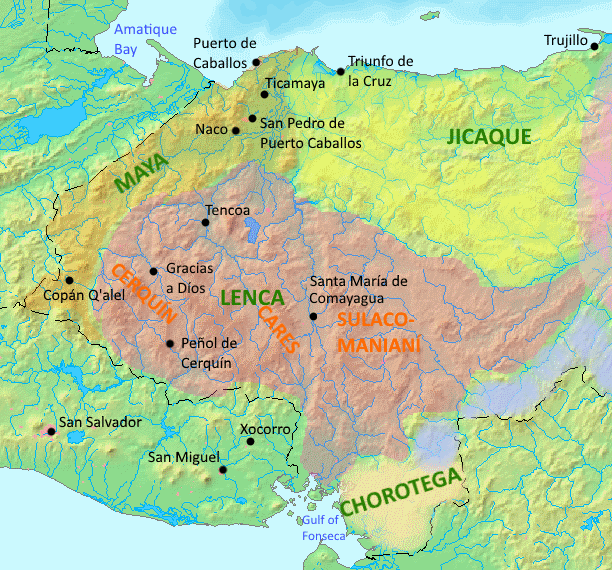
Overview of the territories governed by the Lencas as of 1526.

As the Spanish campaigns progressed, the conquistadors encountered Lenca territories, specifically the chiefdoms of central-western Honduras. The largest of these was the Lordship of Sulaco-Manianí, a federation linking the several chiefs of the villages of present-day Sulaco and Manianí in the Comayagua Valley. These territorial entities were governed by alliances among chieftains from various regions who acted much like great feudal lords and their families; initially, this structure provided them with a strategic advantage. In contrast, the Cares and Perquín chiefdoms were essentially domains ruled by a single leader supported by a priestly and military elite.

De Salcedo, seeking to enrich himself, seriously clashed with Pedro Arias Dávila, governor of Castilla del Oro, who wanted Honduras as part of his domains. In 1528, De Salcedo arrested Pedrarias and forced him to cede part of his Honduran domain, but Charles V, Holy Roman Emperor rejected that outcome. After the death of De Salcedo in 1530, settlers became arbiters of power. Governors hung and removed. In this situation, the settlers asked Pedro de Alvarado to end the anarchy. With the arrival of De Alvarado in 1536, chaos decreased, and the region was under authority.

=== Formalization of Spanish territorial dominion ===
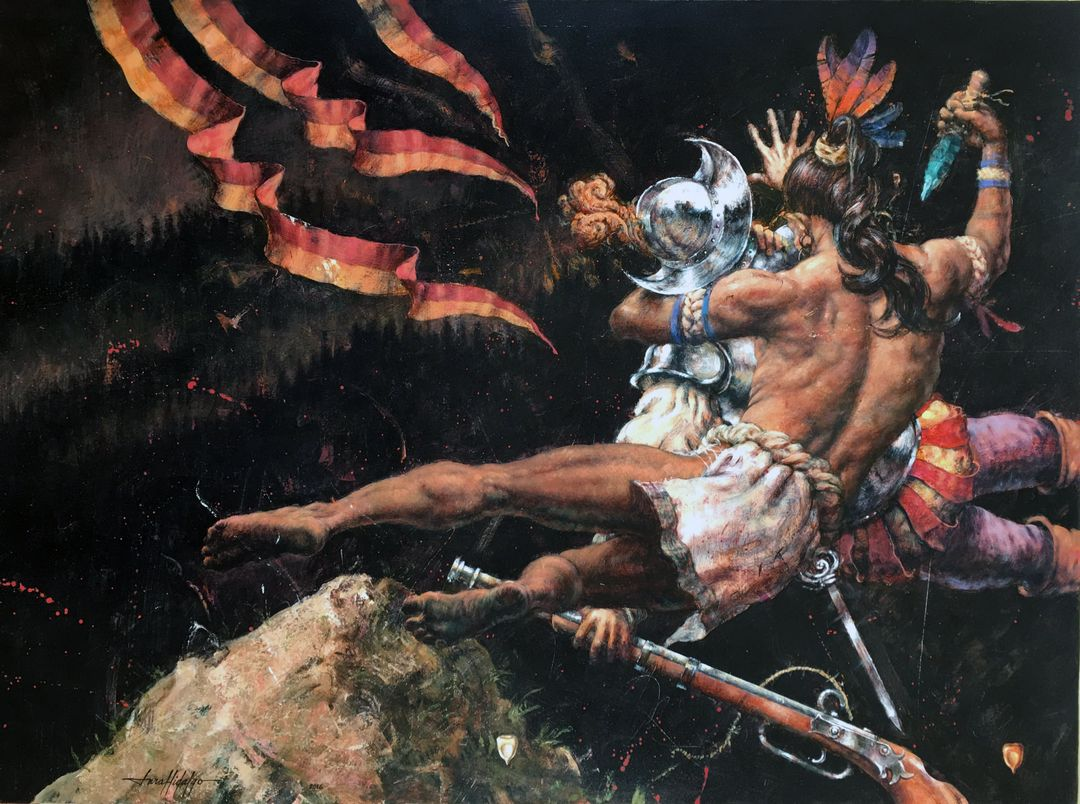
Painting depicting the chief Lempira fighting against a conquistador

In 1537 Francisco de Montejo was appointed governor. He set aside the division of territory made by De Alvarado on arriving in Honduras. One of his principal captains, Alonso de Cáceres, quelled the indigenous revolt led by the cacique Lempira in 1537 and 1538. In 1539 De Alvarado and De Montejo disagreed over who was governor, which caught the attention of the Council of India. De Montejo went to Chiapas, and De Alvarado became governor of Honduras.

During the period leading up to the conquest of Honduras by Pedro de Alvarado, many indigenous people along the north coast of Honduras were captured and taken prisoner to work on Spain's Caribbean plantations in the encomienda system. It was not until De Alvarado defeated the indigenous resistance headed by the chief Çocamba near Ticamaya lagoon that the Spanish begin to go deeper into country in 1536. Alvarado divided the native towns and gave their labor to the Spanish conquistadors as repartimiento. Further indigenous uprisings near Gracias a Dios, Comayagua, and Olancho occurred in 1537–38. The uprising near the current city of Gracias in the eponymous Lempira Department was led by Lempira, who is honored today by the name of the Honduran currency.

== Colonial Honduras ==
First coat of arms of Honduras given by the emperor Charles I of Spain an 5th of the Holy Roman empire. By the time of the colonial era Honduras suffered a demographic change due the arrival of Spanish immigrants

The defeat of Lempira's revolt, and the decline in fighting among rival Spanish factions all contributed to expanded settlement and increased economic activity in Honduras. In late 1540, Honduras looked to be heading towards development and prosperity, thanks to the establishment of Gracias as the regional capital of the Real Audiencia of Guatemala (1544).

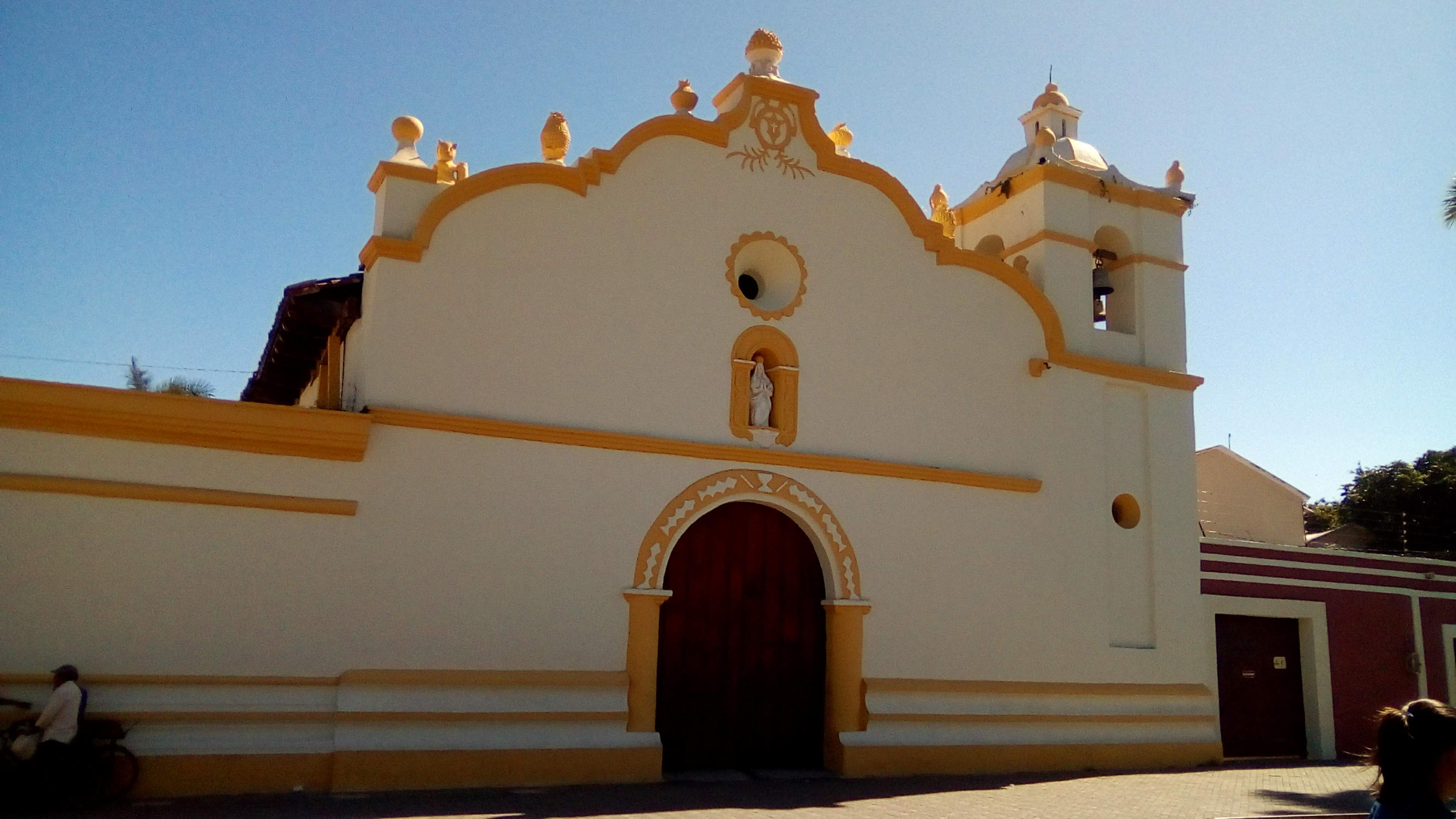
The church of la Merced in the city of Comayagua was the first Cathedral of Honduras in 1550 and is the oldest Honduran church still standing.

However, this decision created resentment in the populated areas of Guatemala and El Salvador. In 1549, the capital was moved to Antigua, Guatemala, and Honduras remained a new province within the Captaincy General of Guatemala until 1821.

=== Colonial mining operations ===
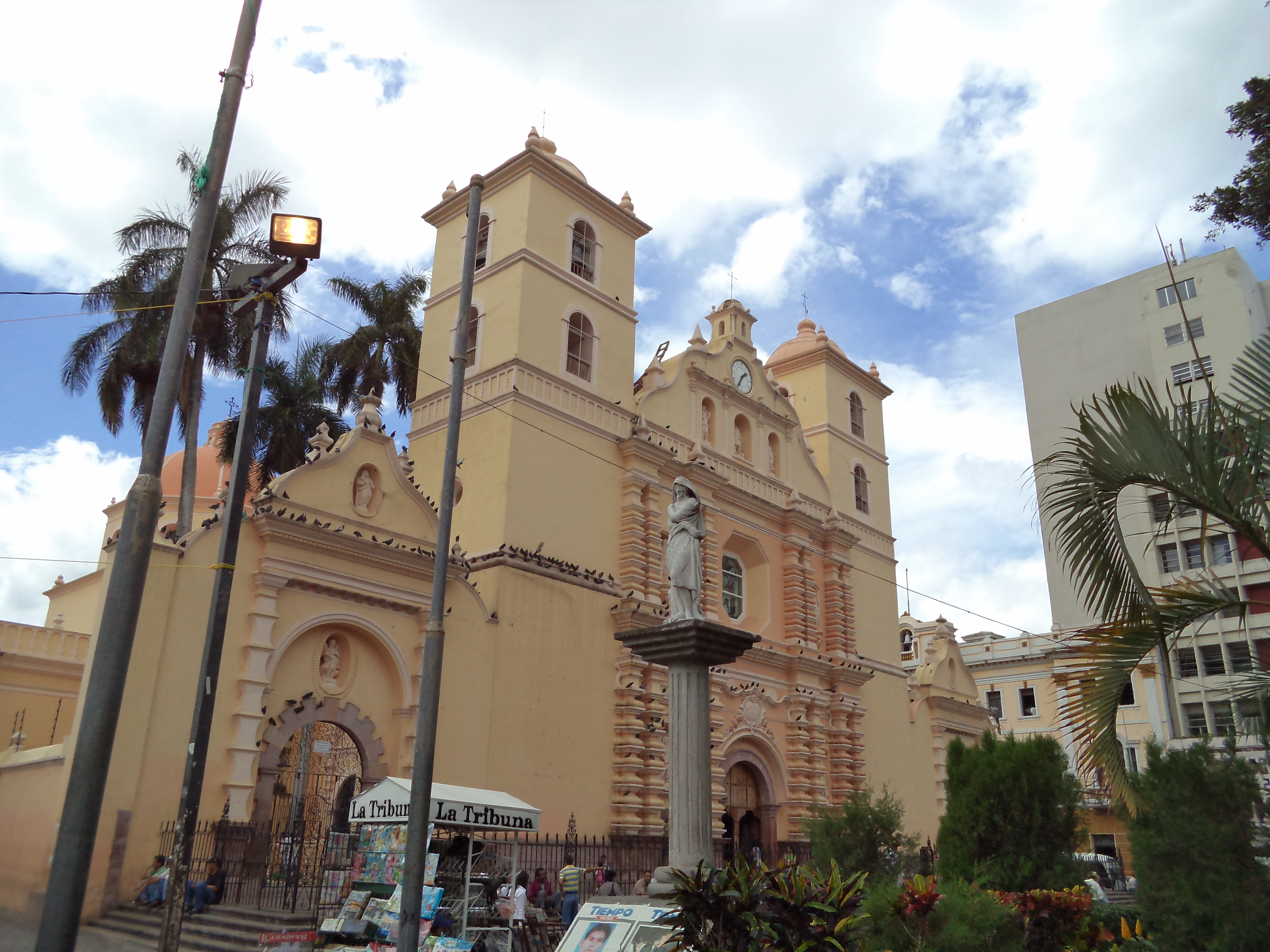
Cathedral of Saint Michael Archangel in Tegucigalpa was built during the XVIII century.

The first mining centers were located near the Guatemalan border, around the city of Gracias in Lempira. In 1538 these mines produced significant quantities of gold for the Spanish crown. In the early 1540s, the center of mining activity shifted eastward to the Río Guayape Valley, and silver joined gold as a major product.

This change contributed to the rapid decline of Gracias and the rise of Comayagua as the center of colonial Honduras. The demands for unfree labor also led to further revolts and accelerated the decimation of the native population. African slavery was introduced into Honduras, and by 1545 the province may have had as many as 2,000 slaves. Other gold deposits were found near San Pedro Sula and the port of Trujillo.

Mining production began to decline in 1560, and thus the importance of Honduras. In early 1569, new silver discoveries briefly revived the economy, which led to the founding of Tegucigalpa, which soon began to rival Comayagua as the most important city of the province. The silver boom peaked in 1584, and economic depression returned shortly thereafter. Honduran mining efforts were hampered by lack of capital and labor, and by difficult terrain. Due to the shrinking size of the indigenous population they used as labor, the Spanish decided to import slaves from Africa for the mines. Mercury, needed to produce of silver, was scarce in Honduras, and its officials were neglectful.

=== Partially conquered northern coast ===
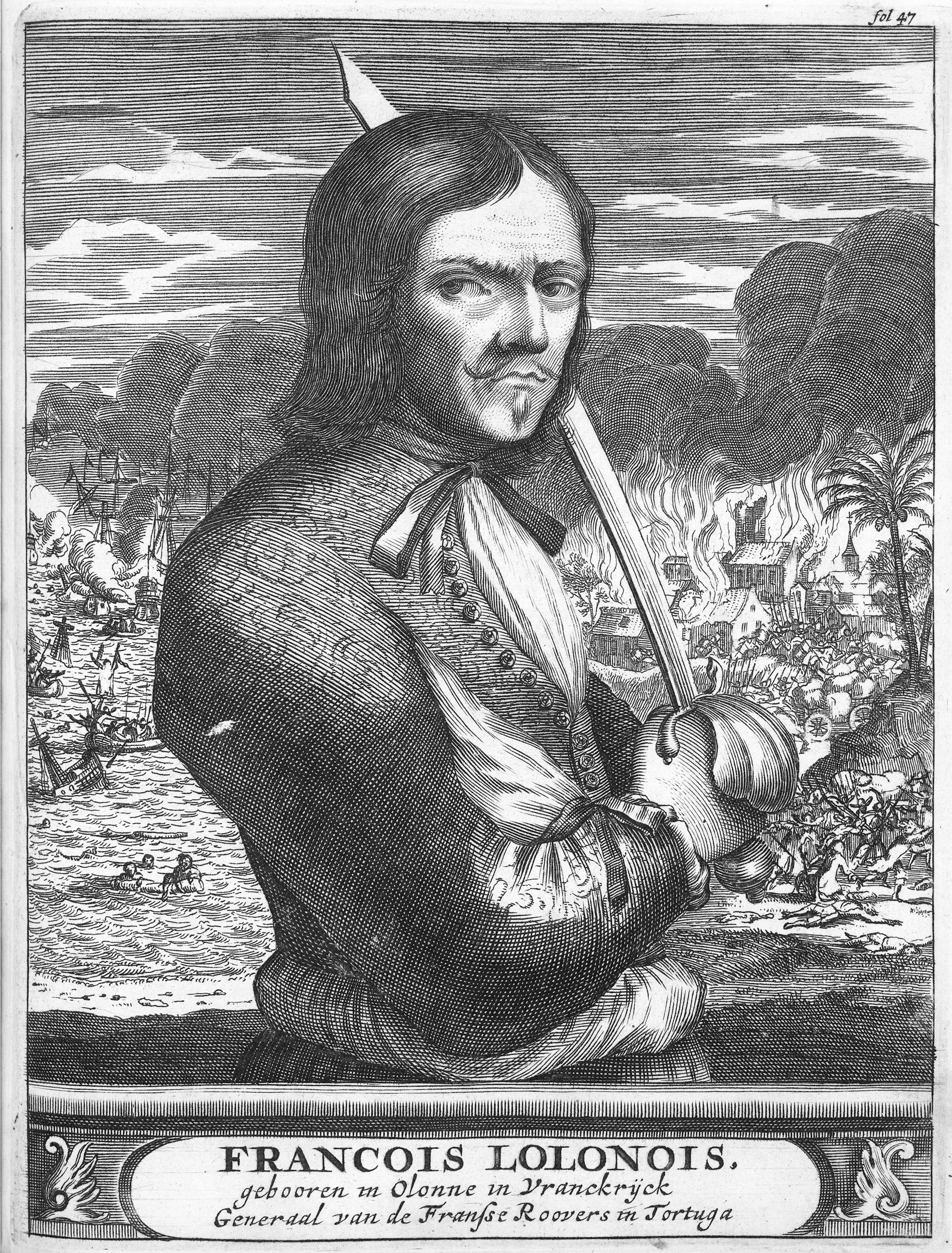
European pirates, especially British, French, and Dutch attacked Honduran towns during the colonial era.

While the Spanish made significant conquests in the western and south regions of Honduras, they had less success on the Caribbean coast, to the north. They founded a number of towns on the coast such as Puerto Caballos in the north west, Trujillo in the north east and sent minerals and other exports across the country from the Pacific coast to be shipped to Spain from the Atlantic ports. They founded a number of inland towns on the north-western side of the province, notably Naco and San Pedro Sula.

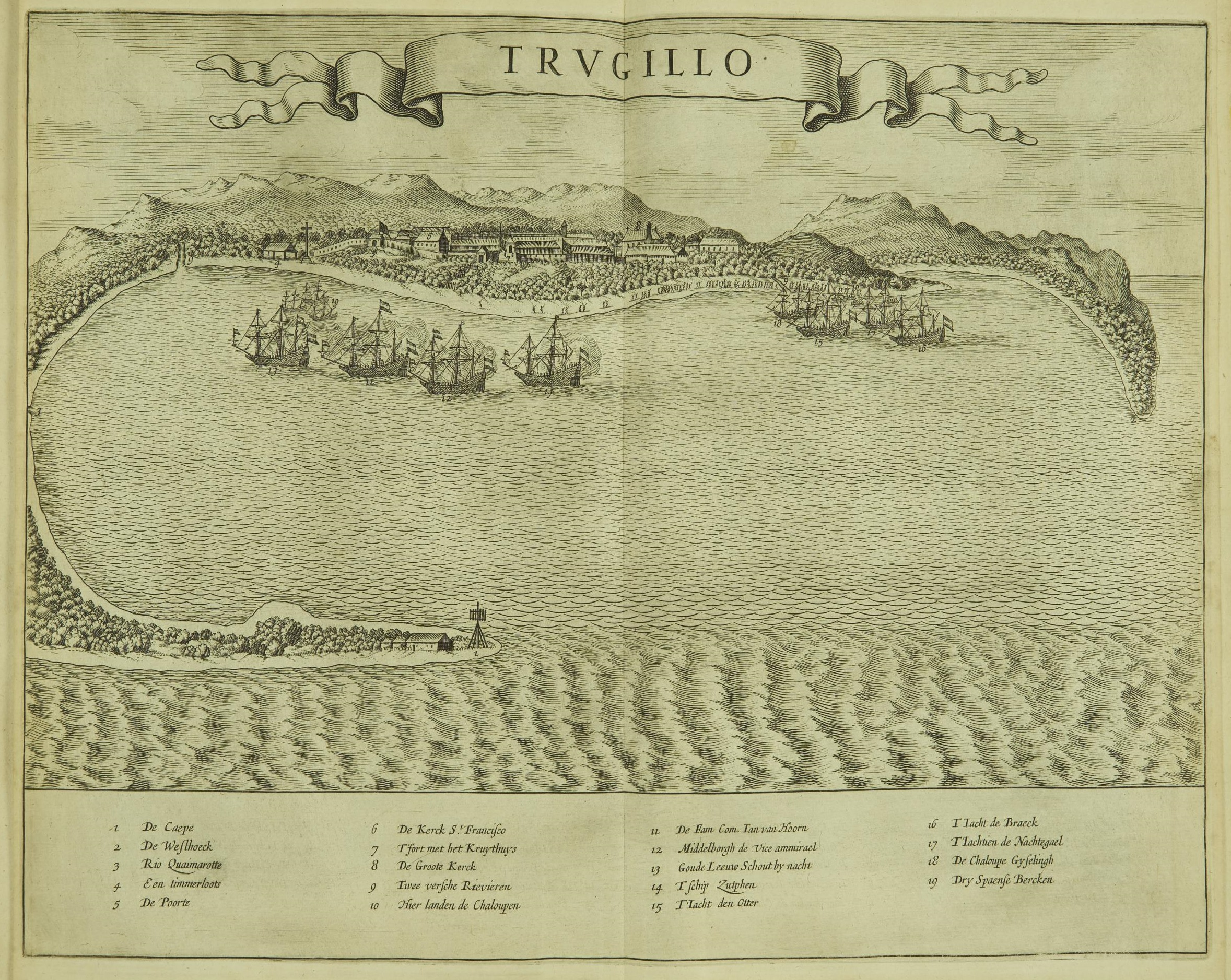
Map of the town of Trujillo from the 16th century.

In the northeast, the province of Tegucigalpa resisted all attempts to conquer it, physically in the sixteenth century, or spiritually by missionaries in the 17th and 18th centuries. Among the groups found along the Mosquito Coast were the Miskito, who although organized in a democratic and egalitarian way, had a king, and hence were known as the Mosquito Kingdom.

One of the major problems for the Spanish rulers of Honduras was the activity of the British in northern Honduras, a region over which they had only tenuous control. These activities began in the sixteenth century and continued until the nineteenth century. In the early years, European pirates frequently attacked the villages on the Honduran Caribbean. The Providence Island Company, which occupied Providence Island not far from the coast, raided it occasionally and had settlements on the shore, around Cape Gracias a Dios. After the conquest of Jamaica in 1655, the king of the Miskito visited England and made an alliance with the English crown. In 1643 an English expedition destroyed the city of Trujillo, Honduras's main port.

=== The British and the Miskito Kingdom ===
The flag of the British protectorate of Mosquitia.

The Spanish sent a fleet from Cartagena which destroyed the English colony at Providence island in 1641, and for a time the presence of an English base so close to the shore was eliminated. At about the same time, however, a group of slaves revolted and captured the ship on which they were traveling, then wrecked it at Cape Gracias a Dios. Managing to get ashore, they were received by the Miskito, which led within a generation to the Miskito Zambo, a mixed-race group that by 1715 had become the leaders of the kingdom.

Meanwhile, the English captured Jamaica in 1655 and soon sought allies on the coast, and hit upon the Miskito, whose king Jeremy visited Jamaica in 1687. A variety of other Europeans settled in the area during this time. An account from 1699 reveals a patchwork of private individuals, large Miskito family groups, Spanish settlements and pirate hideouts along the coast.

Britain declared much of the area a British protectorate in 1740, though they exercised little authority there as a result of the decision. British colonization was particularly strong in the Bay Islands, and alliances between the British and Miskito as well as more local supporters made this an area the Spanish could not easily control, and a haven for pirates.

=== Bourbon reforms ===
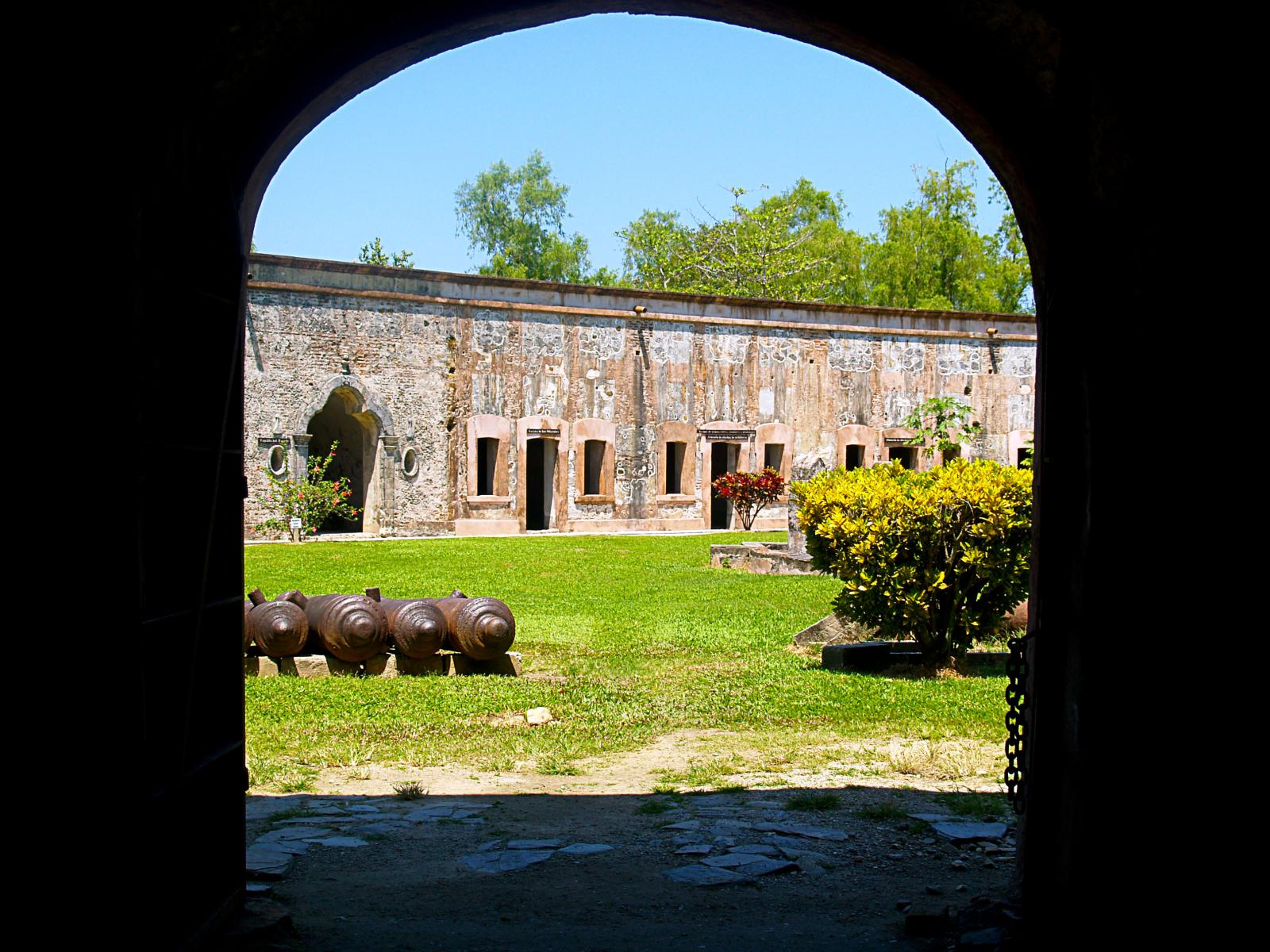
The Fortress of San Fernando de Omoa

In the early eighteenth century, the House of Bourbon, linked to the rulers of France, replaced the Habsburgs on the throne of Spain. The new dynasty began a series of reforms throughout the empire (the Bourbon Reforms), designed to make administration more efficient and profitable, and to facilitate defense of the colonies. Among these reforms was a reduction in tax on precious metals and of the price of mercury, a royal monopoly. In Honduras, these reforms contributed to the resurgence of the mining industry in the 1730s.

One of the effects of Bourbon rule in Honduras was the remodeling of its cities. Honduran towns began to be viewed more as habitable areas requiring greater amenities for their citizens. Beginning with the installation of a sewage system and the construction of waterworks in the city of Comayagua; meanwhile, Tegucigalpa had grown considerably, leading to the expansion of buildings such as cathedrals and administrative centers.

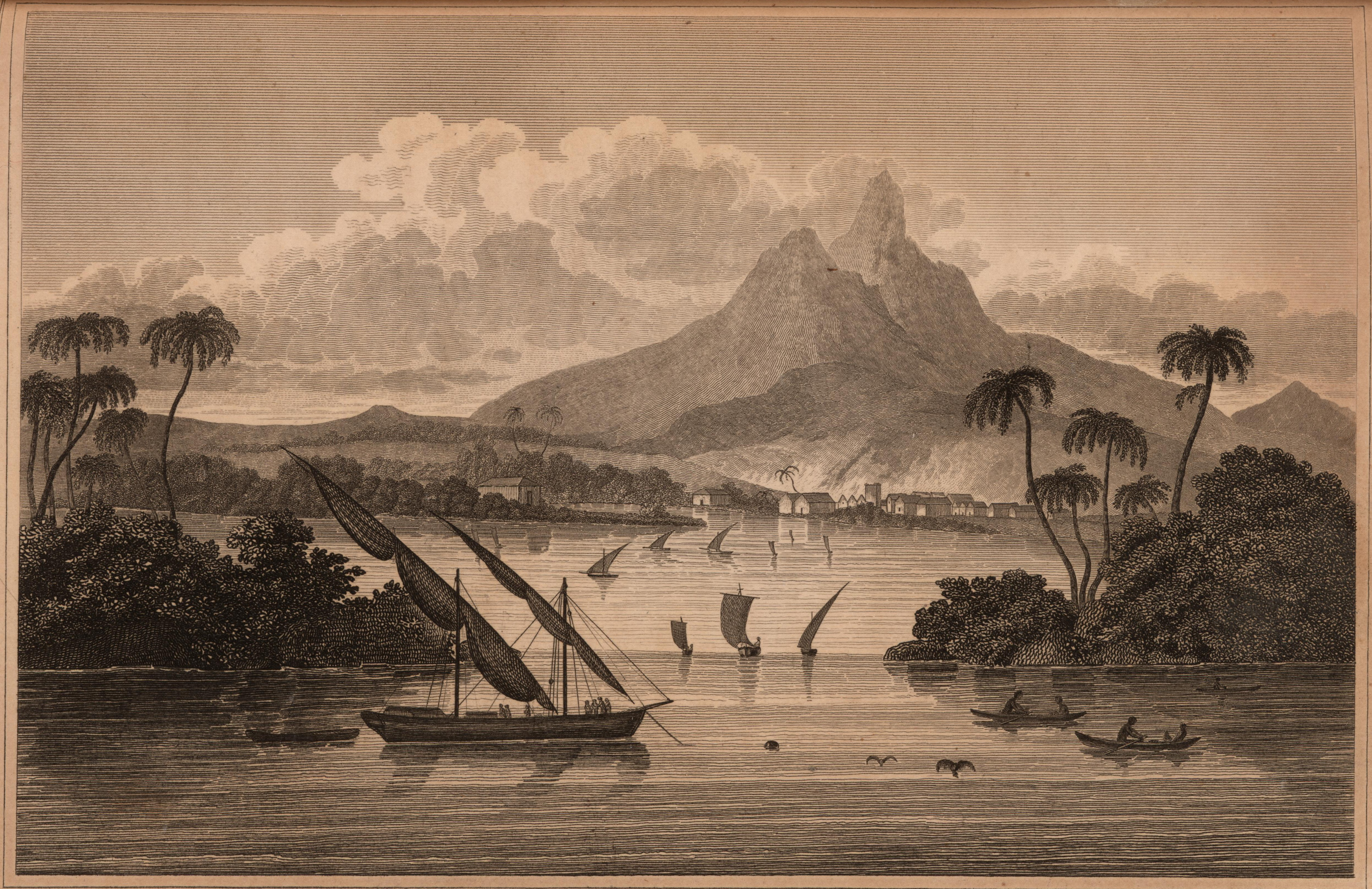
Illustration showing the settlement of Black River, one of the English attempts at colonization in Honduran territory, Said settlement was captured and dismantled by Spanish forces.

Under the Bourbons, the Spanish government made several efforts to regain control of the Caribbean coast. In 1752, the Spaniards built the fort of San Fernando de Omoa which became the largest fortress in Central America. In 1780, the Spanish returned to Trujillo, which started out as base of operations against British settlements to the east. The case of Black River stands out; it was already a settlement of considerable size dedicated to the trade of agricultural and livestock products, and even boasted a small fortification.

During the 1780s, the Spanish regained control of the Bay Islands and took most of the British and their allies in the Black River area. They were not, however, able to expand their control beyond Puerto Caballos and Trujillo, thanks to determined Miskito resistance. The Anglo-Spanish Convention of 1786 issued the final recognition of Spanish sovereignty over the Caribbean coast.

== 19th century ==
=== Independence from Spain (1821) ===
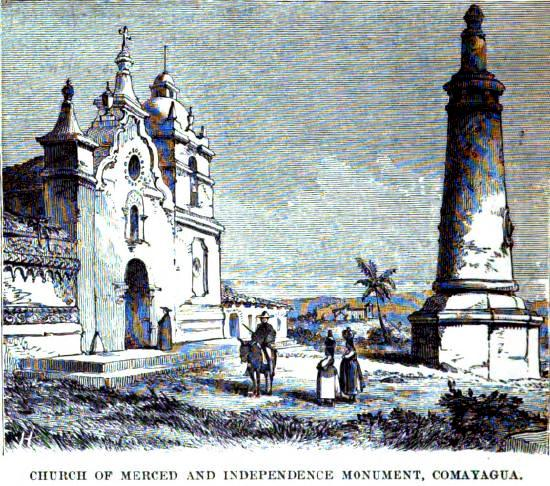
La Merced plaza of Comayagua after the independence from Spain.

In the early 19th century, Napoleon's occupation of Spain led to the outbreak of revolts all across Spanish America. In New Spain, all of the fighting by those seeking independence was done in the center of that area from 1810 to 1821, what today is central Mexico. Once the Viceroy was defeated in Mexico City, in 1821, news of independence was sent to all territories of New Spain including the Intendancies of the former Captaincy of Guatemala. Accepting this as a fact, Honduras joined the other Central American Intendancies in a joint declaration of independence from Spain. The public proclamation was done through the Act of Independence in 1821.

After the declaration of independence it was the intention of the New Spain parliament to establish a commonwealth whereby King of Spain Ferdinand VII would also be Emperor of New Spain, and in which both countries were to be governed by separate laws and with their own legislative offices. Should the king refuse the position, the law provided for a member of the House of Bourbon to accede to the New Spain throne. Ferdinand VII did not recognize the declaration of independence and said that Spain would not allow any other European prince to take the throne of New Spain.

By request of Parliament, the president of the regency Agustín de Iturbide was proclaimed emperor of New Spain but the Parliament also decided to rename New Spain to Mexico. The First Mexican Empire is the official name given to this monarchical regime from 1821 to 1823. The territory of the Mexican Empire included the continental intendencies and provinces of New Spain proper (including those of the former Captaincy General of Guatemala) (See: Central America under Mexican rule).

=== Federal independence period (1821–1838) ===
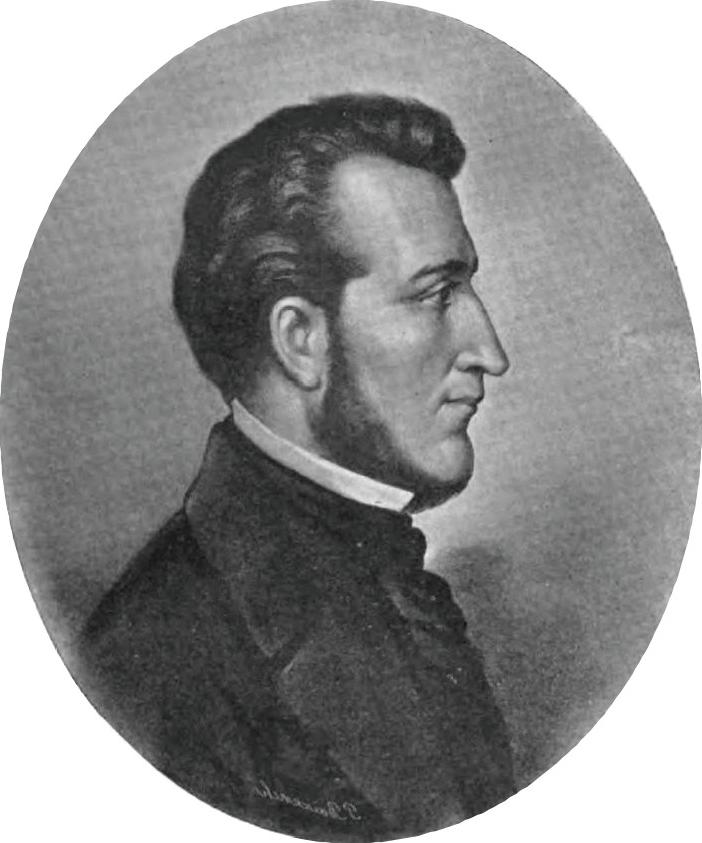
Central American president General Francisco Morazán Quezada.

In 1823, a revolution in Mexico ousted Emperor Agustín de Iturbide, and a new Mexican congress voted to allow the Central American Intendencies to decide their own fate. That year, the United Provinces of Central America was formed of the five Central American Intendencies (Guatemala, Honduras, El Salvador, Nicaragua, and Costa Rica) under General Manuel José Arce. The intendencies took the new name of "states".

Among the most important figures of the federal era include the first democratically elected president in Honduras, Dionisio de Herrera, a lawyer, whose government, begun in 1824 established the first constitution, after him became the presidential period of Gen. Francisco Morazán, Federal President 1830–1834 and 1835–1839, whose figure embodies the ideal American Unionist, and José Cecilio del Valle, editor of the Declaration of Independence signed in Guatemala on 15 September 1821 and Foreign Minister of foreign policies in Mexico in 1823.

Flag of the Central American Federation that lasted until 1839.

Soon, social and economic differences between Honduras social classes and its regional neighbors exacerbated harsh partisan strife among Central American leaders and brought the collapse of the Federation from 1838 to 1839. General Morazán led many successful efforts to maintain the federation during the known First Central American Civil War, against the conservatives, that saw Morazan policies like making the federation a secular state as a threat to their interests. However, despite General Morazan's victories, his army began to wear out by the efforts of war, until the situation became almost untenable until he was captured and shot in Costa Rica, but not before being buried with honors.

His legacy was so important in Honduras and Central America that the department of Francisco Morazan was named after him, and several statues were erected at the end of the 19th century. Restoring Central American unity remained the officially stated chief aim of Honduran foreign policy until after World War I. Honduras broke away from the Central American Federation in October 1838 and became independent and sovereign state.

=== Democratic period (1838–1899) ===
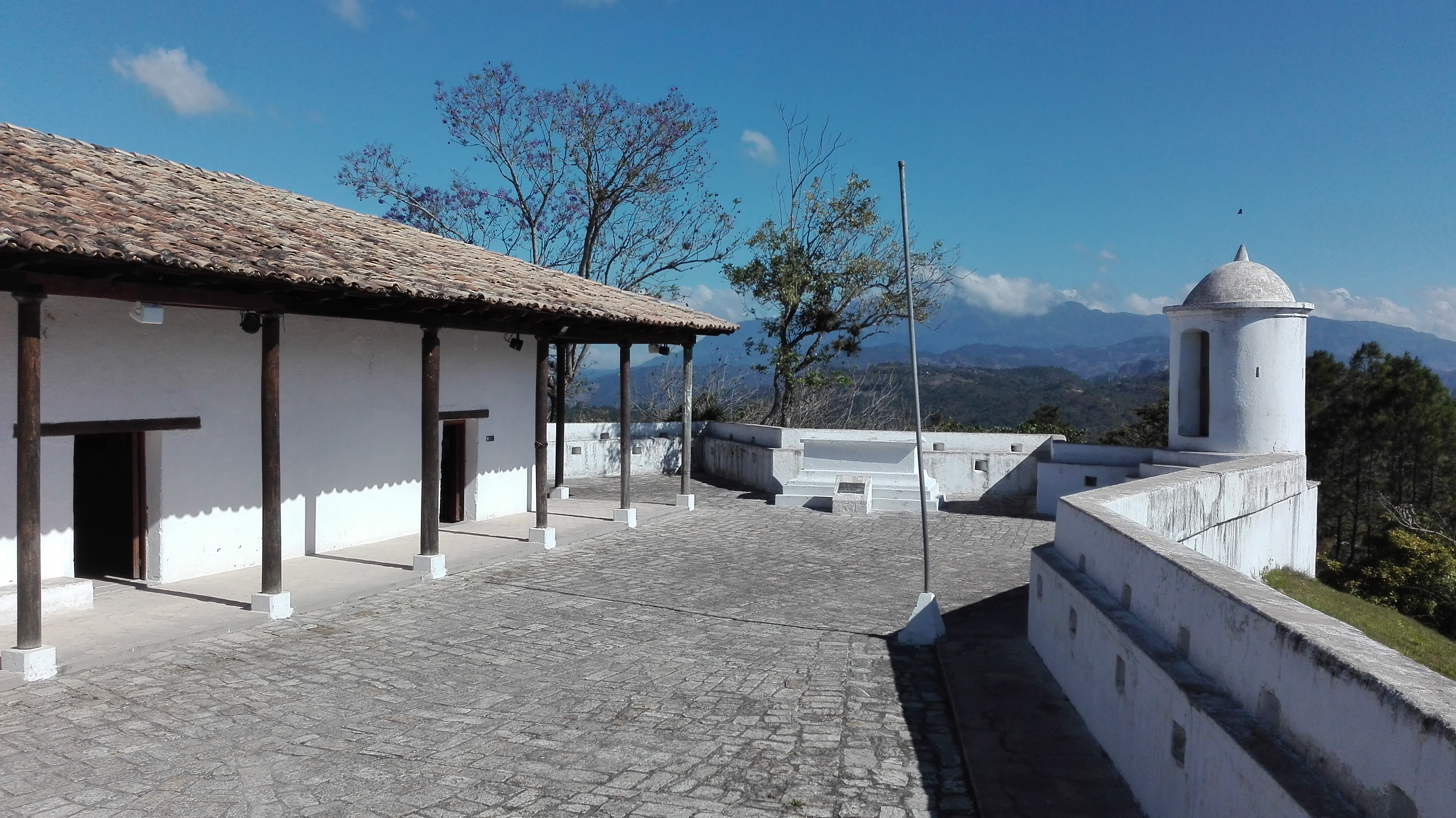
San Cristóbal fortress, in the city of Gracias, built during the 19th century.

During the 1840s and 1850s, Honduras remained actively committed to the idea of Central American unity. The country participated in several initiatives seeking to restore political cooperation among the former members of the Federal Republic of Central America, including the Confederation of Central America (1842–1845), the Covenant of Guatemala (1842), the Diet of Sonsonate (1846), the Diet of Nacaome (1847), and the National Representation of Central America (1849–1852).

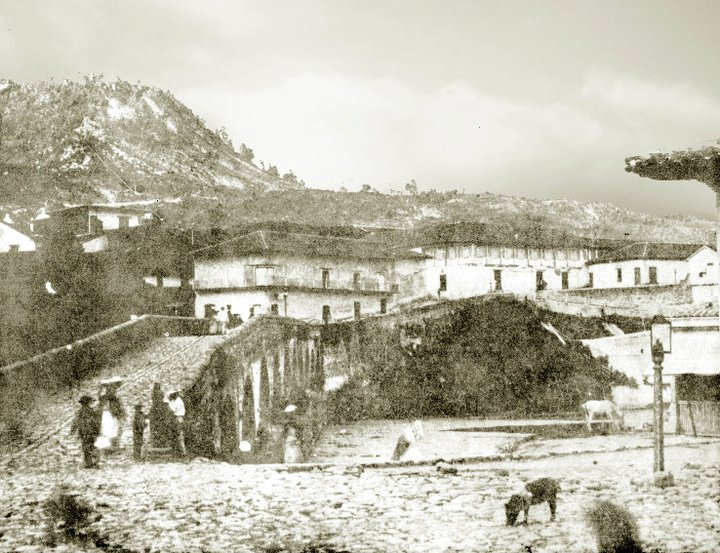
The daguerreotype of Tegucigalpa viewed from Comayagüela, taken in 1853 by the Austrian diplomat Karl Ritter Von Scherzer, is considered the oldest photograph still preserved in Honduras.

Although these efforts did not ultimately lead to a lasting political union, they reflected the persistence of the Central American ideal among Honduran leaders and their regional counterparts. Political rivalries, differences between liberal and conservative governments, and the competing interests of the individual states made a new federation difficult to establish. Honduras eventually adopted the name Republic of Honduras, but the idea of Central American unity remained an important part of its political tradition. Throughout the nineteenth century and into the early twentieth century, Honduran governments continued to support various initiatives aimed at strengthening regional cooperation and, at times, restoring political unity.

The country's early history was also marked by considerable political instability, including numerous uprisings, civil conflicts, and changes of government. These conflicts reflected the broader political struggles that affected Central America during the nineteenth century. In the nineteenth century, Honduras also pursued ambitious infrastructure projects intended to connect the country's Caribbean and Pacific coasts. Among the most important was the construction of an interoceanic railway. Plans for such a railway emerged in the 1850s, and subsequent governments sought foreign investment and assistance to make the project a reality.

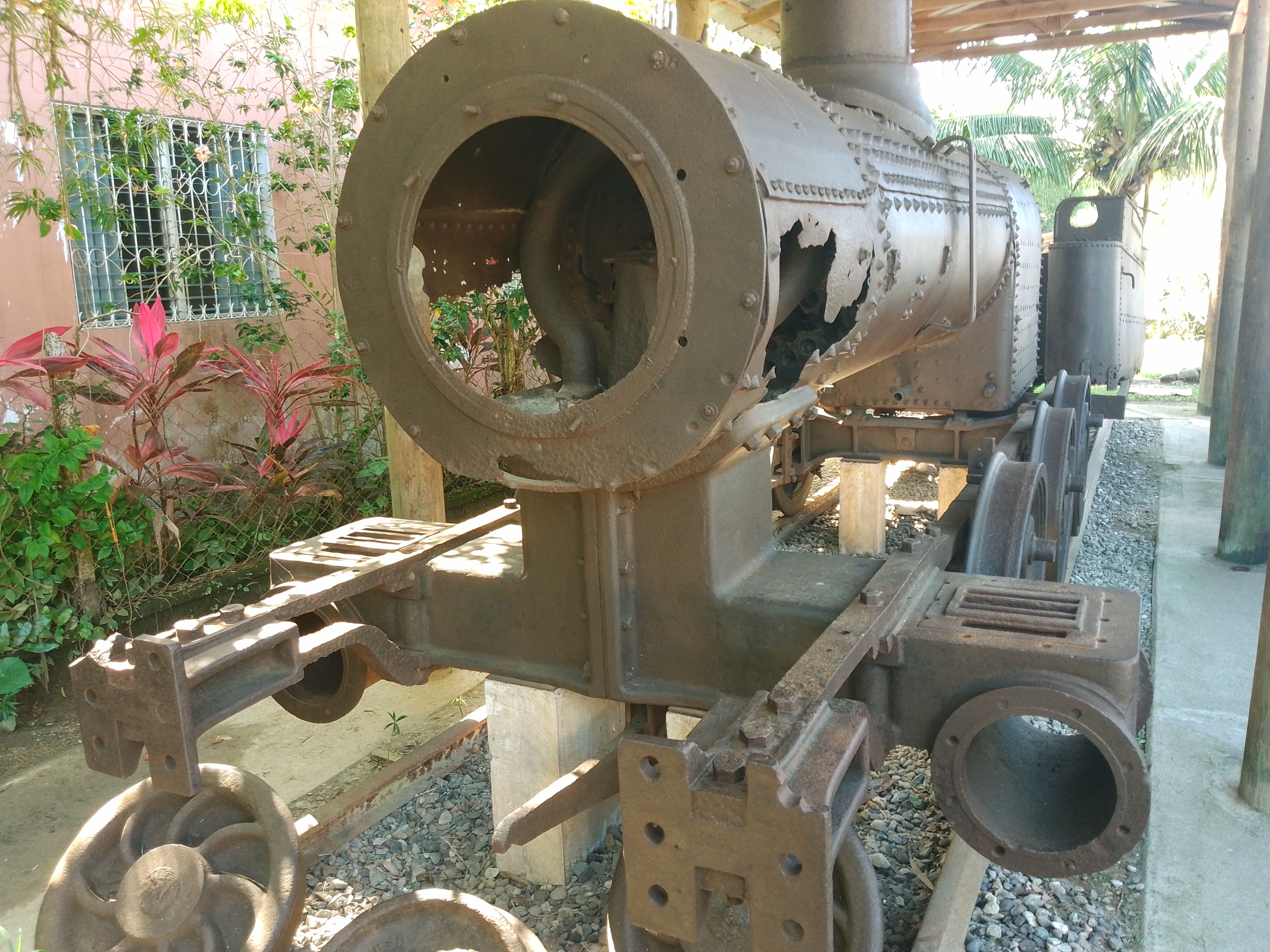
Oldest train still preserved in Honduras.

However the construction of a railway did not begin until some years later, when Honduras's first two locomotives arrived in 1870; they operated along approximately 10 kilometers of track, including a stop in San Pedro Sula. In 1872, Dr. Marco Aurelio Soto assumed the presidency and implemented a series of measures to open the country to the world, addressing the fact that Honduras had been significantly isolated. He opened the nation to international trade and allowed for the immigration of other groups. This liberal reform brought about socioeconomic changes by integrating the country into a changing world and introducing new technologies.

Railway construction advanced gradually, particularly in the north, where lines eventually connected Puerto Cortés with San Pedro Sula and helped stimulate trade and economic development in the Sula Valley. Although the original interoceanic vision was never fully completed, the railway contributed to the emergence of San Pedro Sula as one of Honduras's most important commercial and industrial centers. Comayagua remained the capital of Honduras until 1880, when President Marco Aurelio Soto transferred the capital to Tegucigalpa. The move reflected the growing political and economic importance of Tegucigalpa and marked another important stage in the country's nineteenth-century development., including some changes of government.

== 20th century ==
=== Internationalization of the north (1899–1932) ===
Political stability and instability both aided and distracted the economic revolution which transformed Honduras through the development of a plantation economy on the north coast. As American corporations consolidated increasingly large landholdings in Honduras, they lobbied the US government to protect their investments. Conflicts over land ownership, peasant rights, and a US-aligned comprador class of elites led to armed conflicts and multiple invasions by US armed forces. In the first decades of the century, US military incursions took place in 1903, 1907, 1911, 1912, 1919, 1924, and 1925. Because the country was effectively controlled by American fruit corporations, it was the original inspiration for the term "banana republic".

==== Rise of US influence (1899–1919) ====
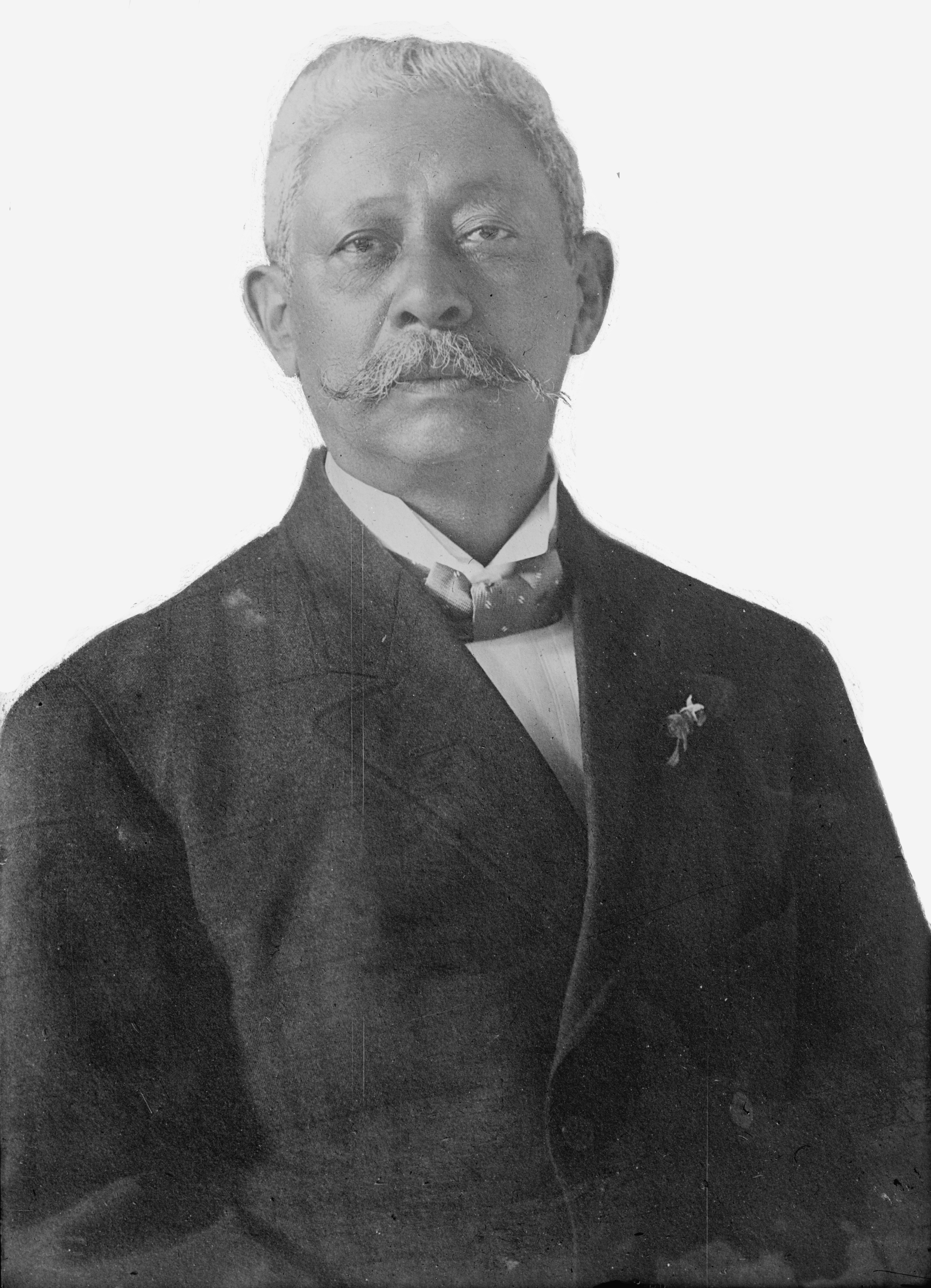
President Manuel Bonilla.

In 1899, the banana industry in Honduras was growing rapidly. A peaceful transfer of power from Policarpo Bonilla to General Terencio Sierra marked the first time in decades that a constitutional transition had taken place. By 1902, railroads had been built along the country's Caribbean coast to accommodate the growing banana industry. However, Sierra made efforts to stay in office and refused to step down when a new president was elected in 1902, and was overthrown by Manuel Bonilla in 1903.

After toppling Sierra, Manuel Bonilla, a conservative, imprisoned ex-president Policarpo Bonilla, a liberal rival, for two years and made other attempts to suppress liberals throughout the country, as they were the only other organized political party. The conservatives were divided into a host of personalist factions and lacked coherent leadership, but Bonilla reorganized the conservatives into a "national party." The present-day National Party of Honduras (Partido Nacional de Honduras—PNH) traces its origins to his administration.

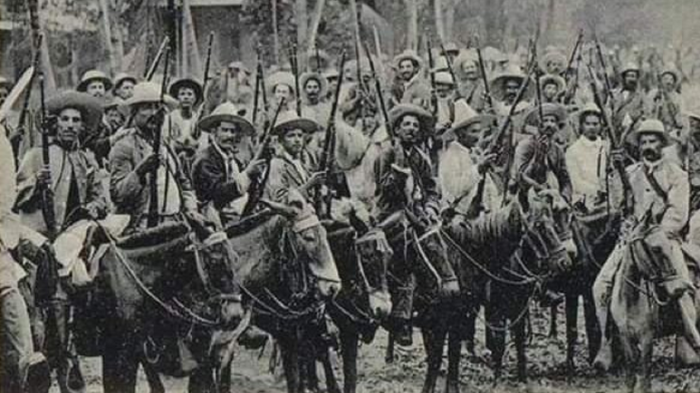
Honduran armed conflict of 1907.

Bonilla proved to be an even better friend to the banana companies than Sierra. Under Bonilla's rule, companies gained exemptions from taxes and permission to construct wharves and roads, as well as permission to improve interior waterways and to obtain charters for new railroad construction. He also successfully established the border with Nicaragua and resisted an invasion from Guatemala in 1906. After fending off Guatemalan military forces, Bonilla sought peace and signed a friendship pact with both Guatemala and El Salvador.

Nicaragua's president José Santos Zelaya saw this friendship pact as an alliance to counter Nicaragua and began to undermine Bonilla. Zelaya supported liberal Honduran exiles in Nicaragua in their efforts to topple Bonilla, who had established himself as a dictator. Supported by elements of the Nicaraguan army, the exiles invaded Honduras in February 1907. With the assistance of Salvadoran troops, Manuel Bonilla tried to resist, but in March his forces were decisively beaten in a battle notable for the introduction of machine guns into Central America. After toppling Bonilla, the exiles established a provisional junta, but this junta did not last.

American elites noticed: it was in their interests to contain Zelaya, protect the region of the new Panama Canal, and defend the increasingly important banana trade. This Nicaragua-assisted invasion by Honduran exiles strongly displeased the United States government, which concluded that Zelaya wanted to dominate the entire Central American region, sent marines to Puerto Cortes to protect the banana trade. US naval units were also sent to Honduras and were able to successfully defend Bonilla's last defense position at Amapala in the Gulf of Fonseca. Through a peace settlement arranged by the US chargé d'affaires in Tegucigalpa, Bonilla stepped down and the war with Nicaragua came to an end.

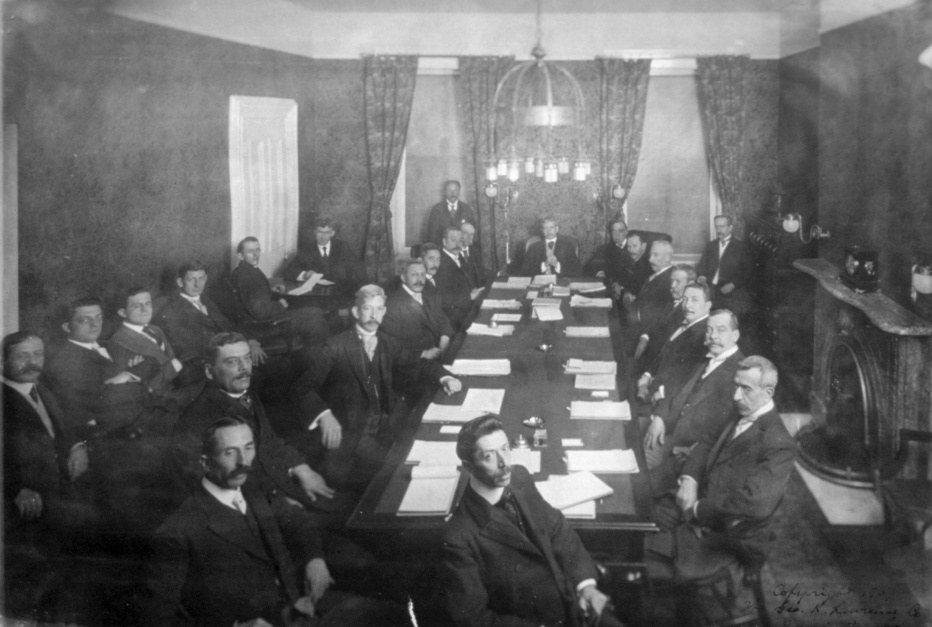
The Central American peace conference in 1907.

The settlement also provided for a compromise régime headed by General Miguel R. Davila in Tegucigalpa. Zelaya however was not pleased by the settlement, as he strongly distrusted Davila. Zelaya made a secret arrangement with El Salvador to oust Davila from office. The plan failed to reach fruition, but alarmed American stakeholders in Honduras. Mexico and the U.S. called the five Central American countries into diplomatic talks at the Central American Peace Conference to increase stability in the area. At the conference, the five countries signed the General Treaty of Peace and Amity of 1907, which established the Central American Court of Justice to resolve future disputes among the five nations. Honduras also agreed to become permanently neutral in any future conflicts among the other nations.

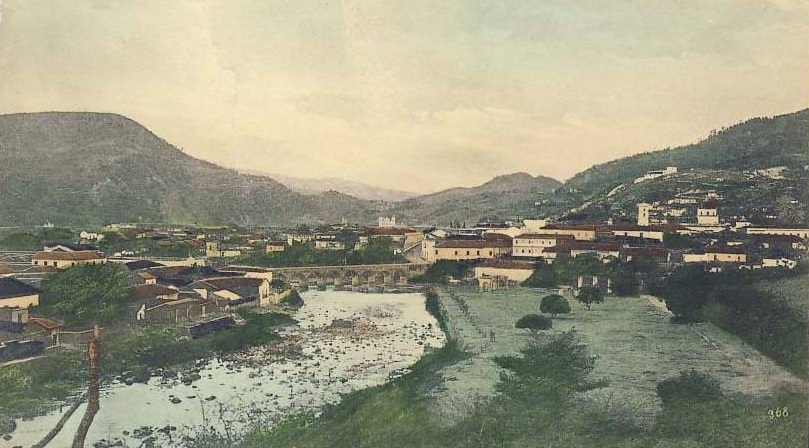
Tegucigalpa in 1910.

In 1908, opponents of Davila made an unsuccessful attempt to overthrow him. Despite the failure of this coup, American elites became concerned over Honduran instability. The Taft Administration saw the huge Honduran debt, over $120 million, as a contributing factor to the instability and began efforts to refinance the largely British debt with provisions for a United States customs receivership or some similar arrangement. Negotiations were arranged between Honduran representatives and New York bankers, headed by J.P. Morgan. By the end of 1909, an agreement had been reached providing for a reduction in the debt and the issuance of new 5% bonds: The bankers would control the Honduran railroad, and the United States government would guarantee continued Honduran independence and would take control of custom revenue.

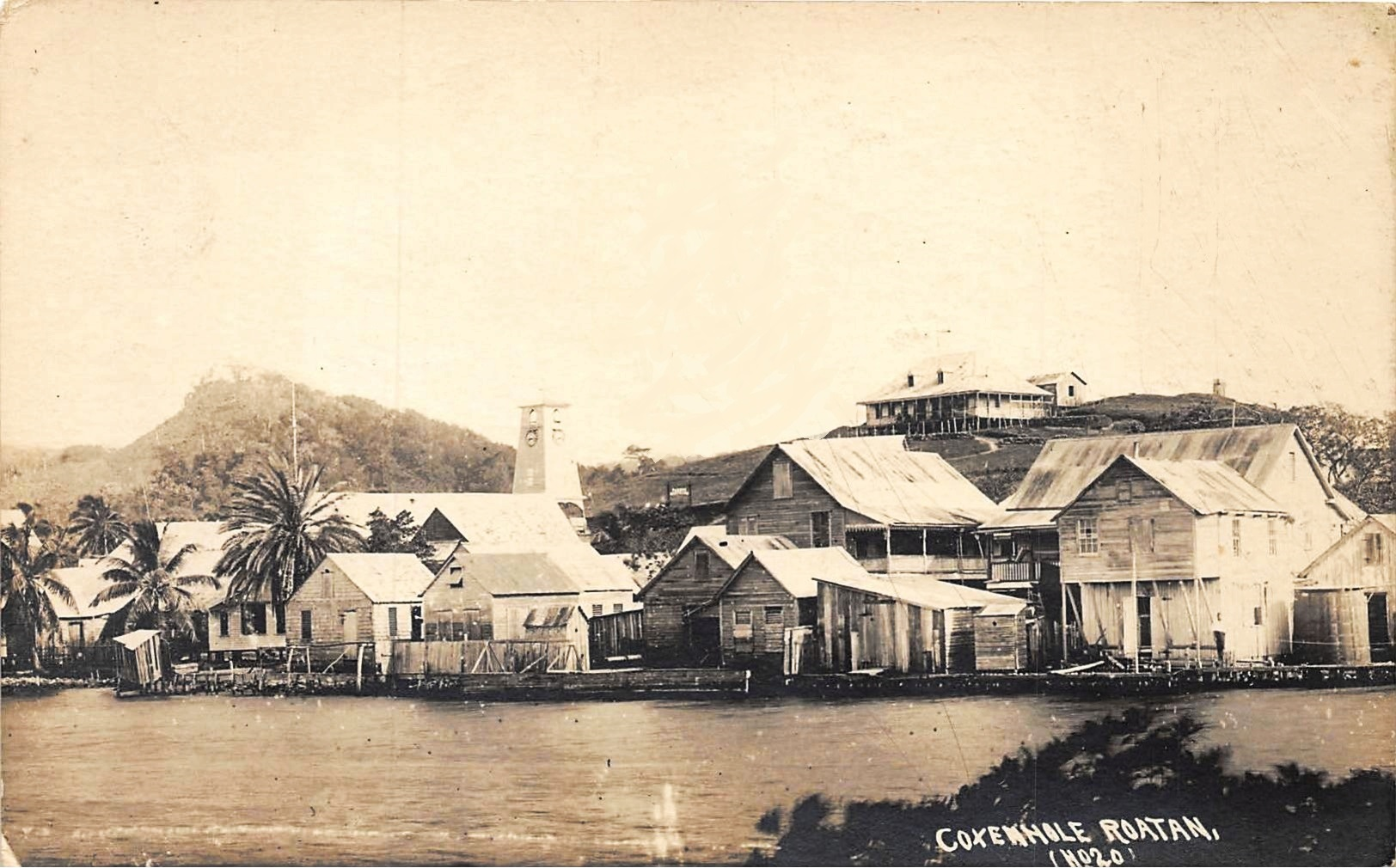
Coxen Hole, Roatán in 1910.

The terms proposed by the bankers met with considerable opposition in Honduras, further weakening the Dávila government. A treaty incorporating the key provisions of this agreement with J.P. Morgan was finally signed in January 1911 and submitted to the Honduran legislature by Dávila. However, that body, in a rare display of independence, rejected it by a vote of thirty-three to five.

An uprising in 1911 against Dávila interrupted efforts to deal with the debt problem. The United States Marines landed, which forced both sides to meet on a US warship. The revolutionaries, headed by former president Manuel Bonilla, and the government agreed to a cease-fire and the installation of a provisional president who would be selected by the United States mediator, Thomas Cleland Dawson. Dawson selected Francisco Bertrand, who promised to hold early, free elections, and Dávila resigned. The 1912 elections were won by Manuel Bonilla, but he died after just over a year in office. Bertrand, who had been his vice president, returned to the presidency and in 1916 won election for a term that lasted until 1920. Between 1911 and 1920, Honduras saw relative stability.

Railroads expanded throughout Honduras and the banana trade grew rapidly. This stability however would prove to be difficult to maintain in the years following 1920. Revolutionary intrigues also continued throughout the period, accompanied by constant rumors that one faction or another was being supported by one of the banana companies.

The development of the banana industry contributed to the beginnings of organized labor movements in Honduras and to the first major strikes in the nation's history. The first of these occurred in 1917 against the Cuyamel Fruit Company. The strike was suppressed by the Honduran military, but the following year additional labor disturbances occurred at the Standard Fruit Company's holding in La Ceiba. In 1920, a general strike hit the Caribbean coast. In response, a United States warship was sent to the area, and the Honduran government began arresting leaders. When Standard Fruit offered a new wage—equivalent to US$1.75 per day—the strike ultimately collapsed. Labor troubles in the banana trade however were far from over.

==== Fruit companies' activity ====
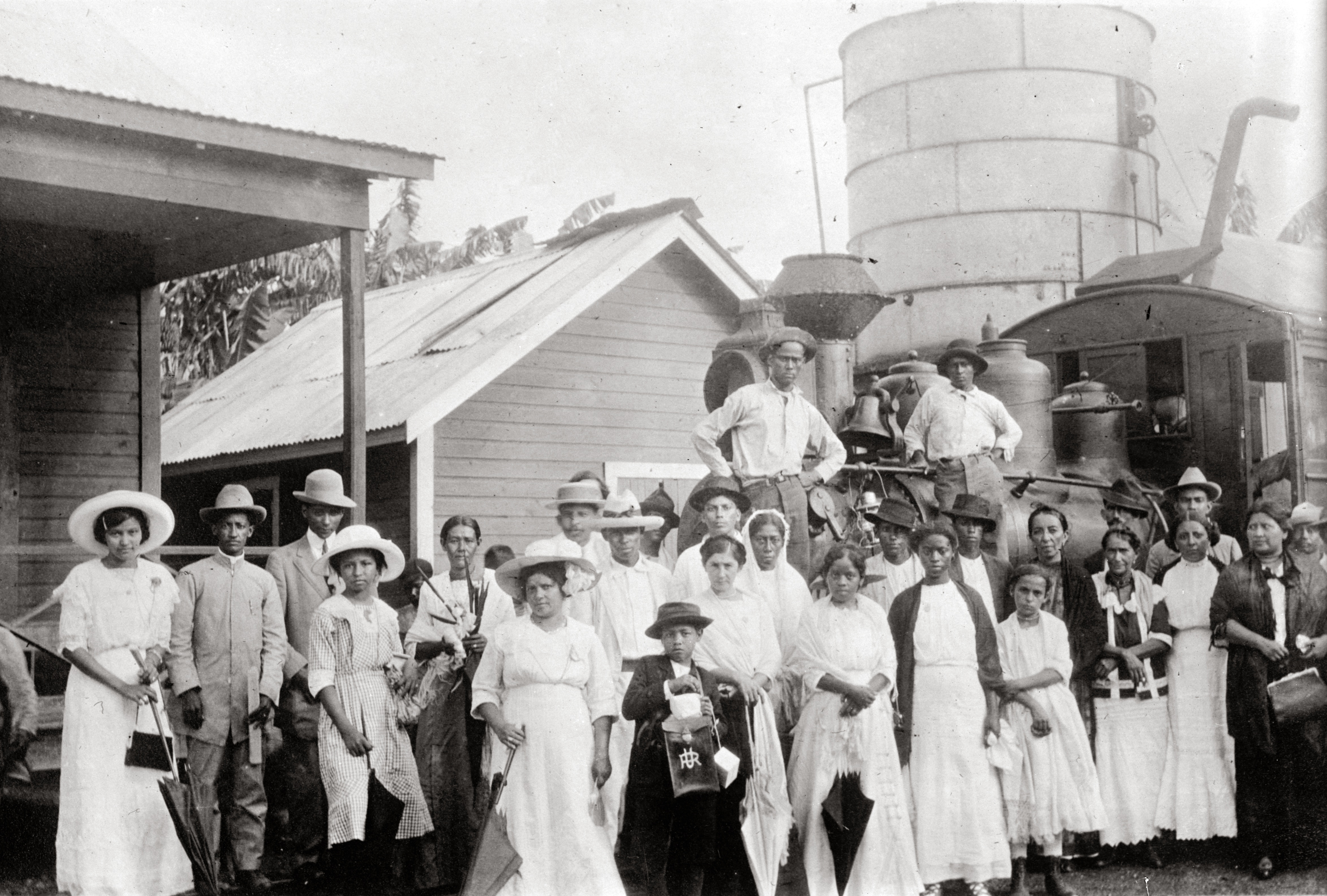
Train station in La Ceiba during the 1920s. The locomotives were one of the main means of transportation in Honduras during the 20th century.

The Liberal government opted to expand production in mining and agriculture, and in 1876 began granting substantial grants of land and tax exemptions to foreign concerns as well as to local businesses. Mining was particularly important, and the new policies coincided with the growth of banana exports, which began in the Bay Islands in the 1870s and was pursued on the mainland by small and middling farmers in the 1880s. Liberal concessions allowed U.S.-based concerns to enter the Honduran market, first as shipping companies, then as railroad and banana producing enterprises. The U.S. companies created very large plantations worked by labor that flooded into the region from the densely settled Pacific coast, other Central American countries, and thanks to the company's policies favoring English speaking people, from the English-speaking Caribbean. The result was an enclave economy centered on the settlements and activities of the three major companies, Cuyamel Fruit Company, Standard Fruit and particularly United Fruit after it absorbed Cuyamel in 1930.

In 1899, Vaccaro Brothers and Company (later known as Standard Fruit), a New Orleans–based fruit corporation, came to Honduras in 1899 to buy coconuts, oranges and bananas on Roatán. After successfully selling the fruit in New Orleans, the company moved to the mainland of Honduras. In 1901, Vaccaro Brothers established offices in La Ceiba and Salado and eventually controlled the banana industry between Boca Cerrada and Balfate (an area of about 80 kilometers of coastline). In 1900, American businessman Samuel Zemurray and United Fruit came to Honduras to purchase banana plantations. In 1905, Zemurray started buying his own plantations and in 1910, after purchasing 5,000 acres (20 km^{2}) of plantation land in Honduras, formed his own company, the Cuyamel Fruit Company. The two companies' wealth and powerful connections allowed them to gain extraordinary influence in the Honduran government.

Rivalries between the companies, however, escalated in 1910, when the United Fruit came to Honduras to set up operations; the company had already been a local producer of bananas in Honduras. By 1912, United Fruit had two concessions it had purchased with government approval. One was to build a railroad from Tela to Progreso in the Sula Valley, and the other was to build a railroad from Trujillo to the city of Juticalpa in Olancho. In 1913, United Fruit established the Tela Railroad Company and shortly thereafter a similar subsidiary, the Trujillo Railroad Company; these two railroads managed the concessions which the Honduran government granted them. Through these two railroad companies, United Fruit dominated the banana trade in Honduras.

Agriculture and trade of Honduras, a manual published in the early XX century.

An 1899 census showed that northern Honduras had been exporting bananas for several years and that over 1,000 people in the region between Puerto Cortes and La Ceiba (and inland as far as San Pedro Sula) were tending bananas, most of them small holders. The fruit companies received very large concessions of land, often forcing small holders who had been growing and exporting bananas on their land out of business. In addition, they brought in many workers from Jamaica and Belize, both to work on the plantations, but also as lower managers and skilled workers. The companies often favored the West Indian workers because they spoke English and were sometimes better educated than their Honduran counterparts. This perception of foreign occupation, coupled with a growing race-prejudice against the African-descended West Indians, led to considerable tension, as the arrival of the West Indians drove demographic change in the region.

The connection between the wealth of the banana trade and the influence of outsiders, particularly North Americans, led O. Henry, the American writer who took temporary refuge in Honduras in 1896–97, to coin the term "banana republic" to describe a fictional nation he modeled on Honduras. By 1912, three companies dominated the banana trade in Honduras: Samuel Zemurray's Cuyamel Fruit Company, Vaccaro Brothers and Company and the United Fruit Company; all of which tended to be vertically integrated, owning their own lands and railroad companies and ship lines such as United's "Great White Fleet". Through land subsidies granted to the railroads, they soon came to control vast tracts of the best land along the Caribbean coast. Coastal cities such as La Ceiba, Tela, and Trujillo and towns further inland such as El Progreso and La Lima became virtual company towns.

For the next twenty years, the U.S. government was involved in quelling Central American disputes, insurrections, and revolutions, whether supported by neighboring governments or by United States companies. As part of the so-called Banana Wars all around the Caribbean, Honduras saw the insertion of American troops in 1903, 1907, 1911, 1912, 1919, 1924 and 1925. For instance, in 1917 the Cuyamel Fruit Company extended its rail lines into disputed Guatemalan territory.

==== Renewed instability (1919–1924) ====
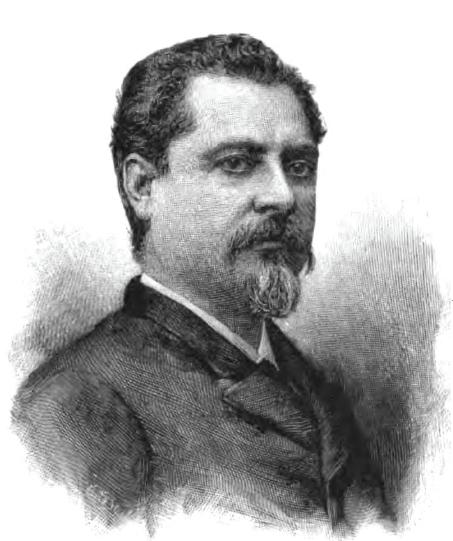
General Luis Bogran.

In 1919, it became obvious that Francisco Bertrand would refuse to allow an open election to choose his successor. This course of action was opposed by the United States and had little popular support in Honduras. The local military commander and governor of Tegucigalpa, General Rafael López Gutiérrez, took the lead in organizing PLH opposition to Bertrand. López Gutiérrez also solicited support from the liberal government of Guatemala and even from the conservative regime in Nicaragua. Bertrand, in turn, sought support from El Salvador.

Determined to avoid an international conflict, the United States government, after some hesitation, offered to meditate the dispute, hinting to the Honduran president that if he refused the offer, open intervention might follow. The United States landed US Marines on 11 September 1919. Bertrand promptly resigned and left the country. The United States ambassador helped install an interim government headed by Francisco Bográn, who promised to hold free elections. General López Gutiérrez, who now controlled the military, made it clear that he was determined to be the next president. After considerable negotiation and some confusion, a formula was worked out under which elections were held. López Gutiérrez won easily in a manipulated election, and in October 1920 he assumed the presidency.

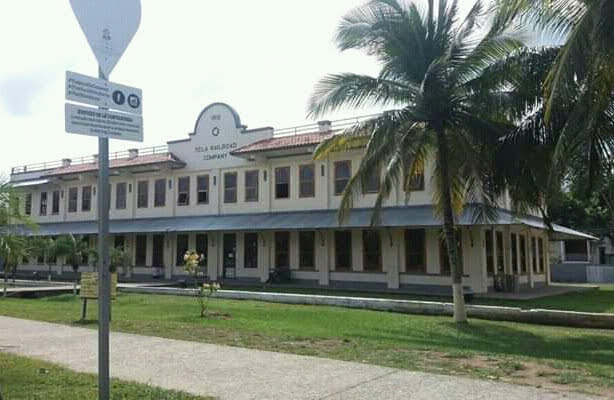
Tela's railroad company building, built in 1919.

During Bográn's brief time in office, he had agreed to a United States proposal to invite a United States financial adviser to Honduras. Arthur N. Young of the Department of State was selected for this task and began work in Honduras in August 1920, continuing to August 1921. While there, Young compiled extensive data and made numerous recommendations, even persuading the Hondurans to hire a New York police lieutenant to reorganize their police forces. Young's investigations clearly demonstrated the desperate need for major financial reforms in Honduras, whose always precarious budgetary situation was considerably worsened by the renewal of revolutionary activities.

In 1919, for example, the military had spent more than double the amount budgeted for them, accounting for over 57 percent of all federal expenditures. Young's recommendations for reducing the military budget, however, found little favor with the new López Gutiérrez administration, and the government's financial condition remained a major problem. The purpose was to modernize the Honduran Army, which still possessed technology from the late-19th century. If anything, continued uprisings against the government and the threat of a renewed Central America conflict made the situation even worse. From 1919 to 1924, the Honduran government expended US$7.2 million beyond the amount covered by the regular budgets for military operations.

==== Coups ====
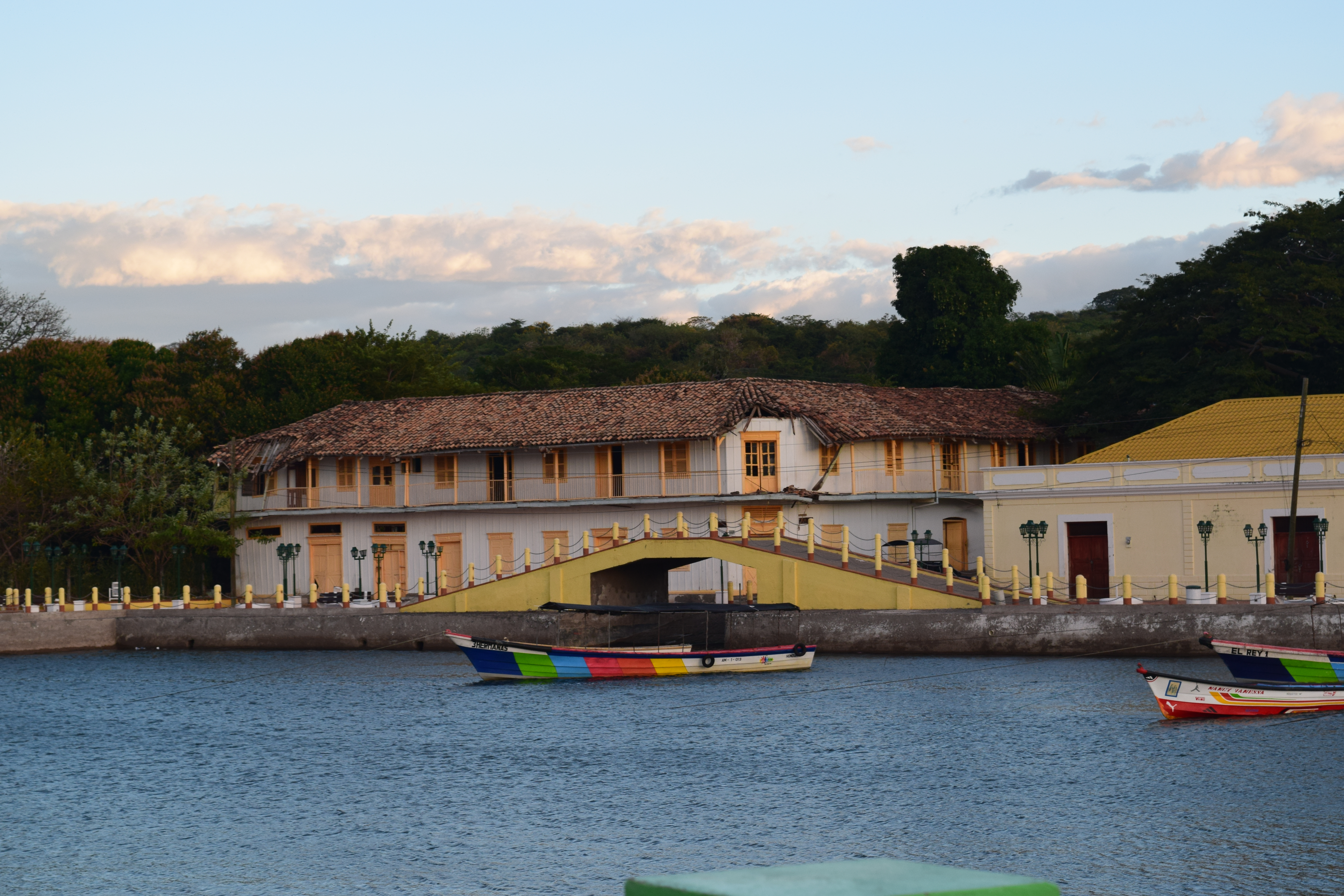
Port of Amapala.

From 1920 through 1923, seventeen uprisings or attempted coups in Honduras contributed to growing United States concern over political instability in Central America. In August 1922, the presidents of Honduras, Nicaragua, and El Salvador met on the USS Tacoma in the Gulf of Fonseca. Under the watchful eye of the United States ambassadors to their nations, the presidents pledged to prevent their territories from being used to promote revolutions against their neighbors and issued a call for a general meeting of Central American states in Washington at the end of the year.

The Washington conference concluded in February with the adoption of the General Treaty of Peace and Amity of 1923, which had eleven supplemental conventions. The treaty in many ways followed the provisions of the 1907 treaty. The Central American court was reorganized, reducing the influence of the various governments over its membership. The clause providing for withholding recognition of revolutionary governments was expanded to preclude recognition of any revolutionary leader, his relatives, or anyone who had been in power six months before or after such an uprising unless the individual's claim to power had been ratified by free elections. The governments renewed their pledges to refrain from aiding revolutionary movements against their neighbors and to seek peaceful resolution for all outstanding disputes.

The supplemental conventions covered everything from the promotion of agriculture to armament limitation. One, which remained unratified, provided for free trade among all of the states except Costa Rica. The arms limitation agreement set a ceiling on the size of each nation's military forces (2,500 men in the case of Honduras) and included a United States-sponsored pledge to seek foreign assistance in establishing more professional armed forces.

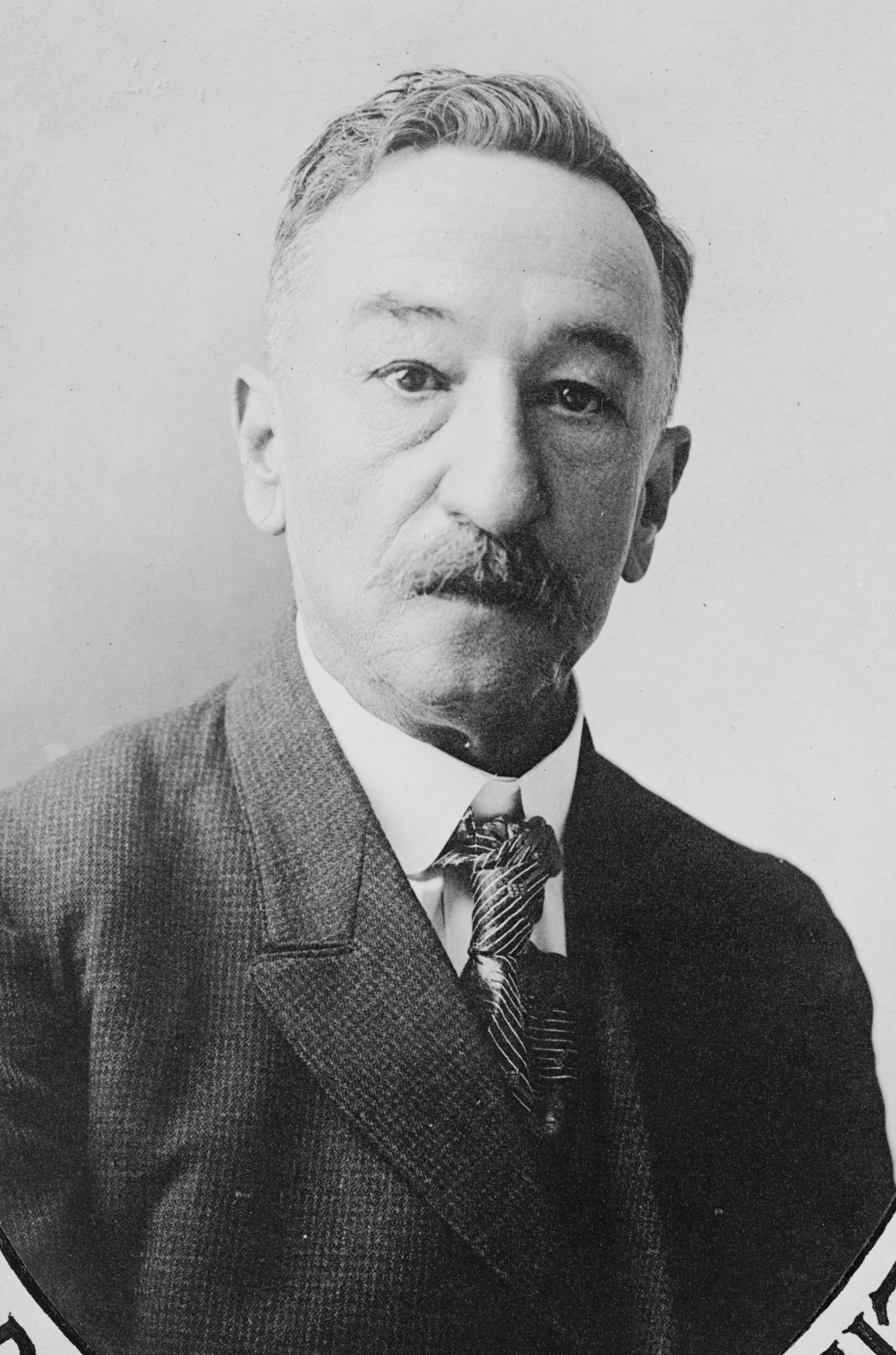
Elected Liberal president, Rafael López Gutiérrez.

The October 1923 Honduran presidential elections and subsequent political and military conflicts provided the first real tests of these new treaty arrangements. Under heavy pressure from Washington, López Gutiérrez allowed an unusually open campaign and election. The long-fragmented conservatives reunited as the National Party of Honduras (Partido Nacional de Honduras—PNH), which ran as its candidate General Tiburcio Carías Andino, the governor of the department of Cortés. The liberal PLH was unable to unite around a single candidate and split into two dissident groups, one supporting former president Policarpo Bonilla, the other advancing the candidacy of Juan Angel Arias. As a result, no candidate secured a majority.

Carías received the greatest number of votes, with Bonilla second and Arias a distant third. Under the terms of the Honduran constitution, this stalemate left the final choice of president up to the legislature, but that body was unable to obtain a quorum and reach a decision. In January 1924, López Gutiérrez announced his intention to remain in office until new elections could be held, but he repeatedly refused to specify a date for the elections. Carías, reportedly with the support of United Fruit, declared himself president, and an armed conflict broke out. In February the United States, warning that recognition would be withheld from anyone coming to power by revolutionary means, suspended relations with the López Gutiérrez government for its failure to hold elections. Conditions rapidly deteriorated in the early months of 1924. On 28 February, a pitched battle took place in La Ceiba between government troops and rebels.

Even the presence of the USS Denver and the landing of a force of United States Marines were unable to prevent widespread looting and arson resulting in over US$2 million in property damage. Fifty people, including a United States citizen, were killed in the fighting. In the weeks that followed, additional vessels from the United States Navy Special Service Squadron were concentrated in Honduran waters, and landing parties put ashore to protect United States interests. One force of marines and sailors was dispatched inland to Tegucigalpa to provide additional protection for the United States legation. Shortly before the arrival of the force, López Gutiérrez died, and what authority remained with the central government was being exercised by his cabinet. General Carías and a variety of other rebel leaders controlled most of the countryside but failed to coordinate their activities effectively enough to seize the capital.

In an effort to end the fighting, the United States government dispatched Sumner Welles to the port of Amapala; he had instructions to try to produce a settlement that would bring to power a government eligible for recognition under the terms of the 1923 treaty. Negotiations, which were once again held on board a United States cruiser, lasted from 23 to 28 April. An agreement was worked out that provided for an interim presidency headed by General Vicente Tosta, who agreed to appoint a cabinet representing all political factions and to convene a Constituent Assembly within ninety days to restore constitutional order. Presidential elections were to be held as soon as possible, and Tosta promised to refrain from running himself. Once in office, the new president showed signs of reneging on some of his pledges, especially those related to a bipartisan cabinet. Under heavy pressure from the United States delegation, however, he ultimately complied with the provisions of the peace agreement.

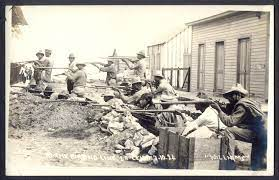
Battle of La Ceiba during the Second Honduran Civil war.

Keeping the 1924 elections on track proved difficult. To put pressure on Tosta to conduct a fair election, the United States continued an embargo on arms to Honduras and barred the government from access to loans—including a requested US$75,000 from the Banco Atlántida. Furthermore, the United States persuaded El Salvador, Guatemala, and Nicaragua to join in declaring that under the 1923 treaty provision, no leader of the recent revolution would be recognized as president for the coming term. These pressures ultimately helped persuade Carías to withdraw his candidacy and also helped ensure the defeat of an uprising led by General Gregorio Ferrera (great-grandfather of American actress America Ferrera) of the PNH. The PNH nominated Miguel Paz Barahona (1925–29), a civilian, as president. The PLH, after some debate, refused to nominate a candidate, and on 28 December Paz Barahona won virtual unanimous election.

==== Restoration of order (1925–1931) ====
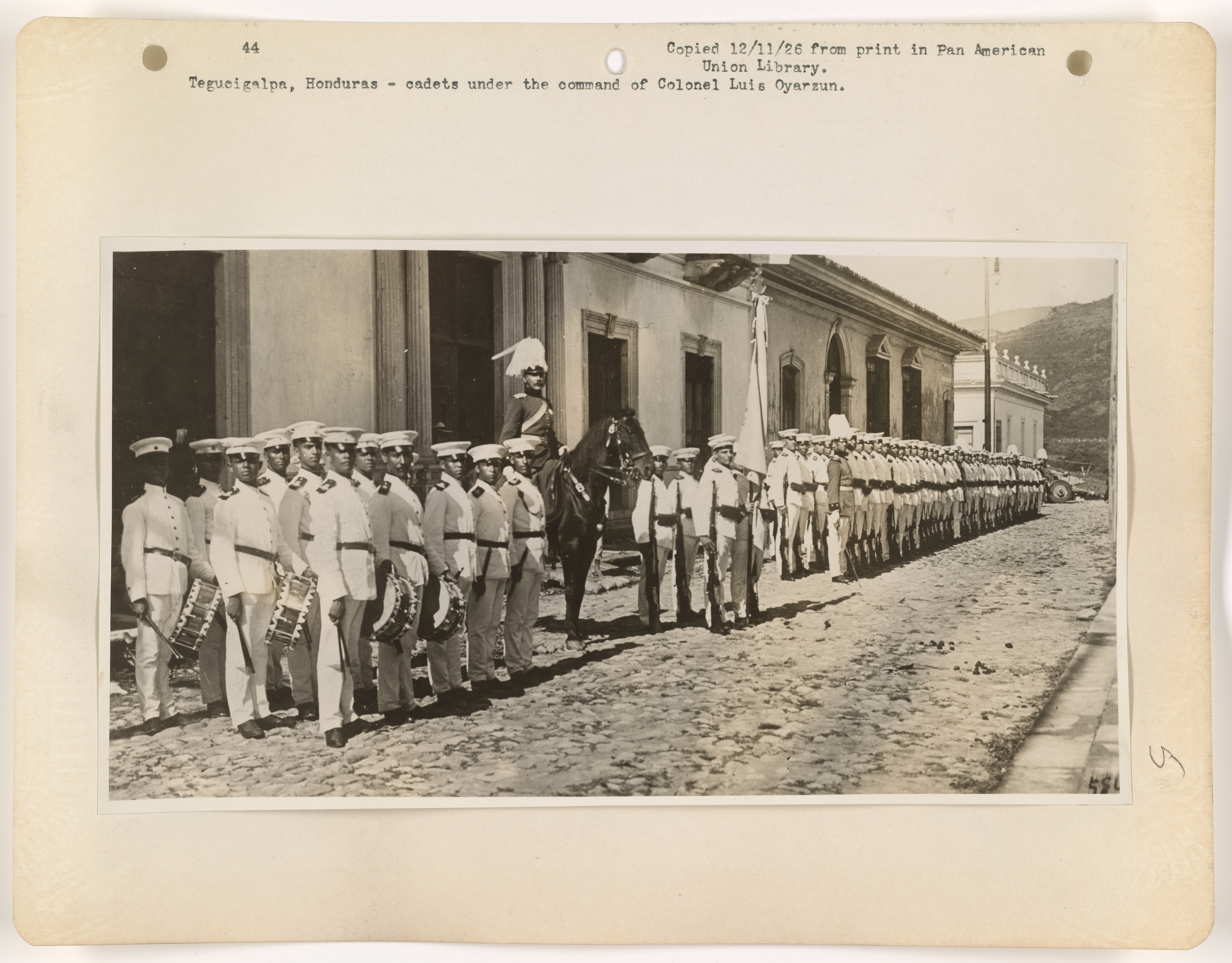
Honduran army in 1926.

Despite another minor uprising led by General Ferrera in 1925, Paz Barahona's administration was, by Honduran standards, rather tranquil. The banana companies continued to expand, the government's budgetary situation improved, and there was even an increase in labor organizing. On the international front, the Honduran government, after years of negotiations, finally concluded an agreement with the British bondholders to liquidate most of the immense national debt. The bonds were to be redeemed at 20 percent of face value over a thirty-year period. Back interest was forgiven, and new interest accrued only over the last fifteen years of this arrangement. Under the terms of this agreement, Honduras, at last, seemed on the road to fiscal solvency.

Fears of disturbances increased again in 1928 as the scheduled presidential elections approached. The ruling PNH nominated General Carías while the PLH, united again following the death of Policarpo Bonilla in 1926, nominated Vicente Mejía Colindres. To the surprise of most observers, both the campaign and the election were conducted with a minimum of violence and intimidation. Mejía Colindres won a decisive victory—obtaining 62,000 votes to 47,000 for Carías. Even more surprising was Carías's public acceptance of defeat and his urging of his supporters to accept the new government.

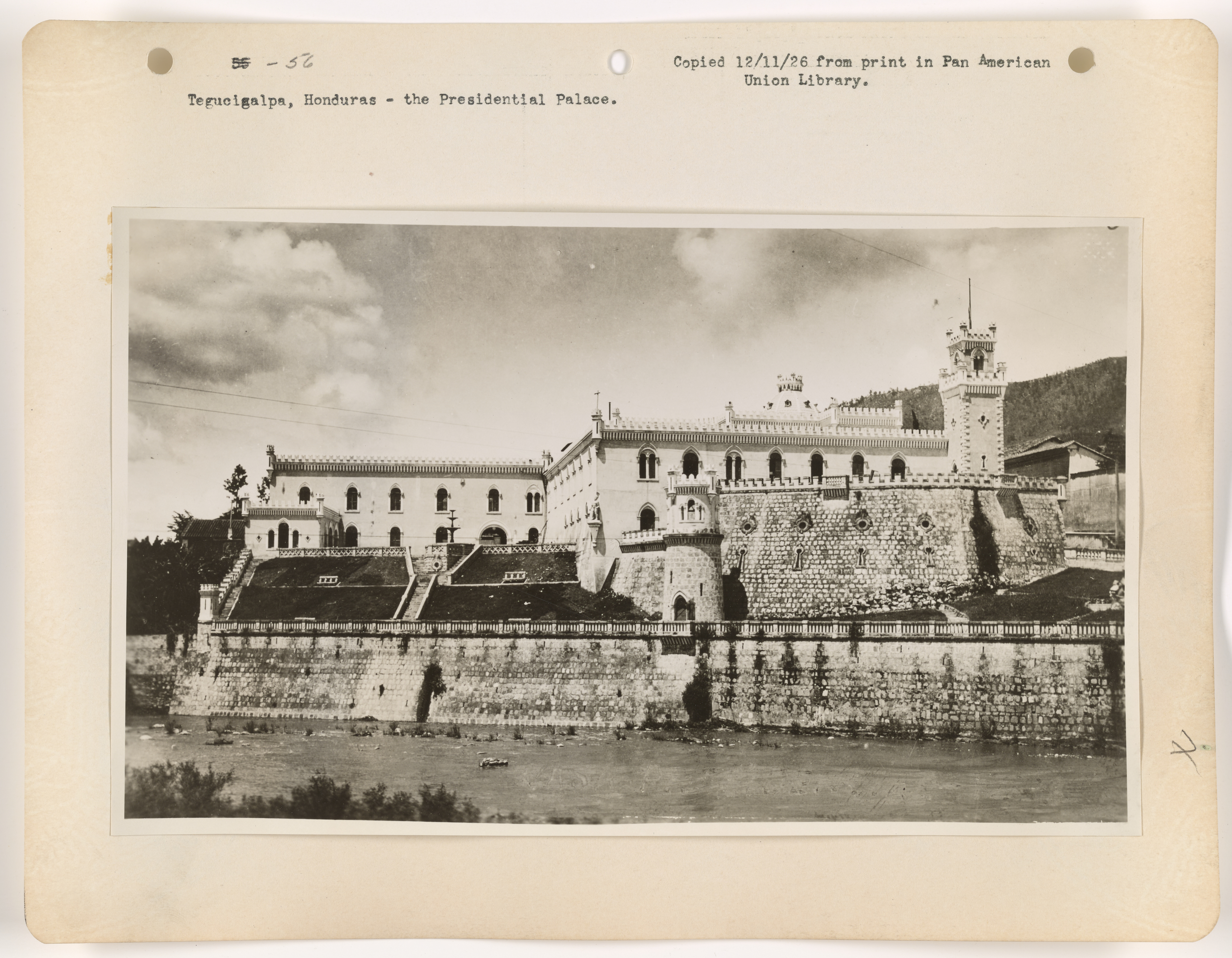
Old presidential palace, finished in 1926.

Mejía Colindres took office in 1929 with high hopes for his administration and his nation. Honduras seemed on the road to political and economic progress. Banana exports, then accounting for 80 percent of all exports, continued to expand. By 1930 Honduras had become the world's leading producer of the fruit, accounting for one-third of the world's supply of bananas. United Fruit had come increasingly to dominate the trade, and in 1929 it bought out the Cuyamel Fruit Company, one of its two principal remaining rivals. B

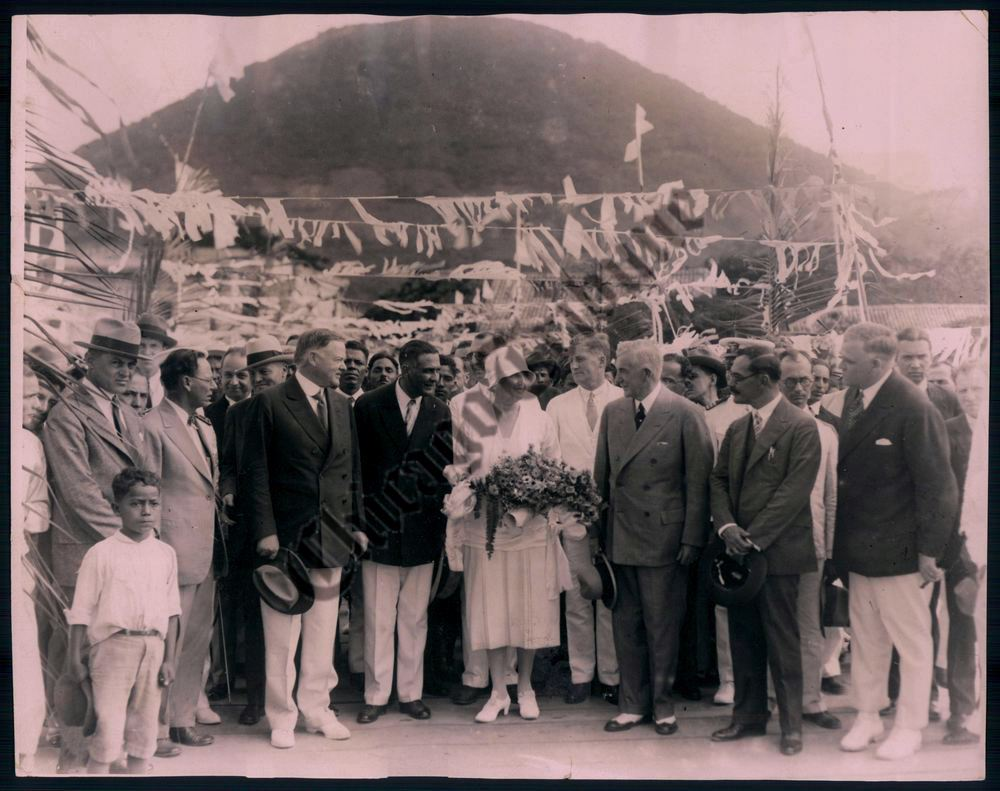
Diplomtic visit of US president Herbert Hoover to the port of Amapala in 1928.

ecause conflicts between these companies had frequently led to support for rival groups in Honduran politics, had produced a border controversy with Guatemala, and may have even contributed to revolutionary disturbances, this merger seemed to promise greater domestic tranquility. The prospect for tranquility was further advanced in 1931 when Ferrera and his insurgents were killed, while leading one last unsuccessful effort to overthrow the government, after government troops discovered their hiding place in Chamelecon.

Many of Mejía Colindres's hopes, however, were dashed with the onset of the Great Depression. Banana exports peaked in 1930, then declined rapidly. Thousands of workers were laid off, and the wages of those remaining on the job were reduced, as were the prices paid to independent banana producers by the giant fruit companies. Strikes and other labor disturbances began to break out in response to these conditions, but most were quickly suppressed with the aid of government troops. As the depression deepened, the government's financial situation deteriorated; in 1931 Mejía Colindres was forced to borrow US$250,000 from the fruit companies to ensure that the army would continue to be paid.

=== Tiburcio Carías Andino (1932–1949) ===
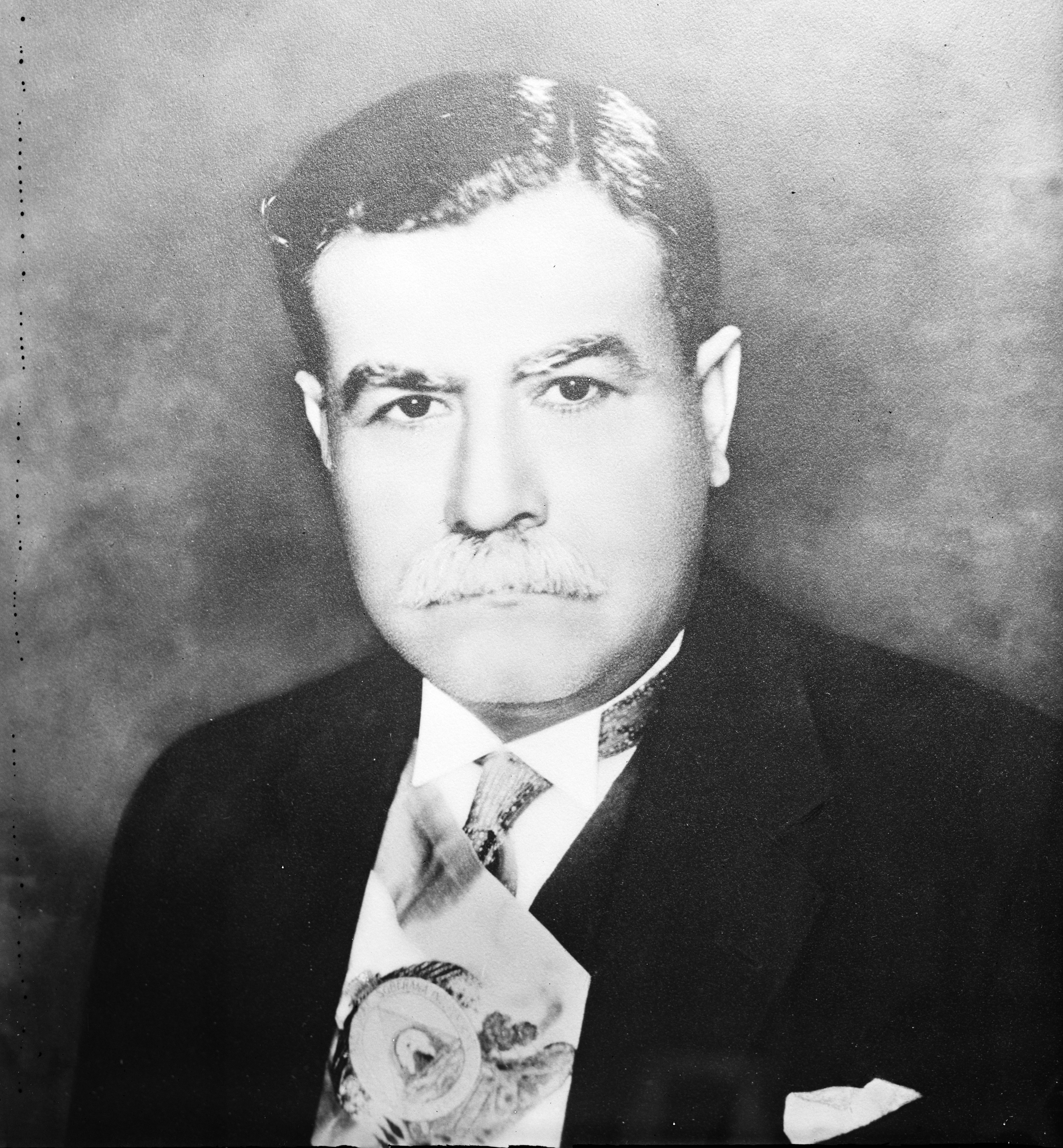
The dictatorship of Carias Andino is remembered as the longest dictatorship that Honduras has ever had.

Despite growing unrest and severe economic strains, the 1932 presidential elections in Honduras were relatively peaceful and fair. The peaceful transition of power was surprising because the onset of the depression had led to the overthrow of governments elsewhere throughout Latin America, in nations with much stronger democratic traditions than those of Honduras. After United Fruit bought out Cuyamel, Sam Zemurray, a strong supporter of the Liberal Party, left the country and the Liberals were short on cash by the 1932 general election. Mejía Colindres, however, resisted pressure from his own party to manipulate the results to favor the PLH candidate, Angel Zúñiga Huete. As a result, the PNH candidate, Carías, won the election by a margin of some 20,000 votes. On 16 November 1932, Carías took office, beginning what was to be the longest period of continuous time in power by any individual in Honduran history.

Shortly before Carías's inauguration, dissident liberals, despite the opposition of Mejía Colindres, had risen in revolt. Carías had taken command of the government forces, obtained arms from El Salvador, and crushed the uprising in short order. Most of Carías's first term in office was devoted to efforts to avoid financial collapse, improve the military, engage in a limited program of road building, and lay the foundations for prolonging his own hold on power.

The economy remained extremely bad throughout the 1930s. In addition to the dramatic drop in banana exports caused by the depression, the fruit industry was further threatened by the outbreak in 1935 of epidemics of Panama disease (a debilitating fungus) and sigatoka (leaf blight) in the banana-producing areas. Within a year, most of the country's production was threatened. Large areas, including most of those around Trujillo, were abandoned, and thousands of Hondurans were thrown out of work. By 1937 a means of controlling the disease had been found, but many of the affected areas remained out of production because a significant share of the market formerly held by Honduras had shifted to other nations.

Carías had made efforts to improve the military even before he became president. Once in office, both his capacity and his motivation to continue and to expand such improvements increased. He gave special attention to the fledgling air force, founding the Military Aviation School in 1934 and arranging for a United States colonel to serve as its commandant.

As months passed, Carías moved slowly but steadily to strengthen his hold on power. He gained the support of the banana companies through opposition to strikes and other labor disturbances. He strengthened his position with domestic and foreign financial circles through conservative economic policies. Even in the height of the depression, he continued to make regular payments on the Honduran debt, adhering strictly to the terms of the arrangement with the British bondholders and also satisfying other creditors. Two small loans were paid off completely in 1935. Political controls were instituted slowly under Carías. The Communist Party of Honduras (Partido Comunista de Honduras—PCH) was outlawed, but the PLH continued to function, and even the leaders of a small uprising in 1935 were later offered free air transportation should they wish to return to Honduras from their exile abroad. At the end of 1935, however, stressing the need for peace and internal order, Carías began to crack down on the opposition press and political activities. Meanwhile, the PNH, at the president's direction, began a propaganda campaign stressing that only keeping Carías in office could give the nation continued peace and order. The constitution, however, prohibited immediate reelection of presidents.

To extend his term of office Carías called a constituent assembly to write a new constitution and select the individual to serve for the first presidential term under that document. Except for the president's desire to perpetuate himself in office, there seemed little reason to alter the nation's basic charter. Earlier constituent assemblies had written thirteen constitutions (only ten of which had entered into force), and the latest had been adopted in 1924. The handpicked Constituent Assembly of 1936 incorporated thirty of the articles of the 1924 document into the 1936 constitution.

The major changes were the elimination of the prohibition on immediate reelection of a president and vice president and lengthening the presidential term from four years to six. Other changes included restoration of the death penalty, reductions in the powers of the legislature, and denial of citizenship to women, and therefore also of the right to vote. Finally, the new constitution included an article specifying that the incumbent president and vice president would remain in office until 1943. But Carías, by then a virtual dictator, wanted even more, so in 1939 the legislature, now completely controlled by the PNH, extended his term in office by another six years (to 1949).

The PLH and other opponents of the government reacted to these changes by attempting to overthrow Carías. Numerous coup attempts in 1936 and 1937, succeeded only in further weakening the PNH's opponents. By the end of the 1930s, the PNH was the only organized functioning political party in the nation. Numerous opposition leaders had been imprisoned, and some had reportedly been chained and put to work in the streets of Tegucigalpa. Others, including the leader of the PLH, Zúñiga Huete, had fled into exile.

During his presidency, Carías cultivated close relations with his fellow Central American dictators, generals Jorge Ubico in Guatemala, Maximiliano Hernández Martínez in El Salvador, and Anastasio Somoza García in Nicaragua. Relations were particularly close with Ubico, who helped Carías reorganize his secret police and also captured and shot the leader of a Honduran uprising who had made the mistake of crossing into Guatemalan territory. Relations with Nicaragua were somewhat more strained as a result of the continuing border dispute, but Carías and Somoza managed to keep this dispute under control throughout the 1930s and 1940s.

The value of these ties became somewhat questionable in 1944 when popular revolts in Guatemala and El Salvador deposed Ubico and Hernández Martínez. For a time, it seemed as if revolutionary contagion might spread to Honduras as well. A plot, involving some military officers as well as opposition civilians, had already been discovered and crushed in late 1943. In May 1944, a group of women began demonstrating outside of the Presidential Palace in Tegucigalpa, demanding the release of political prisoners.

Despite strong government measures, tension continued to grow, and Carías was ultimately forced to release some prisoners. This gesture failed to satisfy the opposition, and antigovernment demonstrations continued to spread. In July several demonstrators were killed by troops in San Pedro Sula. In October a group of exiles invaded Honduras from El Salvador but were unsuccessful in their efforts to topple the government. The military remained loyal, and Carías continued in office.

==== Second World War ====
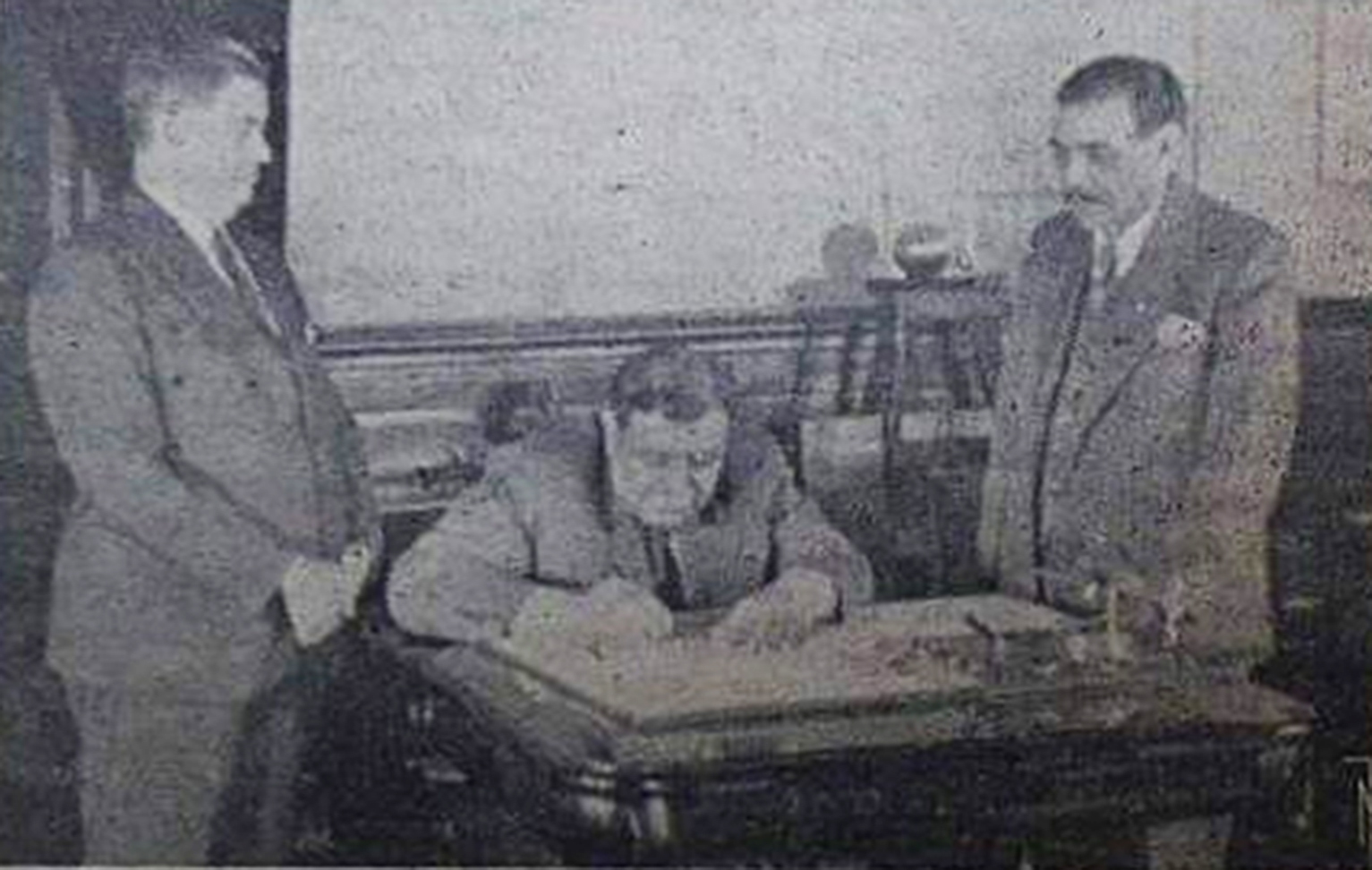
Carías Andino aligned Honduras with the Allies after declaring war on the Axis.

Honduras maintained diplomatic relations with nations that belonged to the Axis until 1941 when it declared war on the Empire of Japan on 8 December 1941 after the Japanese attack on Pearl Harbor, which then spread to Nazi Germany and the Kingdom of Italy on 12 December of the same year. Several Honduran merchant ships were sunk in the Caribbean by German submarines, which had already been sighted in the Gulf of Fonseca and the Caratasca lagoon, therefore air patrols began in 1942.

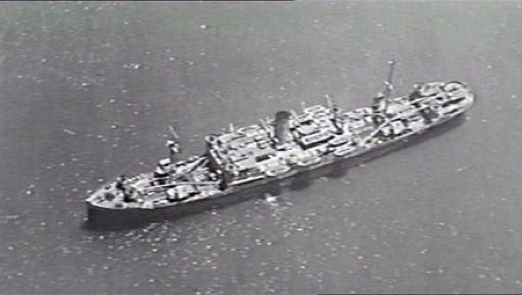
The SS Contessa, a Honduran ship that participated in the Operation Torch in the north African campaign in the Second World War.

This was thanks to the modernization of the Honduran army and the foundation of the Honduran Air Force. The aircraft used for this operation were the North American NA-16, Chance Vought F4U Corsair, and the Boeing Model 40 and Model 95 modified to drop bombs. The first sighting of a German U-boat by the air force occurred on 24 July 1942 and was attacked by planes with 60-pound bombs, being the first and possible only official record of a military confrontation between Honduras and Nazi Germany.

Many of the raw materials produced in Honduras were sent to the North American country to bring supplies to soldiers in the Pacific War against the Japanese. the North African theater, and later with its entry into the European theater in 1944 after the D-Day landing.

==== End of Caria's regime ====
Anxious to curb further disorder in the region, the United States began to urge Carías to step aside and allow free elections when his term of office expired. Carías, by then in his early seventies, ultimately yielded and announced October 1948 elections, in which he would not run. He continued, however, to find ways to use his power. The PNH nominated Carías's choice for president – Juan Manuel Gálvez, who had been minister of war since 1933. Exiled opposition figures were allowed to return to Honduras, and the PLH, trying to overcome years of inactivity and division, nominated Zúñiga Huete, the same individual whom Carías had defeated in 1932. The PLH rapidly became convinced that it had no chance to win and, charging the government with manipulation of the electoral process, boycotted the elections. This act gave Gálvez a virtually unopposed victory, and in January 1949, he assumed the presidency.

Evaluating the Carías presidency is a difficult task. His time in office provided the nation with a badly needed period of relative peace and order. The country's fiscal situation improved steadily, education improved slightly, the road network expanded, and the armed forces were modernized. At the same time, nascent democratic institutions withered, opposition and labor activities were suppressed, and national interests at times were sacrificed to benefit supporters and relatives of Carías or major foreign interests.

=== New Reform (1949–1954) ===
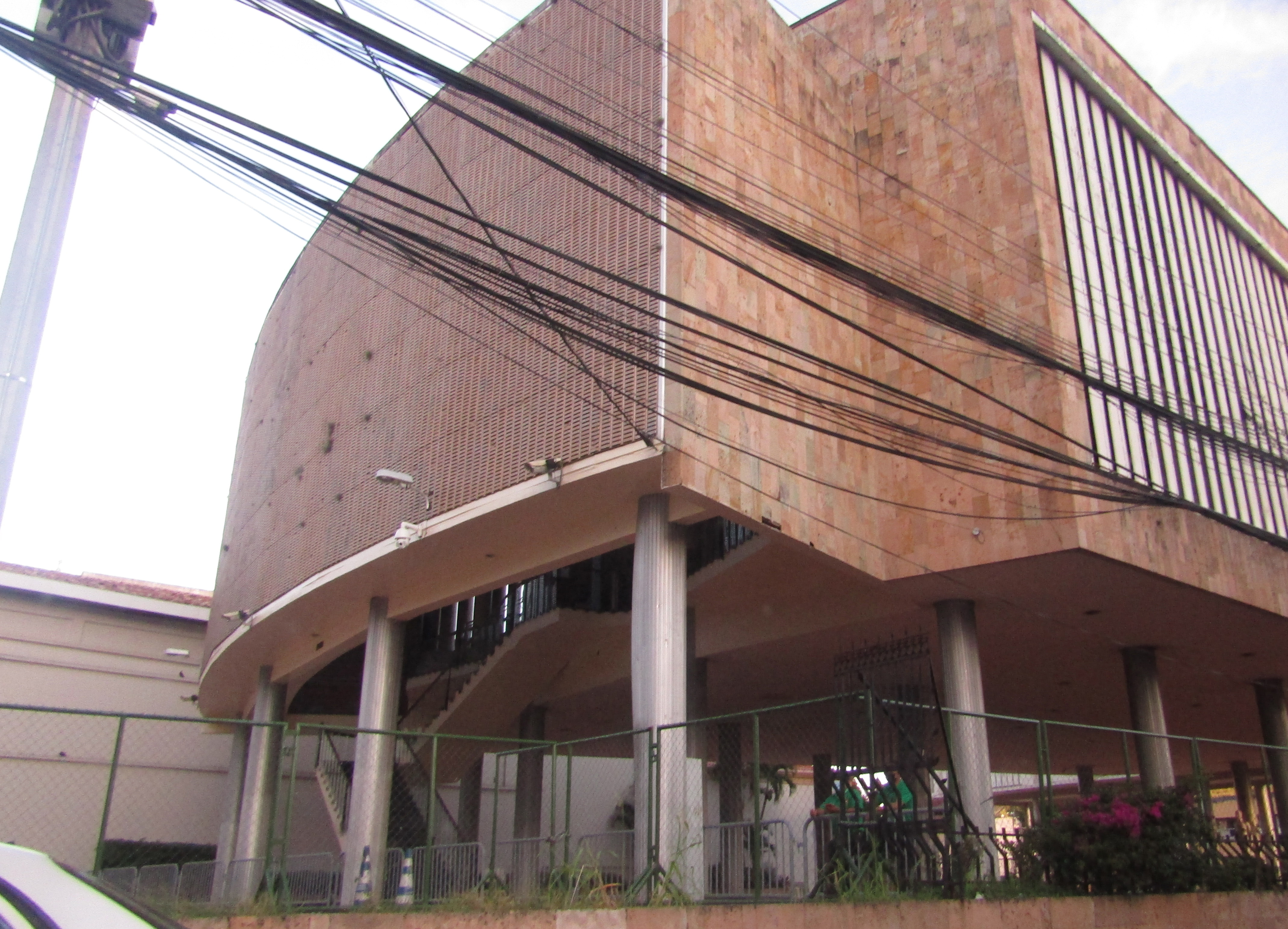
Honduran National Congress, built during the 1950s

Once in office Gálvez showed more independence than expected. He continued and expanded some policies of the Carías administration, such as road building and development of coffee exports. By 1953 nearly one-quarter of the government budget was allocated to road construction. Gálvez also continued most of the prior administration's fiscal policies, reducing external debt and paying off the last of the British bonds. The fruit companies continued to receive favorable treatment at the hands of the Gálvez administration; for example, United Fruit received a highly favorable twenty-five-year contract in 1949.

Galvez however did institute some notable innovations. Education got more attention and a larger share of the national budget. Congress passed an income tax law, although enforcement was sporadic at best. A considerable degree of press freedom was restored, the PLH and other groups were allowed to organize, and some worker organization was permitted. Labor also benefited from legislation during this period. Congress passed, and the president signed, legislation establishing the eight-hour workday, paid holidays for workers, limited employer responsibility for work-related injuries, and regulations over the employment of women and children.

=== 1955–1979 ===
After the general strike in 1954, young military reformists staged a coup in October 1956 that installed a provisional junta. Capital punishment was abolished in 1956, though Honduras had not had an execution since 1940. Constituent assembly elections in 1957 appointed Ramón Villeda Morales as president, and the constituent assembly itself became a national Congress with a 6-year term. The Liberal Party of Honduras (PLH) held power in 1957–63. The military began to become a professional institution independent of politics, with the newly created military academy graduating its first class in 1960.

In October 1963, conservative military officers preempted constitutional elections and deposed Ramón Villeda Morales in a bloody coup. These officers exiled PLH members and governed under General Oswaldo López until 1970.In July 1969, El Salvador invaded Honduras in the short Football War. Tensions in the aftermath of the conflict remain.

A civilian president for the PNH, Ramón Ernesto Cruz, took power briefly in 1970 until, in December 1972, López staged another coup. This time he adopted more progressive policies, including land reform.

On November 22, 1971, the United States handed over the Swan Islands to Honduras after signing the Treaty of the Swan Islands. Honduras began exercising this sovereignty on September 1, 1972.

López' successors continued armed forces modernization, building army and security forces, concentrating on Honduran air force superiority over its neighbors. During the governments of General Juan Alberto Melgar Castro (1975–78) and General Policarpo Paz García (1978–82), Honduras built most of its physical infrastructure and electricity and terrestrial telecommunications systems, both state monopolies. The country experienced economic growth during this period, with greater international demand for its products and increased availability of foreign commercial capital.

=== Constituent assembly (1980) ===
In 1982, the country returned to civilian rule. A constituent assembly was popularly elected in April 1980 and general elections were held in November 1981. A new constitution was approved in 1982 and the PLH government of Roberto Suazo assumed power.

=== 1980s ===
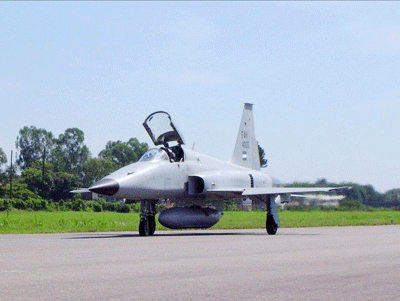
In 1986, Honduras bombed two Nicaraguan towns.

Roberto Suazo Córdova won the elections on an ambitious program of economic and social development to tackle the country's recession. During this time, Honduras also assisted the contra guerillas.

President Suazo launched ambitious social and economic development projects sponsored by American development aid. Honduras became host to the largest Peace Corps mission in the world, and nongovernmental and international voluntary agencies proliferated. From 1972 to 1983, Honduras was governed by military juntas.

Though spared the bloody civil wars wracking its neighbors, the Honduran army quietly waged a campaign against Marxist–Leninist rebels such as the Cinchoneros Popular Liberation Movement, notorious for kidnappings and bombings, and many non-militants. The operation included a campaign of extrajudicial killings by government units, most notably the CIA-trained Battalion 3-16.

Numerous trade unionists, academics, farmers and students disappeared. Declassified documents show that U.S. Ambassador John Negroponte personally intervened to prevent possible disclosures of these crimes, in order to avoid "creating human rights problems in Honduras". The U.S. established a continuing military presence in Honduras to support the Contras in their war against the Sandinista government in Nicaragua, and to support the fight against leftist guerrillas in El Salvador and Guatemala. They also developed an air strip and a modern port in Honduras. U.S. military assistance to Honduras increased from $4 million in 1981 to $77.4 million in 1984.

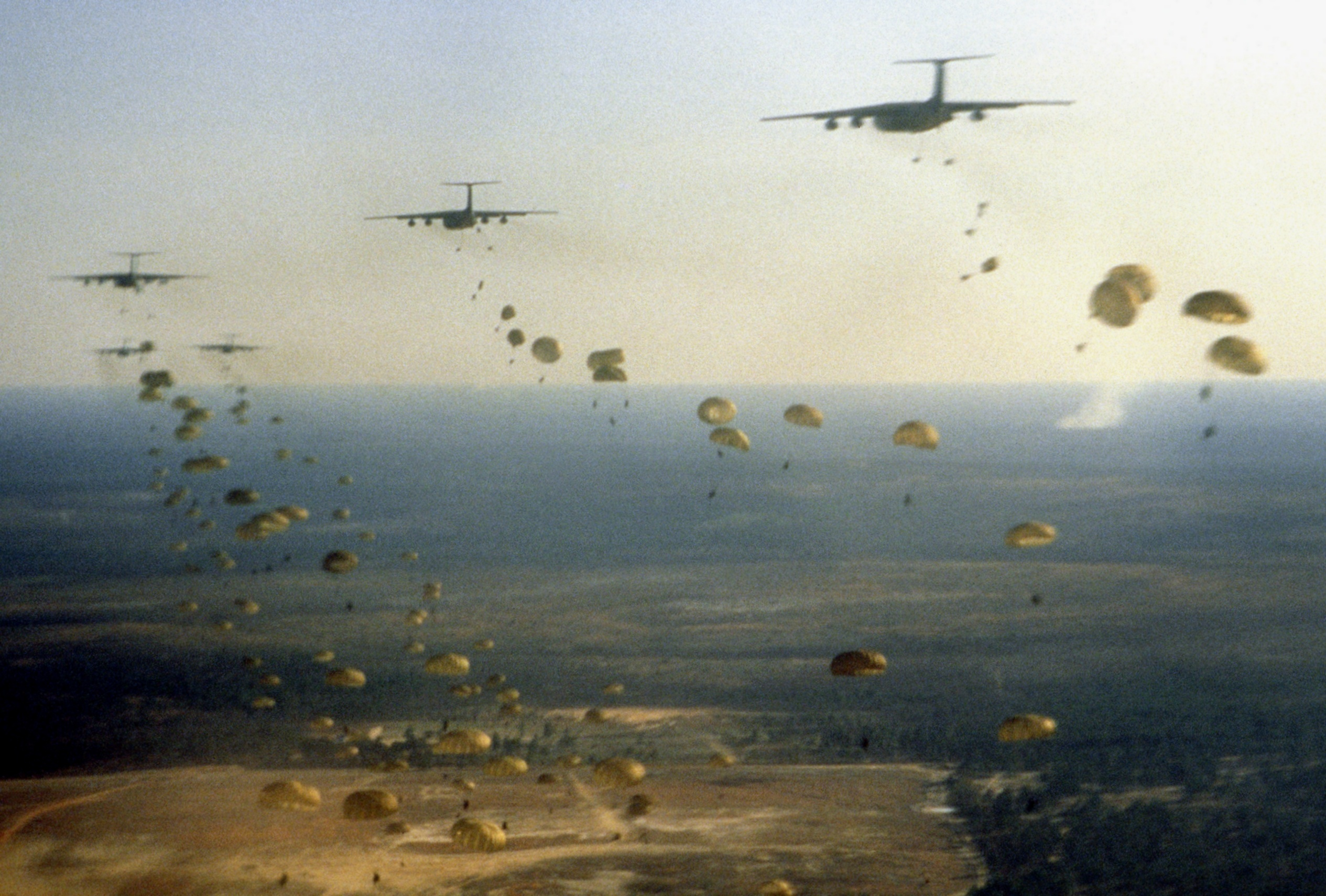
American troops arriving in Honduras in 1988 during Operation Golden Pheasant

President Suazo, relying on U.S. support, created ambitious social and economic development projects to help with a severe economic recession and with the perceived threat of regional instability. As the November 1985 election approached, the PLH could not settle on a presidential candidate and interpreted election law as permitting multiple candidates from any one party. The PLH claimed victory when its presidential candidates collectively outpolled the PNH candidate, Rafael Leonardo Callejas, who received 42% of the total vote. José Azcona, the candidate receiving the most votes (27%) among the PLH, assumed the presidency in January 1986. With strong endorsement and support from the Honduran military, the Suazo administration ushered in the first peaceful transfer of power between civilian presidents in more than 30 years. In 1989 he oversaw the dismantling of Contras which were based in Honduras.

In 1988, in Operation Golden Pheasant, US forces were deployed to Honduras in response to Nicaraguan attacks on Contra supply caches in Honduras.

=== 1990s ===
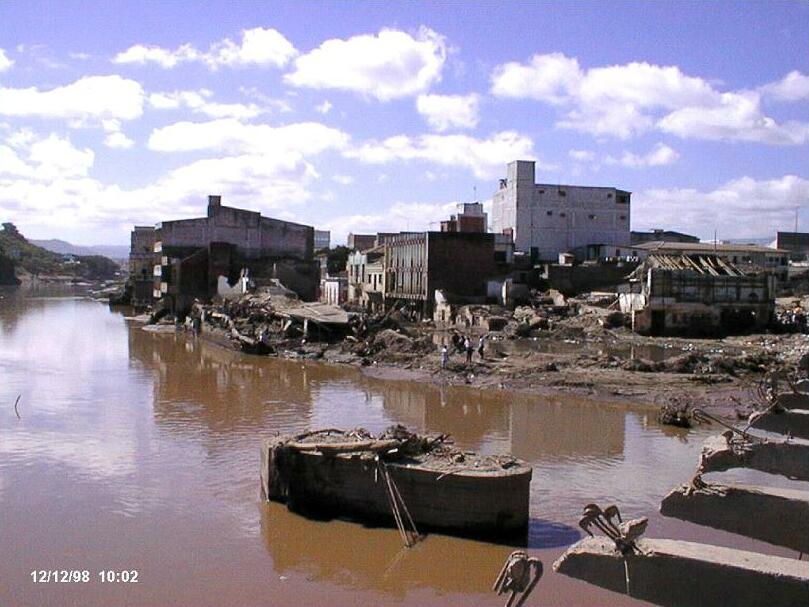
Tegucigalpa after the Mitch Hurricane.

In January 1990, Rafael Leonardo Callejas won the presidential election and took office, concentrating on economic reform and reducing the deficit. He began a movement to place the military under civilian control and laid the groundwork for the creation of the public prosecution service. In 1993, PLH candidate Carlos Roberto Reina was elected with 56% of the vote against PNH contender Oswaldo Ramos Soto. He won on a platform calling for "moral revolution" and made active efforts to prosecute corruption and pursue those responsible for alleged human rights abuses in the 1980s. The Reina administration successfully increased civilian control over the armed forces and transferred the national police from military to civilian authority. In 1996, Reina named his own defense minister, breaking the precedent of accepting the nominee of the armed forces leadership.

His administration substantially increased Central Bank net international reserves, reduced inflation to 12.8% a year, restored a better pace of economic growth (about 5% in 1997), and held down spending to achieve a 1.1% non-financial public sector deficit in 1997.

The Liberal Party of Honduras (PLH)'s Carlos Roberto Flores took office 27 January 1998 as Honduras' fifth democratically elected president since free elections were restored in 1981, with a 10% margin over his main opponent, PNH nominee Nora Gúnera de Melgar, widow of former leader Juan Alberto Melgar). Flores inaugurated International Monetary Fund (IMF) programs of reform and modernization of the Honduran government and economy, with emphasis on maintaining the country's fiscal health and improving international competitiveness.

In October 1998, Hurricane Mitch devastated Honduras, leaving more than 5,000 people dead and 1.5 million displaced. Damages totaled nearly $3 billion. International donors came forward to assist in rebuilding infrastructure, donating US$1400 million in 2000.

== 21st century ==
=== 2000s ===
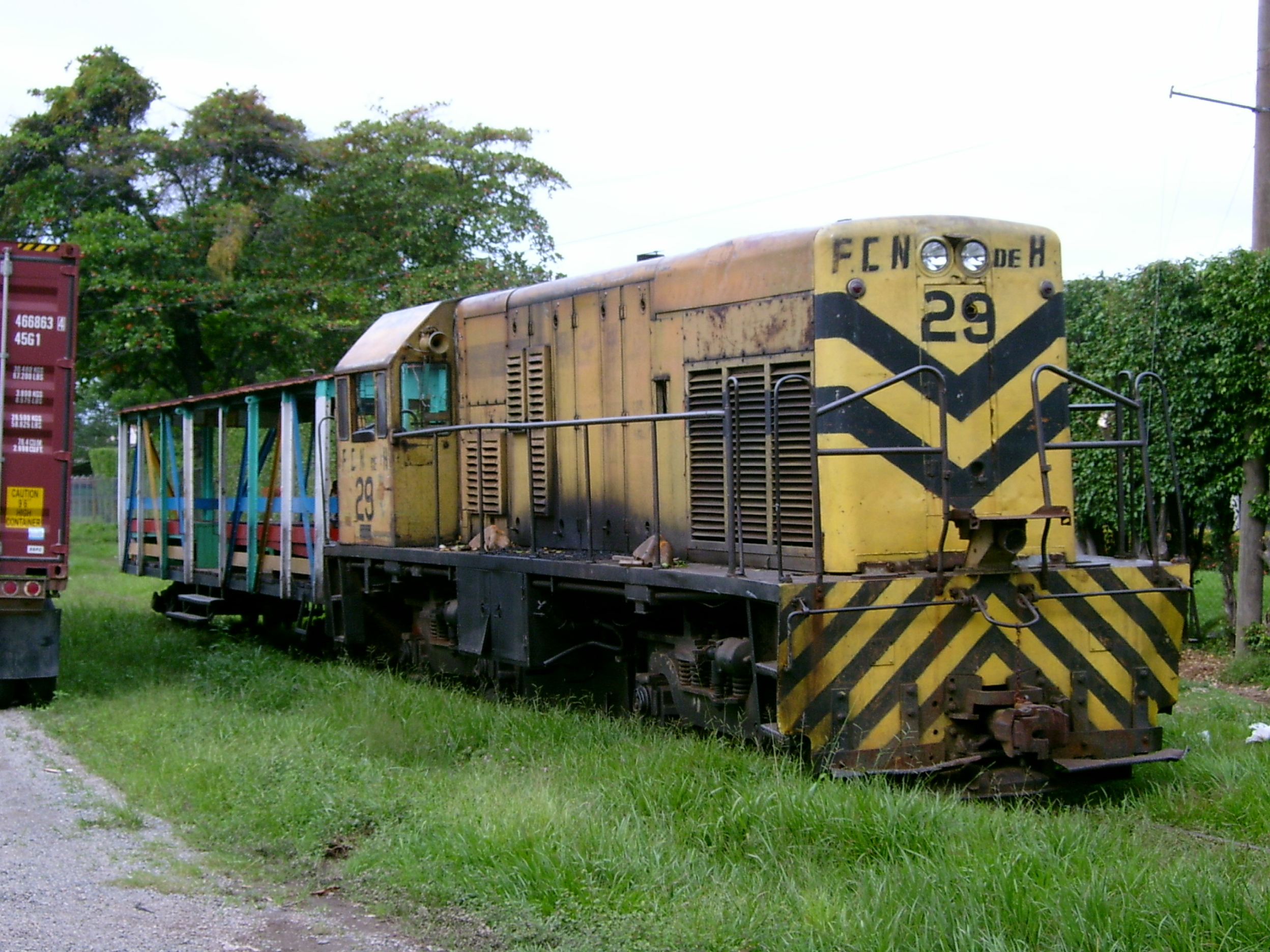
The railroad transportation suffered a lot of economic issues and disadvantages during the 2000s, it was not until 2010 passenger trains where reactivated.

In November 2001, the National Party won presidential and parliamentary elections. The PNH gained 61 seats in Congress and the PLH won 55. The PLH candidate Rafael Pineda was defeated by the PNH candidate Ricardo Maduro, who took office in January 2002. Maduro administration emphasized stopping mara growth, especially Mara 18 and Mara Salvatrucha.

On 27 November 2005, the PLH candidate Manuel Zelaya beat the PNH candidate and current Head of Congress Porfirio "Pepe" Lobo, and became the new president on 27 January 2006.

Jose Manuel Zelaya Rosales of the Liberal Party of Honduras won 27 November 2005 presidential elections with less than a 4% margin of victory, the smallest margin ever in Honduran electoral history. Zelaya's campaign theme was "citizen power," and he vowed to increase transparency and combat narcotrafficking while maintaining macroeconomic stability. The Liberal Party won 62 of the 128 congressional seats, just short of an absolute majority.

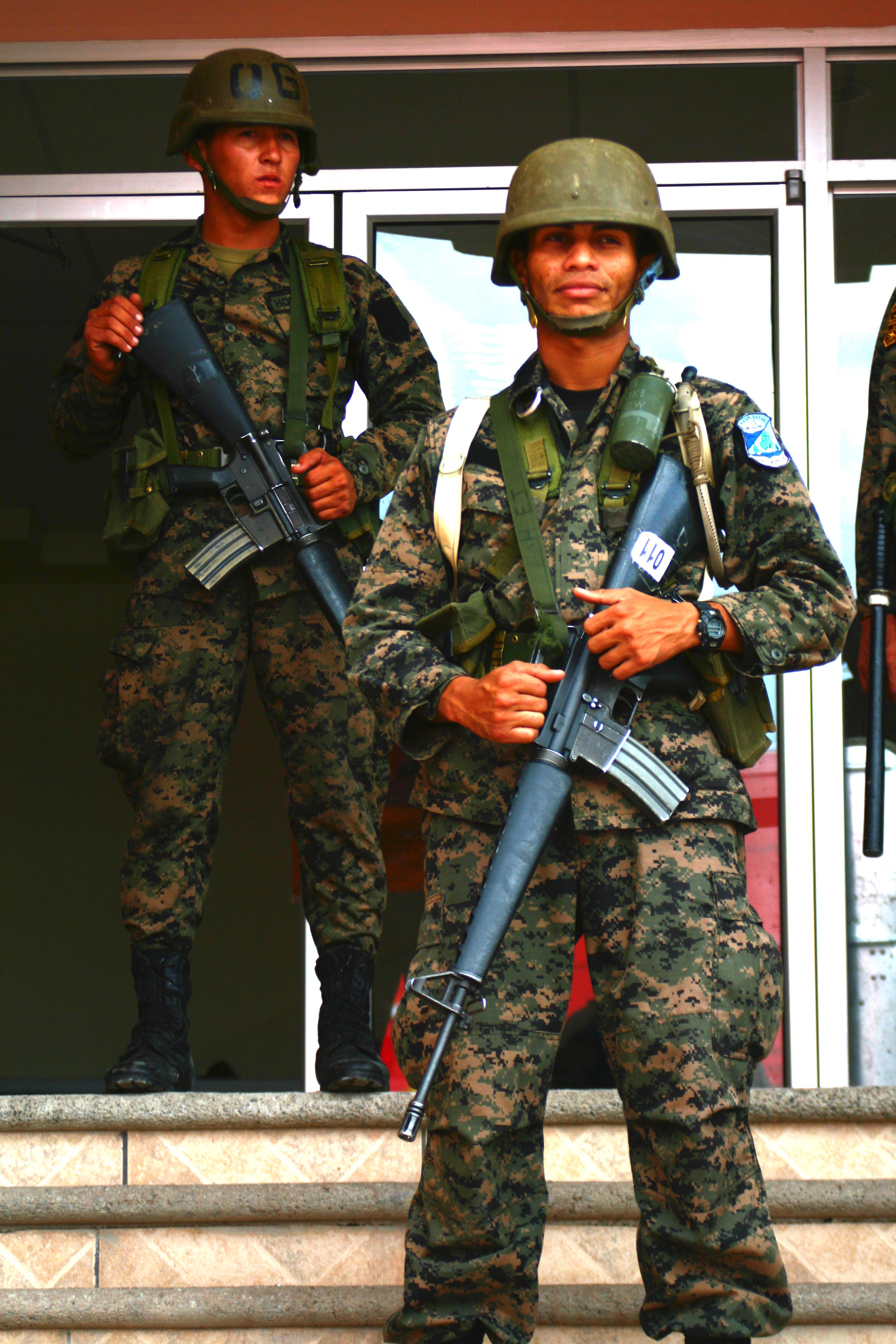
After the 2009 coup d'état, the military presence in the streets began to be more common.

In 2009 Zelaya caused controversy with his call to have a constitutional referendum in June to decide about convening a Constitutional National Assembly to formulate a new constitution. The constitution explicitly bars changes to some of its clauses, including the term limit, and the move precipitated a Constitutional Crisis. An injunction against holding the referendum was issued by the Honduran Supreme Court.

Zelaya rejected the ruling and sacked Romeo Vásquez Velásquez, the head of Honduras's armed forces. Vásquez had refused to help with the referendum because he did not want to violate the law. The sacking was deemed unlawful by the Supreme Court as well as by Congress and Vásquez was reinstated. The President then further defied the Supreme Court by pressing ahead with the vote, which the Court had deemed "illegal". The military had confiscated the ballots and polls in a military base in Tegucigalpa. On 27 June, a day before the election, Zelaya followed by a big group of supporters entered the base and ordered, as Commanding Officer of the Armed Forces, for the ballots and polls to be returned to him. Congress saw this as an abuse of power and ordered his capture.

On 28 June 2009, the military removed Zelaya from office and deported him to Costa Rica, a neutral country. Elvin Santos, the vice-president during the start of Zelaya's term, had resigned in order to run for president in the coming elections, and by a presidential line of succession the head of Congress, Roberto Micheletti, was appointed president. However, due to the stance taken by the United Nations and the Organization of American States on the use of military force to depose a president, most countries in the region and in the world continued to recognize Zelaya as the President of Honduras and denounced the actions as an assault on democracy.

Honduras continued to be ruled by Micheletti's administration under strong foreign pressure. On 29 November, democratic general elections were held, with former Congressional president and 2005 nominee, Pepe Lobo as victor.

=== 2010s ===
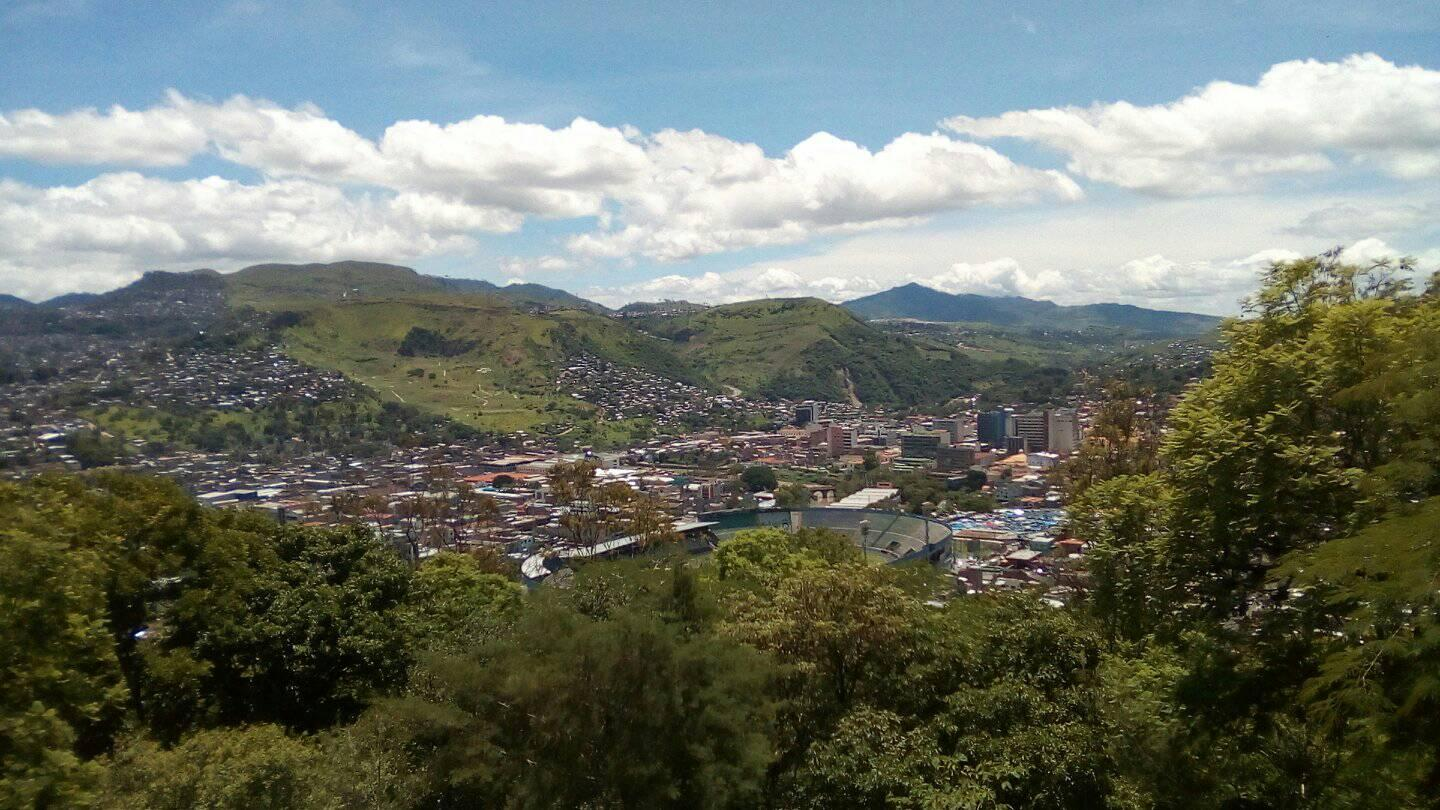
City of Comayagüela in the 2010s

Inaugurated on 27 January 2010, Porfirio "Pepe" Lobo Sosa and his administration focused throughout the first year for foreign recognition of presidential legitimacy and Honduras's reinstitution in the OAS.

Honduras became the only country in the world to ban the morning-after pill in 2012.

After the presidential period of Lobo Sosa, Juan Orlando Hernández defeated Xiomara Castro, wife of ousted former president Manuel Zelaya, in the general elections in 2013. During the first years of his presidency the economic growth helped to improve the infrastructure of the main cities. However, unemployment and social unrest increased during his first term. He opened the possibility of changing the constitution, enraging a considerable part of the population. In 2015, the supreme court of Honduras removed a single-term limit for the country's presidency. President Juan Orlando Hernández was reelected in 2017, winning the election through an alleged electoral fraud that produced constant protests and violence in the streets. In 2019, Juan Orlando Hernández's younger brother Juan Antonio "Tony" Hernández was brought to trial in New York for drug trafficking. He was convicted of all four charges against him, including drug trafficking and lying to authorities.

=== 2020s ===
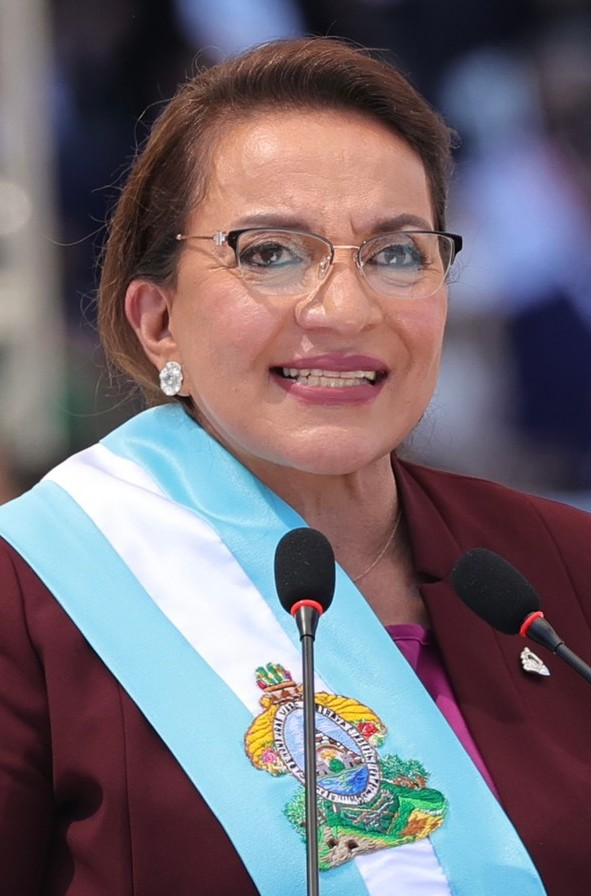
Xiomara Castro became the first woman to gain a presidential charge in Honduras.

In September 2020, Honduran President Juan Orlando Hernández announced that Honduras will relocate its embassy to Israel from Tel Aviv to Jerusalem. Honduras became the third country in the world after the United States and Guatemala to establish embassies to Israel in Jerusalem.

In January 2021, Honduras changed the country's constitution to make it almost impossible to legalize abortion in the future. Before that, Honduras was already one of few countries with a complete ban on abortion. The constitutional reform was supported by Honduran President Juan Orlando Hernández's ruling National Party.

On 28 November 2021, the former first lady Xiomara Castro, leftist presidential candidate of opposition Liberty and Refoundation Party, won 53% of the votes in the presidential election to become the first female president of Honduras. On 27 January 2022, Xiomara Castro was sworn in as Honduras' president. Her husband, Manuel Zelaya, hold the same office from 2006 until 2009.

In April 2022, former president of Honduras, Juan Orlando Hernández, who served two terms between 2014 and January 2022, was extradited to the United States to face charges of drug trafficking and money laundering. Hernandez denied the accusations. He was sentenced to 45 years in prison, but president Donald Trump pardoned him in November 2025, meaning he was freed from the prison. On 27 January 2026, Nasry Asfura of the National Party was sworn in as president of Honduras after winning the 2025 general election. In July 2026, former president Juan Orlando Hernandez returned to Honduras. In 2026, the new Honduran government of president Nasry Asfura has maintained a very close relationship with the United States.

== See also ==
- List of presidents of Honduras
- Politics of Honduras
- Hondurans

General:

- History of the Americas
- History of Central America
- History of Latin America
- History of North America
- Spanish colonization of the Americas
