= History of Honduras (1932–1982) =

Republic of Honduras
- 1932–1982
- Top: Flag (1932–1949); Bottom: Flag (1949–1982) Coat of arms
- Motto: 'Libre, Soberana e Independiente' (Spanish) 'Free, Sovereign and Independent'
- Anthem: Himno Nacional de Honduras (English: "Honduras National Anthem")
- Capital: Tegucigalpa
- Government: Unitary presidential republic under an authoritarian dictatorship (1932–1949) under a military junta (1956–1957) under an authoritarian military dictatorship (1963–1982)
- President
  - 1932–1949: Tiburcio Carías Andino (first)
  - 1978–1982: Policarpo Paz García (last)
- Vice President
  - 1932–1982: List
- Legislature: National Congress
- Historical era: Interwar period, Second World War, Cold War
  - Carías assumes the presidency: 16 November 1932
  - 1956 Honduran coup d'état: 21 October 1956
  - 1963 Honduran coup d'état: 3 October 1963
  - Football War: 14–18 July 1969
  - 1975 Honduran coup d'état: 22 April 1975
  - Roberto Suazo Córdova becomes the president: 27 January 1982
- Currency: Lempira (HNL)
- ISO 3166 code: HN
Preceded by	Succeeded by
Honduras	Honduras

Authoritarian General Tiburcio Carías Andino controlled Honduras during the Great Depression, until 1948. In 1956—after two authoritarian administrations and a general strike initiated by banana workers—young military reformists staged a coup that installed a provisional junta and paved the way for constituent assembly elections in 1957. This assembly appointed Ramón Villeda Morales as president and transformed itself into a national legislature with a 6-year term.

In 1963, conservative military officers preempted constitutional elections and deposed Villeda in a bloody coup. The armed forces, led by Gen. Oswaldo López Arellano, governed until 1971. Popular discontent continued to rise after a 1969 border war with El Salvador, known as the "Soccer War". A civilian President—Ramón Ernesto Cruz of the National Party—took power briefly in 1971 but proved unable to manage the government.

In 1972, Gen. Lopez staged another coup. Lopez adopted more progressive policies, including land reform, but his regime was brought down in the mid-1970s by corruption scandals. The regimes of Gen. Juan Alberto Melgar Castro (1975–78) and Gen. Policarpo Paz García (1978–82) largely built the current physical infrastructure and telecommunications system of Honduras. The country also enjoyed its most rapid economic growth during this period, due to greater international demand for its products and the availability of foreign commercial lending.

Following the overthrow of Anastasio Somoza Debayle in Nicaragua in 1979 and general instability in El Salvador at the time, Hondurans elected a constituent assembly in 1980 and voted in general elections in 1981; the Liberal Party government of President Roberto Suazo Córdova took office.

== The era of Tiburcio Carías Andino, 1932–1954 ==
=== Election of Carías ===
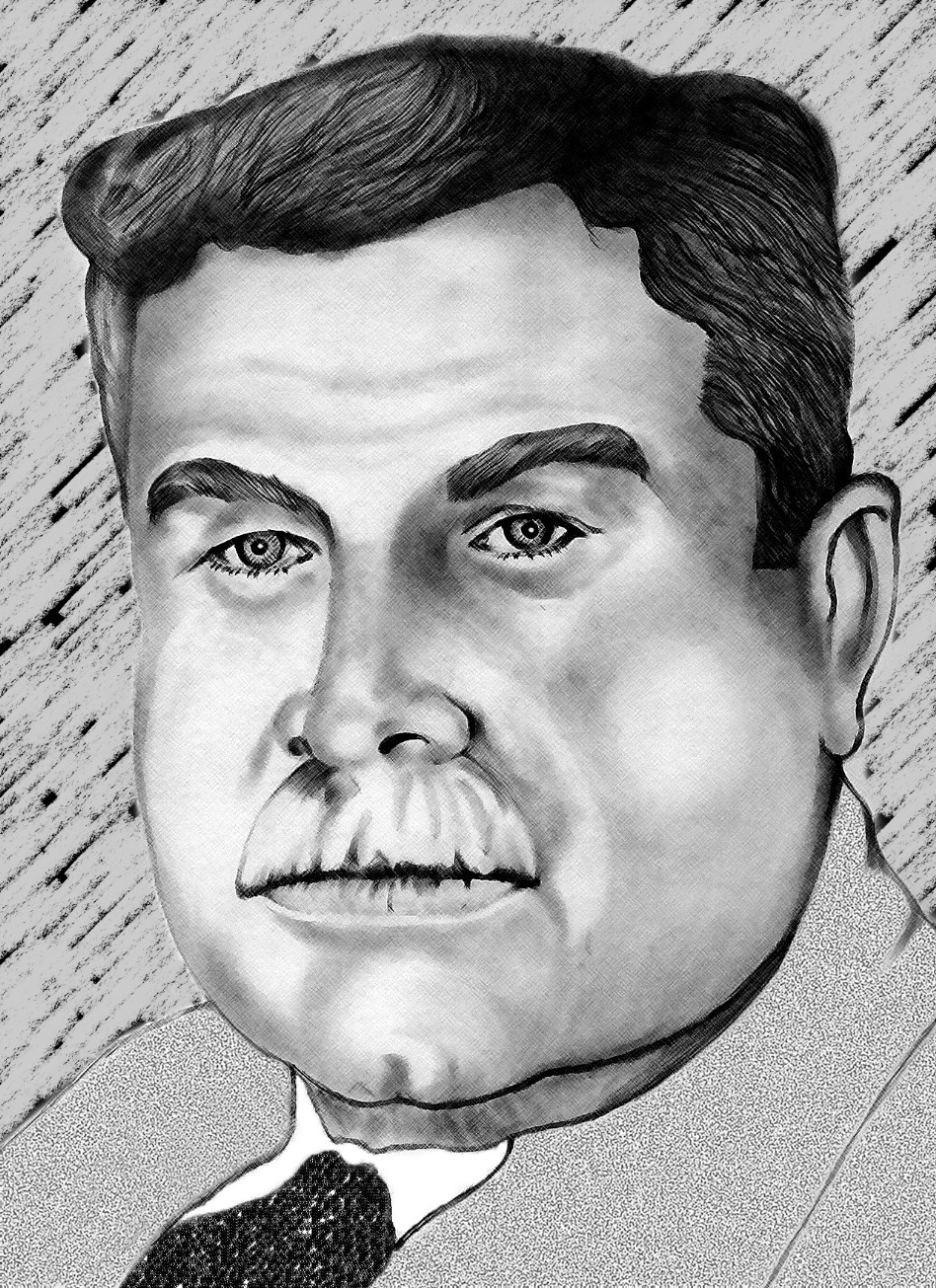
Tiburcio Carías Andino

In spite of increasing unrest and grave economic tensions, the elections of 1932 were relatively peaceful and just. In February 1932, the National Party of Honduras (PNH) nominated Carías as its presidential candidate; initially Venancio Alleys was nominated as vice-president but when he declined, Abraham Williams Calderón was appointed. The liberals for their part appointed Ángel Zúñiga Huete as their candidate. Carias won the elections by a margin of some 20,000 votes. The General assumed power on 16 November 1932, in what would become the longest period of a single government, in the history of Honduras.

Initially, it was thought that the government of Carías, like that of his predecessors, would not survive for long. Shortly before his inauguration, liberal dissidents rose in rebellion. As Carías took control of the government forces, he obtained weapons in El Salvador and in quickly crushed the uprising.

During the first part of his administration, Carías focused on avoiding financial collapse, improving the armed forces, and building roads. At the same time, he established the foundations to help him prolong his stay in the power.

Honduras' economy continued to be bad through the decade of the 1930s. In addition to the drastic fall in banana exports caused by the reduced consumer demand from The Great Depression, the banana industry was threatened in 1935, by epidemics like the Black Sigatoka. In a year, extensive areas including those in the zone of Trujillo, were abandoned, and thousands of Hondurans remained without work. By 1937 the plague was under control but a lot of zones affected remained without production. Because of this, Honduras lost a big part of the international market.

Carías had made an effort to improve the armed forces, even before he became president. Once in power, his motivation to continue his work increased. He gave special attention to the decadent Air Force by founding the Military School of Aviation (1934) with an American colonel in command.

With the passage of time, Carías moved slowly but without pause, to reinforce his power. He won the support of the banana companies through opposition to strikes and other labor riots. He strengthened his position in the national financial circles and with foreigners through conservative economic politics. Even at the peak of the depression, he continued making regular payments on the external debt, adhering strictly to the terms of the agreement with the shareholders of British Bonds. Likewise, he satisfied the other creditors. Two small loans were paid completely in 1935.

=== Repression ===
Political controls were slowly initiated under the government of Carías. The Communist Party of Honduras (PCH) was declared illegal. But the Liberal Party of Honduras (PLH) was still active. Even the leaders of a small uprising in 1935 were offered free aerial transport if they wished to return to Honduras.

By the end of 1935, emphasizing the need for internal order and peace, Carías began to repress the press and the political activities against him.

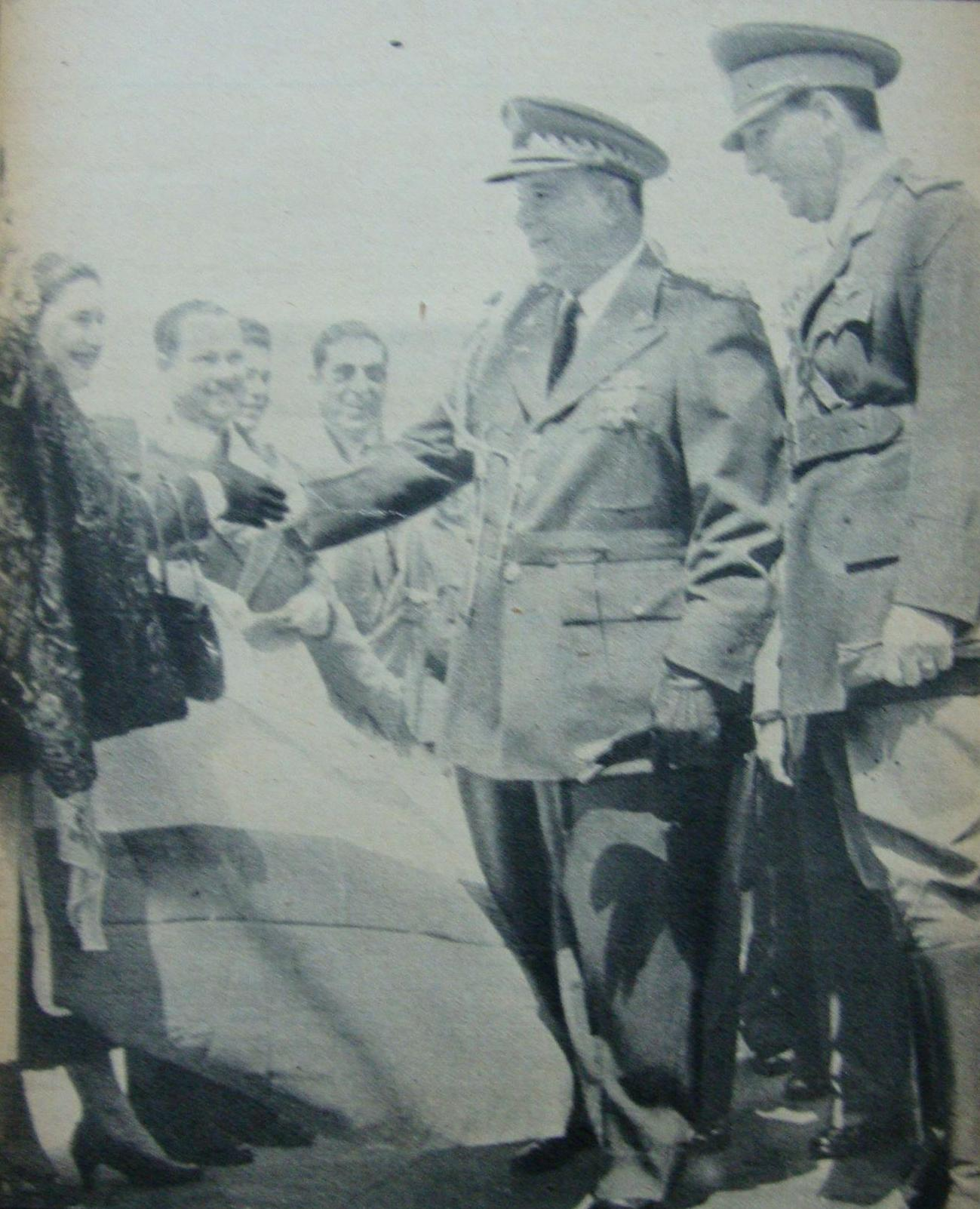
The relations between Anastasio Somoza García and Carías were taut, because of border disputes

On the other hand, the PNH began a publishing campaign doing upsetting in the continuity of Carías so that it continued the peace and the order in the country. However, the Constitution of 1924 like the one of 1894 forbade the reelection. Carías presented his plan of reelection in front of the delegation of the United States in Tegucigalpa. The Americans concluded that if similar governments had been established in Guatemala, El Salvador and Nicaragua, did not see why Carías could not extend his mandate. In this way United States threw by embroiders it the 'Treaty of 1923'.

The General Carías then summoned to a national constituent assembly to modify the constitution. This assembly chose to the 'dedazo' incorporated 30 articles of the Constitution of 1924 in the new constitution. The main changes were the elimination of the prohibition on the immediate reelection of the president and the vice-president and the extension of the presidential term from four to six years. Other changes included restoration of the death penalty, the reduction of the powers of the legislature, and the denial of the citizenship and the right to the vote of women.

The opposition Liberal Party (PLH) and other sectors reacted to these changes, treating to overthrow to Carías. Numerous efforts did in 1936 and 1937, but without success. Toward the end of the decade of 1930, the National Party was the only political organization recognized in the nation. Numerous leaders' opposition leaders were imprisoned, and some were chained and forced to work in the streets of Tegucigalpa. Others, including the leader of the PLH, Zúñiga Huete, had exiled.

During his presidency, Carías cultivated a narrow relation with his fellow dictators of Central America, generals: Jorge Ubico of Guatemala, Maximiliano Hernández Martínez of El Salvador, and Anastasio Somoza García of Nicaragua. His narrower relation was with the dictator Ubico, who helped to Carías to reorganize his secret police, and also captured and shot the leader of an uprising in Honduras who had committed the error of crossing into Guatemalan territory. The relations with Nicaragua were somewhat tenser in consequence of the border dispute. But Carías and Somoza succeeded in keeping under control this dispute from 1930 to 1940.

=== Last period of Carías ===
When winning the second period of six years, ratified the Article of the Constitution that prorrogó the presidential period to said six years and the Presidency in the General headlines Carías and Williams until 31 December 1948.

In 1944 the bonds of Carías with these dictators turned into something not wanted, once those popular uprisings deposed to Situate of Guatemala and to the Salvadorian Martínez Hernández. During a time, seemed as if the revolutionary contagion extended to Honduras.

A plot of civilians and military with the purpose to overthrow Carías was discovered, but crushed by the government in 1943. In May 1944, a group of women began to protest out of the Presidential Palace of Tegucigalpa, to demand the release of the political prisoners. In spite of the strong measures taken by the government, the tension grew and Carías was forced finally to free to some prisoners. This gesture did not satisfy the opposition, and the demonstrations against the government followed extending.

In July several demonstrators were murdered by governmental troops in San Pedro Sula. In October, a group of exiled invaded to Honduras from El Salvador but did not succeed in his efforts for overthrowing to the government. The soldiers remained loyal, and Carías continued in the charge.

== Juan Manuel Gálvez ==
=== Election and exert of Gálvez ===
The government of the United States wanted to be done with problems in Central America. Therefore, it urged Carías to allow free elections once his current term ended. For that then, Carías, had more than seventy years. The general yielded to pressure and announced elections for October 1948, in which it would abstain to present a candidate. Nevertheless, Carías found ways to use his power.

General Carias nominated his ex-minister of war (1933), Juan Manuel Gálvez as a presidential candidate for the National Party. On the other hand, exiled opposition figures were authorized to return to Honduras. Of this form, the PLH, treating to surpass years of inactivity and division, nominated to Ángel Zúñiga Huete as its presidential candidate.

But the liberals, quickly convinced that they did not have any possibility of winning and, accusing to the government of manipulation of the electoral process, boycotted the elections. This gave to Gálvez a victory without opposition and in January 1949 he assumed the presidency.

Once president, Gálvez showed to be an independent person. Much more of what had anticipated. President Gálvez adopted some policies of Carías, such as the construction of roads and the development of the exports of coffee. In 1953 almost a fourth part of the budget of the government devoted to the construction of roads.

Gálvez also followed the greater part of the fiscal politics of the previous administration, the reduction of the external debt, and paying off the last of the British bonds. The fruit companies followed receiving a good deal by part of Gálvez. For example, in 1949, United Fruit received a favorable agreement of twenty-five years.

In addition, Gálvez established some remarkable changes in comparison to the last fifteen years. The education received greater attention and began to perceive a greater part of the national budget. The congress approved a law of income tax, although its application was sporadic at best.

The most evident change was in the political sand. A considerable degree of freedom of press was restored. The Liberal Party was allowed to reorganize, as well as other political groups. The workers also benefited during this period. He established the working time of 8 hours, paid holidays paid, and responsibility of the employer for workplace safety and regulations of the employment of women and boys.

=== The strike of 1954 ===
The relative peace that Honduras had enjoyed for almost two decades was destroyed by a series of events during the last year (1954) of Gálvez' term. Tension in the entire Central American region increased with a confrontation developed between the left-leaning government of President Jacobo Arbenz Guzmán of Guatemala and the United States.

Part of this confrontation was due to the expropriation of land from the United Fruit Company by the Guatemalan government. Likewise the United States accused the government of Arbenz Guzmán of boosting the agitation among the workers of the Fruit Company. In 1952 the United States had considered taking action to overthrow the Guatemalan president. But the government of Gálvez, which had given asylum to opponents to this government between them Carlos Castillo Armas, that did not want to cooperate in the direct actions against of Guatemala, and the plans were not activated.

This was until the principles of 1954 when a big covert operation developed in Honduran territory against the Guatemalan president. The government of Honduras had shown worry, because of the tensions between the workers of the banana industry and United Fruit. The administration of Gálvez concluded that this was due to the influence that the left-handed government of Guatemala had on the Honduran workers.

For the principles of May 1954, the tensions had increased. In the first place, they gave a series of strikes against the operations of the United Fruit Company in the coast north of Honduras. To the few days, the strike extended and included the operations of the Standard Fruit Company, with which the banana sector of the country arrived to a deadlock.

The strikers presented a wide range of complaints. Between which include: The increase of wage, better conditions of work, medical profits, payment of extra hours, and the right to the collective negotiation. The initial efforts of the government to put end to the strike failed and the unemployment began to extend to other industries. On 21 May, the number of strikers approached to 30.000, and the economy of the country was under strong pressure.

In addition to having to deal with the strike, the government was increasingly involved in the movement to overthrow the government of Arbenz in Guatemala. To finals of May, an agreement of military assistance subscribed between the United States and Honduras, and big quantities of American arms were sent quickly to Honduras.

A big part of this help received send to the rebellious anti-Arbenz headed by Castle Arm. In June these strengths crossed the border of Guatemala and after several days of political maneuvers, and little armed fight, Arbenz escaped to the exile and Castle Arm took the power in this country.

With the overthrow of Arbenz finished the foreign influence between the Honduran workers. The strike finished in July of this year, the sindical leaders that had been accused to have bonds with Guatemala were imprisoned, but the banana companies yielded to some demands of the workers. This marked the beginning of a labor strength more organized and the decrease in the power of the companies fruteras.

=== The constitutional crisis of 1954 ===
In the midst of these conflicts, campaigning for the elections of 1954 continued. Dissatisfied with some of Gálvez's policies towards liberalization, Carías decided to run for president despite his advanced age, ensuring the nomination of the PNH. This move, however, divided the party. The most moderate members separated from the party and formed the National Revolutionary Movement (MNR). Its candidate was ex-vice president Abraham Williams Calderón. This division among the nationalists moved the Liberals to unite behind the candidacy of Ramón Villeda Morales, a doctor from Tegucigalpa. The campaign, as well as the elections, were very free and honest. On 10 October 1954, roughly 260,000 of the more than 400,000 voters voted. Villeda Moral won the elections with 121,213 votes, Carías received 77,041, and Williams carried 53,041.

The Liberal Party of Honduras (PLH) also obtained the majority in the legislative body. But under the Constitution, Villeda did not obtain the necessary majority of votes to be president (-8000 votes). Something similar took place in 1924. This situation left the decision to choose the new president in the hands of the legislative body. To complicate things more, Gálvez went to Miami, purportedly to receive medical treatment, although some sources say that he simply fled the country, leaving the government in the hands of vice-president Julio Lozano Díaz.

The National Party (PNH) and the Revolutionary Nationalist Movement (MNR) did not accept the election of Villeda and boycotted the legislative assembly, producing a constitutional crisis. According to the constitution, the Supreme Court of Justice had to choose the president. As the court was dominated by Carías appointees, the Liberal Party of Honduras was opposed to such a course of action. In this conjuncture, Lozano Díaz suddenly suspended the legislative body and proclaimed himself president until new elections can take place.

== Labor unrest and political transition 1954–1957 ==
The relative peace that Honduras had enjoyed for nearly two decades was shattered by a series of events during 1954, Gálvez's last year in office. Tension throughout the region had been increasing steadily as a confrontation developed between the United States and the left-leaning government of President Jacobo Arbenz Guzmán in Guatemala. Part of the confrontation involved the expropriation of United Fruit Company lands and charges that the Guatemalan government was encouraging agitation among the banana workers.

In 1952, the United States had begun considering actions to overthrow the Guatemalan government. Honduras had given asylum to several exiled opponents of Arbenz, including Colonel Carlos Castillo Armas, but Gálvez was reluctant to cooperate in direct actions against Guatemala, and the plans were not activated. By early 1954, however, a major covert operation against Guatemala was being organized, this time with greater Honduran cooperation. One reason for the cooperation was the Honduran government's concern over increased labor tensions in the banana-producing areas, tensions that the fruit companies blamed, in part, on Guatemalan influence.

Starting in early May 1954, the tensions escalated to strikes. First, a series of strikes broke out against United Fruit Company operations on Honduras's Caribbean coast. Within a few days, the strike spread to include the Standard Fruit Company operations, bringing the banana industry in the country to a near standstill. The strikers presented a wide range of grievances, involving wages, working conditions, medical benefits, overtime pay, and the right to collective bargaining. Initial government efforts to end the strike failed, and work stoppages began to spread into other industries. By May 21, the number of strikers was approaching 30,000, and the nation's economy was under severe strain.

As the strike was spreading, Honduras was also becoming more deeply involved in the movement to topple the Arbenz government in Guatemala. In late May, a military assistance agreement was concluded between the United States and Honduras, and large quantities of United States arms were quickly shipped to Honduras. Much of this incoming assistance was passed on to anti-Arbenz rebels commanded by Castillo Armas. In June these forces crossed into Guatemala and after several days of political maneuvering but little actual fighting, Arbenz fled into exile, and Castillo Armas became president.

With the spectre of foreign influence over the strike thus removed, negotiations began, and the strike ended in early July. Labor leaders who had been accused of having ties with Guatemala were jailed, and the final settlement, which met few of the original demands, was signed with elements more acceptable to the government and the fruit companies than to the workers. Despite the limited gains, however, the strike did mark a major step toward greater influence for organized labor in Honduras and a decline in the power of the fruit companies.

=== 1954 election ===
In the midst of these conflicts, the campaign for the 1954 elections continued. Unhappy with some of Gálvez's gestures toward liberalization, Carías, despite his advanced age, decided to run for president and secured the PNH nomination. This move, however, split the party, and more moderate members broke away to form the Revolutionary Nationalist Movement (Movimiento Nacional Revolucionario, MNR). Their nominee was former vice president Abraham Williams Calderón. The split in the ruling party encouraged the PLH, who united behind Ramón Villeda Morales, a Tegucigalpa physician who was seen as somewhat to the left of center in the party's political spectrum.

Both the campaign and the election were remarkably free and honest. On October 10, 1954, approximately 260,000 out of over 400,000 eligible voters went to the polls. Villeda Morales won a large plurality with 121,213 votes, Carías received 77,041, and Williams carried 53,041. The PLH also gained a plurality in the legislature. Under Honduran law, however, a majority of the total votes was required to be elected president; Villeda Morales lacked a majority by just over 8,000 votes. The stage was set for a repeat of the confusing paralysis of 1924 because the constitution required, first, that two-thirds of the members of the new legislature must be present and vote to choose a president and, second, that the victor must receive two-thirds of the legislature's vote. To complicate matters further, Gálvez left for Miami (reportedly to obtain medical treatment, although some sources claim he merely fled the country), leaving the government in the hands of Vice President Julio Lozano Díaz.

Unable to reconcile their differences and unwilling to accept Villeda Morales as president, the PNH and MNR deputies boycotted the legislature, producing a national crisis. The constitution provided that in case of congressional deadlock the Supreme Court of Justice would select the president. Dominated as the court was by Carías appointees, the PLH opposed such a course of action. At this juncture, Lozano Díaz suddenly suspended the legislature and announced that he would act as president until new elections could be held. He declared that he would form a national government with cabinet members taken from all major parties and received pledges of support from all three candidates in the 1954 election. A Council of State, headed by a PLH member but including members of all three major parties, was appointed to replace the suspended congress until a constituent assembly could be chosen to write yet another constitution.

Lozano Díaz began his period as president with a broad base of support that eroded rapidly. He unveiled an ambitious development plan to be financed by international loans and increased taxes and also introduced the nation's first labor code. This document guaranteed workers the right to organize and strike but gave employers the right of lockout and forbade strikes in public services. The code also embodied some social welfare and minimum-wage provisions and regulated hours and working conditions. All these provisions gained him some labor support, but in later months relations between the president and labor began to sour.

As time passed, it became clear that Lozano Díaz had ambitions to replace the traditional parties with one that he controlled and could use to help prolong his hold on power. He reduced the Council of State to a consultative body, postponed elections, and set about forming his own party, the National Unity Party (Partido de Unidad Nacional, PUN). The activities of other parties were limited, and, in July 1956, Villeda Morales and other PLH leaders were suddenly arrested and flown into exile. A few weeks later, the government crushed an uprising by 400 troops in the capital. Public opinion, however, was becoming increasingly hostile to the president, and rumors of his imminent fall had begun to circulate.

Following the August 1956 uprising, Lozano Díaz's health began to deteriorate, but he clung stubbornly to power. Elections for the legislature in October were boycotted by most of the opposition, who charged that the process was openly rigged to favor the president's supporters. The results seemed to confirm this charge, as the PUN candidates were declared the winners of all fifty-six seats in the congress. The joy of their victories was short, however. On October 21, the armed forces, led by the commanders of the army and air force academies and by Major Roberto Gálvez, the son of the former president, ousted Lozano Díaz and set up a military junta to rule the country.

This coup marked a turning point in Honduran history. For the first time, the armed forces had acted as an institution rather than as the instrument of a political party or of an individual leader. The new rulers represented younger, more nationalistic, and reform-minded elements in the military. They were products of the increased professionalization of the 1940s and 1950s. Most had received some training by United States military advisers, either in Honduras or abroad. For decades to come, the military would act as the final arbiter of Honduran politics.

The military's largest problem was the holding of elections for a legislature and the selection of a new president. A system of proportional representation was agreed upon, and elections were held in October. The PLH won a majority, and in November, by a vote of thirty-seven to twenty, the assembly selected Villeda Morales as president for a six-year term beginning January 1, 1958.

== Villeda Morales government, 1958–1963 ==
The new PLH administration undertook several major efforts to improve and modernize Honduran life. Funds were obtained from the International Monetary Fund to stabilize the currency and from the World Bank to begin paving a highway from the Caribbean coast to the capital. Other efforts were undertaken to expand education. The greatest attention was devoted to passing a new labor code, establishing a social security system, and beginning a program of agrarian reform.

The reform program produced increasing opposition among the more conservative elements in Honduran society. There were scattered uprisings during Villeda Morales's initial years in power, but the military remained loyal and quickly crushed the disturbances. Military support began to evaporate in the early 1960s, however. Waning military support was in part a result of rising criticism of the government by conservative organizations such as the National Federation of Agriculturists and Stockraisers of Honduras (Federación Nacional de Agricultores y Ganaderos de Honduras, Fenagh), which represented the large landowners.

The shift in the military's attitude also reflected concern over what were viewed as more frequent rural disorder and growing radical influences in labor and peasant groups. Deteriorating relations with neighboring states, notably Nicaragua, also contributed to the tension. The major causes of friction, however, were the president's 1957 creation of the Civil Guard (Guardia Civil)—a militarized police commanded directly by the president rather than the chief of the armed forces—and the prospect of another PLH victory in the 1963 elections.

The elections were scheduled for October 1963. As in 1954, the PLH was confronting a divided opposition. The PNH nominated Ramón Ernesto Cruz, but a faction split off and ran the son of ex-president Carías. The PLH ignored the wishes of their president and nominated Modesto Rodas Alvarado, a charismatic, highly partisan figure believed to be to the left of Villeda Morales. All signs pointed to an overwhelming victory for the PLH, an outcome that the military found increasingly unpalatable.

=== 1963 Honduran coup d'état ===
Rumors of a coup began circulating in late summer of 1963. The United States endeavored to make clear its opposition to such action—even dispatching a high-ranking officer from the United States Southern Command in the Panama Canal Zone to try to convince the chief of the armed forces, Air Force Colonel Oswaldo López Arellano, to call off the coup. Villeda Morales also tried to calm military fears, taking the carbines away from the Civil Guard and opposing plans for a constitutional amendment to restore direct command of the military to the president. All these efforts failed.

Before dawn on October 3, 1963, the military moved to seize power. The president and the PLH's 1963 presidential candidates were flown into exile, Congress was dissolved, the constitution was suspended, and the planned elections were canceled. Colonel López Arellano proclaimed himself president, and the United States promptly broke diplomatic relations.

== Military rule and international conflict, 1963–78 ==
=== 1963–1968 ===
López Arellano rapidly moved to consolidate his hold on power. Growing radical influence had been one of the reasons advanced to justify the coup. Once in power the government disbanded or otherwise attacked communist, pro-Castro, and other elements on the left. The Agrarian Reform Law was effectively nullified, in part by the regime's refusal to appropriate money for the National Agrarian Institute (Instituto Nacional Agrario, INA).

The country's two peasant unions were harassed, although a new organization of rural workers, the National Union of Peasants (Unión Nacional de Campesinos, UNC), which had Christian Democratic ties, actually expanded in the mid- and late-1960s. López Arellano promised to call elections for yet another legislature, and early in 1964 his government was recognized by the new United States administration of President Lyndon B. Johnson. Shortly thereafter, military assistance, which had been suspended following the coup, was resumed.

Close ties soon developed between the military government and the PNH. A key factor in the development of these links was PNH leader Ricardo Zúñiga Augustinius, who became secretary of state for the presidency, the key cabinet position. Numerous other party members served in the government, giving it a civil-military character but widening the gap between the administration and the PLH. Also linked to the government was a secret organization used to attack the left and intimidate political opponents. Known as the Mancha Brava (Tough Spot), it reputedly drew much of its membership from the ranks of public employees.

To give a semblance of legality to his government, López Arellano promulgated a new constitution with a unicameral Congress. He then called elections for this new Congress. A general amnesty for political figures was decreed in November, exiles were allowed to return, and the PLH resumed political activity. The PNH had pledged throughout the campaign that if it gained control of the Congress, its members would select López Arellano as president. The vote was held on February 16, 1965; the PNH won 35 seats, the PLH 29. The PLH charged the government with fraudulently manipulating the results, and some party leaders urged their supporters to boycott meetings of the assembly. The PLH was unable to agree on this tactic, and enough PLH members took their seats when the Congress convened on March 15 to provide the necessary quorum. The PNH delegates kept their promise and elected López Arellano as president for a new six-year term, from 1965 to 1971.

For a time, López Arellano had success in foreign affairs. One of his government's first acts had been to join with Guatemala and Nicaragua in establishing the Central American Defense Council (Consejo de Defensa Centroamericana, Condeca), which was a military pact among these Central American states and the United States for coordination of counterinsurgency activities. El Salvador joined shortly thereafter, and in 1965 Condeca held its first joint military exercise on the Caribbean coast of Honduras. That same year, Honduras contributed a small contingent of troops to the Organization of American States (OAS) forces monitoring the election in the Dominican Republic.

As the 1960s progressed, Honduras's relations with Nicaragua and with the United States improved, but increasing problems developed between Honduras and El Salvador. In May and June 1967, a series of incidents along the border aggravated tensions considerably. One incident involved the capture of two Salvadoran officers and thirty-nine enlisted men whose truck convoy had penetrated several kilometers into Honduras. The Salvadoran troops were finally returned over a year later, but the tensions continued to mount.

=== War with El Salvador (1969) ===
By 1968, the López Arellano regime seemed to be in serious trouble. The economic situation was producing growing labor conflicts, political unrest, and even criticism from conservative groups such as Fenagh. Municipal elections were held in March 1968 to the accompaniment of violence and charges of open fraud, producing PNH victories but also fueling public discontent and raising the concern of the United States Embassy. Efforts at opening up a dialogue were made in mid-1968 but had little success. Later in the year a general strike was kept brief by government action that helped break the strike and exiled the leader of the major Caribbean coast labor federation. Unrest continued, however; in the spring of 1969 new strikes broke out among teachers and other groups.

As the political situation deteriorated, the Honduran government and some private groups came increasingly to place blame for the nation's economic problems on the approximately 300,000 undocumented Salvadoran immigrants in Honduras. Fenagh began to associate Salvadoran immigrants with illegal land invasions, and in January 1969, the Honduran government refused to renew the 1967 Bilateral Treaty on Immigration with El Salvador that had been designed to regulate the flow of individuals across their common border. In April INA announced that it would begin to expel from their lands those who had acquired property under agrarian reform without fulfilling the legal requirement that they be Honduran by birth. Attacks were also launched in the media on the impact of Salvadoran immigrant labor on unemployment and wages on the Caribbean coast. By late May, Salvadorans began to stream out of Honduras back to an overpopulated El Salvador.

Tensions continued to mount during June 1969. The soccer teams of the two nations were engaged that month in a three-game elimination match as a preliminary to the World Cup. Disturbances broke out during the first game in Tegucigalpa, but the situation got considerably worse during the second match in San Salvador. Honduran fans were roughed up, the Honduran flag and national anthem were insulted, and the emotions of both nations became considerably agitated. Actions against Salvadoran residents in Honduras, including several vice consuls, became increasingly violent. An unknown number of Salvadorans were killed or brutalized, and tens of thousands began fleeing the country. The press of both nations contributed to a growing climate of near- hysteria, and on June 27, 1969, Honduras broke diplomatic relations with El Salvador.

The Mancha Brava, during the war with El Salvador had other purposes besides intimidating political party's. With the membership of Honduran civilians it was used against Salvadorian residents and temporary workers to exterminate any Salvadorian presence. Methods used against the Salvadorians was being hanged, castrated, removal of females breast and genital and burned alived during the early days of the war.

Early on the morning of July 14, 1969, concerted military action began in what came to be known as the Soccer War. The Salvadoran Air Force attacked targets inside Honduras and the Salvadoran Army launched major offensives along the main road connecting the two nations and against the Honduran islands in the Golfo de Fonseca. At first, the Salvadorans made fairly rapid progress. By the evening of July 15, the Salvadoran army, which was considerably larger and better equipped than its Honduran opponent, pushed the Hondurans back over eight kilometers and captured the departmental capital of Nueva Ocotepeque. Thereafter, the attack bogged down, and the Salvadorans began to experience fuel and ammunition shortages. A major reason for the fuel shortage was the action of the Honduran Air Force, which—in addition to largely destroying the smaller Salvadoran air force—had severely damaged El Salvador's oil storage facilities.

The day after the fighting had begun, the OAS met in an urgent session and called for an immediate cease-fire and a withdrawal of El Salvador's forces from Honduras. El Salvador resisted the pressures from the OAS for several days, demanding that Honduras first agree to pay reparations for the attacks on Salvadoran citizens and guarantee the safety of those Salvadorans remaining in Honduras. A cease-fire was arranged on the night of July 18; it took full effect only on July 20. El Salvador continued until July 29 to resist pressures to withdraw its troops. Then a combination of pressures led El Salvador to agree to a withdrawal in the first days of August. Those persuasive pressures included the possibility of OAS economic sanctions against El Salvador and the dispatch of OAS observers to Honduras to oversee the security of Salvadorans remaining in that country. The actual war had lasted just over four days, but it would take more than a decade to arrive at a final peace settlement.

The war produced only losses for both sides. Between 60,000 and 130,000 Salvadorans had been forcibly expelled or had fled from Honduras, producing serious economic disruption in some areas. Trade between the two nations had been totally disrupted and the border closed, damaging the economies of both nations and threatening the future of the Central American Common Market (CACM). Up to 2,000 people, the majority Honduran civilians, had been killed, and thousands of other Hondurans in the border area had been made homeless. Airline service between the two nations was also disrupted for over a decade.

=== Post-war (1969-1972) ===
After the war, public support for the military plummeted. Although the air force had performed well the army had not. Criticism of the army was not limited to the public; junior officers were often vocal in their criticism of superiors, and a rift developed between junior and senior officers.

The war, however, led to a new sense of Honduran nationalism and national pride. Tens of thousands of Honduran workers and peasants had gone to the government to beg for arms to defend their nation. Local defense committees had sprung up, with thousands of ordinary citizens, often armed only with machetes, taking over local security duties. This response to the fighting made a strong impression on a sector of the officer corps and contributed to an increased concern over national development and social welfare among the armed forces.

The main key figure in the Salvadorian military victory was General Jose Alberto "Chele" Medrano. In charged and being main head of the National Guard (GN) he was the first to lead the wave of guards into Honduras. In order to infiltrate the Honduran government and reach the Honduran president Osvaldo Lopex Arellano, General Jose Alberto "Chele" Medrano disguised himself as a priest in order to have the Honduran president Confess with him. Disguised as a member of the Catholic Church with orders to go to the president himself he was able to gather information straight from the president himself, as the president confessed his intentions, struggles and fears to General Medrano. Once the information was gathered he returned to El Salvador with first hand information about the conflict, with those plans he was able to move quickly and where to move. Eventually He was the hero to the Salvadorian Military community and Salvadorian people.

The internal political struggle had been briefly suspended during the conflict with El Salvador, but by the start of 1970 it was again in full swing. The government was under pressure to initiate administrative and electoral reforms, allow open elections in 1971, reorganize the military, and adopt new economic programs, including a revision of Honduran relations with the CACM. Labor, peasant, and business organizations were meeting together in what were known as the fuerzas vivas (living forces). Their representatives met with López Arellano and proposed a Plan of National Unity, calling for free elections, a coalition cabinet, and a division of government posts and congressional seats. These proposals failed to elicit immediate response, but discussions continued. Meanwhile, a general political amnesty was decreed, the creation of the Honduran Christian Democratic Party (Partido Demócrata Cristiano de Honduras, PDCH) was announced, and a decree was issued calling for presidential and congressional elections on March 28, 1971.

After considerable discussion and debate the PHL and PNH parties responded to pressures from labor, business and the military. On January 7, 1971, they signed a political pact agreeing to establish a national-unity government after the March elections. The purposes of the pact were twofold. The first was to present a single slate of congressional candidates that would divide the Congress equally between the PLH and PNH (each party would run its own candidate for the presidency).

The second goal was to promote the Minimum Government Plan (Plan Mínimo de Gobierno), which included achieving agrarian reform, increasing technical education, passing a civil service law, attempting to resolve the conflict with El Salvador, restructuring the CACM, and reforming government administration. A later agreement between the parties—the "little pact" (pactito)—agreed to a division of government posts, including those in the Supreme Court of Justice.

The 1971 elections were relatively free and honest. Both parties offered presidential candidates who were compromise choices of the major party factions. The PLH ran Jorge Bueso Arias, and the PNH nominated Ramón Ernesto Cruz. Most observers anticipated a PLH victory, but the PNH ran a more aggressive campaign, making use of the mass media and of modern campaign techniques for the first time in Honduran history. On election day, Cruz scored an impressive victory, gaining 299,807 votes to 269,989 for Bueso Arias. However, a disturbing note for the PNH was that popular participation in the election had declined significantly from 1965. Only slightly over two-thirds of those registered to vote had done so, although the constitution made voting obligatory.

At first, Cruz appeared to be living up to the terms of the agreements between the parties. He appointed five PLH members, five PNH members, and one military officer to his cabinet. López Arellano remained as chief of the armed forces. As time passed, however, the split between PLH and PNH widened steadily. In order to deal with the budget crisis, Cruz pushed through a reluctant Congress a bill that cut tax benefits and import exemptions. This bill produced opposition from both business and labor sectors. In the area of agrarian reform, the president soon removed INA's dynamic director, Roberto Sandoval, and replaced him with a PNH member, Horacio Moya Posas, who slowed the pace of reform. The PLH protested this action and also argued that the appointment of PNH supporters to the Supreme Court of Justice violated the agreement. Finally, in March 1972, the president dismissed two of the PLH cabinet members. By mid-1972, the government had lost most of its non-PNH support.

=== Military rule and reform (1972-1978) ===
During the autumn of 1972, with the support of the military, the two parties attempted to revise the arrangements between the parties and the major labor and business groups. These efforts were not unsuccessful, and opposition to what was increasingly perceived as an ineffectual and divisive administration spread steadily. The virtual halting of agrarian reform and the killing of several peasants by the military in the department of Olancho had angered peasant groups. Labor and business were alienated by the ineffective efforts to deal with the problems of the economy.

The PLH felt that its position within the government was steadily eroding and that its agreement with the PNH was regularly violated. In December peasant and labor organizations announced a hunger march by 20,000 individuals to Tegucigalpa to protest the government's agrarian policies. Supported by a prior agreement with the labor movement, the military on December 4, 1972, overthrew Cruz in a bloodless coup and once again installed López Arellano as the president.

Problems for the López Arellano regime began to increase in 1974. The economy was still growing at a slow pace, partly because of the immense damage caused to the Caribbean coast by Hurricane Fifi in September 1974. The storm was the most devastating natural disaster in recent Honduran history, claiming 10,000 or more lives and destroying a vast number of banana plants. The disaster also increased calls for agrarian reform.

The government's greatest problem, however, centered on another aspect of the banana industry. Honduras had joined other banana-exporting nations in a joint agreement to levy an export tax on that fruit. The Honduran tax had taken effect in April 1974 but was suddenly canceled four months later. Shortly thereafter, reports began to circulate that the United Fruit Company had paid more than US$1 million to Honduran officials to secure the repeal of the tax. Prominently implicated in these accusations were López Arellano and his minister of economy and commerce.

Reacting to these charges on March 31, 1975, the military relieved López Arellano of his position as chief of the armed forces, replacing him with Colonel Juan Alberto Melgar Castro. Just over three weeks later, they completed the process by removing López Arellano from the presidency and replacing him with Melgar Castro. These decisions had been made by the increasingly powerful Supreme Council of the Armed Forces (Consejo Superior de las Fuerzas Armadas, Consuffaa), a group of approximately twenty to twenty-five key colonels of the armed forces who provided the institution with a form of collective leadership.

In July 1976, the border with El Salvador was still disputed. In July, a minor upsurge of conflict there brought prompt OAS intervention, which helped to keep the conflict from escalating. In October, both nations agreed to submit their dispute to arbitration. This development raised hopes for a rapid peace settlement. Progress, however, proved slow; and tensions were raised again, briefly, in 1978, when the Honduran government abruptly canceled all permits for travel to El Salvador. The rise of guerrilla conflict in El Salvador, plus strong pressures from other nations, made a settlement increasingly urgent in subsequent months. In October 1980, with Peruvian mediation, the bilateral General Peace Treaty was finally signed in Lima, Peru. Trade and travel were soon resumed, but numerous problems, including final adjudication of some small parcels of territory along the frontier, remained for later consideration.

Relations with Nicaragua had also become more difficult, especially after civil conflict had increased in that nation in the late 1970s. In March 1978, Honduran soldiers captured Germán Pomares, a leader of the Sandinista National Liberation Front (Frente Sandinista de Liberación Nacional, FSLN), the guerrilla force fighting against the regime of Anastasio Somoza Debayle in Nicaragua. Pomares was held until the end of June, but Nicaraguan requests for extradition were denied, and he was ultimately flown to Panama. As fighting in Nicaragua escalated in 1978 and early 1979, Honduras found itself in a difficult position. Honduras did not want to support the unpopular Somoza regime but feared the Marxist leanings of the FSLN. In addition, beginning in September 1978, Honduras had become burdened with an ever-growing number of refugees from Nicaragua.

== Return to civilian rule, 1978–82 ==
1978 Honduran coup d'état
Date	7 August 1978
Location	Honduras
Status	Juan Alberto Melgar Castro steps down as president

Belligerents
(Honduras) Honduran government	(Honduras) Honduran Armed Forces

Commanders and leaders
(Honduras) Juan Alberto Melgar Castro	(Honduras) Policarpo Paz García

Melgar Castro's hold on power began to dissolve in 1978. Charges of government corruption and of military links with narcotics traffic had become increasingly widespread, leading to accusations that the government had failed to adequately defend the country. Melgar's hold on power had weakened because he lacked support among large landowners. In addition, the Melgar government had seemed to be making little progress toward promised elections, leading to suspicions that it hoped to prolong its time in office.

Right-wing political forces criticized the Melgar administration's handling of the Ferrari Case, which involved drug trafficking and murder of civilians and in which members of the military had been implicated. Unions and student organizations correctly interpreted the right wing's criticism as a prelude to a coup. When demonstrators took to the streets to support Melgar, right-wing elements within the military charged Melgar had lost control of public order and ousted him.

On August 7, 1978, Melgar Castro and his cabinet were replaced by a three-member junta. Led by General Policarpo Paz García, chief of the armed forces, and including the air force commander and the chief of military security, the junta had close ties to the large landowners and moved to protect the military men involved in the Ferrari Case.

From its inception, the government of Paz García had promised to return Honduras to civilian rule. In April 1980, the Honduran citizenry was summoned to the polls to choose delegates for a new Congress. The Congress would select an interim government and would establish procedures for presidential and congressional elections in 1981.

Early indications for the 1980 elections pointed toward a victory for the PNH, headed by Ricardo Zúñiga. The PNH appeared more unified and organized than the rival PLH, and most people assumed that the PNH would be favored by the ruling military. The PLH suffered from internal divisions and a lack of leadership. Former president Villeda Morales had died in 1971, and the party's leader after his death, Modesto Rodas Alvarado, had died in 1979.

A split had developed between the more conservative followers of Rodas and the party's left wing, which had formed the Popular Liberal Alliance (Alianza Liberal del Pueblo, Alipo). In addition, a third party, the Innovation and Unity Party (Partido de Inovación y Unidad, Pinu) had been registered and was expected to draw support away from the PLH. The PNH had succeeded in blocking the inscription of the PDCH, leading the PDCH adherents to join with groups further to the left in denouncing the elections as a farce and a fraud and urging popular abstention.

The April 1980 election produced a record registration and voter turnout. More than 1.2 million Hondurans registered, and over 1 million voted—over 81 percent of those eligible. The high number of voters evidently favored the PLH, which won 49.4 percent of the votes cast. Under a complex apportionment system, the PLH won thirty-five seats in the Congress; the PNH, thirty-three; and Pinu, three. This result produced considerable debate over the composition of the next government.

There was general agreement on naming Paz García as interim president, and the disputes centered on the composition of the cabinet. Ultimately, a PLH leader, Roberto Suazo Córdova, was made president of the Congress, while the PLH also gained five of the seats on the new Supreme Court of Justice. The cabinet was divided among all three parties and the military; the armed forces received the Ministry of National Defense and Public Security, as well as the Ministry of Foreign Affairs, and the PNH acquired key economic positions.

The Congress took more than a year to draft a new constitution and an electoral law for the 1981 presidential and congressional elections. The work went slowly, and the elections originally scheduled for August 1981 had to be postponed until November. In the interim, the National Elections Tribunal (Tribunal Nacional de Elecciones, TNE) unanimously granted the PDCH the legal status needed for a place on the 1981 ballot.

Despite the presence of candidates for the Pinu and the PDCH on the November 1981 ballot, it was clear that the election would be essentially a two-party affair between the PLH and PNH. On November 29, 1981, a total of 1,214,735 Hondurans, 80.7 percent of those registered, voted, giving the PLH a sweeping victory. Suazo Córdova won 636,392 votes (52.4 percent), the PNH 491,089 votes, and 48,582 votes were divided between the Pinu and the PDCH. The PLH also took control of Congress, winning forty-four seats; the PNH, thirty-four; the Pinu, three; and the PDCH, one. The PLH also won 61 percent of the municipal councils. Suazo Córdova was inaugurated as president of Honduras in January 1982, ending nearly a decade of military presidents.

== See also ==
- Honduras in World War II
