= Honduran Red Cross =

Humanitarian organization in Honduras

- Cruz Roja Hondureña
- Formation: 1924
- Type: Non-profit

The Honduran Red Cross (Spanish: Cruz Roja Hondureña) is a non-profit social and voluntary organization that provides help for at-risk populations and those affected by disasters. It is part of the International Red Cross and Red Crescent Movement.

== Founding and history ==
The Honduran Red Cross was created in 1924 during the Second Civil War. During the conflict, a group of people organized to tend to those who had been injured by rebels in Tegucigalpa, following the example set by Henry Dunant during the First World War. This group of volunteers, which included Carlos Rivas, Delia Becerra, Emma Bonilla, Ernesto López Alleys, Hernán López Alleys, Isolina Guilbert, Luz Becerra, Marine Stair, Marieta Guilbert, Otilia Idiáquez, Roberto Rivas, and Soledad Lozano, among others, became the first to carry the symbol of the Red Cross in Honduras, albeit without a clear leader. Later, in 1932, Tiburcio Carias Andino created a national aid committee, designating civil engineer Abraham Williams Calderón as its president. Williams Caldéron, along with Dr. Enrique Douglas Guilbert, an active member of Rotary International, decided to devise the founding of the Red Cross in Honduras. Thus, on August 22, 1934, the first board of directors was elected in a Honduran casino, which was as follows:

- President Manuel Larios Córdover, president of the Honduran Medical Association.
- First Vice President Nicolás Cornelsen.
- Second Vice President Abraham Williams Calderón, civil engineer and general.
- Vice President of the Republic and Minister of Governing, Justice, Health, and Welfare, Dr. Francisco Sánchez Urbina.
- Secretary Ricardo Diego Alduvin, director of the hospital and dean of the faculty of medicine.
- Treasurer Donato Diaz Medina, leader of the bank of Honduras.
- Salvador Paredes.

In 1937, a group of women organized and sponsored the first group of Honduran aid workers; however, they were not yet defined as the Honduran Red Cross. Focused on their requests to the government to obtain legal status, they developed activities to benefit the Honduran society. On September 24 of the same year, the president, doctor, and general Tiburcio Carias Andino, in a meeting at the Presidential House of Honduras, granted a well deserved legal recognition to the group, organizing a board of directors. Original members included Adolfina Mejía, Berta García de Saenz Rico, Elia Pineda de Fortín, Ernestina de Landa, Enriqueta Girón de Lázarus, Dr. Guillermo Durón, Dr. Hernán López Alleys, lawyer Héctor Pineda Ugarte, Dr. Humberto Díaz Banegas, Isabel Siqueiros de Pinel, Isolina Lozano de Guilbert, Josefina Mejía, lawyer Jorge Fidel Durón, Dr. Juan A. Mejía, Dr. Manuel Cáceres Vijil, Dr. and future president Ramón Villeda Moral, and lawyer Rubén Álvarez Channels. By means of Decree No. 475 issued on October 6, 1937, the institution was known officially as the Honduran Red Cross, with the intended function of engaging in humanitarian action in the national territory. In 1941, Lázarus Henrietta, serving as president of the Honduran Red Cross, requested the National Congress of Honduras to issue a law establishing income for the organization. It was issued as the "law of the income of the seal of the Red Cross" so that the organization would receive finances in order to sustain themselves independently and continue providing social services. The economic funds received by the organization would help the organization to sustain itself independently and continue providing social services. In October 1937, the original group of volunteers from 1924 were recognized for the first time.

In 1942, the first units were established in San Pedro Sula, Puerto Cortés, Tela, and La Ceiba. These units were authorized to retain 40% of donations collected by donors and benefactors and sending the other 60% to the central committee. In the same year, the Infant Consul was founded, with the goal of providing help and support to Honduran children.

In 1950, the organization received its first ambulance, a Ford model.

In 1954, the then-president of Honduras, Dr. Juan Manuel Gálvez, donated land for the construction of the official headquarters.

In 1978, the official statutes of the Honduran Red Cross were published.

The Honduran Red Cross has had a major impact on several Honduran events, such as the third civil war of 1931, the events of 1954, the Football War of 1969. Together with ACNUR and Doctors without Borders, they have backed the mobilization of civilians in the border zones with El Salvador and Nicaragua, as in the natural disasters caused by the Hurricane Fifi of 1971 and Hurricane Mitch, which devastated the north and central zones of the Central American country in 1998.

== Presidents ==
Presidents of the Central Committee of the Honduran Red Cross:

- Enriqueta Girón de Lázarus.
- Cleto Ramón Alvarez.
- Meneca Of Mencía
- José Juan Castro (current)

=== Paramedics ===
The body of paramedics, staffed by volunteers, receives a basic course in first aid, basic emergency aid, building rescue, mountains aid, rivers aid, etc. They also receive intensive training in infant nursing, in addition to cardiovascular and pulmonary resuscitation, minor surgeries, and dealing with infections.

=== Regional headquarters ===
The central headquarters of the Honduran Red Cross is in the Concepción neighborhood, 7th street, 1st and 2nd avenue, of Tegucigalpa, M.D.C.

The expansion of the regional headquarters led to the expansion of the Red Cross into many major Honduran cities, such as Comayagua, Danlí, The Ceiba, Choluteca, Santa Bárbara, Juticalpa, San Pedro Sula, Santa Rosa de Copán, and Yuscarán.

== Red Cross Youth Honduras ==
Red Cross Youth Honduras is an auxiliary program of Honduran Red Cross founded on 17 June 1964. It is composed of volunteers aged 6 and up, organized as follows: 6 -12 year olds are brigaders; 12–30 year olds are juveniles; 30+ year olds are advisors.

Offices of the CRJH (Cruz Roja Juventud Honduras) are in Francisco Morazán, Comayagua, Choluteca, Valley, Olancho, El Paraiso, Cortes, Santa Bárbara, Atlántida, Colón, Intibucá, Yoro and Copán.

== See also ==
- List of Red Cross and Red Crescent Societies
- International committee de la Cruz Red

== Bibliography ==
- Durón, Jorge Fidel. Development and activities de la Cruz Red Honduran. Printing Calderón, Tegucigalpa, Honduras, 1943.
- Statutes and Regulations de la Cruz Red Honduran, Workshops Tipográficos National, Tegucigalpa, Honduras, 1937.
