= Honduran coup d'état =

Honduran coup d'état may refer to:

- 1827 Honduran coup d'état
- 1904 Honduran coup d'état
- 1956 Honduran coup d'état
- 1963 Honduran coup d'état
- 1972 Honduran coup d'état
- 1975 Honduran coup d'état
- 1978 Honduran coup d'état
- 2009 Honduran coup d'état
