= 1963 Honduran coup d'état =

Military coup against Ramón Villeda Morales

Date	3 October 1963
Location	Tegucigalpa, Honduras
Result	Coup successful

Belligerents
Armed Forces of Honduras	Honduras

Commanders and leaders
Oswaldo López Arellano	Ramón Villeda Morales

Units involved
	Civil Guard

Casualties and losses
Unknown	Scores of civil guardsmen and students dead

A coup d'état took place in Honduras on 3 October 1963, ten days before a scheduled election. Oswaldo López Arellano replaced Ramón Villeda Morales as president and initiated two decades of military rule.

Villeda Morales had instituted progressive labor laws and an agrarian reform policy, which prompted accusations of Communist sympathies from the right wing in Honduras and the United States. His intention to expropriate land from United Fruit Company, though never carried out, was a particular source of friction.

Civil–military relations in Honduras had deteriorated since 1957. A coup attempt in 1959, suppressed by students and unionist supporters of Villeda Morales, provoked intense hostility towards the military, as well as the creation of an autonomous presidential guard. Politicians discussed abolishing the military. Modesto Rodas Alvarado, the Liberal Party's candidate for president, ran on a demilitarization platform and was expected to win the election on 13 October 1963. The military acted pre-emptively and seized control of the government.

== Background ==
For much of the 20th century, the economy of Honduras was largely controlled by the United Fruit Company. Beginning with a successful general strike in 1954, workers pushed for better pay, shorter hours, job benefits, unionization, and land reform.

Ramón Villeda Morales, a reformist physician with the Liberal Party of Honduras (Partido Liberal de Honduras, PLH) won a plurality of votes in the 1954 presidential election, but fell 8,869 votes short of a majority and was blocked from becoming president. Vice President Julio Lozano Díaz attempted to seize power, dissolving the legislature and declaring himself interim president. On 7 October 1956, Lozano Díaz held a Congressional election which both of the country's major parties declared unfair and boycotted. This election (in which Díaz's party won every seat) provoked a military takeover on 21 October. In a new election held on 22 September 1957, the PLH won a majority of seats. The new Congress appointed Villeda Morales as President for a six-year term.

== Villeda Morales presidency, 1957–1963 ==
Villeda Morales introduced wide-ranging progressive platform, including infrastructure development, school construction, labor regulations, and agrarian reform. His policies generally won him praise from the Kennedy administration, but animosity from anticommunist hardliners (i.e. landowners and business executives) in Honduras and in the United States.

=== Agrarian reform ===
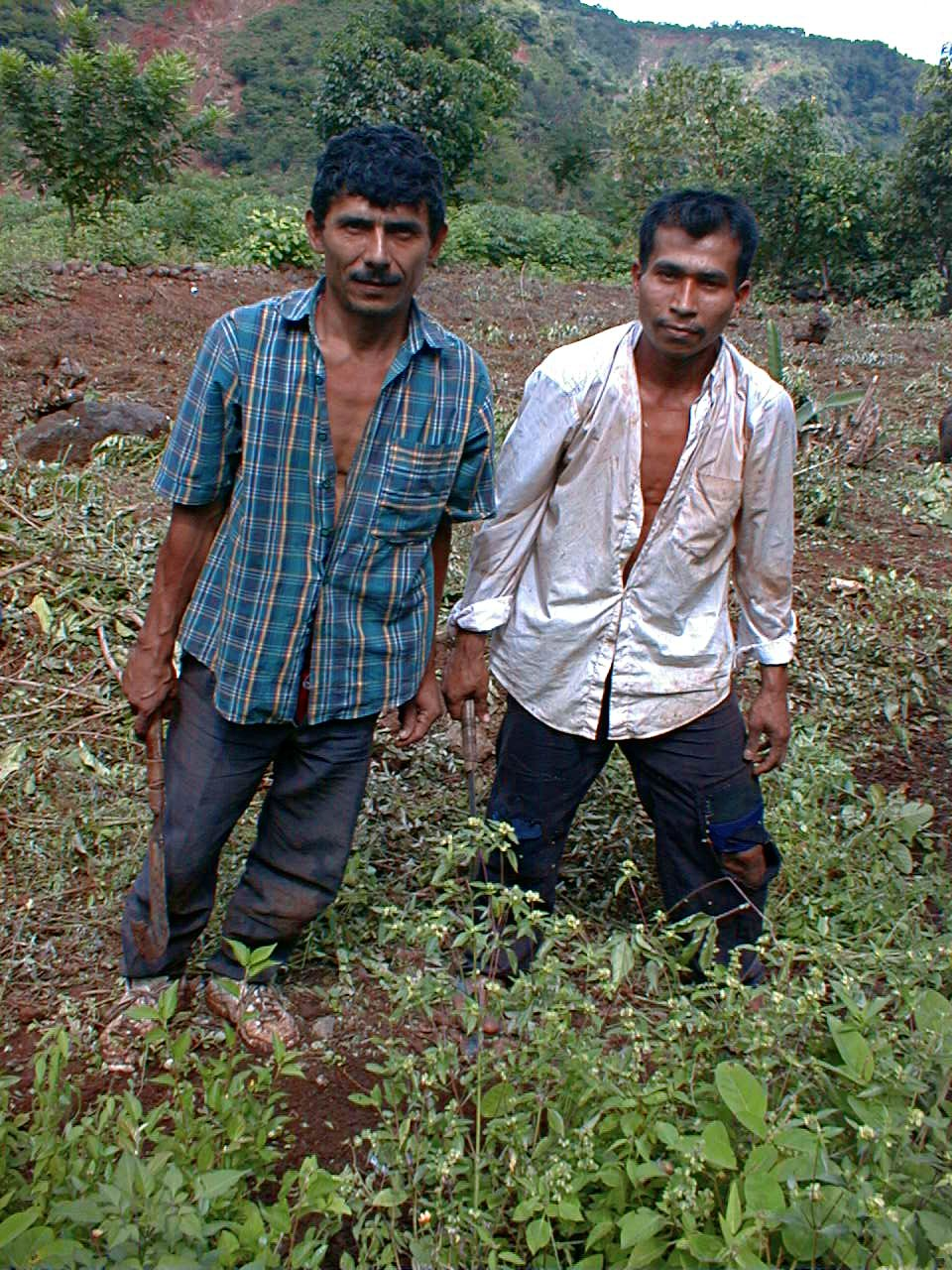
Honduran farmers

Tension over land in Honduras was rising, as increasing production of bananas, cotton, cattle, and coffee drove many people off their land. Haciendas used barbed wire to enclose more and more land, provoking violent conflict with peasants. The Villeda Morales government sought to quell this violence with moderate reforms, including the distribution of national land and the creation of a national peasant organization.

Under Villeda Morales, Honduras joined the Alliance for Progress initiated by the United States under John F. Kennedy. Enthusiastic about liberalization, Villeda promoted a land reform law to defuse the anger of peasants, restore illegally occupied land, and increase the amount of land under cultivation. The law would have expropriated uncultivated lands owned by U.S. Companies, including the United Fruit Company and the Standard Fruit Company.

Villeda Morales resisted pressure from Ambassador Charles F. Burrows to prioritize the interests of U.S. companies. His actions were not well-received by business interests in the United States. United Fruit president Thomas Sunderland wrote to Secretary of State Martin:

The events of today indicate that the situation in Honduras is growing more serious with the passing of time. In spite of the affirmations made by President Villeda Morales in the presence of the American Ambassador that a copy of the proposed law would be shown to us today, Honduran government officials have declined to show us the bill. ... We urgently need action by the State Department through the American Ambassador with the goal of obtaining a copy of this proposal before it is too late to take action to defend American interests.

The U.S. Senate threatened to withhold aid from Honduras if it expropriated possessions of a U.S. company. The Kennedy Administration pressured Villeda Morales directly, and after a visit to the White House in 1962 he made significant policy changes to undercut the power of the land reform law. By October 1962, U.S. Assistant Secretary of State Edwin M. Martin announced that Honduras had agreed to protect the banana companies interests—but United Fruit was unconvinced, insisting that with its new agrarian reform law, Honduras was travelling "on the path of Cuba and Communist China."

=== Politics of anticommunism ===
To prove his anticommunist credentials, Villeda Morales routinely denounced Communism and cut diplomatic relations with Cuba in 1961. Many U.S. officials, however, warned that the liberal Villeda Morales government was not sufficiently hardline on Communism.

A Helluva Situation

"We have a helluva situation down here and unless really forceful action is taken we are going to have a little Commie Chine [sic] right in our own backyard."

— Whitting Willauer, U.S. Ambassador to Honduras.

The Federal Bureau of Investigation sought to identify Communists within the Liberal Party. The Central Intelligence Agency worked actively in Honduras to alienate the country from revolutionary Cuba. When Villeda Morales cut ties with Cuba, one week after the Bay of Pigs invasion, it was probably at the urging of U.S. agents in Honduras.

As in other Latin American countries, the United States had cultivated a relationship with the Honduran military. A 1954 agreement between the two countries promised military aid from the U.S. in exchange for resource extraction rights. The military sent representatives to meetings of the U.S.-orchestrated Central American War Ministers group, which became CONDECA (Consejo de Defensa Centroamericana). During the Villeda Morales presidency, the Honduran military had greater allegiance to the U.S. than to the Liberal Party government—thereby exerting constant pressure on the government to follow U.S. policy mandates.

== Tensions between military and civilian government ==
Tension between the civilian government and the military began after the election, when it seems that military officers coerced Villeda Morales and the PLH to adopt a new Constitution. The Constitution of 1957 envisioned a political role for the Honduran military, stipulated that the military could operate from a secret budget, and allowed the military to disobey "orders that violate the spirit or letter of the Constitution". The military used its newly expansive powers, demanding changes in the civilian government and abusing Honduran citizens with impunity. PLH leader Francisco Milla Bermúdez argued that Honduras should abolish its military completely, as Costa Rica had done. Resentment against the military was rising, and Milla Bermúdez's proposal received unexpected popular support.

=== 1959 coup attempt ===
On 12 July 1959, a coup led by Colonel Armando Velásquez Cerrato killed numerous people in an attempt to gain power. This attempt was supported by the National Police and by the powerful Somoza forces of Nicaragua, but did not have complete support from within the military. This coup was defeated when students and unionists came to the government's defense. The head of the armed forces interceded, allowed Velásquez Cerrato to escape, and declared a return to the status quo.

The attempted coup provoked further alarm about the power of the military, and led to active civilian efforts to restrict its power. Public opinion turned further against the military, and demilitarization was discussed as a viable political option. Ildefonso Orellana Bueno argued, in a speech to the Constituent Assembly (and republished in El Cronista), for a reform of the 1957 Constitution:

The group of individuals clustered with the pompous name of 'Armed Forces' wants to convert themselves into a privileged and all-embracing caste, shielding itself to reach its goals in Title XIII of our fundamental law, from whose trench they are preparing to stab the back of the Honduran people, having now been converted not only in the devouring octopus of the national budget, but also in a real social threat, in an imminent danger for our own security, and in an enemy of the functioning democracy in which we have dedicated our faith.

President Villeda organized a militarized Civil Guard (Guardia Civil), which reported to the President and sometimes fought openly with the military. After the Civil Guard defeated the Army in a March 1961 soccer game, soldiers killed 9 members of the Civil Guard. In September 1961, the Civil Guard killed 11 soldiers and civilians who were attempting another coup against Villeda.

=== 1963 election campaign ===
Villeda himself had lost support within the Liberal Party, due to his concessions to the National Party, the military, and the United States. Modesto Rodas Alvarado became a leader of the Liberal Party opposition to Villeda, and won the party's nomination for the election scheduled for 13 October 1963. Rodas Alvarado won substantial popular support based on campaign promises to abolish the military.

Colonel Oswaldo López Arellano was offered the nomination of the National Party (Partido Nacional de Honduras, PNH) by the influential General and former President Tiburcio Carías Andino. He turned it down, citing "reasons beyond my control". This cryptic response led to charges among the National Party (and the press) that the U.S. had pressured López Arellano not to participate in the election, because of Kennedy's opposition to military governments. The eventual nominee of the National Party, Ramón Ernesto Cruz, had served past dictatorships and was not popular with farmers, organized labor, or liberals in San Pedro Sula. Ernesto Cruz's chances were weakened further when General Carías Andino formed a splinter party (the Popular Progressive Party).

Rumors in the middle of the year suggested the possibility of a coup. The U.S. was also aware of this possibility. Kennedy himself opposed a coup, threatening to cut off economic aid to a military junta. This threat was disregarded by conservatives in the military, who expressed confidence (according to Burrows) that the U.S. "would be back in six months".

== Coup ==
On 3 October 1963, the military conducted a violent coup, beginning with an attack on sleeping Civil Guardsmen. More civilian resistors and Civil Guardsmen were killed in the following days.

Colonel López Arellano was proclaimed President and issued a declaration which described problematic elements of the former regime:

1. The existence of a Guardia Civil, converted into a political army, duly armed and in open opposition to the Army, with its only goal to achieve the elimination of [the Army] in order to proceed afterward to submit the citizenry in general to the capricious sectarian desires of its leaders.
2. The evidence that the Government of the Republic favored the goals of the [Guardia Civil], helping it achieve those goals materially and morally. ...
3. The infiltration and freedom of action of extreme leftist elements, who in frank and open contrivance with government functionaries had undertaken a campaign of discrediting the Armed Forces as an initial step in implanting a climate of unrest that permits the rise of totalitarianism.
4. The violation of the principles of free election, through the adulteration of electoral censuses and interference ... [and the passage] of an unconstitutional election law (Gobierno Militar de Honduras 1963: 8–9).

Villeda Morales and Rodas Alvarado were immediately deported to Costa Rica.

== Responses ==
The government of San Pedro Sula, led by Mayor Felipe Zelaya Zelaya of the Liberal Party convened on 5 October to determine a response. They decided to remain in office, within the state of Honduras, if the Arellano regime agreed to respect the autonomy of the municipal government.

The Voice of America quoted Ambassador Burrows stating that the "military golpe was justified due to the Communist infiltration into the government of Ramón Villeda Morales". The statement was denied by the United States Information Agency on the following day.

Kennedy publicly condemned the coup after it took place, calling it "self-defeating" because "dictatorships are the seedbeds from which communism ultimately springs up". The coup seemed to counteract the values espoused by the young Alliance for Progress. On Kennedy's orders, the U.S. ended diplomatic relations with the Honduras government. Kennedy was assassinated on 22 November 1963. The new U.S. President, Lyndon B. Johnson, recognized the military government on 14 December 1964.

== Aftermath ==
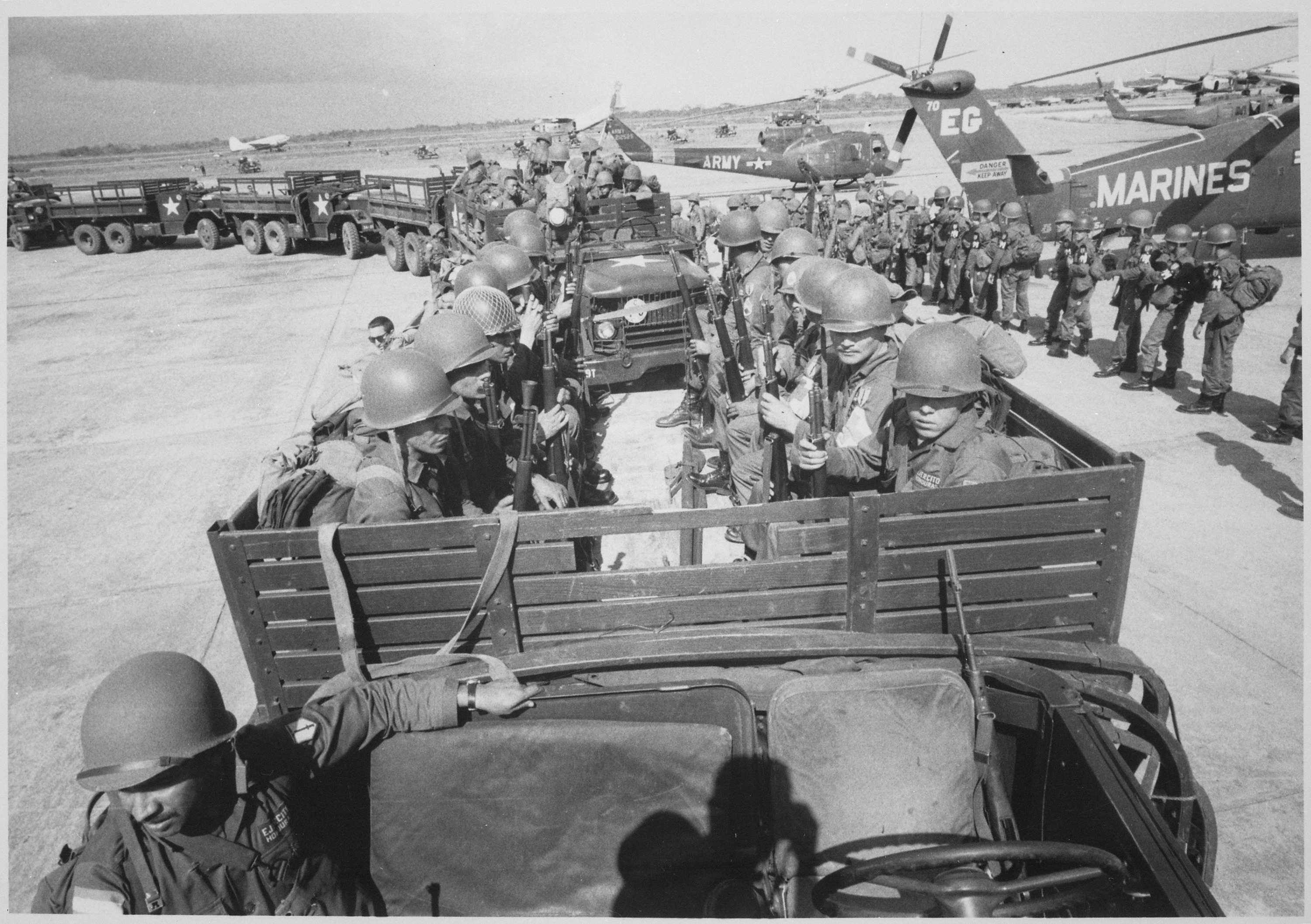
Honduran soldiers collaborate with the U.S. occupation of the Dominican Republic, 1965.

The era of military government begun by the 1963 coup lasted solidly until 1982.

In January 1965, López Arellano deposed the San Pedro Sula officials and replaced them with his allies in the National Party. Many Liberal Party politicians did not accept the legitimacy of the 1965 Congressional and Presidential elections, but were pressured to accept the results. The U.S., via Ambassador Burrows, also urged politicians to participate in the new government. Adolf Berle, who had earlier visited Villeda Morales to investigate him for the CIA, now convinced him to acquiesce to the military regime.

The U.S. increased its economic control of Honduras, while the country fell further into debt. U.S. companies controlled the fruit industry and the mining industry; the two largest Honduran banks were acquired by American companies. More money and goods were exported than came in, however. Land ownership remained disproportionate, unemployment rose, and the distribution of wealth grew more unequal than it already was.
