= 1956 Honduran coup d'état =

Military coup against Pres. Julio Lozano Díaz

1956 Honduran coup d'etat
Date	October 21, 1956
Location	Tegucigalpa, Honduras
Result	Coup d'état successful: President Lozano detained and deposed; Previous election of deputies to the National Constituent Assembly declared void; Establishment of military junta in place of government

Belligerents
(Honduras) Honduran Military Junta	Government of Honduras

Commanders and leaders
General Roque J. Rodríguez; Colonel Héctor Caraccioli; Major Roberto Gálvez Barnes	President Julio Lozano Díaz

The 1956 Honduran coup d'état occurred when the Honduran military removed acting President Julio Lozano Díaz on October 21, 1956.

The coup was led by a military junta, consisting of General Roque J. Rodríguez, Colonel Héctor Caraccioli, and Major Roberto Gálvez Barnes, and resulted in the junta governing Honduras until elections were held in 1957. The coup came in response to growing political instability, the suppression of public opposition, and concerns over Lozano Díaz's efforts to consolidate power after suspending the legislature and unilaterally declaring himself president in 1954. This event marked a turning point in Honduran political history, ushering in a period of military involvement in governance and setting a precedent for future interventions by the armed forces in national politics.

== Background ==
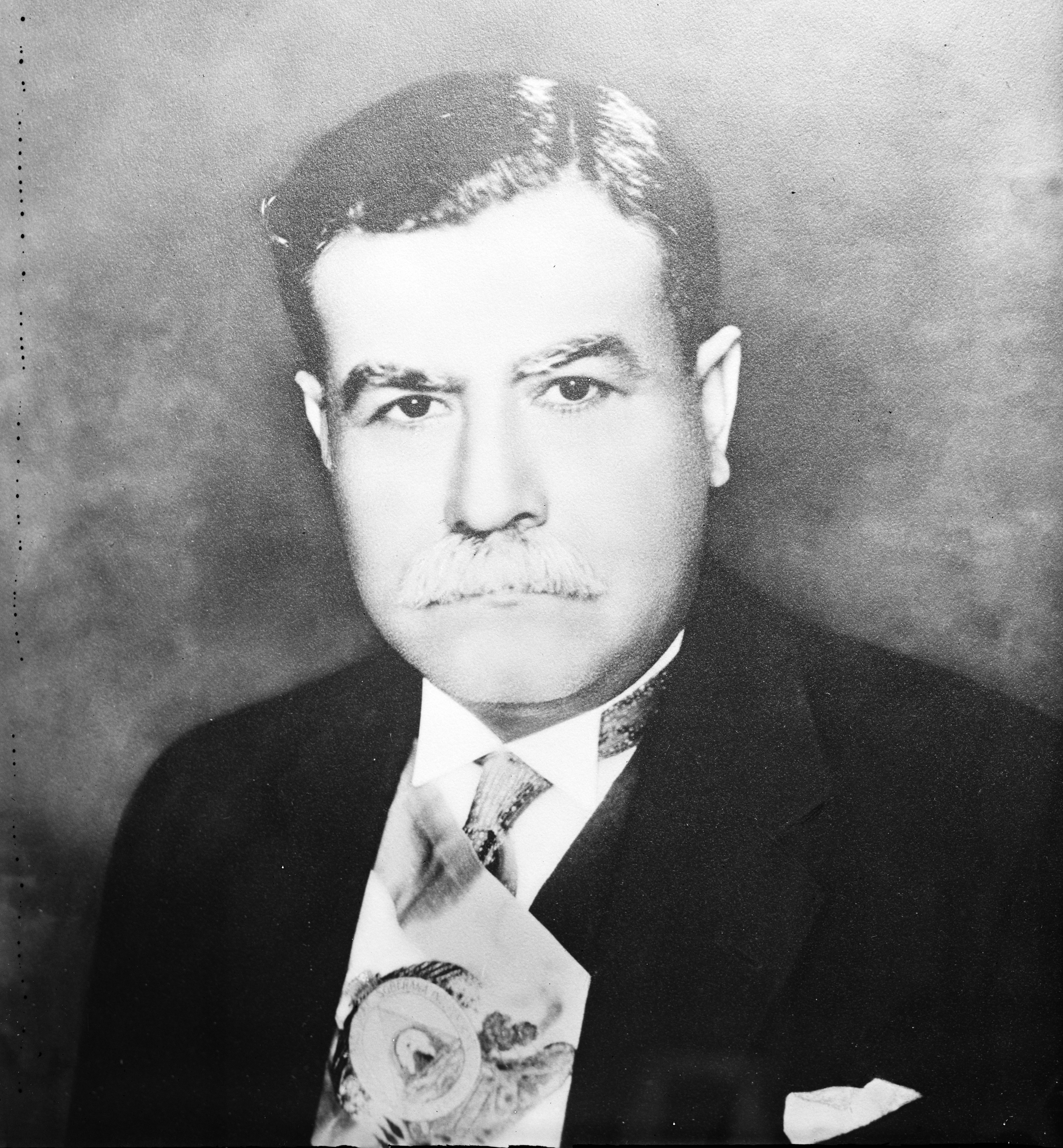
President Tiburcio Carías who governed Honduras from 1933-1949. Attempted a political comeback in 1956 but failed.

By the mid-20th century, Hondurans were agitating for political and labor reforms. The country had emerged from the regime of Tiburcio Carías Andino (in office 1933–1949), after which Juan Manuel Gálvez (in office 1949–1954) was elected. During Gálvez's presidency, workers had begun organizing strikes and protests demanding better labor conditions. Labor movements against the American based United Fruit Company (UFCO) gained particular momentum. The Great Strike of 1954, became a defining event, with workers demanding better wages and conditions. Political parties like the Liberal Party of Honduras and the PDRH (Partido Democratico Revolucionario de Honduras) played a central role in organizing protests, in the face of internal disagreements.

=== Honduran labor rights movements ===
The 1950s in Honduras were defined by large wealth gaps between the rich owners, and many poor laborers. The people of Honduras, especially Indigenous peoples, were tired of their land being exploited by national fruit companies. In 1952, the first-ever agrarian consensus found that just 4.2% of the population owned 56.8% of arable land, while 65.1% of the population controlled only 15.7%. All the while, many of the wealthy landowners did not know how to maintain and upkeep their land effectively, as their land was used more for luxurious rather than productive purposes. Additionally, fruit companies in Honduras hoarded land by keeping 75% of their land unused as a reserve. Disenfranchised and angry farmers began seeking land reforms, but were frustrated by their lack of power on public affairs. The General Strike of 1954 against the United Fruit Company was a clear instance of these poor laborers standing up against the powerful elite.

==== The United Fruit Company's role in Honduras ====
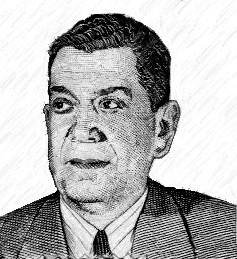
President Juan Manuel Gálvez, who governed Honduras from 1949-1954, after President Carías. He resigned prematurely claiming poor health, leaving the country to be treated in Miami and opening the door for Lozano.

The United Fruit Company expanded into Honduras in the 1920s and quickly consolidated power by out-performing rival fruit companies, allowing them to leverage said power to lobby the government and secure their interests. Additionally, President Gálvez (in office 1949-1954) naturally served the interests of fruit companies as he had previously been an attorney for fruit companies in Honduras. Fruit company interests meant getting rid of labour organizations, leading to increased exploitation of labor from farmers. The company was also able to obtain tax-free concessions from the Honduran government, indiscriminately fire workers, and build their empire by expanding infrastructure into neighboring countries. While UFCO yielded much power on the Honduran people, angry workers were still able to successfully carry out the Great Strike of 1954.

==== The Great Strike of 1954 ====
Before turning to mass protests and strikes, Hondurans had been attempting to regain their land through the courts but fruit company giants made for strong opposition. Therefore, In April 1954 dock workers demanded they get paid double their salary with paid holidays; as stated in their law. By May 5, almost 15% of Honduras' labor force; around 25,000 people were on strike. The UFCO manager refused to negotiate with the workers so long as they remained on strike. In this lull, workers from the Standard Fruit Company also joined the strike. In the spirit of the strike, workers in other industries such as those in tobacco factories and of the Coca-Cola corporation, got inspired and joined the movement. Negotiations between UFCO and workers resulted in some improvements. While workers demanded a 72% wage increase, they only received a 21% increase. These results were a step in the right direction, but the contracts that were conjured up by the company purposefully left loop holes and laid the grounds for thousands of layoffs down the line.

=== 1954 Presidential election ===
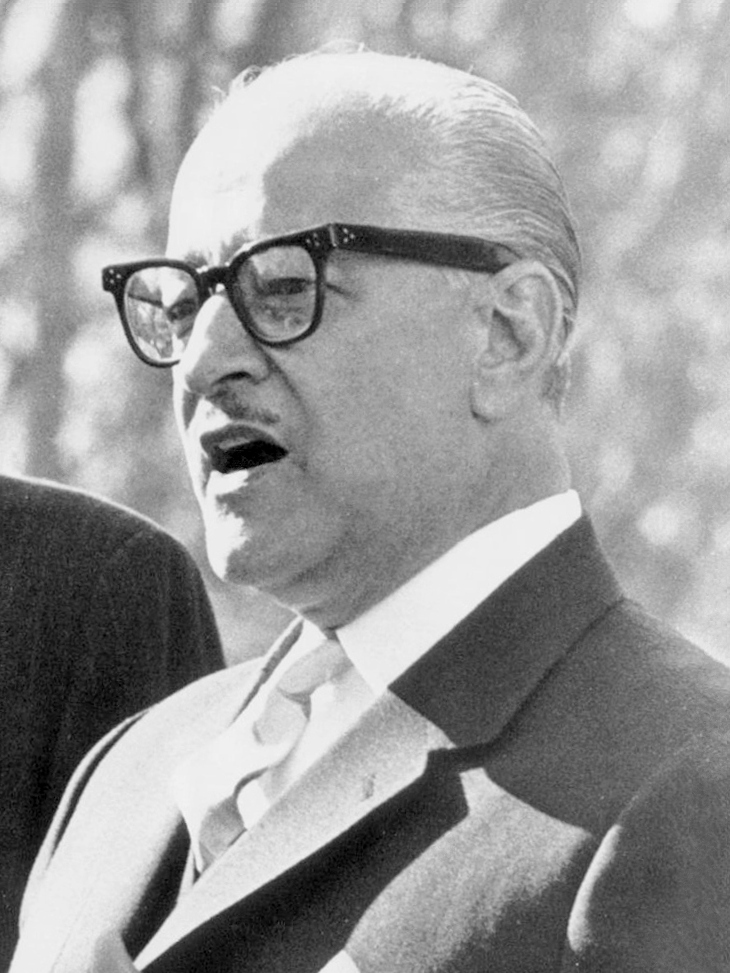
Ramón Villeda Morales was the Liberal presidential candidate for the 1954 elections. He was unable to form a government because the Liberals failed to secure enough congressional seats.

Shortly following these strikes, presidential elections were held on October 10, 1954. Dr. José Ramón Villeda Morales, also known as Ramón Villeda Morales, became the Liberal Party candidate for this election. Of nearly 400,000 eligible voters, Ramón Villeda Morales, received a large plurality of 121,213 votes, but he lacked a majority by just over 8,000 votes. Former President Tiburcio Carías, the National Party Candidate, followed with 77,041 votes, and Abraham Williams Calderón from the National Reformist Movement (MNR) received 53,041 votes. Prior to the election, Morales was a trained physician and created the Liberal Party's newspaper which aided the election campaigns of fellow politicians pushing for reform.

Although Villeda Morales won the presidential race, the Liberal Party failed to secure enough congressional seats to confirm Villeda Morales as president, leading to a political deadlock between the Liberal Party, the National Party, and the National Reformist Movement (MNR) who could not agree on the next president. By law, congress therefore was obliged to elect a chief executive. Carías' National Party loyalists had twenty-two deputies, MNR twelve, and Liberals twenty-three. A bloc of solid Liberal votes with the MNR still lacked three for the needed quorum. To complicate matters, Juan Manuel Gálvez resigned prematurely on November 15, claiming poor health. He turned his office over to Vice-President Julio Lozano Díaz. With Morales unable to take the presidency, Vice President Lozano Díaz dissolved the legislature and declared himself the new president.

Candidate	Party	Votes	%
Ramón Villeda Morales	Liberal Party	121,213	48.10
Tiburcio Carías Andino	National Party	77,726	30.85
Abraham Williams Calderón	National Reformist Movement	53,041	21.05
Total		251,980	100.00
Valid votes		251,980	99.75
Invalid/blank votes		644	0.25
Total votes		252,624	100.00
Registered voters/turnout		411,354	61.41
Source: Nohlen

=== Lozano's rule ===
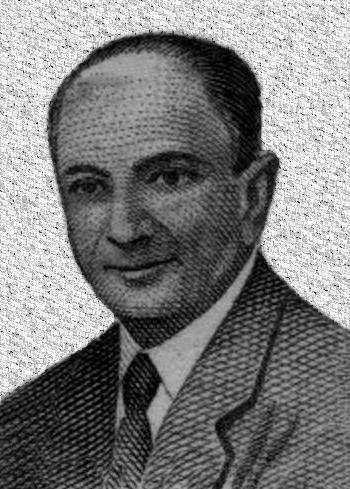
Julio Lozano Díaz was the President of Honduras overthrown in the coup. He was Gálvez's Vice President. In a political deadlock, Vice President Lozano dissolved legislature and declared himself president.

Lozano declared that he would form a national government with cabinet members taken from all major parties and received pledges of support from all three candidates in the 1954 election. However, as self-declared president, Lozano went on to create his own party; the Party of National Unity (Partido de Unidad Nacional, PUN), and forced Villeda Morales into political exile. His popularity continued to decline in the wake of Honduras's labor rights movement due to its lack of reforms and the government's inability to force the fruit companies to apply the terms of the collective agreement that ended the 1954 strike. Lozano creating his own party, the PUN, clearly asserted his ambitions to replace the traditional parties with one that he controlled and could use to prolong his power. He reduced the Council of State to a consultative body, and postponed elections. The activities of other parties were limited and by August 1956 Lozano had forced Villeda Morales and other Liberal leaders into political exile.

== The coup ==
On October 7, 1956, elections for the Constituent Assembly were held. These elections were the first in which Honduran women participated, accounting for a turnout of over 400,000 voters. However, Lozano Díaz's government control of the electoral machinery, caused citizens to claim corruption. Former President Tiburcio Carías Andino urged his followers to abstain from voting due to the fact that he felt despaired in his prospects of obtaining any seats.

Party	Votes	%	Seats
Party of National Unity	370,318	89.44	58
Liberal Party	41,724	10.08	0
National Party	2,003	0.48	0
Total	414,045	100.00	58
Total votes	512,694	–	
Source: Nohlen

With the Liberals in exile and Carías' Nationalists abstaining, official election results gave Lozano's coalition a 90% majority with 370,318 votes for the PUN. The Liberals received 41,726 votes, and the Nationalists only 2,000. The president's congressional victory was short-lived as the opposition's boycott and the suspicious results increased political instability. Throughout his rule, Lozano's popularity waned and the regime was forced to rely increasingly on violence due to protests and strikes occurring throughout the country. As it became clear that the president was preparing to maintain himself in power indefinitely, the military decided that it had had enough. Lozano's increasingly harsh rule had been spreading throughout the country and it appeared that both Honduran and foreign business interests were not averse to a change in presidency.

On October 21, 1956, the Honduran Military staged a coup, led by:

- General Roque J. Rodríguez (Director of the military academy in Tegucigalpa)
- Colonel Héctor Caraccioli, (Commander of the Honduran Air Force)
- Major Roberto Gálvez, (Son of former President Juan Manuel Gálvez and Minister of Development)

This coup ousted President Julio Lozano Díaz, where he was given notice to resign overnight on the basis of national stability concerns. That same morning, air force planes patrolled the skies and troops deployed on the street. Lozano Díaz officially resigned after having secured safety for himself and his associates.

The military junta, with Rodríguez as their leader, organized a military government to rule the country. By July 1957, however, Rodríguez resigned from the government due to the pressures and machinations of the minister of defense, aviation colonel Oswaldo Lopez Arellano.

Summary of key players
Name	Role in the coup	Background
Julio Lozano Díaz	Deposed President	Vice President turned President; declared himself in power after a legislative deadlock in 1954
José Ramón Villeda Morales	Exiled Opposition Leader	Liberal Party leader, won the most votes in the 1954 election but was prevented from assuming the presidency
Roque J. Rodriguez	Military Junta Leader	Director of the military academy, appointed as leader of the military junta after the coup
Héctor Caraccioli	Coup Organizer (Air Force Commander)	Head of the Honduran Air Force, key figure in the military intervention
Roberto Galvez Barnes	Coup Organizer (Minister of Development)	Son of former President Juan Manuel Gálvez, served as Minister of Development
Oswaldo López Arellano	Minister of Defense	Colonel in the Air Force, later became a major political figure, becoming president in the 1963 coup
Tiburcio Carías Andino	Former President, opposed elections	Long-time authoritarian ruler (1933–1949), attempted a political comeback in 1954 but failed
Juan Manuel Gálvez	Former President, left office prior to crisis	President of Honduras (1949–1954), oversaw economic growth and labor reforms but left the country for health reasons, allowing Lozano Díaz to take power.

=== Motivations for the coup ===
The junta (General Roque J. Rodríguez, Colonel Héctor Caraccioli, and Major Roberto Gálvez) reasoned that the armed forces could not ignore the needs of the Honduran people who desired a change in regime to one of law and order. They justified that they had orchestrated the coup to spare the country from further chaos. For the first time in Honduran history, the military had acted as an autonomous institution rather than an instrument of a political party or an individual leader. Furthermore, it was also the first military coup in the country's history without bloodshed. As a whole, the military had received training by the United States military which led to the new rulers representing younger, more nationalistic, and reform-minded elements, who had previously received training by the United States military.

Prior to this coup, the military had primarily served as an appendage of whatever political party or faction happened to be in power. Now it was acquiring the organization, cohesion, and strength to act independently. The coup represented a major turning point in the post-World War II period, restructuring Honduras' political system, not only because it represented the armed forces' first modern intervention in national governance, but also because of the civilian personalities involved in the coup and the administrative trajectory of the military of 1956-57.

== Aftermath ==
The military junta that took control of the government in October 1956 had promised to return the country to civilian control upon a return to constitutional normality and held elections in September 1957 for the Constituent Assembly. On November 15, 1957, the Constituent Assembly elected Ramon Villeda Morales, who had won a plurality of the vote in 1954 prior to Lozano seizing power, as president. While no direct presidential election was held, the junta handed control over to the civilian government on December 21, 1957, when the new constitution went into effect. Once in power, Villeda Morales' Liberal Party pushed to include Title XIII in this revised constitution. Title XIII provided the military a secret budget along with greater autonomy and power which fed the escalation of militarization in the country and compromised democratic gains. Scholars such as Kirk Bowman conclude this was likely a result of pressure by the junta, United Fruit Company executives, and the United States Department of State for Villeda Morales to accept a deal granting the military autonomy in exchange for their support of his presidency.

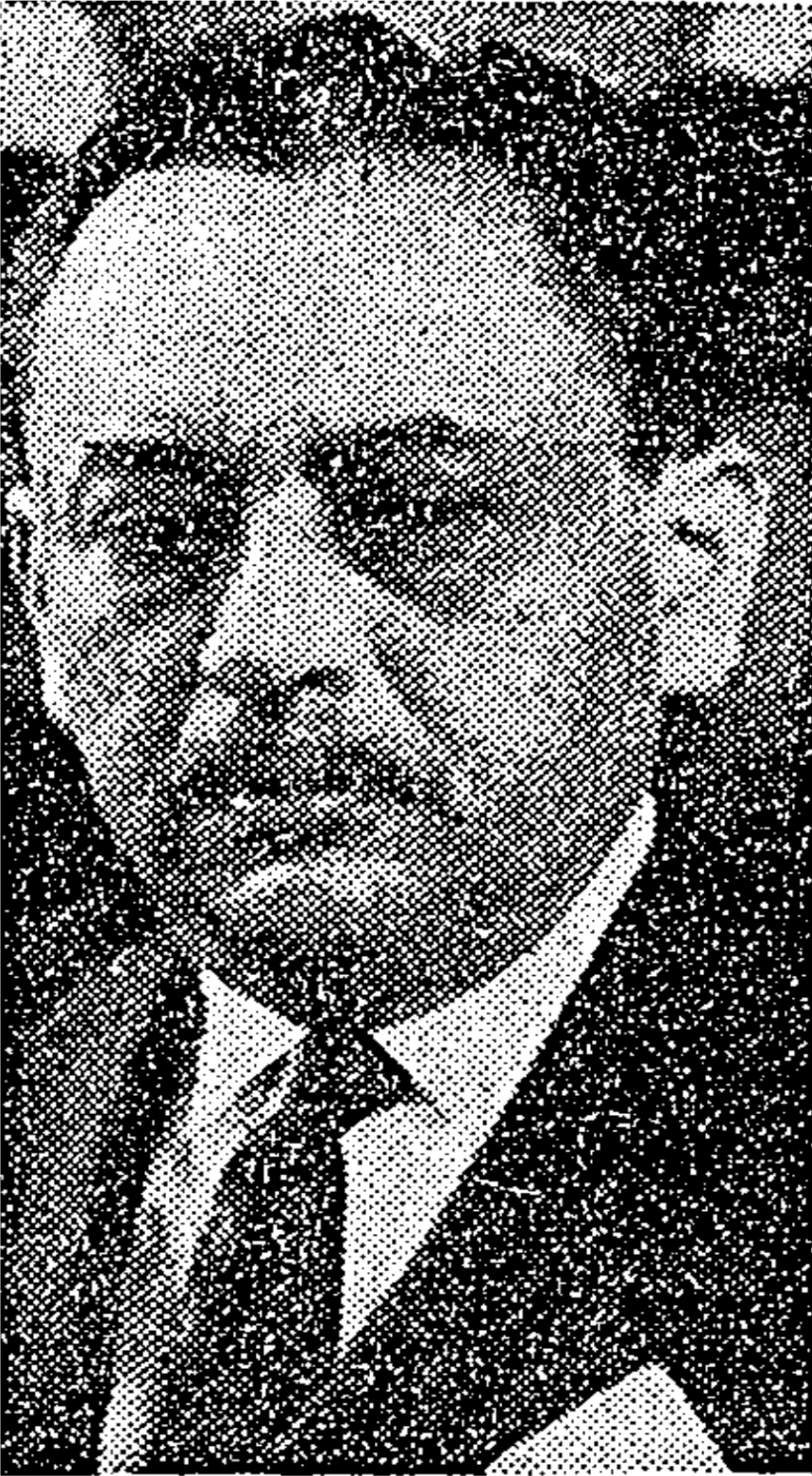
Oswaldo Lopez Arellano was a Colonel in the Air Force who pressured Rodríguez to resign as leader of the military junta. He later became a major political figure and eventually president in the 1963 Coup, replacing Villeda Morales.

In his term as president, Villeda Morales' government focused on modernizing Honduras, building infrastructure, labor reform, public welfare, and health. With a heavily labor-focused agenda that launched new welfare benefits and a labor code for the Honduran working class, his policies drew animosity from anticommunist elements in Honduras and the United States. Regardless, Honduras cooperated with the Kennedy administration and joined the American Alliance for Progress initiative under Villeda Morales. Under pressure by the Federal Bureau of Investigation and Central Intelligence Agency who were working to identify communists within Honduras and sever ties with Cuba, Villeda Morales also cut diplomatic ties to Cuba. The Honduran military also pressured the government at the behest of the United States, who leveraged a 1954 agreement between the two countries for military aid and their relationship to ensure Honduras followed American policies in Latin America.

Civil-military relations deteriorated greatly throughout Villeda Morales' presidency. After a violent attempted coup d'état in 1959 led by Colonel Armando Velásquez Cerrato support by some elements of the military left numerous dead and was only narrowly prevented by students and unionist supporters, Villeda Morales established a militarized Civil Guard. The Civil Guard and military often fought openly, and another coup was routed by the Civil Guard in 1961. Villeda Morales was eventually removed from office by a military coup on October 3, 1963, ten days before the election.

While Villeda Morales had grown less popular within the Liberal Party due to concessions to the opposition, military, and United States, and relations with the military had deteriorated, the coup was instead a preemptive attempt by the military to prevent the expected winner, opposing Liberal Party candidate Modesto Rodas Alvarado, from assuming the presidency. Rodas Alvarado had run on a platform of demilitarization and, along with other politicians, had suggested abolishing the military entirely. Colonel Oswaldo López Arellano was declared President and carried out a violent coup where Civil Guardsmen were killed in their sleep, with students and civilian resistors violently crushed over the following days. Villeda Morales and Rodas Alvarado were both deported to Costa Rica. The military would effectively control the government until 1982.
