= 1956 Honduran Constituent Assembly election =

Constituent Assembly elections were held in Honduras on 7 October 1956. Prior to the elections, President Julio Lozano Díaz established his own party, the Party of National Unity. The elections were allegedly heavily rigged and the PUN won all 58 seats.

== Conduct ==
A group of protesting Liberals were fired on by police in Tegucigalpa.

== Results ==
| Party | Votes | % | Seats |
|---|---|---|---|
| Party of National Unity | 370,318 | 89.44 | 58 |
| Liberal Party | 41,724 | 10.08 | 0 |
| National Party | 2,003 | 0.48 | 0 |
| Total | 414,045 | 100.00 | 58 |
| Total votes | 512,694 | – | |
Source: Nohlen

== Aftermath ==
Shortly after the elections the government announced that the Constituent Assembly would convene on 1 November and that it would elect Julio Lozano Díaz as president with General Abraham Williams Calderón as first vice president. However, a military coup took place on 21 October. The top conspirators included Colonel Héctor Caraccioli, head of the air force, Major Roberto Gálvez Barnes, Minister of Development and General Roque J. Rodríguez, director of the military academy in Tegucigalpa. They organized a military government with Rodríguez as its apparent leader, primarily because of his seniority. Lozano was exiled and Fresh elections were held in September 1957.

== Bibliography ==
- Anderson, Thomas P. The war of the dispossessed: Honduras and El Salvador, 1969. Lincoln: University of Nebraska Press. 1981.
- Bardales B., Rafael. Historia del Partido Nacional de Honduras. Tegucigalpa: Servicopiax Editores. 1980.
- Becerra, Longino. Evolución histórica de Honduras. Tegucigalpa: Baktun Editorial. 1983.
- Becerra, Longino. El poder político. Tegucigalpa: Editorial Baktun. Two volumes. 1994.
- Bertrand Anduray, María Luisa Soto de. Historia de la mujer hondureña: época independiente. Tegucigalpa: Instituto Hondureño de Cultura Hispánica. 1992.
- Bowdler, George A. And Patrick Cotter. Voter participation in Central America, 1954–1981. Washington, D.C.: University Press of America, Inc. 1982.
- Cálix Rodríguez, José Alvaro. Caracterización y análisis del sistema electoral en Honduras. Tegucigalpa: FIDE, PNUD. 2001.
- Dodd, Thomas J. Tiburcio Carías: portrait of a Honduran political leader. Baton Rouge: Louisiana State University Press. 2005.
- Dunkerley, James. Power in the isthmus: a political history of modern Central America. London: Verso. 1988.
- Elections in the Americas A Data Handbook Volume 1. North America, Central America, and the Caribbean. Edited by Dieter Nohlen. 2005.
- Euraque, Darío A. Reinterpreting the banana republic: region and state in Honduras, 1870–1972. Chapel Hill: The University of North Carolina Press. 1996.
- Fernández, Arturo. Partidos políticos y elecciones en Honduras 1980. Tegucigalpa: Editorial Guaymuras. Second edition. 1983.
- Kantor, Harry. Patterns of politics and political systems in Latin America. Chicago: Rand McNally and Company. 1969.
- Martz, John D. Central America, the crisis and the challenge. Chapel Hill: University of North Carolina Press. 1959.
- Morris, James A. Honduras: caudillo politics and military rulers. Boulder: Westview Press. 1984.
- Parker, Franklin D. The Central American republics. Westport: Greenwood Press. Reprint of 1964 original. 1981.
- Political handbook of the world 1956. New York, 1957.
- Posas, Mario and Rafael del Cid. La construcción del sector público y del estado nacional en Honduras (1876-1979). San José: EDUCA. Second edition. 1983.
- Sabillón Pineda de Flores, Milady. La mujer en los partidos políticos. Tegucigalpa: Alin. 1998.
- Villars, Rina. Para la casa más que para el mundo: sufragismo y feminismo en la historia de Honduras. Tegucigalpa: Editorial Guaymuras. 2001.
