= 1954 Honduran general election =

General elections were held in Honduras on 10 October 1954. The elections were relatively honest. and saw Ramón Villeda Morales of the Liberal Party emerge as the most popular presidential candidate with 48% of the vote. However, the constitution required Congress to confirm the president if no candidate received a majority in the popular vote. The Liberals did not have a majority in Congress, and the National Party and National Reformist Movement (MNR) agreed to block Villeda's candidacy, although they were unable to agree on a candidate of their own. The two parties boycotted the confirmation session in November – an idea proposed by US Ambassador Whitting Willauer – meaning those present did not form a quorum.

Amid the crisis, incumbent president Juan Manuel Gálvez handed over the presidency to his vice-president Julio Lozano Díaz due to illness. Lozano decided to remain in office, dissolved congress and appointed a 59-member State Advisory Council with representatives from the Liberal, National and MNR. It was to write a new constitution, labor code, social security law, and act merely in an advisory capacity to the president.

== Results ==
=== President ===
Candidate	Party	Votes	%
Ramón Villeda Morales	Liberal Party	121,213	48.10
Tiburcio Carías Andino	National Party	77,726	30.85
Abraham Williams Calderón	National Reformist Movement	53,041	21.05
Total		251,980	100.00
Valid votes		251,980	99.75
Invalid/blank votes		644	0.25
Total votes		252,624	100.00
Registered voters/turnout		411,354	61.41
Source: Nohlen

=== Congress ===
Party	Seats	+/–
Liberal Party	24	+24
National Party	23	–26
National Reformist Movement	12	New
Total	59	+10
Source: Parker

== Bibliography ==
- Anderson, Thomas P. The war of the dispossessed: Honduras and El Salvador, 1969. Lincoln: University of Nebraska Press. 1981.
- Bardales B., Rafael. Historia del Partido Nacional de Honduras. Tegucigalpa: Servicopiax Editores. 1980.
- Becerra, Longino. Evolución histórica de Honduras. Tegucigalpa: Baktun Editorial. 1983.
- Bowdler, George A. And Patrick Cotter. Voter participation in Central America, 1954-1981. Washington, D.C.: University Press of America, Inc. 1982.
- Dodd, Thomas J. Tiburcio Carías: portrait of a Honduran political leader. Baton Rouge: Louisiana State University Press. 2005.
- Elections in the Americas A Data Handbook Volume 1. North America, Central America, and the Caribbean. Edited by Dieter Nohlen. 2005.
- Euraque, Darío A. Reinterpreting the banana republic: region and state in Honduras, 1870-1972. Chapel Hill: The University of North Carolina Press. 1996.
- Fernández, Arturo. Partidos políticos y elecciones en Honduras 1980. Tegucigalpa: Editorial Guaymuras. Second edition. 1983.
- Haggerty, Richard and Richard Millet. 1995. “Historical setting.” Merrill, Tim L., ed. 1995. Honduras: a country study. Washington, D.C.: Federal Research Division, Library of Congress.
- MacCameron, Robert. Bananas, labor and politics in Honduras: 1954-1963. Syracuse: Syracuse University.
- Martz, John D. Central America, the crisis and the challenge. Chapel Hill: University of North Carolina Press. 1959. 1983.
- Martz, John D. Central America, the crisis and the challenge. Chapel Hill: University of North Carolina Press. 1959.
- Morris, James A. Honduras: caudillo politics and military rulers. Boulder: Westview Press. 1984.
- Parker, Franklin D. The Central American republics. Westport: Greenwood Press. Reprint of 1964 original. 1981.
- Political handbook of the world 1954. New York, 1955.
- Posas, Mario and Rafael del Cid. La construcción del sector público y del estado nacional en Honduras (1876-1979). San José: EDUCA. Second edition. 1983.
- Villars, Rina. “La conquista del voto: mociones legislativas (1949-1953) y percepción social sobre los derechos de la mujer.” Estudios de la mujer: una antología. 2004. Tegucigalpa: Universidad Nacional Autónoma de Honduras.
- Weaver, Frederick Stirton. Inside the volcano: the history and political economy of Central America. Boulder: Westview Press. 1994.
