= Honduras in World War II =

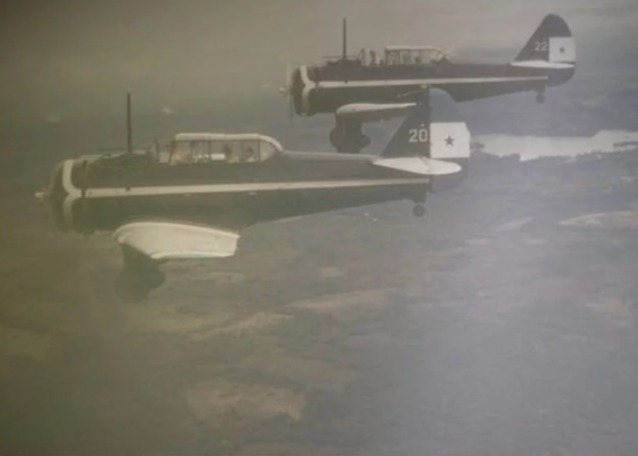
Honduran Air force patrolling the north coast in 1942.

The Republic of Honduras declared war on the Empire of Japan on December 8, 1941, after the Japanese attack on Pearl Harbor and then also declared war on Nazi Germany and Fascist Italy on December 12 of the same year. Although its support for the Allies during World War II was active between 1942 and 1945, the Honduran contribution to war efforts would be mainly logistics and intelligence, although it did come to face a German submarine in 1942.

== Background ==
Honduras had declared war on the German Empire on July 18, 1918 after entering to World War I, but by 1930, the Weimar Republic and the Republic of Honduras decide to establish formal diplomatic relations. This move was also partly influenced by the fact that at that time, Honduras had a considerable German immigrant population distributed throughout the territory. It is worth mentioning that thanks to the dissemination of scientific racism, in the 1920s a proposal appeared for a project that consisted of creating a new miscegenation in the Central American country. The aim of the plan was to encourage the racial mixture of Honduran farmers and indigenous people with white European immigrants, mainly from Scandinavian, German, French and English origin.

This would be the most effective means of building a new "race" of Hondurans who, in the words of the architects of this proposal, would be more enterprising, industrious, honest, physically more alike, among other things. To accomplish this, in the 1920s and 1930s the arrival of more European immigrants to Honduran soil was promoted. Once the National Socialist party took power in Germany, the relations of Honduras and Nazi Germany were formally established some time later by creating the consulate of the Third Reich in Tegucigalpa.

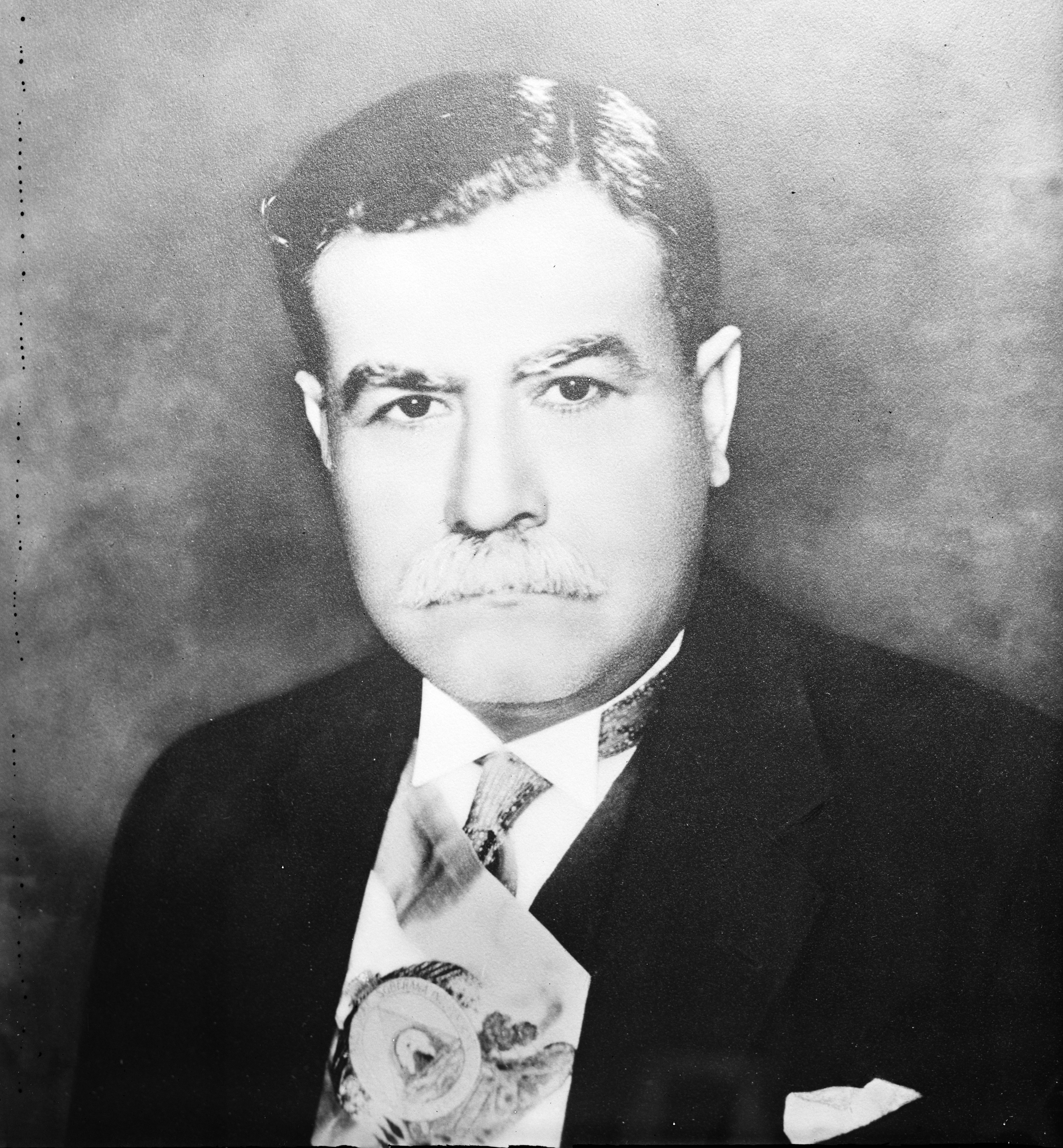
Tiburcio Carias Andino established diplomatic relations with Nazi Germany, Imperial Japan, and Fascist Italy.

Shortly afterwards, the Central American nation also decided to maintain diplomatic relations with the Empire of Japan in 1935. After that, the Honduran dictator would send a letter to the emperor Hirohito who would be delivered through the foreign minister of the empire Hachiro Arita as a show of affection for the Japanese people. The letter would be answered by the emperor himself.This was due to the fact that the Honduran dictator General Carias Andino was a sympathizer of fascism and felt admiration for fascist Italy and Nazi Germany, to the extent that both regimes served as patron for his government from 1937 during the time of the regime known as "El cariato".

=== Fascist sympathizers ===
Honduras had certain supporters of fascism and German national socialism in the political leadership as well as in civil life. The sympathy of a sector of the Honduran population with the German people was easy to understand during the time. The German immigrants were forerunners of national trade from the south to the north coast, and most of the trade of San Pedro had commercial relations with coffee import and export houses owned by notorious German families. Also many of the German people introduced new methods of production on national soil.

In the city of San Pedro Sula, the birthday of the German Fuhrer was celebrated by hanging flags with swastikas from balconies and windows on Third Avenue, in homage and admiration for Adolf Hitler. It is recorded that many newborns in the years of the war with the name of Adolf went out of sympathy for the leader of the Third Reich, some even bore the full name of the Chancellor of the Third Reich. There are also rumors that on one occasion German Kriegsmarine submariners were helped by Honduran residents to supply them with gasoline and food in the Moskitia region.

=== Deterioration of diplomatic relations with the Axis ===
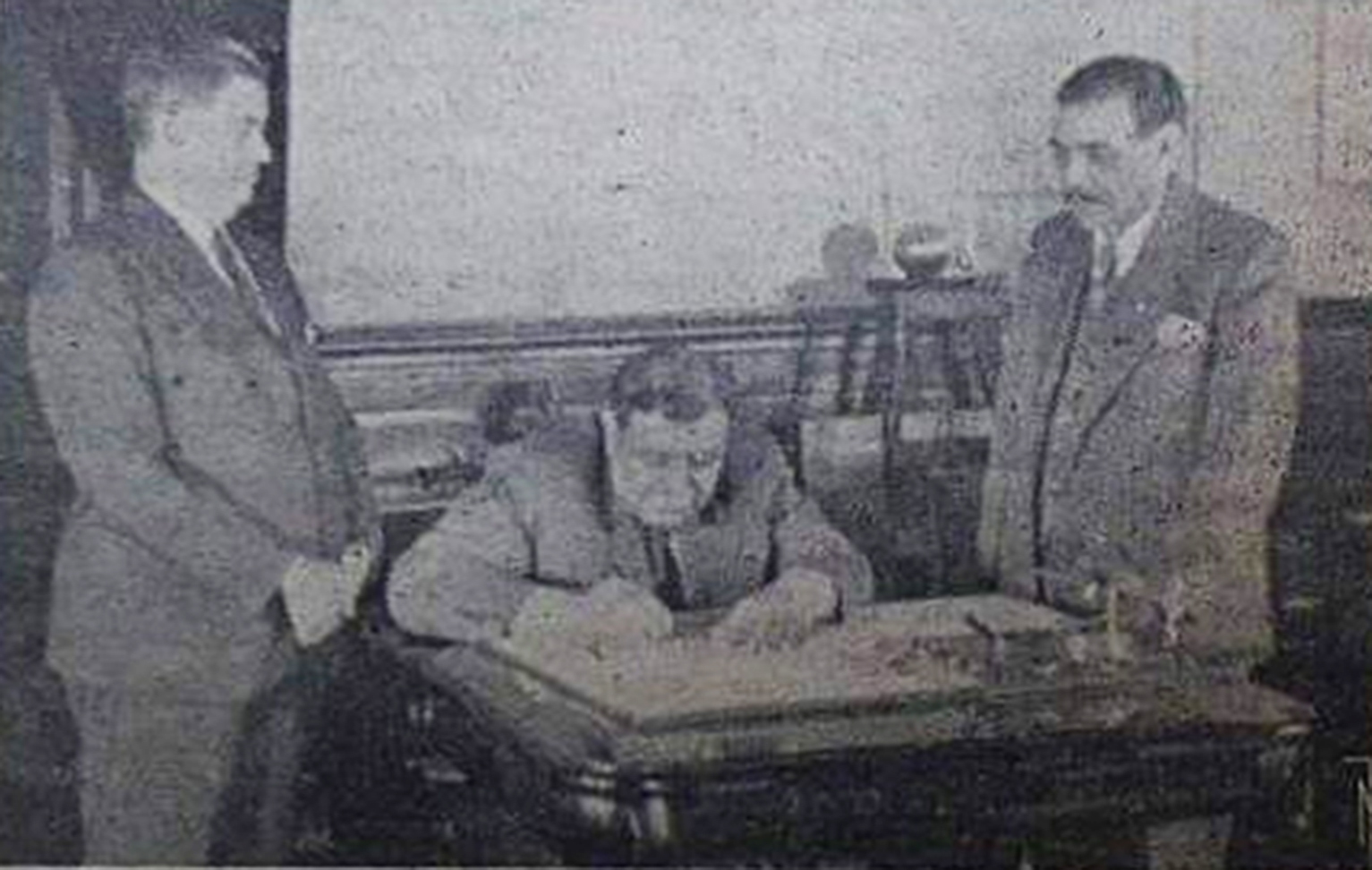
Official declaration of war on December 12 of 1941

Diplomatic relations between Honduras and the Axis nations would remain in place until 1941, even though after 1939 relations between Honduras and Germany began to deteriorate after the Third Reich decided to invade the Polish republic together with the Soviet Union and enter the war with the United Kingdom by launching airstrikes on London. Poland was one of the main commercial partners of Honduras in addition to having diplomatic agreements dating from the nineteenth century. Polish immigrants also added to the Anglo-Saxon Honduran community that was extensive on the north coast in the Bay Islands.

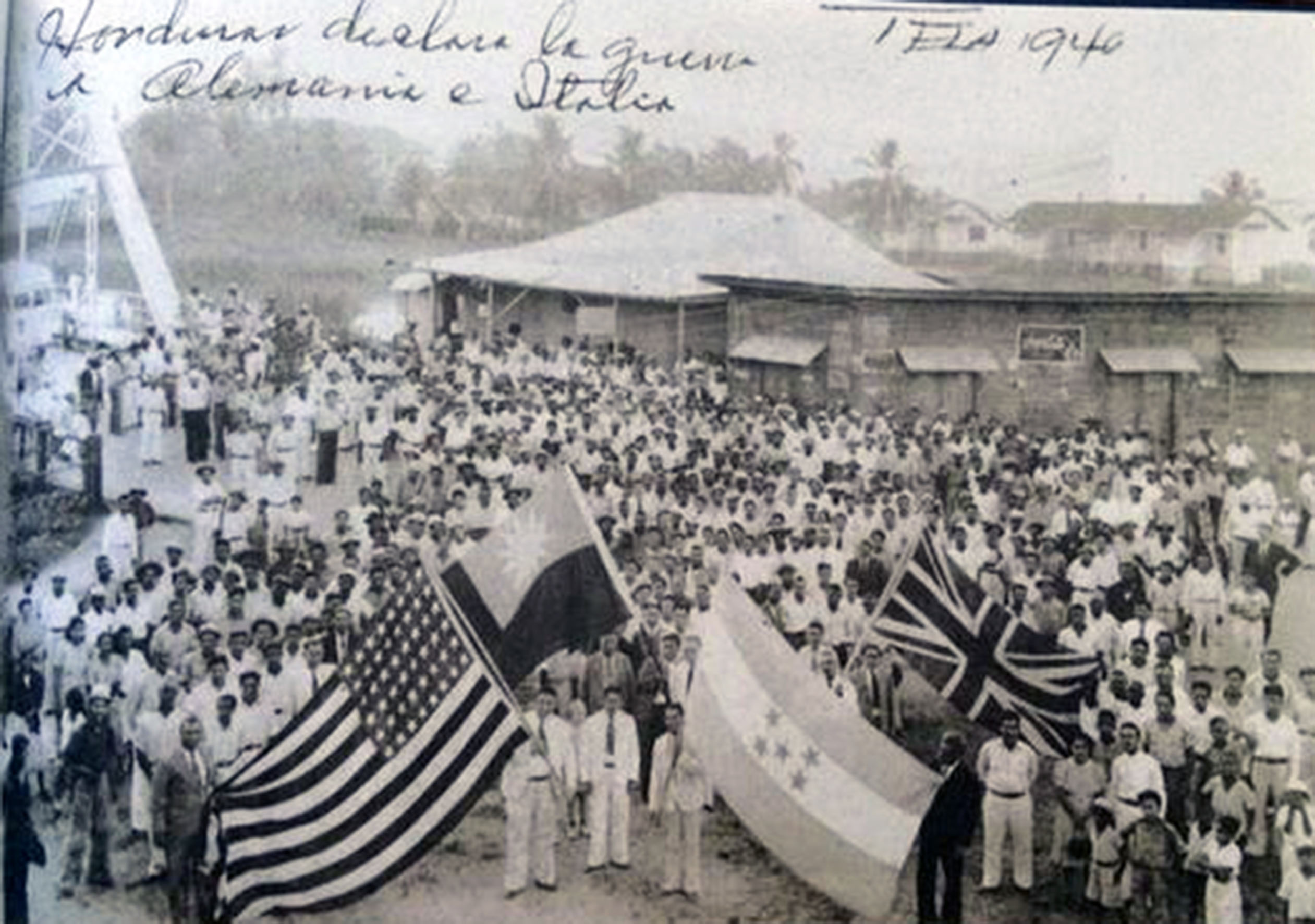
Celebration of Honduras joining the war efforts against the axis, the flag of Honduras can be seen next to that of the United Kingdom, the United States, and China.

In April 1941, the German consul in Tegucigalpa, Christian Zinsser, was expelled under a series of controversial events and under reports of having ties to the Gestapo. Honduras, along with other Central American nations such as Nicaragua, El Salvador, Guatemala, and Costa Rica would end up declaring war on all members of the Axis Powers in December 12, 1941. That same day, the Japanese would capture a merchant ship belonging to Honduras in the Republic of China that would be renamed by the Japanese as the Ekkai Maru.

== Air patrolling ==
Several Honduran ships were sunk in the Caribbean by German submarines, which had already been sighted in the Gulf of Fonseca and the Caratasca lagoon, therefore air patrols began in 1942. This was possible thanks to the dictatorship of Tiburcio Carias Andino who modernized the Honduran Army and founded the Honduran Air Force. The aircraft used for this operation were the North American NA-16, modified Boeing Model 40s, Model 95s, and Chance Vought F4U Corsair, all capable of carrying bombs. The first sighting of a German U-boat by the air force occurred on July 24, 1942. It was attacked with 60-pound bombs, being the first and possibly only official record of a military confrontation between military forces of the Republic of Honduras and Nazi Germany in national territory, although it is possible that other submarines were attacked by Honduran planes. It was rumored that several Hondurans who were sympathizing with the axis cause had helped some German submariners in La Moskitia to obtain food and fuel, which raised suspicions of Nazi infiltration in the country.

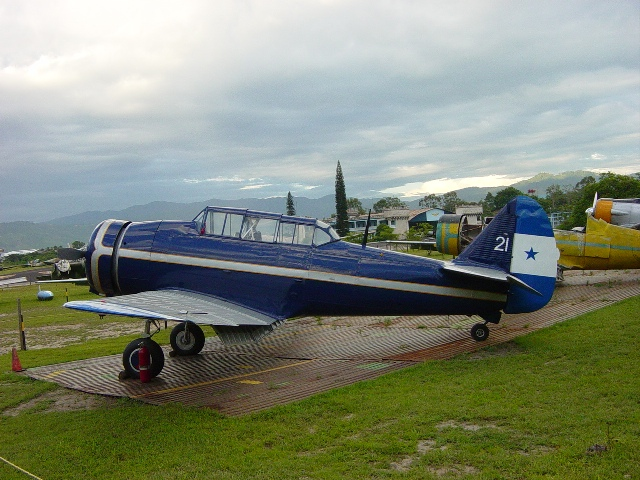
One of the original NA-16 plane that was used to patrolling the coasts during the war.

In addition to patrolling Honduran territory, Honduran airmen also flew in the vicinity of the Gulf of Mexico in joint support with other Latin American nations to prevent more ships destined for the United States from sinking. One of the planes of the Honduran air force that was carrying out patrols on the north coast disappeared on August 22 of the same year, which is said to have been killed by anti-aircraft fire from a submarine, this being the first Honduran casualty. In the city of Trujillo, an air base for hydroplanes was established to keep the country safe from the approach of more submarines since at that time there was a general fear that the country would one day be attacked by the Germans.

== Persecution of German Immigrants ==
The most controversial policy of the Government of Carias Andino was the seizure of assets and properties belonging to Honduran German families. Many were the goods that were owned by Germans, auctioned in Honduras in those years, the same German immigrants were not to blame for the Nazi policy carried out by Adolf Hitler; While it is true that many young Germans born in America were seduced by Hitler's oratory and crossed the ocean to join the ranks of the Wehrmacht and the Waffen SS, others in greater numbers repudiated those expansionist actions and were still stripped of their assets. And some even sent to concentration camps in the United States of America.

== Honduran Contribution to the War ==
The Honduran industry focused a lot on the production for the war effort, many of the raw materials produced in Honduras were sent to the North American country to bring supplies to the soldiers in the Pacific war, the North African theater, and then with the entrance of this to the European theater in 1944, in addition to that for those years the country was a great exporter of bananas to the United States. Many of these materials exported from Honduras were fruits, oils, coffee, rubber, wood and iron. In addition to the fact that Honduras is a country rich in natural resources, the extraction of these was made easier, in addition the infrastructure had been modernized a lot since the 1920s, which facilitated the transport of large shipments to the ports, especially thanks to the use of the national railway and the roads. One of the ships that participated in Operation Torch was the SS Contessa, a modified freighter with anti-aircraft turrets that carried ammunition and fuel up the Sebu River.

As for national soil that was within the American theater of war, the country did a great job in the fight to counteract the German presence in the Caribbean by patrolling the coasts also supporting the other Latin American countries in it. Regarding the participation of Hondurans on other fronts, there are records of several Honduran volunteers in the United States Army. Among them are Don José Paz Barahona, nicknamed "Joe Paz" by his battalion mates, who participated in the D-Day landing being one of the many Hispanic American soldiers in the war and returned safely home to Honduras after the war, and Luis Alemán Gómez, who after the end of the war was part of the allied occupation troops of Japan.

== Victims ==
List of Hondurans killed by German submarine attacks:

- SS TELA ship: 11 deceased
- San Blas ship: 75 deceased
- Nicolás Cuneo ship: 3 deceased
- POMPOON ship: 27 deceased
- Ship ss COMAYAGUA: 10 deceased
- SS CEIBA ship: 36 deceased
- SS ship AMAPALA: 1 deceased
- SS ship OLANCHO: 3 deceased
- SS ship CASTILLA: 24 deceased

== Consequences ==
=== Politics ===
Due to the deep proximity of Honduras with the United States and added to the enormous donation and purchase of modern US military equipment and fighter planes that were protagonists in the war such as the Chance Vought F4U Corsair, the Honduran army would end up adopting the American military model after World War II. The fall of fascism and the birth of the Cold War would initiate the adoption of a political system more similar to that of the United States. It would also recover diplomatic relations with Germany, more specifically now West Germany, Italy, and Japan.

=== Economy ===
There were some shortages of national products in the country due to the enormous shipment of raw materials to the United States and the Asia-Pacific front, Africa, and Europe. Although these would make a great increase in the Honduran economy that would be noticed during the 50's. But at the same time, it would create an economy based on the export of raw materials and the dependence on the purchase of these abroad. Labor overexploitation would cause the strike of 54, where the Honduran government would end up accepting better working conditions and social security for workers, notably improving the quality of life of workers.

The 1950s, similar in other countries, were established as a decade of economic prosperity and social order, although by the 1960s a series of coups would begin and by 1969 a slight economic decline would begin during the term of Oswaldo López Arellano. that would be recovered years later, although Honduras would continue to be dependent on the United States.

== See also ==
- Latin America during World War II
- History of Honduras 1932-1982
