= Law enforcement in Honduras =

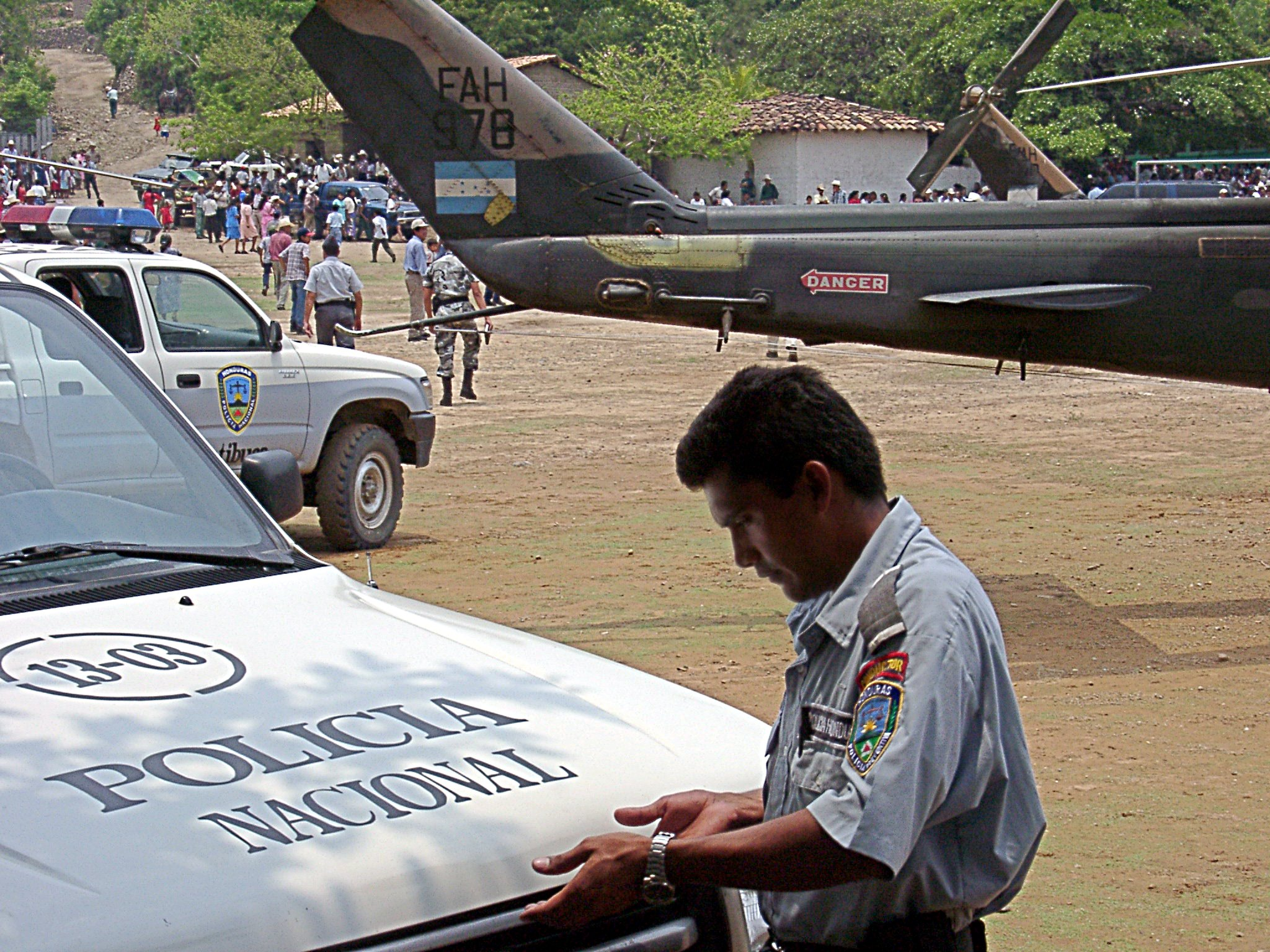
Honduran Police in San Francisco, Lempira

Law enforcement in Honduras is split among three law enforcement organisations.

- National Police of Honduras

== Current branches ==
- Transit Police (Honduras) (Policia de Transito), a police force in charge of automobile transportation. They take care of car crashes, parking violations and other infringements.
- DGIC (Dirección General de Investigaciones Criminalisticas), the agency that takes care of forensics and drug enforcement.
- Comando de Operaciones Especiales COECO (Cobras), a police tactical unit that deals primarily with countering riots, sniper shooting, and tactical operations.
- Tropa de Inteligencia y Grupos de Respuesta Especial de Seguridad (TIGRES), a police tactical unit that specializes in dealing with organized crime and hooliganism.

== Past law enforcement bodies ==
=== Civil Guard, now abolished ===
- Civil Guard in Honduras is a militarized police which was commanded directly by president Ramon Villeda Morales before his death, rather than the chief of the armed forces created in 1957.

=== Historical secret police organizations ===
- Departamento Nacional de Investigaciones (DNI) (National Investigation Department)

== See also ==
- Crime in Honduras

== Sources ==
- World Police Encyclopedia, ed. by Dilip K. Das & Michael Palmiotto. by Taylor & Francis. 2004,
- World Encyclopedia of Police Forces and Correctional Systems, 2nd. edition, Gale., 2006
- Sullivan, Larry E. et al. Encyclopedia of Law Enforcement. Thousand Oaks: Sage Publications, 2005.
