= Abraham Williams Calderón =

Honduran politician

Abraham de Jesús Williams Calderón

Vice President of Honduras
- In office 1 February 1933 – 1 January 1949
- President: Tiburcio Carías Andino
- Preceded by: Rafael Díaz Chávez
- Succeeded by: Julio Lozano Díaz

Personal details
- Born: 16 March 1894
- Died: 24 March 1986 (aged 92)
- Party: National Party of Honduras; Revolutionary Nationalist Movement
- Education: Massachusetts Institute of Technology; Union College of Schenectady

Abraham Williams Calderón (born 1894, died in 1986) was a Honduran politician. He was known as Vice President of Honduras during the administration of Tiburcio Carías Andino and president of the National Congress of Honduras, and presidential candidate of the Revolutionary Nationalist Movement in the 1954 elections.

Williams Calderón was born on 16 March 1894, in Choluteca. He studied at the Massachusetts Institute of Technology in 1919, and Union College in Schenectady, New York in 1921, from which he obtained his engineering degree. After returning to Honduras, he joined National Party of Honduras, and was later appointed as governor of Choluteca Department between 1924 during the administration of Miguel Paz Barahona. He also held other political offices during Paz Barahona administration.

In 1929 he was elected deputy in the National Congress of Honduras and on 14 December 1932 he was elected President of the National Congress. In the 1932 presidential elections, Williams Abraham was elected Vice President in the elections won by the nationalist candidate general Tiburcio Carias Andino. He took office on 1 February 1933. In February 1933, he was also appointed as minister of interior and justice. Abraham Williams Calderón was Vice President of Honduras from 1933 to 1949, together with the formula (Carias-Williams) which stayed in power without elections in the form of a dictatorship with the backing of the United States of America.

After 1949, Williams Calderón dissented from National Party of Honduras, and joined Revolutionary Nationalist Movement. He was the presidential candidate of the party in the 1954 elections.

In 1956, Williams Calderón joined the ticket of Julio Lozano Díaz as his vice-presidential candidate. The coup that took place in October 1956 ousted Lozano Díaz and prevented the swearing-in of Williams Calderón as vice president once again.

In 1957, during the presidency of Ramón Villeda Morales, Williams Calderón participated in the National Congress as a deputy for the department of Choluteca. He no longer run for any political office, and retired. He died on 24 March 1986.

He had three sons, including Vicente Williams Agasse.
