= 1963 Honduran general election =

Direct popular general elections were scheduled in Honduras for 13 October 1963.

The Liberal Party of Honduras selected Modesto Rodas Alvarado, even though the president Ramón Villeda Morales favoured another candidate. Villeda and most of the party maintained unity.

The National Party of Honduras nomination of Ramón Ernesto Cruz Uclés "... marked the requiem once and for all of the forty-year domination of Tiburcio Carías Andino over the National Party... Because Cruz defeated Carías' son, Gonzalo Carías Castillo, by just three votes in the convention." Immediately after the May convention, Carías resigned as the party’s jefe supreme and with his son formed the Popular Progressive Party of Honduras.

According to Kirk S. Bowman, "The 1963 election campaign favored Modesto Rodas Alvarado, the charismatic and fiery former president of the Constitutional Assembly, who promised to large campaign crowds that he would reduce the power of the military. There was a ground swell of support from various sectors of Honduran society to follow the Costa Rican model and proscribe the military."

According to Frederick Stirton Weaver, "Ten days before the 1963 presidential elections, the military, fearful of Villeda Morales's establishment of a Civil Guard independent of the military and encouraged by the fruit companies and domestic landlords, successfully overthrew the Villeda Morales government and canceled the elections, which probably would have been won by a Liberal colleague of the president's. Although the Kennedy administration refused to grant U.S. diplomatic recognition to the new regime, the Johnson administration did so a year later."
