= Honduran military junta of 1956–1957 =

Period of military rule in Honduras

The Military Junta of 1956–1957 in Honduras was a military triumvirate composed by General Roque Jacinto Rodríguez Herrera (Director of the "Francisco Morazán" Military Academy), Roberto Gálvez Barnes (an engineer who was Minister during Lozano's Government) and Héctor Caraccioli Moncada (chief of the Honduran Armed Forces).
It was in power between 21 October 1956 and 21 December 1957.

== History ==
The Colonels led a non-violent military coup against the unpopular President Julio Lozano Díaz in 1956. This is recorded as the first coup d'état in Honduras. They declared an amnesty for all political prisoners, and allowed the return to the country of exiles such as Dr. Ramón Villeda Morales

After many months of ruling over the Honduran people, tensions within the "Junta Militar" caused the reorganization of the Junta. After this reorganization, General Roque Rodriguez and Roberto Galvez Barnes left the Junta and Oswaldo López Arellano entered.

The Honduran Military allowed free and popular elections in 1957 for a Constituent Assembly which elected Ramón Villeda Morales as president for a 6-year term.

== 21 Oct 1956 - 21 Dec 1957 Military Government Junta ==
—	Roberto Gálvez Barnes	21 October 1956	18 November 1957	Military	(b. 1925 - d. 1996)
—	Roque Jacinto Rodríguez Herrera	30 October 1956	5 July 1957	Military	(b. 1898 - d. 1981)
—	Colonel Héctor Caraccioli Moncada	30 October 1956	21 December 1957	Military	(b. 1922 - d. 1975)
—	Oswaldo Enrique López Arellano	18 November 1957	21 December 1957	Military	(b. 1921 - d. 2010)

Political offices
Preceded by Julio Lozano Díaz	President of Honduras; 1956–1957	Succeeded by Ramón Villeda Morales
