= Revolutionary Nationalist Movement (Honduras) =

Defunct Honduran political party

The Revolutionary Nationalist Movement (Movimiento Nacional Revolucionario, MNR) was a Honduran political party. It was formed when moderate members of the National Party of Honduras (Partido Nacional de Honduras, PNH) split from the party after Tiburcio Carías Andino secured the PNH nomination for the 1954 Honduras presidential election. The MNR nominee for president that year was former vice president Abraham Williams Calderón; he received approximately 53,000 of 260,000 votes.

== See also ==
- List of political parties in Honduras
