= Juan Manuel Gálvez =

President of Honduras from 1949 to 1954

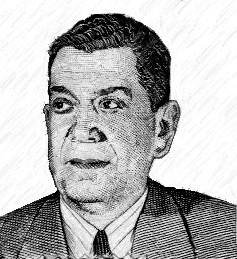

22nd President of Honduras
- In office 1 January 1949 – 5 December 1954
- Vice President: Julio Lozano Díaz
- Preceded by: Tiburcio Carías Andino
- Succeeded by: Julio Lozano Díaz

Personal details
- Born: Juan Manuel Gálvez Durón; 10 June 1887 Tegucigalpa, Honduras
- Died: 20 August 1972 (aged 85) Tegucigalpa, Honduras
- Party: National Party of Honduras
- Spouse: Laura Bárnes Paredes
- Education: Universidad Nacional Autónoma de Honduras
- Profession: Lawyer, politician

Juan Manuel Gálvez Durón (10 June 1887 – 20 August 1972) was President of Honduras from 1 January 1949 until 5 December 1954. His election, for the National Party of Honduras (PNH), ended the 16-year dictatorship of Tiburcio Carías Andino.

Once in office, Gálvez demonstrated more independence than had generally been anticipated. Some policies of the Carías administration, such as road building and the development of coffee exports, were continued and expanded. By 1953 nearly one-quarter of the government's budget was devoted to road construction. Gálvez also continued most of the prior administration's fiscal policies, reducing the external debt and ultimately paying off the last of the British bonds. The fruit companies continued to receive favorable treatment at the hands of the Gálvez administration; for example, United Fruit Company received a highly favorable twenty-five-year contract in 1949.

Gálvez, however, instituted some notable alterations from the preceding fifteen years. Education received increased attention and began to receive a larger share of the national budget. Congress actually passed an income tax law, although enforcement was sporadic at best. The most obvious change was in the political arena. A considerable degree of press freedom was restored, the Liberal Party and other groups were allowed to organize, and even some labor organization was permitted. The labor market was increasingly regulated in this period. Congress passed, and the president signed, legislation establishing the eight-hour workday, paid holidays for workers, limited employer responsibility for work-related injuries, and regulations for the employment of women and children.

Perhaps the most trying time of his administration occurred during the final months of his rule. In May, 1954, workers within the sectors of mining, brewing, textile making and at the Coca Cola Company, the Standard Fruit Company and the United Fruit Company all went on strike within a 10-day period during 5–14 May. While a collective agreement between the 11,000+ striking workers and the management of the Standard Fruit Company was reached by 21 May 1954, thereby becoming "the first time in Honduran history that a private corporation negotiates a collective agreement", the news was not so good elsewhere. That very day, perhaps learning what just happened at the Standard Fruit Company, the number of workers going on strike against the United Fruit Company increased from about 25,000 to about 100,000. This worker action may have brought a sense of panic to our 39th President for on 23 May 1954, he petitioned the U.S. Government's Eisenhower Administration to prepare its U.S. Marine Corps to land its armed forces in Honduras should the situation "spin out of control". The U.S. Navy took this request seriously and moved two of its warships into the nearby Gulf of Honduras. In addition, next door in Guatemala, the CIA supported Carlos Castillo Armas, who was preoccupied with removing the 25th President of Guatemala, Jacobo Arbenz Guzman, from Office, took some of his human resources off the task at hand and sent them into Honduras "to provide muscle for the United Fruit Company". However, after a long fight, and public opinion moving strongly against the United Fruit Company, an agreement was reached on 9 July 1954, between the 100,000 striking workers and company management. But our 39th President's troubles were not yet over; in 26–30 September 1954, Honduras was struck by Tropical Storm Gilda which killed 29 Hondurans, left about 3,000 of them homeless and caused some destruction of banana plantations thereby inspiring the United Fruit Company to fire 10,000 of its about 100,000 workers. This forced our 39th President's hand to appeal once again to the U.S. Government for aid; the Eisenhower Administration would answer this request.

Despite the difficult and politically tempting circumstances favorable to the imposition of a successor, Gálvez still went ahead with the scheduled free elections of 1954 and thus the 1954 Honduran general election took place on 10 October 1954.

Gálvez was deposed by his Vice President Julio Lozano Díaz on 5 December 1954 while being treated abroad for a heart condition, perhaps brought on by the difficult 1954. His overthrow followed the 10 October 1954 election which produced a deadlock in the Government of Honduras due to a split in the 39th President's own National Party of Honduras.

Despite this problem with his heart, once he was deposed out of office, Juan Manuel Galvez still managed to live a further 18 years before finally dying in Honduras on 20 August 1972.

Political offices
| Preceded by Tiburcio Carías Andino | President of Honduras; 1949–1954 | Succeeded by Julio Lozano Díaz |
