= Julio Lozano Díaz =

President of Honduras from 1954 to 1956

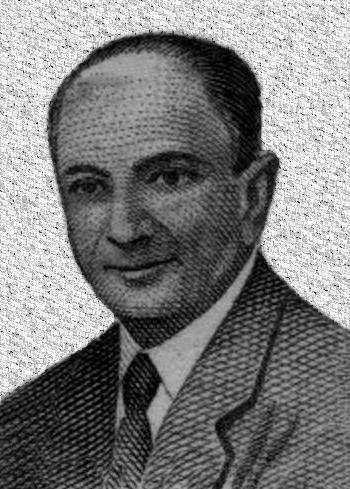

23rd President of Honduras (Supreme Head of State)
- In office 5 December 1954 – 21 October 1956
- Preceded by: Juan Manuel Galvez
- Succeeded by: Military Government Council (de facto); Ramón Villeda Morales (de jure)

Personal details
- Born: 27 March 1885 Tegucigalpa, Honduras
- Died: 20 August 1957 (aged 72) Miami, Florida, U.S.
- Party: National Party of Honduras
- Spouse: Laura Vigil de Lozano
- Profession: Accountant

Julio Lozano Díaz (27 March 1885 – 20 August 1957), was first Vice President of Honduras (1949–1954) and then President of Honduras, from 5 December 1954 until 21 October 1956.

He was born in Tegucigalpa, Honduras, and worked as an accountant for the Rosario Mining Company. He was Minister of Finance of Honduras from 1934 to 1936.

Lozano assumed presidential authority on 16 November 1954 while President Juan Manuel Gálvez was out of the country seeking medical attention. In December, citing a constitutional crisis over the stalemated presidential elections, he proclaimed himself the chief of state and he began instituting his own policies. Generally unpopular, and in ill health, Lozano was forced to resign by the military. He won a democratic election in 1956, but the result was deemed illegitimate and was annulled by the military junta.

Lozano Diaz died the following year in Miami, Florida, of cerebral thrombosis, complicated by pneumonia.

Political offices
Preceded by Juan Manuel Gálvez; Supreme Head of State	President of Honduras; 1954–1956	Succeeded by Honduran military junta of 1956–1957
