= Ramón Villeda Morales =

President of Honduras from 1957 to 1963

Ramon Villeda Morales
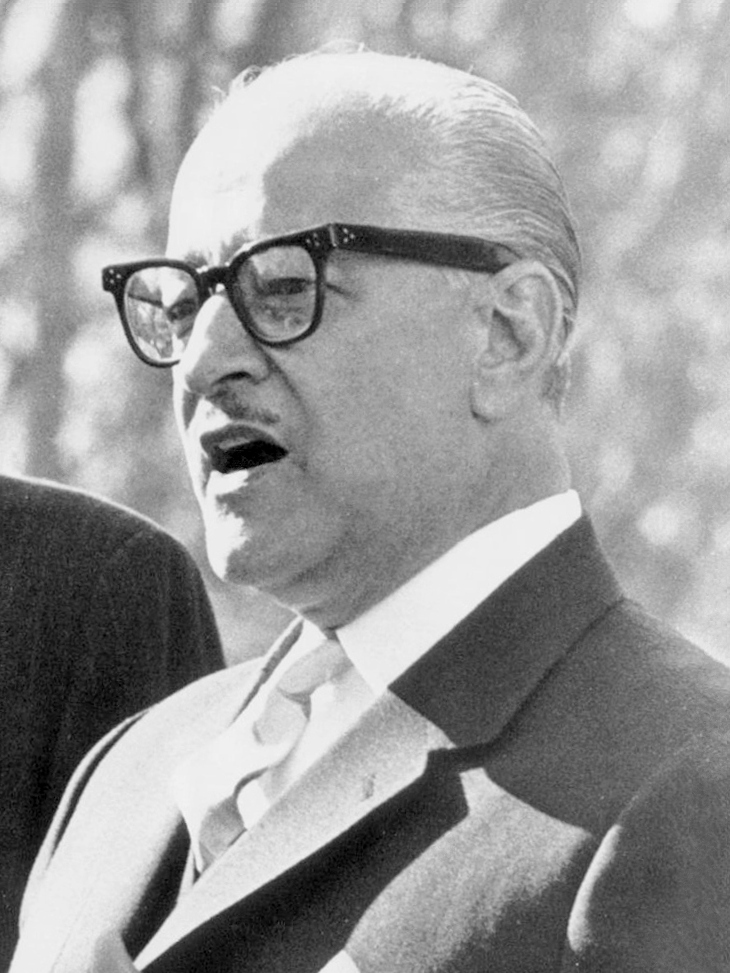
- Ramón Villeda Morales in 1962

24th President of Honduras
- In office December 21, 1957 – October 3, 1963
- Vice President: José Mejía Arellano
- Preceded by: Julio Lozano Díaz (de jure); Military Government Council (de facto)
- Succeeded by: Oswaldo López Arellano

Personal details
- Born: José Ramón Adolfo Villeda Morales; November 26, 1909 Ocotepeque, Honduras
- Died: October 8, 1971 (aged 61) New York City, United States
- Party: Liberal Party
- Spouse: Alejandrina Bermúdez Milla (1917–2012)
- Profession: politician, physician

José Ramón Adolfo Villeda Morales (November 26, 1909 – October 8, 1971) served as President of Honduras from 1957 to 1963.

== Biography ==
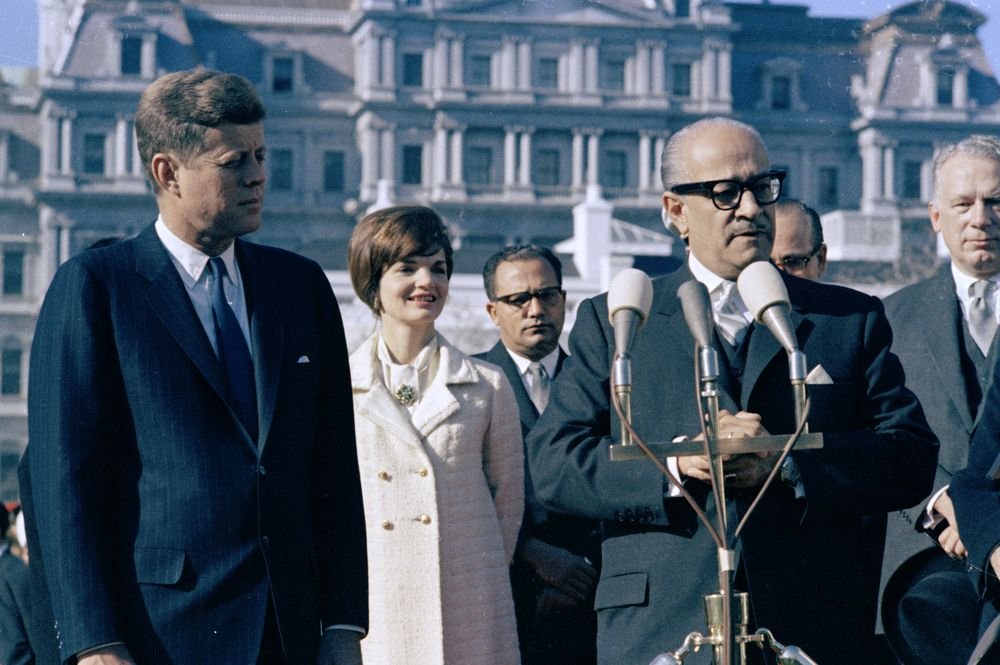
President Ramón Villeda Morales meeting with John F. Kennedy in 1962

Trained as a physician, his specialty was pediatrics. Villeda Morales was a liberal who supported the democratization of Honduras after a long period of military rule. He was the Liberal Party candidate in the 1954 presidential election, the first free election for over two decades, winning a plurality over a divided National Party but falling short of a majority. The deadlock led to a coup by Vice-President Julio Lozano Díaz. Following the military junta of 1955, he was in 1957 chosen by the country's constituent assembly to serve as president and oversee the transition to democracy. Villeda Morales immediately embarked on a campaign intended to help the poorer elements of society, introducing welfare benefits and enacting a new labor code that favored the country's large working class population. While these steps were popular with the masses, they enraged the traditional holders of power in Honduras: the military and the upper classes. When it seemed likely that the Liberal Party candidate, Modesto Rodas Alvarado, would win the 1963 election with an even stronger mandate to enact social reforms, the military responded with a coup, just ten days before the election was scheduled to take place.

Ramón Villeda Morales and his wife, Alejandrina, had six sons: twins Ramón and Ruben, Alejandro, Mauricio, Leonardo, and Juan Carlos.

Ramon Villeda Morales died of a heart attack on October 8, 1971, in New York City, where he was serving as the Honduran Ambassador to the UN. His widow, former First Lady of Honduras Alejandrina Bermúdez Milla, died on April 7, 2012, aged 94.

== Legacy ==
Villeda Morales helped modernize Honduras, and to create its public health, public education, and social security systems. He was a key supporter of the Alliance for Progress.

San Pedro Sula International Airport is named after him. His son Mauricio Villeda Bermúdez is a leader of the Liberal Party and was a candidate for the presidency in the 2013 elections.

== See also ==
- History of Honduras

Political offices
Preceded by Honduran military junta of 1956–1957	President of Honduras; 1957–1963	Succeeded by Oswaldo López Arellano
