= American School of Tegucigalpa =

- La Escuela Americana de Tegucigalpa

Location
- P.O. Box 2134, Tegucigalpa, Francisco Morazán; Honduras
- Coordinates: 14.094004°N 87.178418°W

Information
- Type: Private coeducational
- Motto: Excellence for All
- Established: 1946
- Faculty: 101
- Grades: Nursery-12
- Enrollment: 1,168
- Colours: Blue, Red, and White
- Mascot: Eagles
- Website: http://www.amschool.org

The American School of Tegucigalpa (or AST; Spanish: Escuela Americana de Tegucigalpa) is a private, coeducational international school located in the neighbourhood of Lomas del Guijarro, in Tegucigalpa, Honduras.

AST is accredited by the Secretaría de Educación de Honduras, the Southern Association of Colleges and Schools, and the International Baccalaureate Organization. The Honduran Ministry of Education grants the national degree of Bachillerato to students who comply with additional credits and earn 160 hours of community service.

== History ==
Circa 1946 many American-based companies established themselves in Honduras. The American Embassy saw the need for a bilingual school for the children of the families moving to this country to work in said companies. Mr. James Webb, the American Embassy Cultural Attaché, served as a liaison between these American families and a group of Honduran visionaries who were willing to invest in this project. This is how the first bilingual school, The American School of Tegucigalpa, came to be, located in Barrio La Ronda in downtown Tegucigalpa. The initial school had 42 students and three classrooms.

Now, the American School has grown and developed, including the Pre-School Building, Elementary Building, and High School Building.

== Sports ==
The American School of Tegucigalpa participates in both the AASCA (Association of American Schools of Central America) and ABSH (Association of Bilingual Schools of Honduras) tournaments.

These tournaments involve both women's and men's categories. Usually the American School of Tegucigalpa allows students to go to ABSH and AASCA from 7th grade to 12th grade.

The sports that the school participates in are soccer, basketball, track and field, tennis, volleyball, chess, and swimming.

AST's campus includes four FIBA-approved basketball courts, four professional volleyball courts, and one 90m x 68m artificial turf football field.

The campus also has a track and field track around the football field. All these facilities allow the school to host the AASCA and ABSH tournaments consistently.

== Notable alumni ==
- Rafael Leonardo Callejas, former President of Honduras
- Carlos Roberto Flores, former President of Honduras
- Mary Elizabeth Flores, his daughter. Former Permanent Representative of Honduras to the United Nations.
- Ricardo Maduro, former President of Honduras
- Francisco Herrera Alvarado, rector of Universidad Nacional Autónoma de Honduras (National Autonomous University of Honduras)
