= Tábora (surname) =

Tábora is a Spanish surname. As with other such surnames, it is often written without diacritics as Tabora.

== Notable people ==
- Benigno G. Tabora (1915–2008), Filipino-American veteran of both World War II and the Korean War
- Carlos Tábora (born 1965), Honduran footballer and manager
- Joel Tabora (born 1947), Filipino Jesuit priest and university president
- Krizziah Tabora (born 1991), Filipino bowler
- Marlon Tábora Muñoz (born 1969), Honduran politician and diplomat
- Rocio Tábora (born 1964), Honduran politician
