= William Chong Wong =

Honduran politician (died 2018)

Minister of Finance of Honduras
- In office 2010–2012
- President: Porfirio Lobo
- Preceded by: Gabriela Núñez
- Succeeded by: Héctor Guillén

Minister of Finance of Honduras
- In office 2004–2006
- President: Ricardo Maduro
- Preceded by: José Arturo Alvarado
- Succeeded by: Hugo Noé Pino

Personal details
- Born: Puerto Cortés, Honduras
- Died: June 17, 2018 Tegucigalpa, Honduras
- Party: National Party of Honduras

William Chong Wong (died June 17, 2018) was a Honduran economist, professor and politician. He twice served as Minister of Finance of Honduras, during the administrations of President Ricardo Maduro and President Porfirio Lobo Sosa. He was born in Honduras to Chinese immigrant parents and educated in Spain and the United States. He was a professor at Universidad Nacional Autónoma de Honduras and co-founded the Central American Technological University in 1987.

== Early life and education ==
Chong Wong was born in Puerto Cortés, Honduras, the eldest of five sons of two Chinese immigrants who had fled war-torn China in the 1940s. His father arrived in Honduras at the age of 28, via Hong Kong, the United States and Cuba. His mother arrived in 1947. He attended schools in Puerto Cortés and San Pedro Sula, before going to Spain to study chemical engineering. However, when his father died, he had to return to Honduras to help run the family's grocery store, as his mother spoke little Spanish. He later went to the United States to study economics and accounting.

== Career ==
After graduating from university, he worked in Tegucigalpa, the capital of Honduras, for the representative office of an American company. He started teaching at Universidad Nacional Autónoma de Honduras (UNAH) at age 21, and had a teaching career that lasted for 34 years. He later became a manager at the National Bank for Agricultural Development (BANADESA), beginning his career in the public sector. In 1987, he co-founded the Central American Technological University (UNITEC), where he served as a director and professor.

Chong Wong was appointed Minister of Finance of Honduras by President Ricardo Maduro in 2004. During his tenure he completed the negotiation with the Paris Club for the cancellation of external debt owed by Honduras. When Porfirio Lobo Sosa became President of Honduras in January 2010, Chong Wong was again appointed as Minister of Finance. However, during Honduras' negotiation with the International Monetary Fund (IMF) for a new aid agreement, IMF found that Honduras had failed to reach its deficit target in 2011. Chong Wong took responsibility and resigned in February 2012.

A week before his death in June 2018, Chong Wong was named as one of the 38 people implicated in a corruption case filed by MACCIH, the anti-corruption agency of the Organization of American States (OAS). The so-called "Pandora case" involved the alleged diversion of 282 million lempiras (about US$11.2 million) of public funds during the 2013 election campaign. He denied any wrongdoing.

== Personal life and death ==
Chong Wong was a Roman Catholic. He never married and had no children.

Chong Wong suffered from pancreatic cancer for the last two years of his life. He sought treatment in the United States and underwent chemotherapy. He died in Tegucigalpa on June 17, 2018, from respiratory arrest.
