= Sandra Midence =

Honduran politician

Sandra Regina de Midence is a Honduran politician, and was the President of the Central Bank of Honduras under the interim government of Roberto Micheletti. She was the deputy minister of finance from 1998 to 2000 under the presidency of Carlos Flores.

Political offices
Preceded by Gabriela Núñez	President of the Central Bank of Honduras (Acting); 2009-2010	Succeeded by Maria Elena Mondragón
