= Mary Flake de Flores =

Honduran former First Lady and political figure

Mary Carol Flake
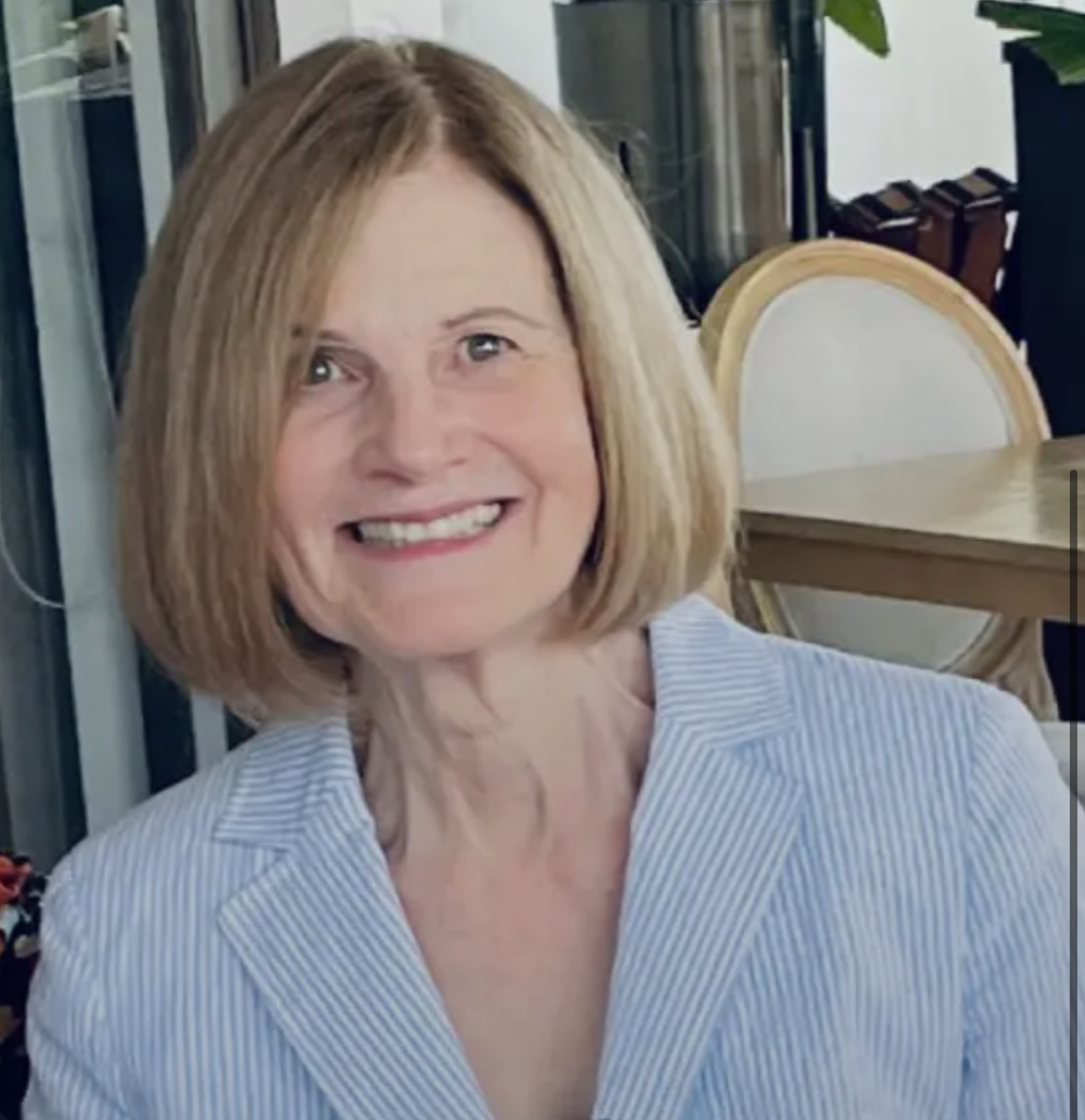

First Lady of Honduras
- In role 27 January 1998 – 27 January 2002
- President: Carlos Roberto Flores Facussé
- Preceded by: Bessy Watson
- Succeeded by: Aguas Santas Ocaña Navarro

Personal details
- Born: 25 September 1950 (age 75) United States
- Party: Liberal Party of Honduras
- Spouse: Carlos Roberto Flores Facussé

Mary Carol Flake de Flores (born September 25, 1950) is the former First Lady of the Republic of Honduras, wife of Carlos Roberto Flores Facussé, who was President from 1998 to 2002.

== Biography ==
Mary Carol Flake was born in Memphis, Tennessee, the eldest of seven children, and was raised in Cincinnati, Ohio. She earned a bachelor's degree in textiles and marketing from Louisiana State University, where she met Carlos Roberto Flores Facussé. They married in 1973 and have two children: Mary Elizabeth Flores, since 2010 the Permanent Representative of Honduras to the United Nations, and Carlos David Flores Flake.

Her husband became involved in politics in the 1970s and was elected president in the 1997 general election, serving from January 1998 to January 2002.

== As First Lady and after ==
As First Lady, Mary Flake de Flores was Honorary President of the Honduran Institute of Childhood and Family, participated in the Ninth Conference of Spouses of Heads of State and Government of the Americas, and participated in the summit of first ladies of Central America and the Inter-American Development Bank, to promote support for rural women. In 1998 she founded PROFUTURO, a project to build an interactive educational center and a children's museum of infancy. She is also the founder and honorary president of the Fundacion Hondura para el Niño con Cáncer (Honduran Foundation for Children with Cancer) and a member of the Board of Directors of the Honduran Institute of Interamerican Culture. She was Honorary President of the 1999 Special Olympics and keynote speaker at the 1999 National Congress for Women in Mexico City.

As founder and president of the non-profit Fundación María, she has organized and funded a new pediatric specialty hospital in Tegucigalpa, which began construction in 2000.

== Honors ==
- Nominated by the International Commission of Women for 1997 International Woman of the Year
- Medal of Merit of the Honduran Federation of Women Fellowship, for her humanitarian work during and after Hurricane Mitch, which severely damaged Honduras in October 1998.
- Caribbean Latin American Action Star of Caribbean Award, 1999
- 2000 Humanitarian Award of the Sabin Vaccine Institute

== Sources ==
- "Mary Flake de Flores (Biografía)", Office of the First Lady of Honduras, Tegucigalpa, 2000 (in Spanish)
