= Aguas Santas Ocaña Navarro =

First Lady of Honduras (2002–2006)

Aguas Ocaña

First Lady of Honduras
- In role 8 October 2002 – 27 January 2006
- President: Ricardo Maduro
- Preceded by: María Flores
- Succeeded by: Xiomara Castro

Personal details
- Born: Aguas Santas Ocaña Navarro; 23 April 1963 (age 62) Brenes, Seville, Spain
- Spouse: Ricardo Maduro (m. 2002; div. 2006)

Aguas Santas Ocaña Navarro (born 23 April 1963) is a former first lady of Honduras.

== Marriage and first lady ==
Ocaña Navarro was the wife of former President Ricardo Maduro, marrying him when he was already President in October 2002 after meeting him during a 2-year stint working in the Spanish embassy in Tegucigalpa. She received dual Spanish-Honduran citizenship in 2004. Her marriage to Maduro ended in divorce in 2006 as Maduro's term in office came to a close.

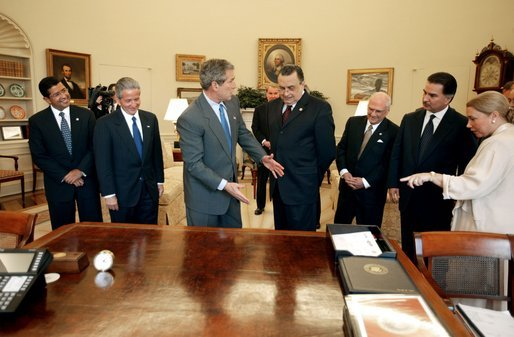
On the right, with Maduro (second from left) and Presidents of Central America and the United States, on May 12, 2004.

== Working with and adoption of children ==
In January 2003, Aguas Santas visited El Hogar de Niños Emanuel in San Pedro Sula, along with several executives of Spanish corporations operating factories in that city. They were hoping to raise awareness for the orphans remaining in many orphanages as a result of Hurricane Mitch, which had devastated Honduras in 1998.

She legally adopted two children, but she now has 13 children in her care, all of whom accompanied her to Nicaragua on 27 January 2006, the day she ceased being first lady. She worked there with Nicaraguan children in need, and helped the wife of Nicaragua's then President, Enrique Bolaños. The five children legally adopted are called Leidy Jackeline, Kevin Josué, Francis, Joan and Jackie.

As first lady of Honduras she was particularly known for her work with Street children and visiting jailmates. She created a program, "Cero Niños en las Calles", which is geared towards eliminating children working in Honduras' streets. This program has been severely criticized by her husband's political opponents. Ocaña Navarro continues fighting for children's rights, by denouncing a U.S.-based organisation that was allegedly involved in the selling of adoptive children by using the internet to lure prospective clients.
