= Marlon Tábora Muñoz =

Honduran politician and diplomat

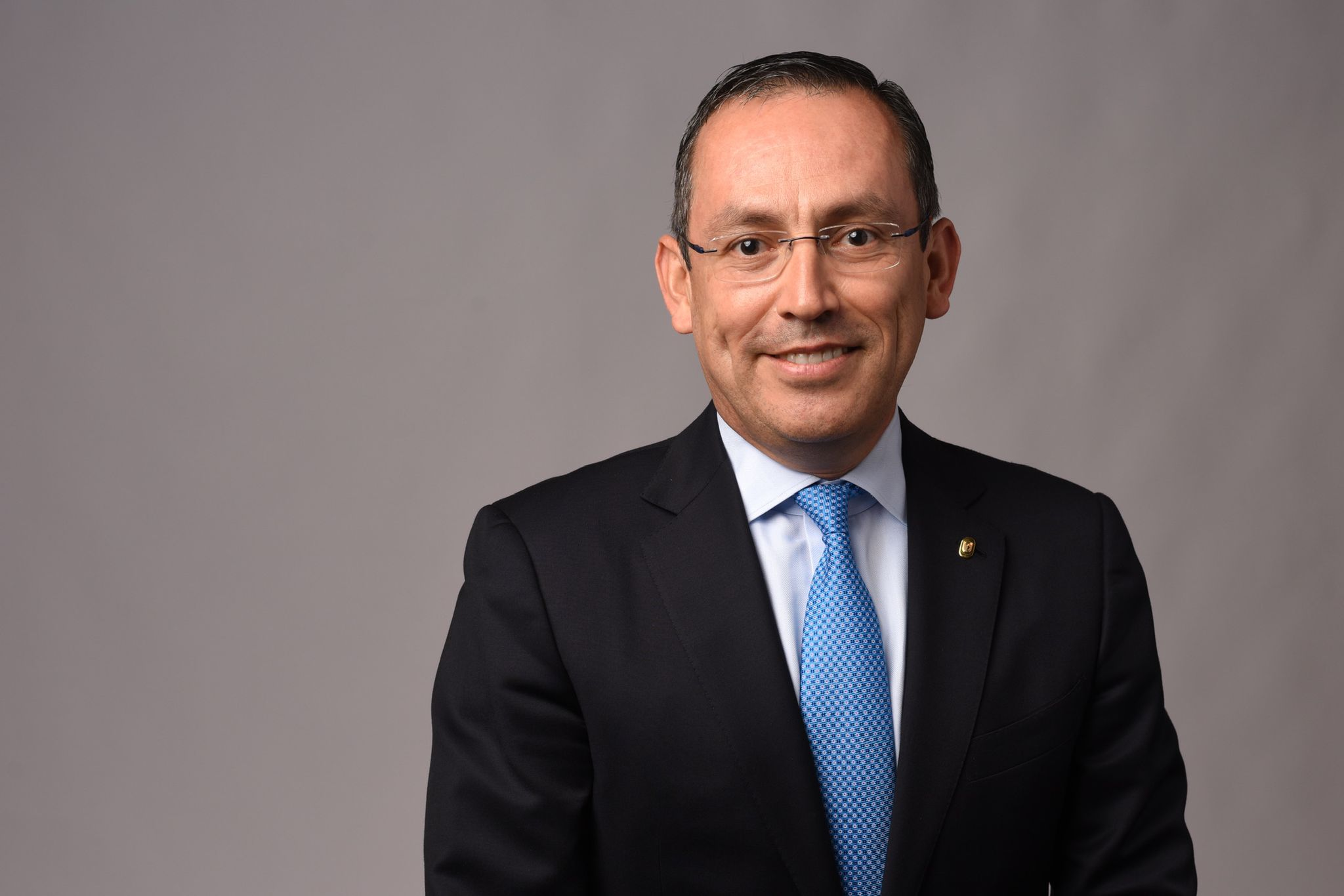

Honduras Ambassador to the United States
- In office 4 April 2017 – 15 August 2019
- Succeeded by: María Dolores Agüero
- In office 1 August 2015 – 3 April 2017

President of the Central Bank of Honduras
- In office 27 January 2014 – 31 July 2015
- President: Juan Orlando Hernández
- Preceded by: Maria Elena Mondragón
- Succeeded by: Manuel Bautista

Personal details
- Born: 3 April 1969 (age 57) Santa Rosa de Copán, Honduras
- Spouse: Saira Esmeralda Ponce
- Education: Universidad Nacional Autónoma de Honduras; Georgetown University McCourt School of Public Policy; Harvard University

Marlon Tábora Muñoz (born 3 April 1969, in Santa Rosa de Copán) is a Honduran politician and diplomat, has a PhD in economic sciences, and is a member of the National Party of Honduras. Previously Tábora has been Honduras Ambassador to the United States and also worked as Executive Director for Central América and Belize at the Inter-American Development Bank and Counselor Minister of Economic and Energy Affairs of the President Juan Orlando Hernández.

== Biography ==
=== Personal life ===
Marlon Tábora Muñoz was born on April 3 of 1969 in the city of Santa Rosa de Copán, in the western department of Copan. He is the only son of the marriage formed by the gentleman Jose Ernesto Tábora and Lady Hilda Muñoz Tábora. His primary education was at the school Jose Maria Medina of Santa Rosa de Copán. Afterward, he moved to the capital of the republic, Tegucigalpa; where he continued his studies and graduated from Instituto Salesiano San Miguel with a Bachelor of Science (Bachiller en Ciencias y Letras) in 1985.
Tábora is married to Saira Esmeralda Ponce and has two children, Marlon Andrés and Isabella.

=== Academics ===
He studied at the Universidad Nacional Autónoma de Honduras where he obtained an Industrial Mechanical Engineer degree with academic excellence in 1989. He obtained a master's degree in International Businesses from the Universidad Tecnológica Centroamericana (UNITEC) in 1994 and his doctorate in the Sciences of Administration at the Catholic University of Honduras (UNICAH) in 1999, both with honors summa cum laude. Later, he completed a master's in Administration of Public Politics in the McCourt School of Public Policy (MSPP) of Georgetown University (before GPPI) and postgraduate studies of Public Administration in Kennedy School of Government and AMP of Harvard Business School.

=== Professional and political path ===
Tábora has worked roughly equally in the public sector and the private sector. In March 2002, Tábora was appointed by President Ricardo Maduro, as President of the National Commission of Telecommunications (CONATEL), where he led the reform and opening of telecommunications sector in Honduras. While at the head of CONATEL, Tábora chaired the Commission of Telecommunications of Central América (COMTELCA).

Between 2005 and 2006, Tábora worked as a consultant for the Economic Commission for Latin America and the Caribbean (CEPAL), where he managed the process leading to the adoption of a new Competition Law in Honduras.

In November 2009, Tábora was elected as first acting deputy of the National Party in the Francisco Morazán Department, where he requested a license to be able to incorporate as part of the executive branch.

Tabora was nominated in January 2010 by President Porfirio Lobo as Minister Chief of Staff and Vice-Minister of the Presidency, charge that held until June of that year, date in which it's nominated to be representative of Honduras in front of the Inter-American Bank of Development (BID) where he becomes Alternate Executive Director for Central America and Belize.

In December 2013, the recently elected President Juan Orlando Hernandez nominates him as President of the Central Bank of Honduras and Chief of the Economic Cabinet charge that assumes on 27 January 2014. During his management at the head of the economic cabinet, Tábora led successfully the process of negotiation of a three years agreement of Honduras with the IFM in 2014 and the improvement of the country's Credit Ratings in 2015. In December 2014, the magazine Strategy and Businesses nominated it like one of the 100 more influential characters of the Central American region, under the nickname “The Man of the Figures”. In February 2015 Tabora assumed as President of the Monetary Council Centroamericano (CMCA).

In January 2016, Forbes magazine included him on the list of the 25 most influential figures in Central America.

== Publications ==
- Competencia y regulación de las Telecomunicaciones en el caso de Honduras
- Condiciones generales de competencia en Honduras
- Competencia y regulación en la banca: el caso de Honduras

== See also ==
- Central Bank of Honduras
- Inter-American Development Bank
- "Most widely held works by Marlon Tábora". WorldCat.
