= Rebeca Santos =

Rebeca Santos may refer to:

- Rebeca Santos (economist)
- Rebeca Santos (boxer)
