= Altia Business Park =

Coordinates: 15.5617°N 88.0214°W

Altia Business Park is a high tech industrial park located in San Pedro Sula adjacent to the Central American Technological University, Honduras. The park provides infrastructure and technological services for companies such as call centers, business process outsourcing, back office services and telemarketing, as well as base of operations for regional corporate offices. The park was developed by Grupo Karims and contains six parts, Technology and Business Park, Unitec - University of the Laureate International System of Maryland, the recreation zone called Rec-Zen, the retail centre Altara, Altia Medical Center, and Altia Residences.
