= Ministry of Finance (Honduras) =

Logo

The Ministry of Finance of Honduras is responsible for the public finance policies of Honduras. The ministry was created after the first constitution of Honduras was adopted in 1825.

== Ministers of Finance ==
- Casto Alvarado, ?-1841-1847
- José María Rojas, 1848-1849
- José María Rugama, 1850
- José Antonio Milla, 1852-1854
- José María Cacho, 1854-1855
- José María Rojas, 1856-1858
- Florencio Xatruch, 1858-1859
- Pedro Alvarado, 1859-1860
- Manuel Colindres, 1860-1862
- Coronado Chávez, 1862
- Lucas Ríos, 1862
- Francisco Alvarado, 1862
- José Meza, 1863-1864
- Pedro Alvarado, 1864
- Mariano Alvarez, 1865
- Saturnino Bográn, 1865
- Crescencio Gomez, 1865
- Saturnino Bográn, 1866-1868
- José María Rojas, 1868-1869
- Francisco Alvarado, 1869-1870
- Carlos Madrid, 1870
- Marcial Vijil, 1871
- José María Bustamante, 1871
- Rafael Padilla, 1871
- Juan N. Venero, 1872
- Mariano Rubi, 1873
- Esteban Ferrari, ?-1875
- Francisco Alvarado, 1875-1876
- Abelardo R. Zelaya, 1880
- Miguel R. Dávila, 1898
- José M. Muñoz, 1898
- Camilo F. Duron, 1902
- D. Fortín H., 1903
- Saturnino Medal, 1904
- Silverio Lainez, 1924
- Ramón Alcerro Castro, 1929-?
- Julio Lozano Díaz, 1934-1936
- Armando Flores F., 1936
- Héctor Caraccioli, 1936-1937
- Urbano Quezada, 1943-1946
- Marco Antonio Batres, 1949-1954
- Pedro Pineda Madrid, 1955-1957
- Gabriel Mejia, 1957
- Jacinto Duron, 1957
- Marco Antonio Batres, 1957-1958
- Fernando Villar, 1958-1959
- Jorge Bueso Arias, 1959-1963
- Edgardo Dumas Rodríguez, 1963-1964
- Tomas Cáliz Moncada, 1964-1965
- Manuel Acosta Bonilla, 1965-1970
- Elio Ynestroza Moncada, 1971-1972
- Manuel Acosta Bonilla, 1973-1975
- Porfirio Zavala Sandoval, 1975-1978
- Rene Pineda Mejia, 1978
- Valentin Mendoza, 1979-1981
- Benjamin Villanueva Tabora, 1981-1982
- Arturo Corleto Moreira, 1982-1984
- Manuel Fontecha Ferrari, 1984-1985
- Rodolfo Matamoros Hernández, 1985-1986
- Efraín Bu Girón, 1986-1989
- Carlos Falk, 1989
- Benjamin Villanueva Tabora, 1990-1993
- René Ardón Matute, 1993-1994
- Juan Francisco Ferrera López, 1994-1998
- Gabriela Núñez, January 1998-January 2002
- José Arturo Alvarado, 2002-2004
- William Chong Wong, 2004-2006
- Hugo Noé Pino, 2006
- Rebeca Santos, July 2006-June 2009
- Gabriela Núñez, 2009-2010
- William Chong Wong, 2010-2012
- Héctor Guillén, 2012
- Wilfredo Cerrato, 2012-2018
- Rocío Tábora, 2018-2020
- Marco Midence, 2020-2021
- Luis Mata Echeverrí, 2021-2022
- Rixi Moncada, 2022-2024
- Marlon David Ochoa Martinez, 2024
- Christian Duarte, 2024-

== See also ==
- Finance ministry
- Economy of Honduras
- Government of Honduras
