= La Tribuna (Honduras) =

Honduran newspaper

- Type: Daily newspaper
- Format: Broadsheet
- Founded: 1976
- Headquarters: Tegucigalpa
- Website: http://www.latribuna.hn

La Tribuna is a Honduran newspaper owned by Honduran former president Carlos Roberto Flores.

== History ==
La Tribuna was founded on 9 December 1976 by lawyer, writer and journalist Oscar Armando Flores Midence. Subsequently, Midence's son, Carlos Roberto Flores, became the president, chief executive officer and publisher of La Tribuna.
