= Rocío Tábora =

Honduran politician

Rocio Tábora

Minister of Finance of Honduras
- In office 2018–2020
- Preceded by: Wilfredo Cerrato
- Succeeded by: Marco Midence

Personal details
- Born: 2 July 1964

Isabel Rocio Tábora is the Honduran politician and cabinet minister.

She was born on 2 July 1964 in Santa Rosa de Copán. She was undersecretary of state in the office of the Presidency from 2002 to 2006 in the administration of Ricardo Maduro. She was the Minister of Finance and Economic Regulations from 2018 to 2020 in the cabinet of Juan Orlando Hernández.
