= Rebeca Santos (economist) =

Honduran economist (born 1963)

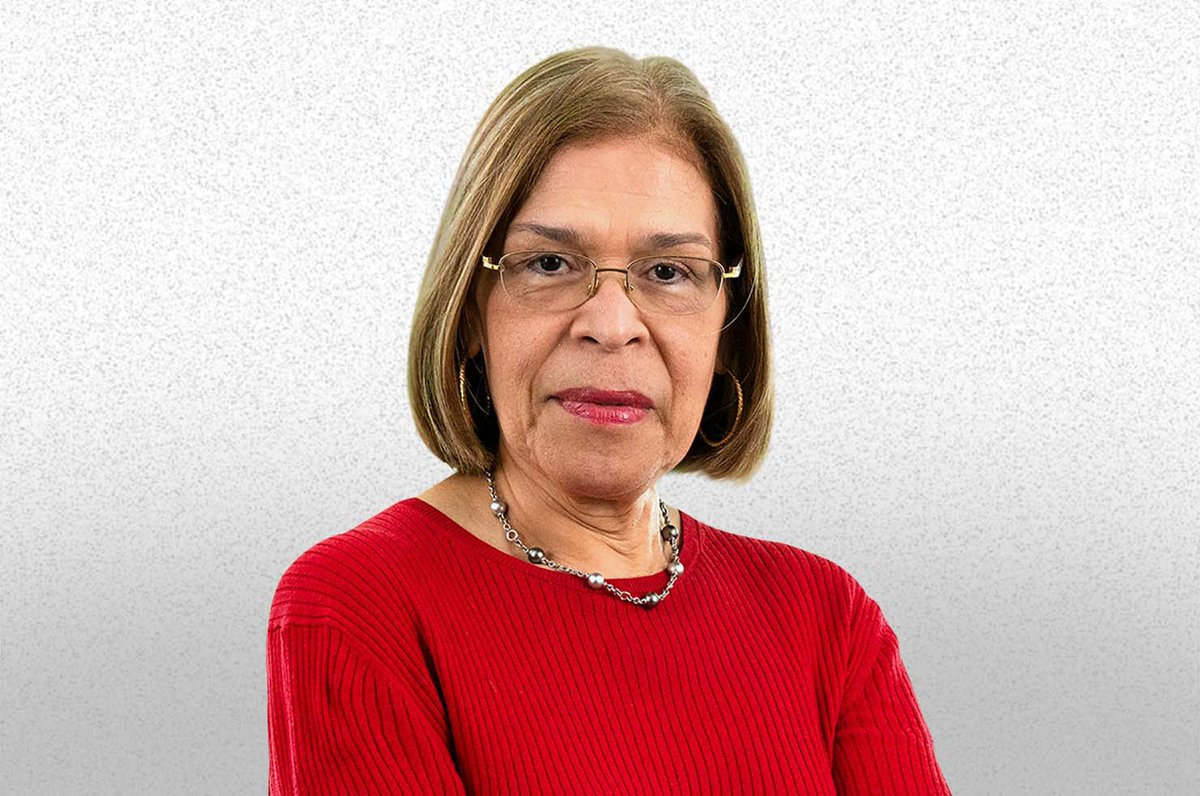

President of the Central Bank of Honduras
- In office January 27, 2022 – January 27, 2026
- Preceded by: Wilfredo Cerrato
- Succeeded by: Roberto Lagos

Minister of Finance of Honduras
- In office June 2, 2006 – June 28, 2009
- Preceded by: Hugo Noé Pino
- Succeeded by: Gabriela Núñez

Personal details
- Born: Rebeca Patricia Santos; 1963 (age 62–63) Tegucigalpa
- Education: Autonomus University of Honduras (BS)

Rebeca Patricia Santos (born 1963 in Tegucigalpa) is a Honduran economist. She is a former minister of finance and current president of the Central Bank of Honduras.

== Academic and work profile ==
Rebeca Santos holds a degree in Economics from the National Autonomous University of Honduras, a master's degree in Rural Development, and a postgraduate degree in Rural Development Planning.

She was governor for the Government of Honduras before the Inter-American Development Bank, World Bank and Central American Bank for Economic Integration, alternate governor before the International Monetary Fund, member of the Fiscal Dialogue Promotion Group, composed of former finance ministers and former presidents of the Central Bank of Honduras.

== Minister of Finance ==
She was Minister of Finance from January 27, 2006 until June 28, 2009, when the government of President Manuel Zelaya was ousted in a coup d'état.

== See also ==
- List of female finance ministers
- Economy of Honduras
- Central Bank of Honduras
