= SV Yankee Clipper =

Windjammer cruiseship

History
- Name: 1927–1938: Cressida; 1938–1938: Crimper; 1938–1942: Pioneer; 1942–1946?: El Cano (IX-79); 1946?–1965: Pioneer; 1965–present: Yankee Clipper
- In service: 1927–2007
- Out of service: 2007
- Identification: IMO number: 8845872
- Status: Laid up

General characteristics
- Type: Cruise ship
- Tonnage: 327
- Length: 197 ft
- Beam: 30 ft
- Draft: 17 ft
- Crew: 30
- Notes: Permanently docked in Trinidad

Yankee Clipper is a three masted sailing cruise ship that served for Windjammer Barefoot Cruises. She was originally built in Kiel, Germany as the Cressida, an armor plated private yacht. She was a prize in World War II. She was acquired by the Vanderbilts and was renamed Pioneer. In 1965, the ship was acquired by Windjammer Barefoot cruises.

== Cabins ==
Yankee Clipper has five different cabin types; Standard cabin junior, standard cabin, deck cabin, captain's cabin, and admiral suite.

== Out of service ==
When the Yankee Clipper's owner, Windjammer Barefoot Cruises went out of business in 2007, the ship retired and has been permanently docked in Trinidad.
