= Central Bank of Honduras =

Monetary Authority of Honduras

Central Bank of Honduras Banco Central de Honduras

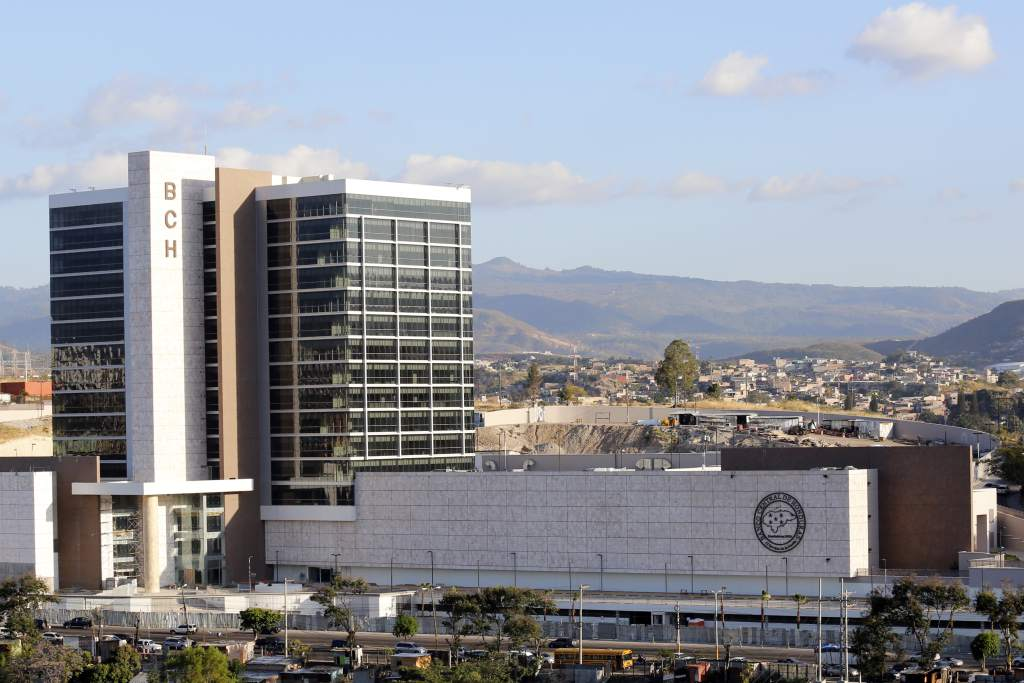
- Centro Civico, Headquarters of the Central Bank
- Central bank of: Honduras
- Headquarters: Tegucigalpa, Honduras
- Established: July 1, 1950
- Ownership: 100% state ownership
- President: Roberto Lagos Mondragon
- Currency: Honduran lempira HNL (ISO 4217)
- Reserves: 3 600 million USD
- Website: www.bch.hn

The Central Bank of Honduras (Spanish: Banco Central de Honduras) is the central bank of Honduras, established in 1950. The president of the bank is appointed by President of Honduras for a term of four years. The current bank president is Roberto Lagos Mondragon.

== History ==
The Central Bank of Honduras was created under Legislative Decree No. 53 on 3 February 1950 and commenced operations on 1 July of that year, with Roberto Ramírez serving as its first head. The opening ceremony was presided over by President Juan Manuel Gálvez.

The institution was created to centralise the issuance of currency and to oversee the country’s monetary, exchange, and credit policies. Its establishment followed earlier economic developments in Honduras, including the adoption of the lempira as the national currency in 1926 and its introduction into circulation in the 1930s. Before the creation of the Central Bank, financial activity in the country was limited, with only a small number of banks operating in major cities such as Tegucigalpa, San Pedro Sula, and La Ceiba.

The bank's founding enabled the nationalisation of the means of payment and provided a framework for the implementation of coordinated monetary policy. Under its founding legislation, the Central Bank became the sole issuer of legal tender in Honduras and assumed responsibility for maintaining monetary stability.

In 1975, a commemorative medal was issued to mark the bank's 25th anniversary.

In 1996, the National Congress approved reforms to the Central Bank law through Decree No. 228-96, aimed at modernising the institution and adapting its functions to evolving financial market conditions. Subsequent amendments have focused on strengthening the bank’s autonomy and reinforcing its role as the country’s principal monetary authority.

== Presidents ==
Name	Took office	Left office
Roberto Ramírez Ordóñez	1950	1971
Alberto Galeano	1971	1975
Guillermo Bueso	May 1975	July 1979
Práxedes Martínez Silva	August 1979	February 1982
Gonzalo Carías	March 1982	January 1990
Ricardo Maduro	February 1990	January 1994
Hugo Noé Pino	February 1994	February 1998
Emin Barjum Mahomar	February 1998	June 1999
Victoria Asfura de Díaz	June 1999	January 2002
Maria Elena Mondragón	January 2002	January 2006
Gabriela Núñez	January 2006	January 2008
Edwin Araque Bonilla	January 2008	June 2009
Sandra Midence	July 2009	January 2010
Maria Elena Mondragón	January 2010	January 2014
Marlon Tábora Muñoz	January 2014	July 2015
Manuel de Jesús Bautista	January 2016	January 2018
Wilfredo Cerrato	January 2018	January 2022
Rebeca Santos	January 2022	January 2026
Roberto Lagos Mondragon	January 2026	Incumbent

== See also ==
- List of central banks
