= Gabriela Núñez =

Honduran politician

Gabriela Núñez Ennabe, Congresswoman and President of the Budget and Finance Committee, was twice Minister of Finance of Honduras under the interim government of Roberto Micheletti. She had previously been Minister of Finance from 1998 to 2002, under the government of Carlos Flores and President of the Central Bank during 2006–2007. She was at the board of directors at the IADB, Washington, D.C., 1994–96. She has been an independent international consultant to the World Bank and the IADB. 2010–2011.

In the private sector she was Vice-President of Banco Atlántida and was a member of the board of directors of the Asociación de Instituciones Bancarias of Honduras. She is a member of Inter-American Dialogue.

== Background ==
Nuñez holds a 1984 Degree in Economics from Universidad Nacional Autónoma de Honduras and received a Fulbright scholarship for her Master in International Economics at the University of New York at Albany in 1989.

== Career ==
From 1985 to 1994 Nuñez was a Financial Analyst at the Central Bank of Honduras, and from 1993 to 1995, Technical Secretary of the Economic Cabinet, UDAPE.

From 1995 to 1996, Nuñez was Undersecretary of Finance, and from 1996 to 1998, Honduras' Representative of the Executive Board, at the Inter-American Development Bank (IADB), and Governor to IADB, International Monetary Fund and World Bank.

From 1998 to 2002 she was Honduras' Minister of Finance, during which period she was particularly known for playing an important role in managing the country's external debt in having Honduras successfully being included in the Heavily Indebted Poor Countries Initiative. In 1999, CNN/Time placed her among 50 Latin American Leaders for the New Millennium. The World Economic Forum awarded her the recognition of Global Leaders for Tomorrow.

She was a professor at UNAH 1984–2000 and currently a faculty member of UNITEC since 2009.

in July 2009, Nuñez accepted the responsibility of acting as Minister of Finance

She holds a very active leadership in her Liberal Party. In 2005, she ran as Presidential Candidate during primary elections

Political offices
Preceded by Rebeca Santos	Minister of Finance of Honduras (Acting); 2009–2010	Succeeded by William Chong Wong
Preceded by Juan F. Ferrera	Minister of Finance of Honduras; 1998–2002	Succeeded by José Arturo Alvarado
