= Marlon Ochoa =

Honduran politician (born 1991)

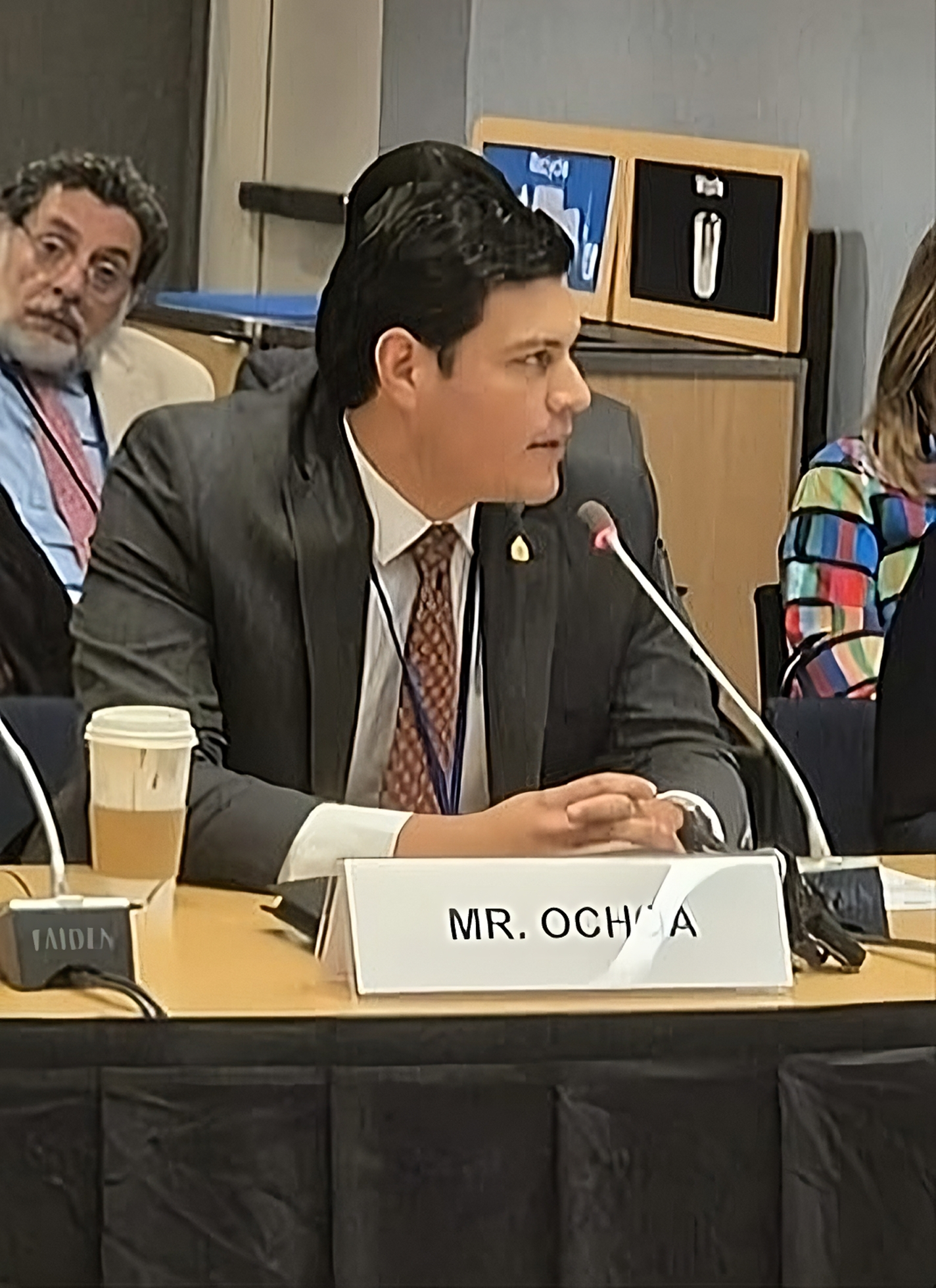
- Ochoa in 2024

Minister of Finance
- In office 6 January 2024 – 10 September 2024
- President: Xiomara Castro
- Preceded by: Rixi Moncada
- Succeeded by: Christian Duarte

Personal details
- Born: 16 December 1991 (age 34)
- Party: Liberty and Refoundation

Marlon David Ochoa Martínez (born 16 December 1991) is a Honduran politician serving as a member of the National Electoral Council since 2024. From January to September 2024, he served as minister of finance.
