= Fantome (schooner) =

1927–1998 sailing ship

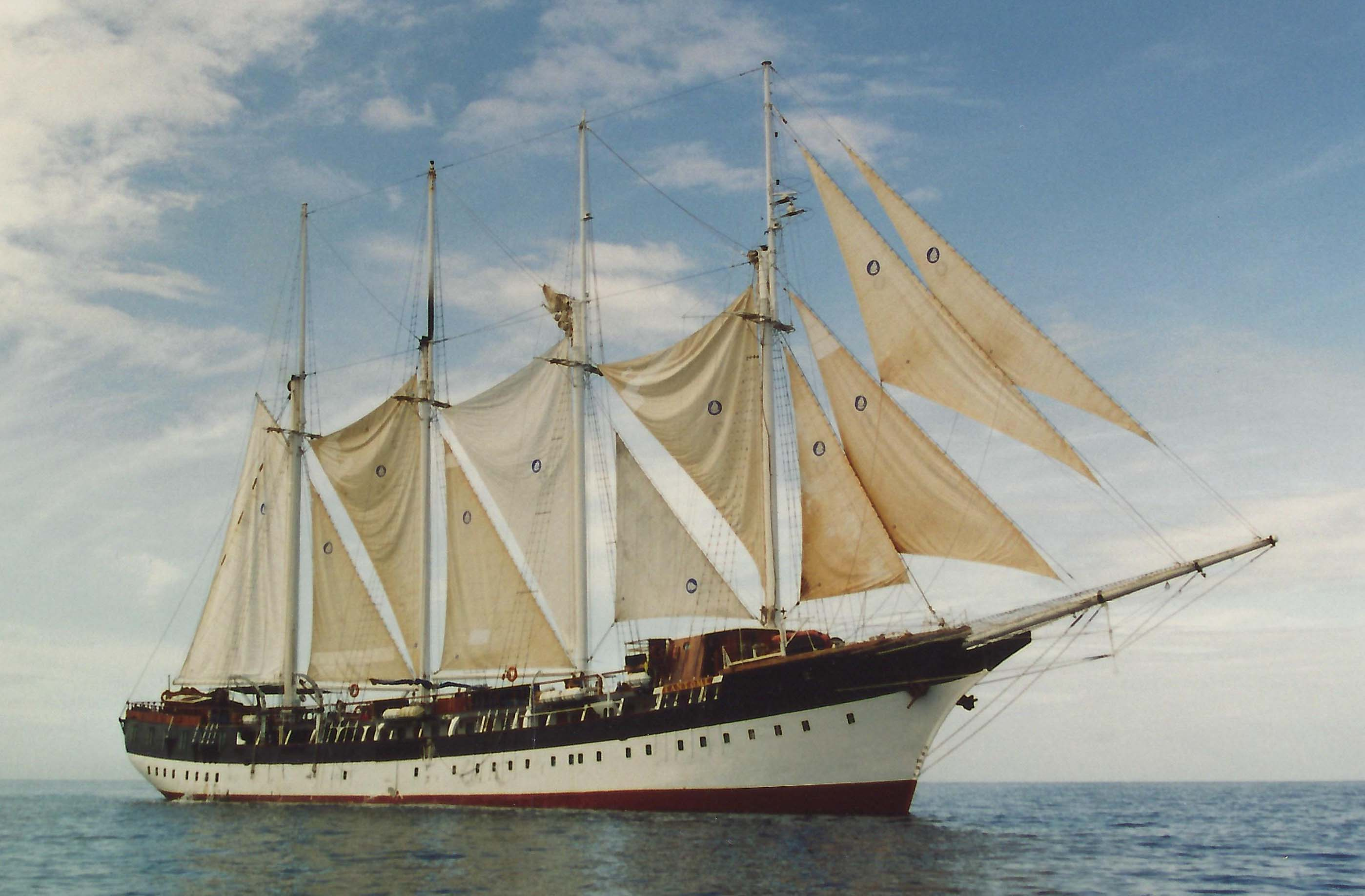
- Fantome off of Dominica

History
- Owner: Duke of Westminster (1927–c.1930); Nelson B. Warden (1932-1937); Aristotle Onassis (1956–1969); Windjammer Barefoot Cruises (1969–1998)
- Launched: 1927
- Completed: 1927
- Identification: IMO number: 8845860
- Fate: Lost at sea in Hurricane Mitch during October 1998

General characteristics
- Type: Staysail Schooner
- Tonnage: 679 tons

Fantome was a 679-ton staysail schooner. It was completed in 1927 by the Duke of Westminster. It was purchased by Windjammer Barefoot Cruises in 1969, and became the flagship of their fleet, offering cruises in the Caribbean and the Bay of Honduras.

Fantome was lost in October 1998 during Hurricane Mitch.

== Early years ==
Fantome was originally ordered for the Italian navy but was purchased before completion by the Duke of Westminster, who finished it as a yacht (launched in 1927). Westminster used it only four years before it changed hands twice in short order. First sold to Nelson B. Warden of Philadelphia and latter acquired by the Irishman Ernest Guinness, a senior member of the Guinness family, and rename Fantôme like the Fantome II, now named the Belem.

It was in the Pacific in the late 1930s and when war broke out in Europe in 1939, it was in Alaskan waters. Reluctant to cruise further or return to Ireland, Guinness elected to lay it up in Seattle for the duration of hostilities. At the end of the war it was stranded in Portage Bay for 14 years, barred by King County from sailing pending the payment of back taxes.

== Windjammer ==
In 1969, Windjammer owner and founder Michael Burke flew to Greece to purchase the schooner directly from Aristotle Onassis. He bought it, sight unseen, in exchange for a freighter. Windjammer then set about refurbishing Fantome, which became the flagship of their fleet of six vessels.

== Loss ==
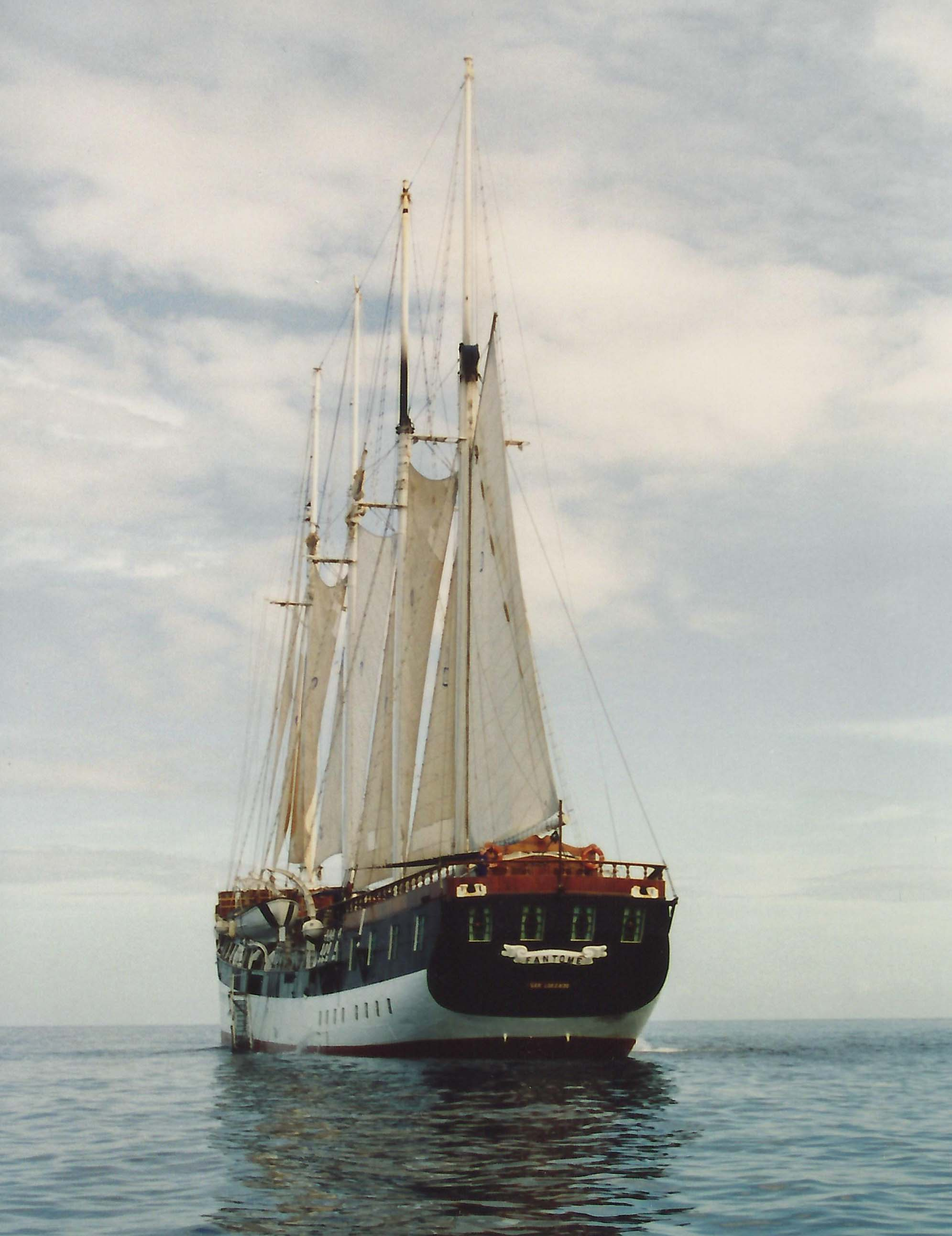
Fantome in 1993

On 24 October 1998, Fantome departed the harbor of Omoa, Honduras for a planned six-day cruise. Hurricane Mitch, then over 1,000 miles (1,600 km) away in the Caribbean Sea, was expected to pose a risk to Jamaica and possibly the Yucatán Peninsula. Captain Guyan March decided to play it safe by heading for the Bay Islands and waiting for the storm to pass.

By dawn on the following day, however, Mitch seemed to change course. Fantome immediately changed course for Belize City, where it disembarked all of her passengers and non-essential crew members. The schooner then departed Belize City, first heading north towards the Gulf of Mexico, in order to outrun the storm. Storm predictions proved extremely difficult, as the steering currents in Hurricane Mitch were very weak. When word reached Fantome that Mitch would most likely hit the Yucatán before the schooner could get out of harm's way, March changed course for the south. It was too early to know that he was heading directly into the storm's path.

The plan was to make for the lee side of the island of Roatan. In case Mitch made landfall in the Yucatán or Belize, by being on the southern side of the island, it would provide the schooner with enough protection to hopefully keep it from getting damaged by large swells and high winds. However Mitch, now a Category 5 hurricane with winds up to 180 mph (285 km/h), took a jog towards the south, directly towards Roatan.

As Mitch moved in on Roatan and Honduras, Fantome made one desperate attempt to flee to safety, now heading east towards the Caribbean. Mitch's forward motion picked up, though, and Fantome was unable to outrun the storm. Around 4:30 p.m. on 27 October 1998, with Mitch having weakened but still at Category 5 intensity, Fantome reported that they were fighting 100-mile-per-hour (160 km/h) winds in 40-foot (12 m) seas. They were just 40 miles (64 km) south of Mitch's eyewall. Radio contact was lost with Fantome shortly after that.

On 2 November, a helicopter dispatched by the British Type 22 Frigate HMS Sheffield discovered life rafts and vests labeled "S/V Fantome" off the eastern coast of Guanaja. It was all that was found of Fantome. All 31 crew members aboard perished and a memorial service was held for them on December 12, 1998.

== See also ==
- Belem (ship)
- Bounty (1960 ship)
