= Rixi Moncada =

Honduran politician (born 1965)

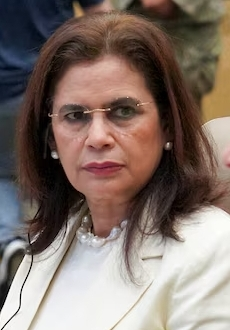

Minister of National Defense
- In office 1 September 2024 – 27 May 2025
- President: Xiomara Castro
- Preceded by: José Zelaya
- Succeeded by: Xiomara Castro (acting)

Minister of Finance
- In office 27 January 2022 – 3 January 2024
- President: Xiomara Castro
- Preceded by: Luis Mata
- Succeeded by: Marlon Ochoa

Minister of Labor and Social Security
- In office 27 January 2006 – 27 January 2008
- President: Manuel Zelaya
- Preceded by: German Leitzelar
- Succeeded by: Mayra Mejía

Personal details
- Born: 13 February 1965 (age 61) Comayagua, Comayagua Department, Honduras
- Party: Liberty and Refoundation
- Spouse: Enrique Arias
- Children: 3
- Education: Autonomous University of Honduras (BA)

Rixi Ramona Moncada Godoy (born 13 February 1965) is a Honduran lawyer and financier who served as Minister of National Defense from September 2024 until May 2025, becoming the first woman to hold the position. A member of the Liberty and Refoundation party, she previously served as Minister of Finance from 2022 to 2024, member of the National Electoral Council from 2019 to 2022 and Minister of Labor and Social Security from 2006 to 2008. She was a presidential candidate in the 2025 general election and received 19.2% of the vote.
