= Marco Midence =

Honduran politician

Marco Antonio Midence Milla

Minister of Finance
- In office 20 August 2020 – 25 May 2021
- President: Juan Orlando Hernández
- Preceded by: Rocío Tábora
- Succeeded by: Luis Fernando Mata

Personal details
- Born: 25 September 1984 (age 42) La Ceiba, Honduras
- Party: National Party of Honduras
- Education: Universidad Católica de Honduras (BA); INCAE Business School (MBA); Harvard Kennedy School (MPA)

Marco Midence (born September 25, 1984 in La Ceiba) is a Honduran politician and government minister. He was the Minister of Finance from 2020 to 2021.

Political offices
Preceded by Rocío Tábora	Minister of Finance; 2020-2021	Succeeded by Luis Fernando Mata
