= Windjammer Barefoot Cruises =

American leisure cruise line

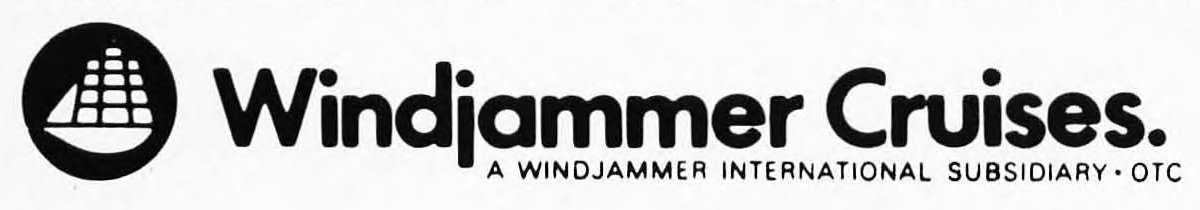

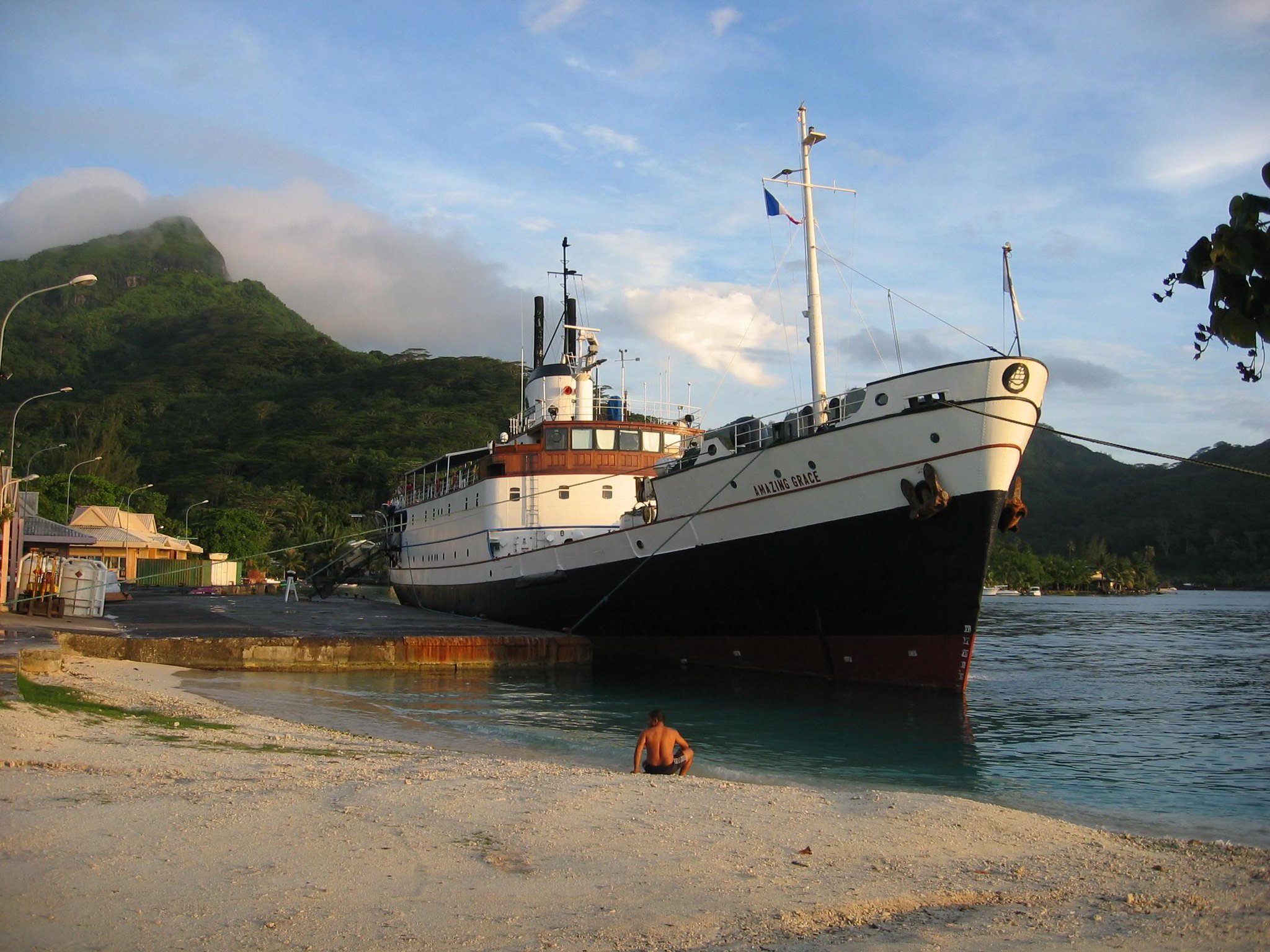
- Company type: Cruise line
- Industry: Transportation
- Founded: 1947
- Defunct: Services: 2007; Company: 2008
- Fate: Bankruptcy in late 2007, liquidation in September 2008
- Headquarters: Miami Beach, Florida
- Products: Cruises
- Website: windjammer.com

Windjammer Barefoot Cruises was a leisure cruise line based in Miami Beach, Florida. Founded in 1947 by Michael Burke, the company scheduled one and two week cruises in the Caribbean and Central America, using a fleet of sailing tall ships. The ships were former yachts and commercial vessels that were refurbished as cruise vessels, accommodating 60 to 100 paying passengers and 20 to 40 officers and crewmembers. The ships were refitted to resemble 19th century sailing vessels called windjammers.

Caribbean itineraries included the British Virgin Islands, French West Indies, Grenadines, the ABC islands and The Bahamas. Central American itineraries included Costa Rica, Panama, and Belize.

In September 2007, Windjammer's entire fleet was suspended from operating any further cruises. Although the company initially stated that it intended to resume service, no significant steps in that direction took place. Customers who were already booked on future cruises did not receive refunds from the canceled voyages. All remaining parts of the company that were still operating were shut down in April 2008. Later that year, the company's assets were auctioned off. The four ships in their fleet as of the shut-down were all laid up and were left in a neglected state of condition.

Michael Burke died in May 2013, aged 89.

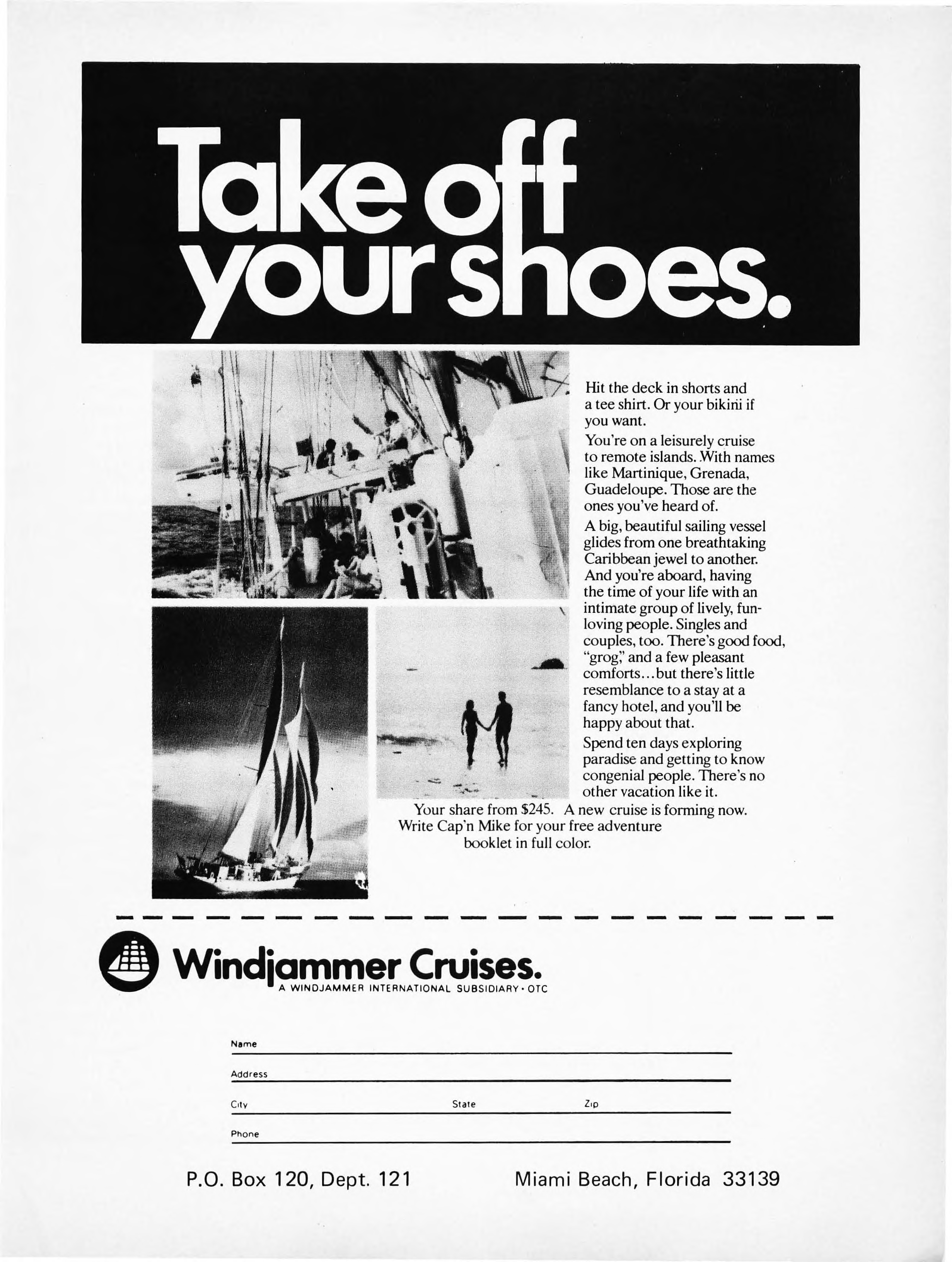
Advertisement from a 1975 issue of Byte

Active ships at the time the company shut down:

- S/V Legacy
- S/V Polynesia -- sold to Portuguese Navy
- S/V Mandalay
- S/V Yankee Clipper -- permanently docked in Trinidad

Retired ships:

- Brigantine Yankee (lost Cook Islands July 1964)
- S/V Yankee Clipper
- S/V Flying Cloud
- M/V Amazing Grace
- M/S Yankee Trader
- S/V Fantome (sunk in 1998)

== Issues ==
=== Loss of S/V Fantome ===
In October 1998, Hurricane Mitch was responsible for the loss of the S/V Fantome, a four-masted schooner operated by Windjammer. All 31 crew members aboard perished; passengers and other crew members had earlier been offloaded in Belize. The story was recorded in the book The Ship and The Storm by Jim Carrier (ISBN 0-07-135526-X). The ship, which was sailing in the center of the hurricane, experienced up to 50-foot (15 m) waves and over 100 mph (160 km/h) winds, causing the Fantome to founder off the coast of Honduras.

=== 2007 financial difficulties ===
According to reports in The Wall Street Journal and elsewhere, Windjammer had been in serious financial trouble since 2007 or earlier. The Journal article explained that crews had gone unpaid, and the fleet of ships was found to be in disrepair. There were also reports that cruise passengers had complained of being stranded, either aboard the ships or at intermediate destinations.

After ceasing operations for several weeks, the company planned to relaunch cruises on its fleet of ships, starting with s/v Legacy on November 3, 2007 followed by the other ships in the spring of 2008. (On April 27, 2010, the s/v Legacy was spotted tied up at Puerto Caldera, Costa Rica, in run-down condition). In a series of 2007 press releases, however, the company later canceled all sailings through January 2008. No further information has been distributed by the company since November 2007, and no cruises are currently scheduled. The last press release on their website was released on December 21, 2007.

The Florida Department of Agriculture and Consumer Services has received numerous complaints about Windjammer since its shutdown, because the company has not refunded prepaid fares for the canceled cruises. The Department has responded to these complaints with statements indicating that Windjammer is no longer in business.
