= Efraín Bu Girón =

Honduran politician

President of the National Congress of Honduras
- In office 25 January 1982 – 25 January 1986
- Preceded by: Roberto Suazo Cordova
- Succeeded by: Carlos Orbin Montoya

Personal details
- Born: 27 February 1924 Santa Bárbara Department, Honduras
- Died: 2 August 2004 (aged 80) Tegucigalpa, Honduras
- Party: Liberal Party
- Profession: Lawyer, Politician

Efraín Bu Girón (27 February 1924 – 2 August 2004) was a Honduran lawyer and politician from the Liberal Party of Honduras. He served as President of the National Congress of Honduras from 1982 to 1986. He was Minister of Finance of Honduras from 1986 to 1989.
