= Mary Elizabeth Flores =

Honduran politician

Mary Elizabeth Flores Flake
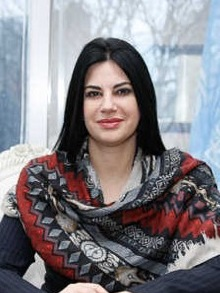
- Flores in 2017
- Born: Mary Elizabeth Flores Flake; 6 December 1973 (age 52); Tegucigalpa, Honduras
- Occupations: Politician, diplomat, lawyer

Mary Elizabeth "Lizzy" Flores Flake (born December 6, 1973) is a journalist, lawyer, politician and diplomat, the daughter of the former Honduran president Carlos Flores Facussé. Her mother is Mary Flake de Flores, who is American.

On January 25, 2006, Flores took office as vice-president of the National Congress of Honduras, representing the Liberal Party. In April 2010, she became Permanent Representative of Honduras to the United Nations.

Flores has two children.

== Early life and education ==
Flores is the daughter of Carlos and Mary Flores. Her father, Carlos Roberto Flores, was President of Honduras from 1998 to 2002.

Flores graduated with honors in 1997 with a bachelor's degree in Mass Communication from the College of Arts and Sciences in Loyola University, New Orleans, receiving the Kappa Tau Alpha award for excellence and high Academic standing in Journalism. Flores has a law degree from the National Autonomous University of Honduras in 2009 and is a member of the Honduran Bar Association.

== Career ==
From 1997 to 2006, Flores practiced Journalism in her family newspaper, La Tribuna, founded by her grandfather and father December in 1976, following upon a legacy of championing freedom of speech. She has produced periódicals and magazines in print and online, has served as a columnist for more than a decade, and created a weekly comic strip based on the newspaperboy symbol of the Newspaper called Tribunito, and the Tribuna family.

Flores was elected as a representative of the Liberal Party to the National Congress and public office with the highest percentage of votes in the country. She also became the youngest and the first woman to hold the position of the First Vice-President of the National Congress of the Republic of Honduras (2006-2010) presiding over Congressional debates and committee meetings, with Government Institutions, International community and civil society.

Flores presented her credentials to the Secretary-General Ban Ki-moon as the Ambassador of Honduras to the United Nations. Flores was chosen as the first female Ambassador of Honduras to the United Nations representing the Government of Unity and Reconciliation. After returning Honduras to full participation in all regional groups and forums, in 2012 was elected Vice-president of the United Nations General Assembly's 67th Session.

In January 2014, Flores was re-appointed by the government of President Juan Orlando Hernandez as Permanent Representative to the United Nations.

In addition to her ambassadorial responsibilities, Flores holds the position of Liaison between the United Nations Development Programme (UNDP) and the Honduran Government since 2014 working on Sustainable Development National Plan and Agenda.

From 2016- 2018, Flores served the president of the executive board of International Association of Permanent Representatives (IAPR) in New York.
