= Francisco Alvarado =

Francisco Alvarado was a noted playwright of zarzuela in Lineyte-Samarnon (Waray). He was a member and literary luminary of the Sanghiran san Binisaya organization which was founded in 1909 to cultivate the Waray language.

== Poetry ==
- Panhayhay hin Bungtohanon, 1921, Hinagpis ng Isang Taga-Bayan
- An Marol, 1925, Ang Sampagita
- Kaadlawon, 1925, Araw
- Kagab-ihon, 1925, Gabi
- Nihaga, 1930
- Pilipinas, 1931

== Anthologies ==
- Panulaan At Dulaang Leytenhon-Samarnon
- Jaime Biron Polo, Editor and translator
- Ateneo de Manila University Press, 1994
