= Permanent Representative of Honduras to the United Nations =

"Representative of Honduras to the UN"

- Representante Permanente de Honduras ante las Naciones Unidas
- Flag of the United Nations
- Honduran Ministry of Foreign Affairs
- Style: Her Excellency
- Appointer: President of Honduras
- Formation: December 17, 1945
- Website: http://www.un.int/wcm/content/site/honduras/

The Permanent Representative of Honduras to the United Nations (Spanish: Representante Permanente de Honduras ante las Naciones Unidas) is the Chief of Mission of the delegation of Honduras, and highest permanent representative of the Government of Honduras to the United Nations.

The official duty of the Honduran Permanent Representative, currently Mary Elizabeth Flores Flake, is to represent the interests of Honduras during all plenary meetings of the General Assembly in the absence of a senior officer (such as the Minister of Foreign Relations (Honduras) or the President of Honduras). Flake is also the first woman to be appointed as the Permanent Representative of the Honduran Mission, before the United Nations.

Ms. Flores has served as Vice-President of the National Congress of Honduras since 2006 and presides over sessions on national issues. She is also a leading figure in her country's politics, advocating for causes ranging from constitutional reforms, health and environmental initiatives, and energy conservation to issues of ethics, transparency, and human rights. She has spearheaded numerous social projects, including those directed towards the needy in the poverty-stricken areas of Honduras' capital, Tegucigalpa, and has invested in micro-financing programs for women in small businesses. Ms. Flores received her Bachelor of Arts degree in mass communication from the University of Loyola in New Orleans in 1997. She also obtained a law degree from Universidad Nacional Autónoma de Honduras in 2009.

Flake is also the daughter of former Honduran President Carlos Roberto Flores (1998–2002), and was born on December 6, 1973. She has two children.

The following is a chronological list of those who have held the office:

#	Ambassadors	Years served
1	Dr.Tiburcio Carias, Jr.	1950–1957
2	Marco Antonio Batres	Sept.1957–Dec.1957
3	Carlos Adrian Perdomo	1958–1960
4	Dr. Francisco Milla Bermudez	1960–1963
5	Policarpo Callejas	1964–1965
6	Humberto Lopez Villamil	1965–1969
7	F. Salomon Jimenez Munguia	1969-(Chargé)
8	Dr.Ramon Villeda Morales	Sept.1971-Oct.1971(Deceased)
9	R. Martinez Ordoñez	1971–1977
10	Mario Carias	1977–1982
11	Dr.Enrique Cortez Colindres	1982–1983
12	Dr. Roberto Herrera-Cacerres	1983–1986
13	J.R. Martinez-Ordoñez	1986–1987
14	Jorge R. Hernandez Alcerro	1987–1988
15	J.R. Martinez-Ordoñez	1988–1990
16	Roberto Flores Bermudez	1990–1992
17	Juan J. Cueva Membreño	1992–1994
18	Gerardo Martinez Blanco	1994-1998
19	Hugo Noé Pino	1998–1999
20	Angel E. Orellana Mercado	1999–2001
21	Manuel Acosta Bonilla	2002–2006
22	Ivan Romero Martinez	2006–2007
23	Jorge Arturo Reina Idiaques	2008–2010
24	Mary Elizabeth Flores	2010–2022
25	Carlos Roberto Aguilar Pineda	2022–Present
