= Hugo Noé Pino =

Honduran economist, diplomat and politician

Hugo Noé Pino is a Honduran economist, diplomat and politician from Liberty and Refoundation. He served as President of the Central Bank of Honduras from 1994 to 1997, as Permanent Representative of Honduras to the United Nations from 1998 to 1999, and as Minister of Finance in 2006. Pino has been First Vice President of the National Congress of Honduras from 25 January 2022 until 2025 or 2026.
