= Central American Technological University =

Private university in Honduras

- Universidad Tecnológica Centroamericana
- Type: Private University
- Established: August 22, 1987; 38 years ago
- President: Marlon Brevé Reyes
- Administrative staff: 360
- Undergraduates: 15,000
- Postgraduates: 2,000
- Location: Tegucigalpa, San Pedro Sula and La Ceiba, Honduras; 14°2′57.6″N 87°10′25.64″W
- Campus: Urban
- Website: www.unitec.edu

The Central American Technological University (Spanish: Universidad Tecnológica Centroamericana) (UNITEC) is a private coeducational institution with campuses in the three main cities of Honduras: Tegucigalpa, San Pedro Sula and La Ceiba.

== History ==
UNITEC (Central American Technological University) is a private higher education institution founded in 1987 by a group of Honduran businessmen and professors of Universidad Nacional Autónoma de Honduras (UNAH), including William Chong Wong, who envisioned the creation of an institute that had as its main focus the teaching of the sciences to its students without compromising their knowledge of the humanities.

This university also provides a choice of higher education to working adults through CEUTEC (Centre for Technological Development), which began operations in 2005.

In that same year UNITEC became a member of Laureate International Universities. However, it ceased to be part of the Laureate network in 2020.

Currently, UNITEC has five different campuses distributed in five major cities in Honduras, three in Tegucigalpa, one in San Pedro Sula and another in La Ceiba. It has over 17,000 university students nationwide.

== Academics ==
Its academic programs are focused on the contribution of professionals in the areas of business and engineering, some of them unique in Honduras offering 20 undergraduate programs and 8 master's programs.

== Agreements and relationships ==
Unitec has established agreements and close relationships with other universities and Institutions worldwide:

- Instituto Tecnológico y de Estudios Superiores de Monterrey (Monterrey Institute of Technology and Higher Learning), Mexico
- Universidad Nacional Autónoma de México (Mexico National Autonomous University), Mexico

Universidad del Valle de México (UVM), Mexico

- Universidad Politécnica de Madrid, (Madrid Politechnical University) Spain
- Escuela de Administración de Negocios para Graduados - ESAN- (School of Graduate Business Administration), Peru
- Centro de Investigación de Tecnología de Alimentos de la Universidad de Costa Rica (CITA-UCR) (National Research Center on Food Service of Costa Rica University), Costa Rica
- Escuela Superior de Economía y Administracion de Empresas (Graduate School of Economy and Business Administration), Argentina
- Universidad de Huelva (Huelva University), Spain
- Calvin College, Michigan, United States
- University of Miami, United States
- Louisiana State University, United States
- Instituto Tecnológico de Buenos Aires (Buenos Aires Institute of Technology), Argentina
- Rochester Institute of Technology, United States
- Universidad Central (Central University), Chile
- Universidad Diego Portales (Diego Portales University), Chile
- Universidad de Fortaleza (Fortaleza University), Brazil
- Universidad Torcuato di Tella (Torcuato di Tella University), Argentina
- Universidad del Salvador (University del Salvador), Argentina
- Universidad de Buenos Aires (Buenos Aires University), Argentina
- Universidad de Santiago de Chile (Santiago de Chile University), Chile
- Universidad Politécnica de Valencia (Valencia Politechnical University), Spain
- Universidad Autónoma de Barcelona (Barcelona Autonomous University), Spain
- Universidad Antonio de Nebrija (Antonio de Nebrija University), Spain
- Universidad Católica del Norte (Catholic University of the North), Chile
- Universidad Mayor (Major University), Chile
- Instituto Nacional de Tecnología Industrial (Industrial Technology National Institute), Argentina
- IAE Universidad Austral, Argentina
- Normandy Business School, France
- Institute of Industrial Engineers, United States
- Tompkins Cortland Community College, United States
- National Tsing Hua University, Taiwan
- Tamkang University, Taiwan
- Universidad de Caxias do Sul (Caxias do Sul University), Brazil
- Fundacao Universidade de Brasil (Foundation of Brazil Universities), Brazil
- Universidad de Cienfuegos Carlos Rafaél Rodríguez, Cuba

Since 2005 UNITEC Honduras is affiliated member of Laureate International Universities, they have a partnership with more than 100 institutions worldwide.
