= Carlos Roberto Flores =

33rd President of Honduras (1998-2002)

Carlos Flores
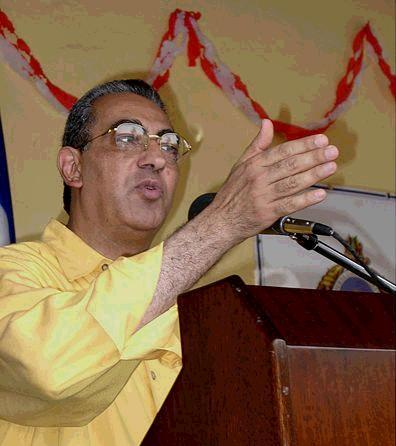
- Flores, c. 1998–2002

33rd President of Honduras
- In office 27 January 1998 – 27 January 2002
- Vice President: William Handal Raudales
- Preceded by: Carlos Roberto Reina
- Succeeded by: Ricardo Maduro

President of the National Congress
- In office 25 January 1994 – 25 January 1998
- Preceded by: Rodolfo Irías Navas
- Succeeded by: Rafael Pineda Ponce

Minister of the Presidency
- In office 1982–1984
- President: Roberto Suazo Córdova

Personal details
- Born: Carlos Roberto Flores Facussé; 10 March 1950 (age 76) Tegucigalpa, Honduras
- Party: Liberal Party of Honduras
- Spouse: Mary Flake de Flores
- Occupation: Politician, businessman

Carlos Roberto Flores Facussé (born 10 March 1950) is a Honduran politician and businessman who served as the 33rd President of Honduras from 27 January 1998 to 27 January 2002. A member of the Liberal Party, Flores was previously the President of the National Congress from 25 January 1994 to 25 January 1998.

== Background ==
Flores Facussé is the son of Honduran journalist Oscar Flores Midence and Margarita Facussé de Flores, and is of Palestinian descent. He is the nephew of Miguel Facussé Barjum. He, his brother Oscar Flores and his sister Celsa Flores, an artist, all attended the American School of Tegucigalpa. He then earned a dual degree in industrial engineering and international economics and finance from Louisiana State University. He became a member of Phi Iota Alpha.

Soon after completing his master's degree he returned to Honduras, where he began managing the family business (the newspaper La Tribuna) and participating in private and public committees, including the Honduran Central Bank and the Institute of Social Security.

== Political career ==
During the 1970s, Flores became involved in Honduran political life, joining the Liberal Party. He later became a congressman, representing the department (political division equivalent to a province) of Francisco Morazán. He served as Minister of the Presidency under the rule of Liberal president Roberto Suazo from 1982 to 1984.

In the 1989 general election he ran for the presidency, eventually losing to Rafael Leonardo Callejas, the candidate of the National Party.

In 1994, Flores became president of the National Congress, serving until 1998.

=== 1997 Honduran general election ===
Flores won the 1997 general election, defeating Nora Melgar Castro of the National Party. He served as president of Honduras from 1998 to 2002.

== Presidency (1998–2002) ==
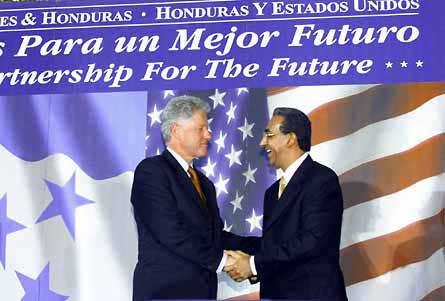
Carlos Flores with United States President Bill Clinton

During Carlos Flores' presidency, Honduras was struck by Hurricane Mitch, one of the worst natural disasters in decades. It caused thousands of deaths and left the national economy in shambles.

President Flores solicited international aid from several financial institutions and countries. The response was strong, and funds were directed at reinforcing Honduras' infrastructure and the agricultural and industrial economic sectors.

As recommended by the International Monetary Fund and World Bank, Flores imposed strict financial guidelines: deflationary monetary fund policies, fiscal austerity, and privatization of the airports and the national communications company, Hondutel, the latter with mixed outcome.

He also limited the power held by the military forces, forcing them to relinquish some power to the presidency.

On August 26, 1998, Flores instituted the Ministry of Public Security under the provisions of the National Plan to combat crime and criminality. This was a response to the ominous growth of violent gangs, particularly the Mara Salvatrucha. Government initiatives in this area did not produce significant results, and completely ignored murderous activity in the country, particularly the actions of a series of armed death squads that extrajudicially killed homeless children and adolescents living in the margins of society. Reports from Human Rights Commission United Nations, the Committee for the Defense of Human Rights in Honduras (CODEH) and other NGOs indicate that the casualties caused by such violence on children barely improved during the four years of Flores' presidency.

== Personal life ==
Flores is married to Mary Flake de Flores, whom he met while a student at Louisiana State University. Their daughter, Mary Elizabeth Flores Flake, is the permanent representative of Honduras to the United Nations.

== Footnotes ==
Political offices
Preceded by Rodolfo Irás Navas	President of the National Congress of Honduras; 1994–1998	Succeeded by Rafael Pineda Ponce
Preceded by Carlos Roberto Reina	President of Honduras; 1998–2002	Succeeded by Ricardo Maduro
