= Ricardo Maduro =

President of Honduras from 2002 to 2006

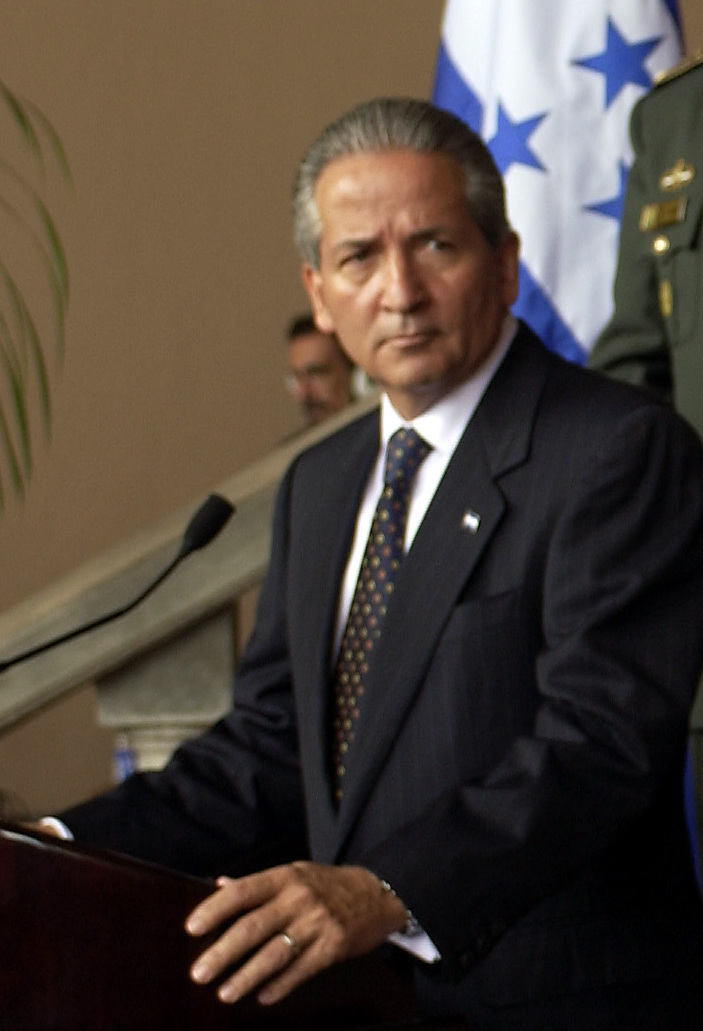
- Maduro in Tegucigalpa in 2003

51st President of Honduras
- In office 27 January 2002 – 27 January 2006
- Vice President: Vicente Williams Agasse
- Preceded by: Carlos Roberto Flores
- Succeeded by: Manuel Zelaya

President of the Central Bank of Honduras
- In office 27 January 1990 – 27 January 1994
- President: Rafael Leonardo Callejas
- Preceded by: Gonzalo Carías
- Succeeded by: Roberto Galvez

Personal details
- Born: Ricardo Rodolfo Maduro Joest; 20 April 1946 (age 80) Panama
- Party: National Party of Honduras
- Spouse: Melissa Callejas (m. 2009) Aguas Santas Ocaña Navarro (m. 2002; div. 2006)
- Education: The Lawrenceville School; Stanford University

Ricardo Rodolfo Maduro Joest (born 20 April 1946 in Panama) is a Honduran politician who served as President of Honduras from 2002 to 2006. A member of the National Party of Honduras (PNH), Maduro was previously chairman of the Central Bank of Honduras. Maduro is a member of the Levy-Maduro family whose roots go through Portugal, the Netherlands and the Netherlands Antilles.

== Early life and education ==
Maduro was born on 20 April 1946 in Panama.

He is a member of the Levy-Maduro family whose roots go through Portugal, the Netherlands and the Netherlands Antilles, and is of Jewish descent.

He studied at the Lawrenceville School, and later Stanford University.

== Career ==
He was a general manager of Xerox in Honduras.

Despite a constitutional ban on those not born in Honduras from becoming President, he was allowed to stand as the PNH candidate . In his campaign he promised to tackle crime and the Mara Salvatrucha gang (maras). He immediately brought troops out onto the streets of the larger cities to accompany the local police. The PNH-held National Congress passed laws making illicit association a crime, which have seen hundreds of gang members put behind bars.

On 1 May 2005 the plane Maduro was traveling in crashed into the Caribbean Sea off the shore of Tela. Maduro, his daughter Lorena, and the pilot were reportedly not seriously injured and were rescued by local residents. He was taken to a hospital in Comayagua to recover.

On 27 November 2005 Maduro presided over the 2005 Honduran general election. His party lost the presidency to the Liberal Party of Honduras (PLH) and its candidate Manuel Zelaya. Zelaya succeeded Maduro on 27 January 2006.

Maduro currently serves as President of Inversiones la Paz in Tegucigalpa, and is active in the education organization he created in honor of his son, the Fundacion para la Educacion Ricardo Ernesto Maduro Andreu, FEREMA.

== Personal life ==
His first marriage to Miriam Andréu produced three daughters and a son, Ricardo Ernesto, who was kidnapped at age 25 on 23 April 1997. Ricardo Ernesto's body was discovered two days later.

In October 2002, Maduro married Aguas Santas Ocaña Navarro, whom he met when she was a member of the Spanish Embassy in Honduras. Shortly after he left office, Maduro and Ocaña filed for divorce. She consequently moved to Nicaragua with her adoptive children to direct a non-profit organization devoted to children. Maduro remained in Tegucigalpa. Maduro's eldest son, Ricardo Roberto, is a United States citizen and lives in the U.S with his two children.

== Honors ==
- Order of Brilliant Jade with Grand Cordon (Republic of China)

== See also ==
- History of Honduras
- Politics of Honduras

Political offices
Preceded by Carlos Flores	President of Honduras; 2002–2006	Succeeded by Manuel Zelaya
