= Western Caribbean zone =

Subregion of North America and South America

The western Caribbean zone is a region consisting of the Caribbean coasts of Central America and Colombia, from the Yucatán Peninsula in southern Mexico to the Caribbean region in northern Colombia, and also including the islands west of Jamaica. The zone emerged in the late 16th century as the Spanish failed to completely conquer many sections of the coast, and northern European powers supported opposition to Spain, sometimes through alliances with local powers.

Unsubdued indigenous inhabitants of the region included some Maya polities, and other chiefdoms and egalitarian societies, especially in Belize, eastern Honduras, Nicaragua, and Costa Rica. In addition, the region was the refuge of several groups of runaway slaves, who formed independent settlements or intermixed with the indigenous societies. The combination of unsubdued indigenous people, outlaws (pirates in this case), and an absence of outside control made it similar in some aspects to the American West or the Wild West, as the western half of North America is often called.

Its long engagement with the English-speaking Caribbean made it an ideal conduit for trade from both the English colonies of the Caribbean, especially Jamaica, but also North America, which had been trading in the zone since the 18th century at least. The relatively low population and strategic location attracted United States–based transportation companies to promote infrastructure projects from railroads to the Panama Canal in the zone, and conjointly with that to introduce large-scale fruit production toward the end of the 19th century, often bringing in labor from the English-speaking Caribbean to assist.

Unique elements of the region, relative to the population of Central America in general, are the high percentage of people of whole or partial African descent, and its cultural connections to English and the English-speaking Caribbean through language and religion.

== Early Spanish settlement and conquest ==
The first Spanish settlements on the mainland of South America were at Darien, where Spanish military activities were prominent in the first years of the 16th century. But, the Spanish abandoned their positions at Darien by 1520, leaving it, as well as the province of Veragua on the Caribbean coast of Panama, in the hands of the indigenous peoples. This situation continued well into the 18th century. The government's occasional licenses given to ambitious Spaniards to conquer or settle these regions never resulted in any significant or long-lasting occupation, nor did attempts of missionaries to convert the indigenous inhabitants result in change.

The Spanish founded towns along the coast of modern-day Venezuela and Colombia, notably, Santa Marta in 1525 and Cartagena. From these towns they expanded inland to the lands of the Muisca in the highlands. They were less successful on several parts of the coast, where unconquered pockets remained, notably at the Rio de la Hacha and the Gulf of Urabá.

Spanish successes in Central America took place mostly on the Pacific side of the isthmus, especially as the victorious Spanish and their Mexica and Tlaxcalan allies entered Guatemala in 1524 from the north. While the primary goal of the conquest was the Maya kingdoms of the Guatemala highlands, and the Pipil, Lenca, and other kingdoms of Honduras and Nicaragua, most of their success occurred on the Pacific side of the Isthmus. A moderately wealthy Spanish colony, called the "Kingdom of Guatemala", was founded on the mining economy of that region (Encompassing Chile, Belize, and El Salvador among others), while not as prosperous as those of Peru or Mexico in gold exports supported Spanish towns and settlements, often at former Maya, Lenca or Pipil towns.

Farther south, attempts to subjugate the territory of modern-day Costa Rica were failures, although they did manage to capture slaves for labor elsewhere in the isthmus and outside it. There were numerous entradas (invasions) authorized but all had to withdraw under stiff resistance. Towns that were founded in the 1560s were all destroyed by early 17th century attacks, especially led by the Talamacas, and as a result the Spanish only occupied the region around the town of Cartago and the Nicoya Peninsula. Attempts to reduce the area through missionary activity, mostly under the guidance of the Franciscans, also failed to produce much fruit, and further hostilities in the 1760s and 1780s ended that period.

The Spanish founded some towns on the Caribbean side of Central America, most notably Puerto de Caballos, Trujillo, Gracias a Dios and Portobelo, as well as a significant inland town at San Pedro Sula. But they failed to conquer the provinces of Taguzgalpa and Tologalpa in today's northeast Honduras and western Nicaragua as well as much of the coast of Panama and Costa Rica which also lay beyond their control, save a few key towns. They established reasonable control of the coastal lowlands of northern Yucatán after 1540, but the interior of Yucatán remained independent under the Itza kingdom. The coastal regions on the south and southeast side of Yucatán, while nominally under Spanish control in the province of Verapaz, were ruled by missionaries and exercised considerable freedom of action under the Spanish administration.

For much of the 16th and early 17th centuries, the Spanish were content to allow the Caribbean side of Central America remain under loose control (as around the towns of Puerto Caballo, Trujillo or Portobello). They used the towns and the routes to them for transporting products of the Pacific side, including Peru to be shipped and exported to Spain.

== The African runaways ==
By the mid-16th century, slaves working the transportation routes which carried silver from Peru to Panama and then across the isthmus to Nombre de Dios, and later Portobello, ran away and formed independent communities in the mountains north of the city. The Spanish called such runaway slave communities cimarrons. A large community with multiple settlements had developed there by 1550, initially headed by a king named Bayano whose headquarters was in Darien. After he was captured in 1558, other men succeeded him as leader.

Somewhat later, other groups formed especially drawing on the many slaves in Panama who were called up to carry silver across the isthmus of Panama from Panama to Nombre de Dios, the Atlantic port. By the 1560s there were two large communities, each with its own king, on both sides of the route. In 1572 the Panama Cimarrons allied with the English privateer Sir Francis Drake to try to take Nombre de Dios. In 1582, the cimarrons agreed to accept Spanish authority in exchange for their permanent freedom.

Other cimmaron communities formed in Nicaragua and Honduras, especially slaves fleeing the mines and transportation corridors. Thomas Gage, the English bishop of Guatemala, noted several hundred escaped slaves in the early 1630s.

== English and Dutch challenges ==
In the late 16th century, privateers, especially English ones, began to raid Spanish shipping in the Caribbean. Francis Drake, one of the more successful, allied with the Cimarrons of Panama in 1572 and, with their assistance, stormed the city of Panama. In the subsequent years, both Dutch and English privateers linked with cimarrons to attack the trading towns of the Caribbean coast. In 1630, the English Providence Island Company founded the Providence Island colony. They used it until the Spanish successfully counterattacked in 1641 to capture shipping and raid the coast of Honduras and Nicaragua. Following the fall of Providence Island, the English transferred operations on the coast to Jamaica; many privateers began using the Cayman Islands as a forward base for attacks on the isthmus.

== Pirate havens and illicit commerce ==
Pirates or buccaneers, some of whom were formerly privateers, took over much of activity of the earlier privateers, especially during the Golden Age of Piracy (1660–1720). Operating from bases within the Caribbean, such as Tortuga and later Jamaica and the Cayman Islands, pirates regularly raided Spanish possessions and shipping along the whole of the Western Caribbean. They frequently stopped to re-supply at such places as Rio de la Hacha, Darien (which they also used as a base for raids on Panama or to cross to the Pacific) or the Miskito areas.

When the European colonial powers began to suppress piracy in the late 17th and early 18th centuries, colonial merchants often used the same havens to deliver goods from northern Europe to Spanish markets. The Spanish Crown's restrictive trade policies, granting of monopolies to favored domestic suppliers, and inability to produce consumer goods cheaply, made smuggling a major activity for English, Dutch and French merchants. The lucrative trade also enriched the indigenous groups of the area, but attracted frequent Spanish expeditions against them.

In the 18th century, ships from English colonies, but particularly Jamaica and also North America, regularly visited the Miskito Kingdom and Belize. Many of the commercial vessels were from Jamaica and New York City, but ships also came from New England. In 1718 General Shute the governor of Massachusetts dispatched a warship to protect their interests during the Anglo-Spanish War.

== The Miskito Kingdom and English settlements ==
The Miskito people, who had formed a "Kingdom of the Mosquitos" made an alliance with Great Britain in the late 1630s. They were joined around 1640 by the survivors of a rebellion on board a slave ship who wrecked the craft at Cape Gracias a Dios. The Miskito took the rebels in and intermarried with them, creating a mixed-race group called Miskitos-Zambos. By the early 18th century this group had taken over the Mosquito Kingdom and were raiding far and wide throughout Central America. Capitalizing on a long term alliance with the English of Jamaica, they placed themselves under the protection of England and both prevented Spanish occupation of the area while allowing the English the security to found their colony in British Honduras (Belize). In the late 17th century, Englishmen began to settle on the coast, especially on the stretch from Nicaragua to the Yucatán. The settlements, while often scattered in small groups, were concentrated in the area of modern-day Belize. To provide labor for the logging industry, the British imported African slaves and created fairly dense settlement. A second concentration was in the Mosquito Kingdom, as the British often called the eastern lowlands of Honduras and Nicaragua. Britain, through its positions in Jamaica and the Cayman Islands, which were more formally taken over and colonized in the second half of the 18th century, formed a military alliance with the Miskito. The Miskitos raided widely, reaching as far north as the Yucatán, and as far south as Panama. In 1746 Britain declared much of the area an informal protectorate, and in 1766 sent a governor who resided in Bluefields (Nicaragua) and answered to the governor of Jamaica.

== The Garifuna ==
In the later 18th century, Caribbean Central America was often used as a place of exile. During the revolutionary wars of the later 18th century, the French deported African-descended militia units to Honduras, and in 1797 the British dispatched the so-called "Black Caribs" of St Vincent to Roatán in the Bay of Honduras. Many of these groups eventually found their way to the mainland as well, some retaining a distinct identity while others gradually blended into the existing population. Today the people of mixed African-indigenous descent are usually known by the name of Garifuna.

== Independence ==
Spain had maintained a formal claim to the whole Caribbean coast of Central America since the 16th century, though it was not always able to enforce it. When the Central American countries attained their independence in the aftermath of the Mexican War of Independence, they claimed the region as part of their respective national territories.

Great Britain claimed a protectorate status over the Miskitu, aided by their relatively dense settlement in Belize. Because of the insecure nature of the borders, Costa Rica, Panama, Nicaragua and Honduras all had to seek international adjudication to determine their Atlantic boundaries. In the aftermath, Britain lost its claim to coastal Nicaragua, but retained British Honduras.

Although the British legacy was largely lost politically, the coastal regions kept some unique cultural characteristics. The population retained close cultural ties to the British West Indies, especially Jamaica, from which many of the people originally derived. The English language and Anglican Church were prominent along with Spanish and Catholic identities. Protestant missionaries, such as the Moravians in Nicaragua, were also active in the area. This identity as English speakers would be reinforced with the North American transportation and fruit producing concerns entered the region in the later 19th century.

== Filibusters ==
The Atlantic coast of Central America was also an ideal base for filibusters, U. S. based adventurers who tried to intervene in the affairs of Central American republics. William Walker's short lived take over of Nicaragua in 1856 was the most famous and important of these private military adventurers.

== The Yucatán Caste War ==
In the mid-19th century the Caste War, a major civil war broke out in Yucatán, pitting Mexican and Spanish settlers and the Mexican government against insurgent Mayas. The war was long and protracted, lasting until 1902, and created many refugees. These refugees, who were of a wide variety of origins, pushed into British Honduras and Honduras. In the case of British Honduras they came to form a significant portion of the population, and many were employed in the logging and other industries.

== Panama Canal ==
Several attempts to build a Panama Canal from the Atlantic to the Pacific side of Central America failed before US interests acquired the French project and lands in 1902. In constructing the canal, the US builders employed thousands of workers from the British Caribbean, especially Jamaica and Barbados. As a result of this immigration, an English-speaking community grew up in the Canal Zone and adjacent areas. It continues to this day.

== Railroad construction and the U. S. fruit companies ==
In the late 19th century, the Caribbean coast of Central America was a backwater, poorly developed and in many cases only partially controlled by its legal governments. Most of the Caribbean side of Costa Rica was under the control of Talamanca and other indigenous groups. Nicaragua and others had to consider the independent Miskito Kingdom until 1894. Mexico gained control of its portion of the Yucatán only following the end of the Caste War in 1902.

The California Gold Rush after 1849 created a very large demand for rapid, sea borne travel from the East Coast of the United States (as well as other parts of the world) and the Pacific, and Central America was a potentially usable route. As a result, there were various attempts to build railroads across the isthmus. In 1850, Honduras began work, financed and overseen by largely United States capital, on the Inter-Ocean Railroad (Ferrocaril Interoceanico), though the work did not extend very far for many years.

In the 1870s, Jamaica and the Bay Islands of Honduras began to export fruit, especially bananas, to the U. S. market, and entrepreneurs like the Vaccaro Brothers of New Orleans and Lorenzo Dow Baker of Boston hoped to capitalize on controlling shipping of bananas to US markets to make big profits. At the same time, Minor C. Keith, who had taken over his uncle Henry Meiggs' railroad project (founded in 1871) to build a railroad from the coast of Costa Rica to San Jose, its capital, decided to plant bananas along his rail lines, and in fact the banana export business saved his investment. As banana growing spread into Honduras from the Bay Islands, too, the question of building railroads to increase areas able to participate in the international economy grew and a number of firms merged fruit production, railroad building and shipping into vertically integrated large-scale concerns. By 1920 they were dominated by the United Fruit (now Chiquita) and Standard Fruit (now Dole).

The opening up of land, and the fact that the fruit companies paid higher than average wages soon drew thousands of immigrants to the banana producing regions, from the densely settled highland settlements of the Pacific side, and from other parts of the Americas. Among the immigrant workers, the companies often preferred workers from the English-speaking Caribbean primarily from Jamaica and Belize since they could speak English. Local workers often resented this new, African-descended English speaking and largely Protestant element, and protested and struck against them.

The U. S. Companies relied heavily on connections with elites in the various countries of the region, as well as the willingness of the U. S. to intervene if the company's interests were threatened. This combination of local cooperation and imperialist intervention led the visiting American novelist O. Henry, to declare "Anchuria" his name for Honduras, a "banana republic" in 1904. This term has been widely applied to such combinations elsewhere in Central American and in the world.

== International commerce ==
In the 19th century, North American concerns began the construction of railroads in much of Central America, which necessarily started on the contested zone of the Western Caribbean. In the process of this and the development of the fruit companies, North American and particularly New English contacts and influence continued. While the international engagement began with the fruit companies which dominated the economy of the Atlantic side of most Central American countries, in the 1970s they were joined by multi-national textile companies which established large-scale workshops (maquiladoras) to produce clothing for the international market. Many of the shops are owned by Asian (especially Korean) concerns, though their target markets remain in North American.

== Cultural characteristics ==
The western Caribbean zone is a multicultural region, including populations of Spanish mestizo origin, indigenous groups, African-indigenous mixed race populations, Europeans and European Americans, and creole populations of African and mixed African-European origin. However, one of the characteristics of much of the region is the speaking of English, not only in Belize, a former English colony, but also as enclaved populations along the coast from Panama to Belize. In the case of the Belize and the Cayman Islands English is the official language, but there are significant English speaking majorities in the Bay Islands of Honduras.

In the countries of official Spanish language, the English speaking minorities have often been disparaged, particularly in Honduras, where the English speaking population is perceived as having been brought in by the fruit companies as a means of undercutting indigenous and mestizo landholding and labor. Their more ancient connections to English colonialism or attempted colonialism, as along the Miskito coast of Nicaragua and Honduras, has been combined with the perceptions that they are agents of North American/United States imperialism. This perception has led to occasionally racist depictions of the population the popular press and among politicians. These sentiments were often manifested by the deportation of workers who could be established as having originated in Belize or Jamaica (as well as other English speaking Caribbean colonies.

Beyond linguistic identities, the Western Caribbean often exhibited culinary habits associated with the English speaking Caribbean, or family structure characteristic of that region, such as a reluctance to enter into legal marriages, but instead, what is frequently called "common law" marriages. The family structure that results from the marriage strategies of the English-speaking Caribbean, often called the matrifocal family, was first described and identified by Nancie Gonzalez in her work on the Garifuna of Nicaragua and Belize.

== See also ==
- Association of Caribbean States
- Caribbean Basin
- Caribbean Plate
- Caribbean Sea
- Caribbean South America
- Greater Caribbean
- List of Caribbean islands
- Organisation of Eastern Caribbean States
- Southern Caribbean
- West Caribbean Airways
- West Indies
