= West Indies =

Island region in North Atlantic and Caribbean

Coordinates: 19°N 71°W

- Area: 239,681 km^{2} (92,541 sq mi)
- Population: ▲44,182,048
- Population density: 151.5/km^{2} (392/sq mi)
- Ethnic groups: Afro-Caribbean; Latin-Caribbean; Indo-Caribbean; White-Caribbean; Mixed-Caribbean; Asian-Caribbean; Indigenous
- Religions: 73.5% Christianity; 52.3% Catholicism; 20.2% Protestantism; 1.0% other Christian; 20.6% no religion; 2.5% folk religions; 2.1% Hinduism; 1.3% others
- Demonym: West Indian; Caribbean; West Indy (colloquial)
- Countries: 13: Antigua and Barbuda; The Bahamas; Barbados; Cuba; Dominica; Dominican Republic; Grenada; Haiti; Jamaica; Saint Kitts and Nevis; Saint Lucia; Saint Vincent and the Grenadines; Trinidad and Tobago
- Dependencies: 18: Anguilla (UK); Aruba (Netherlands); Bonaire (Netherlands); British Virgin Islands (UK); Cayman Islands (UK); Curaçao (Netherlands); Guadeloupe (France); Martinique (France); Montserrat (UK); Haiti-Navassa Island (United States) and (Haiti); Puerto Rico (United States); Saba (Netherlands); Saint Barthélemy (France); Saint Martin (France); Sint Eustatius (Netherlands); Sint Maarten (Netherlands); Turks and Caicos Islands (UK); US Virgin Islands (United States)
- Languages: Spanish; French; English; Dutch; Spanish Creoles; French Creoles; English Creoles; Dutch Creoles; Papiamento; Caribbean Hindustani; Indigenous languages
- Time zone: UTC−05:00 to UTC−04:00
- Internet TLD: Multiple
- Calling codes: Multiple
- Largest cities: Santo Domingo; Havana; Port-au-Prince; San Juan; Port of Spain; Kingston; Santiago de Cuba; Santiago de los Caballeros; Nassau; Camagüey; Cap-Haïtien
- UN M49 codes: 029 – Caribbean; 419 – Latin America; 019 – Americas; 001 – World

The West Indies are an island subregion of the Americas, surrounded by the North Atlantic Ocean and the Caribbean Sea, which comprises 13 independent island countries and 18 dependencies in three archipelagos: the Greater Antilles, the Lesser Antilles, and the Lucayan Archipelago.

The subregion includes all the islands in the Antilles, in addition to The Bahamas and the Turks and Caicos Islands, which are in the North Atlantic Ocean. The term is often interchangeable with "Caribbean", although the latter may also include coastal regions of Central and South American mainland nations.

West Indies as seen from space at night, 2012

== Terminology ==
The English term Indie is derived from the Classical Latin India, a reference to the territories in South Asia adjacent and east to the Indus River. India is borrowed from Ancient Greek Ἰνδία, which is borrowed from Old Persian Hindush (an eastern province of the Achaemenid Empire), whose cognate is Sanskrit Sindhu, which means 'river'. The ancient Greeks referred to the Indians as Indoi (Ἰνδοί), lit. 'people of the Indus'.

The current composition of the Indies is as follows: East Indies (Indochina and Insulindia) Indies (Indian subcontinent and Myanmar) West Papua (part of East Indies) West Indies (present-day; historically included the Americas entirely) West Indies (region at times included)

In 1492, Christopher Columbus left Spain seeking a western sea passage to the Eastern world, hoping to profit from the lucrative spice trade emanating from Hindustan, Indochina, and Insulindia, the regions currently found within the Indian subcontinent and Southeast Asia, which were first simply referred to by Spanish and Portuguese explorers as the Indias (Indies).

Thinking he had landed on the easternmost part of the Indies in the Eastern world when he came upon the New World, specifically in Champa in what is now southern Vietnam, Columbus used the term Indias to refer to the Americas, calling its native people Indios (Indians). To avoid confusion between the known Indies of the Eastern Hemisphere and the newly discovered Indies of the Western Hemisphere, the Spanish named the territories in the East Indias Orientales (East Indies) and the territories in the West Indias Occidentales (West Indies). Originally, the term West Indies applied to all of the Americas.

The Indies from both regions were further distinguished depending on the European world power to which they belonged. In the East Indies, there were the Spanish East Indies and the Dutch East Indies. In the West Indies, the Spanish West Indies, the Dutch West Indies, the French West Indies, the British West Indies, and the Danish West Indies.

The term was used to name the Spanish Council of the Indies, the British East India Company, the Dutch East India and West India companies, the French East India Company, and the Danish East India Company.

"West Indies" or "West India" was a part of the names of several companies of the 17th and 18th centuries, including the Danish West India Company, the Dutch West India Company, the French West India Company, and the Swedish West India Company. West Indian is the official term used by the U.S. government to refer to people of the West Indies. The term survives today mainly through the West Indies cricket team, representing all of the nations in the West Indian islands.

== History ==
Many cultures were Indigenous to these islands, with evidence dating some of them back to the mid-6th millennium BCE. In the late 16th century, French, English and Dutch merchants and privateers began operations in the Caribbean Sea, attacking Spanish and Portuguese shipping and coastal areas. They often took refuge and refitted their ships in the areas the Spanish could not conquer, including the islands of the Lesser Antilles, the northern coast of South America, including the mouth of the Orinoco, and the Atlantic Coast of Central America. In the Lesser Antilles, they managed to establish a foothold following the colonisation of Saint Kitts in 1624 and Barbados in 1626, and when the Sugar Revolution took off in the mid-17th century, they brought in thousands of enslaved Africans to work the fields and mills as labourers. These enslaved Africans wrought a demographic revolution, replacing or joining with either the Indigenous Kalinago or the European settlers who were there as indentured servants.

The struggle between the northern Europeans and the Spanish spread southward in the mid- to late-17th century, as English, Dutch, French and Spanish colonists, and in many cases, enslaved Africans first entered and then occupied the coast of The Guianas (which fell to the French, English and Dutch) and the Orinoco valley, which fell to the Spanish. The Dutch, allied with the Kalinago of the Orinoco, would eventually carry the struggles deep into South America, first along the Orinoco and then along the northern reaches of the Amazon. Since no European country had occupied much of Central America, gradually the English of Jamaica established alliances with the Miskito Kingdom of modern-day Nicaragua and Honduras and then began logging on the coast of modern-day Belize. These interconnected commercial and diplomatic relations comprised the Western Caribbean Zone in place in the early-18th century. In the Miskito Kingdom, the rise to power of the Miskito-Zambos—who originated in the survivors of a rebellion aboard a slave ship in the 1640s and the introduction of enslaved Africans by British settlers within the Miskito area and in Belize—transformed this area into one with a high percentage of persons of African descent as was found in most of the rest of the Caribbean.

In 1916, Denmark sold the Danish West Indies to the United States for US$25 million in gold, per the Treaty of the Danish West Indies, which became an insular area of the U.S., called the United States Virgin Islands.

Between 1958 and 1962, the United Kingdom re-organised all their West Indies island territories (except the British Virgin Islands and The Bahamas) into the West Indies Federation. They hoped that the federation would coalesce into a single, independent nation. The federation had limited powers, numerous practical problems, and a lack of popular support; consequently, it was dissolved in 1963, with nine provinces eventually becoming independent sovereign states and four becoming British Overseas Territories.

== Geology ==
Caribbean Basin countries

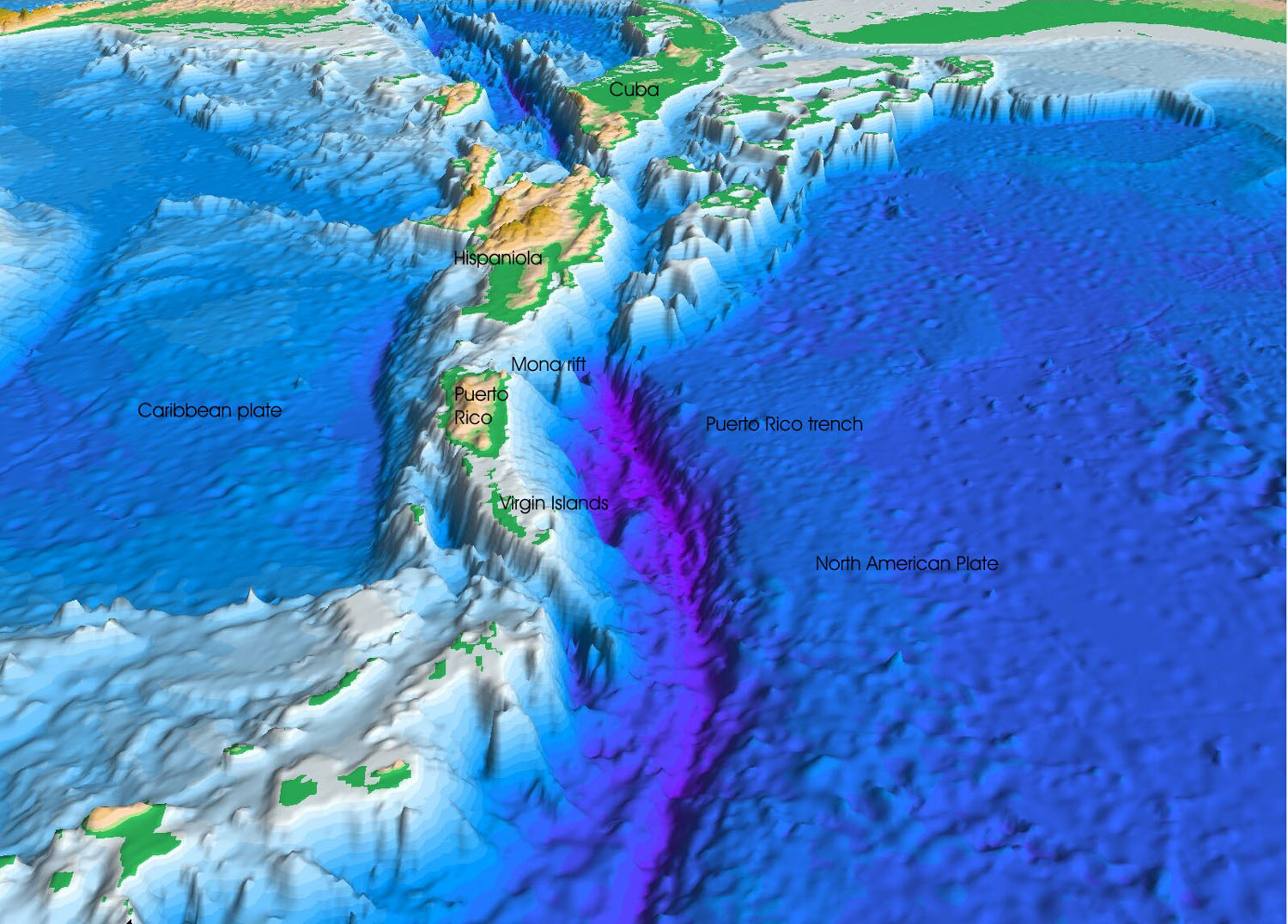
The subduction of the South American Plate and part of the North American Plate beneath the Caribbean Plate produces both the Puerto Rico Trench, the deepest part of the Atlantic Ocean, as well as the active volcanoes of the Lesser Antilles (bottom left of the image, south of the Virgin Islands)

The West Indies are a geologically complex island system consisting of 7,000 islands and islets stretching over 3,000 km (2,000 miles) from the Florida peninsula south-southeast to the northern coast of Venezuela. These islands include active volcanoes, low-lying atolls, raised limestone islands, and large fragments of continental crust containing tall mountains and insular rivers. Each of the three archipelagos has a unique origin and geologic composition.

=== Greater Antilles ===
The Greater Antilles is geologically the oldest of the three archipelagos and includes both the largest islands (Cuba, Hispaniola, Jamaica, and Puerto Rico) and the tallest mountains (Pico Duarte, Blue Mountain Peak, Pic la Selle, Pico Turquino) in the Caribbean. The islands are composed of strata of different geological ages including Precambrian fragmented remains of the North American plate (older than 539 million years), Jurassic aged limestone (201.3-145 million years ago, Ma), as well as island arc deposits and oceanic crust from the Cretaceous (145–66 Ma).

The Greater Antilles originated near the isthmian region of present-day Central America in the Late Cretaceous (commonly referred to as the Proto-Antilles), then drifted eastward arriving in their current location when colliding with the Bahama Platform of the North American plate ca. 56 million years ago in the late Paleocene. This collision caused subduction and volcanism in the Proto-Antillean area and likely resulted in continental uplift of the Bahama Platform and changes in sea level. The Greater Antilles have continuously been exposed since the start of the Paleocene or at least since the Middle Eocene (66–40 Ma), but which areas were above sea level throughout the history of the islands remains unresolved.

The oldest rocks are located in Cuba. They consist of metamorphosed graywacke, argillite, tuff, mafic igneous extrusive flows, and carbonate rock. It is estimated that nearly 70% of Cuba consists of karst limestone. The Blue Mountains of Jamaica are a granite outcrop rising over 2,000 meters (6,000 feet), while the rest of the island to the west consists mainly of karst limestone. Much of Hispaniola, Puerto Rico, and the Virgin Islands were formed by the collision of the Caribbean plate with the North American plate and consist of 12 island arc terranes. These terranes consist of oceanic crust, volcanic and plutonic rock.

=== Lesser Antilles ===
The Lesser Antilles is a volcanic island arc rising along the leading edge of the Caribbean plate due to the subduction of the Atlantic seafloor of the North American and South American plates. Major islands likely emerged less than 20 Ma, during the Miocene. The volcanic activity that formed these islands began in the Paleogene, after a period of volcanism in the Greater Antilles ended, and continues today. The main arc runs north from the coast of Venezuela to the Anegada Passage, a strait separating them from the Greater Antilles, and includes 19 active volcanoes.

=== Lucayan Archipelago ===
The Lucayan Archipelago includes The Bahamas and the Turks and Caicos Islands, a chain of barrier reefs and low islands atop the Bahama Platform. The Bahama Platform is a carbonate block formed of marine sediments and fixed to the North American plate. The emergent islands of The Bahamas and Turks and Caicos likely formed from accumulated deposits of wind-blown sediments during Pleistocene glacial periods of lower sea level.

== Countries and territories by subregion and archipelago ==
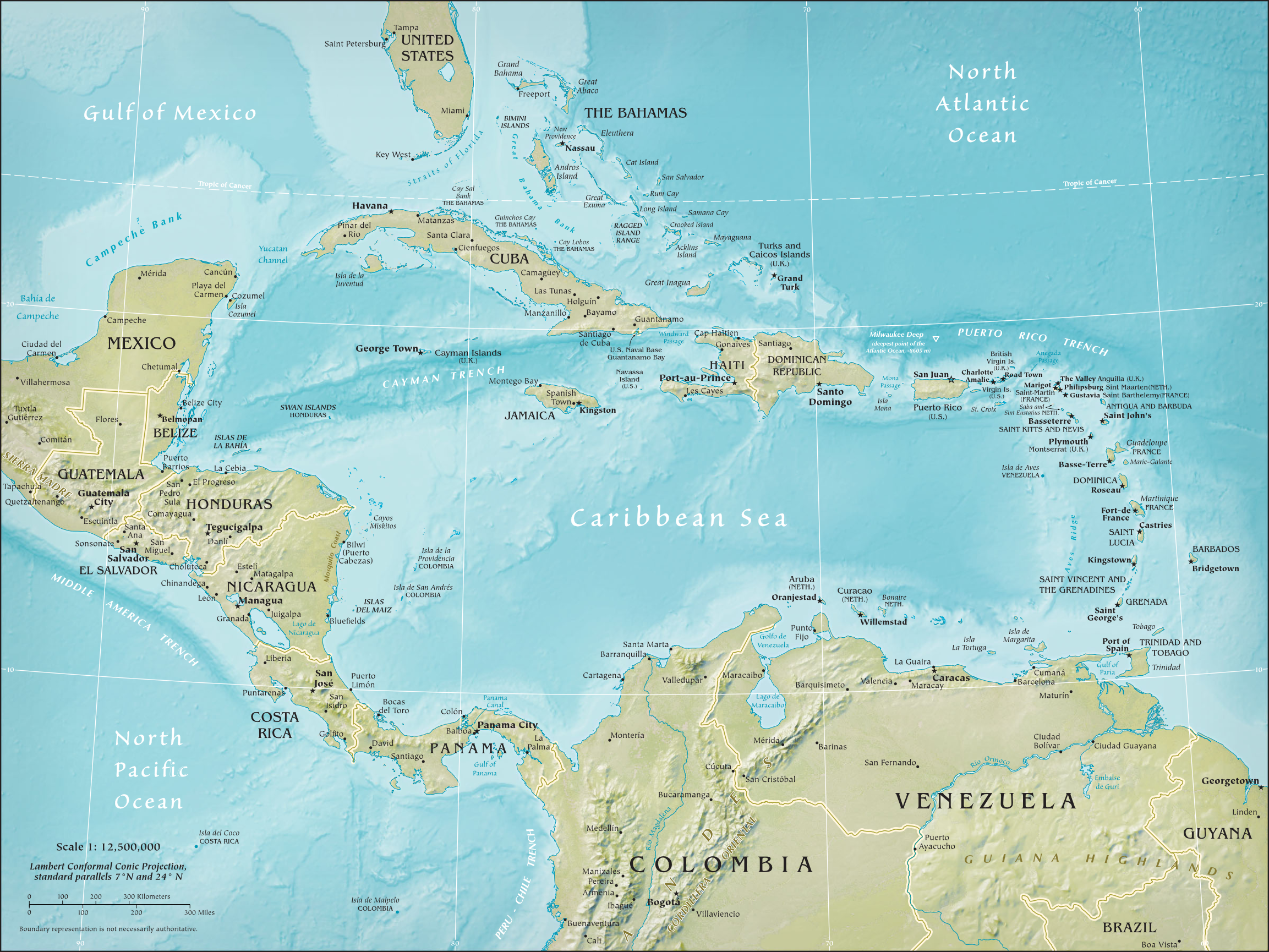
Map of the West Indies

Island groups comprising the West Indies in the Caribbean

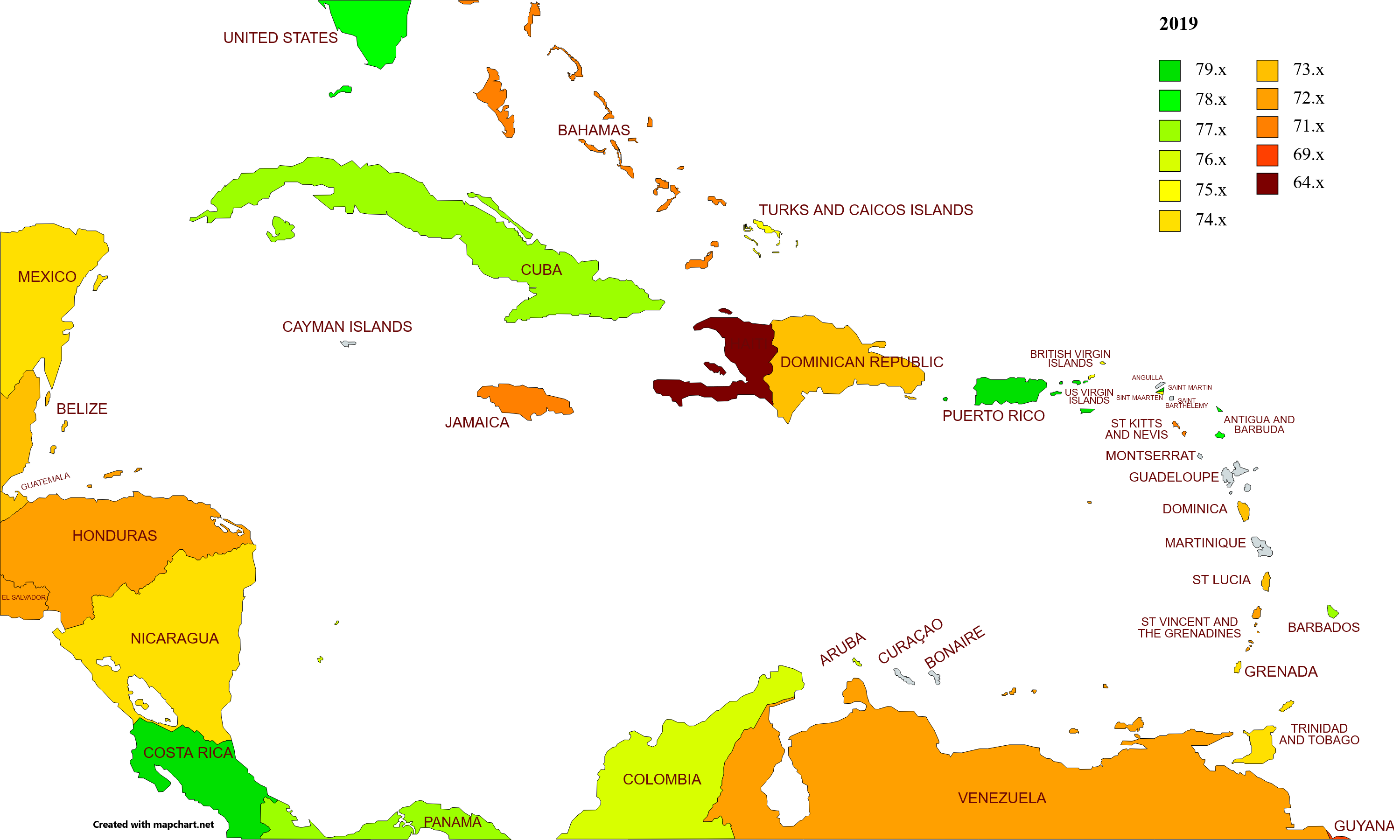
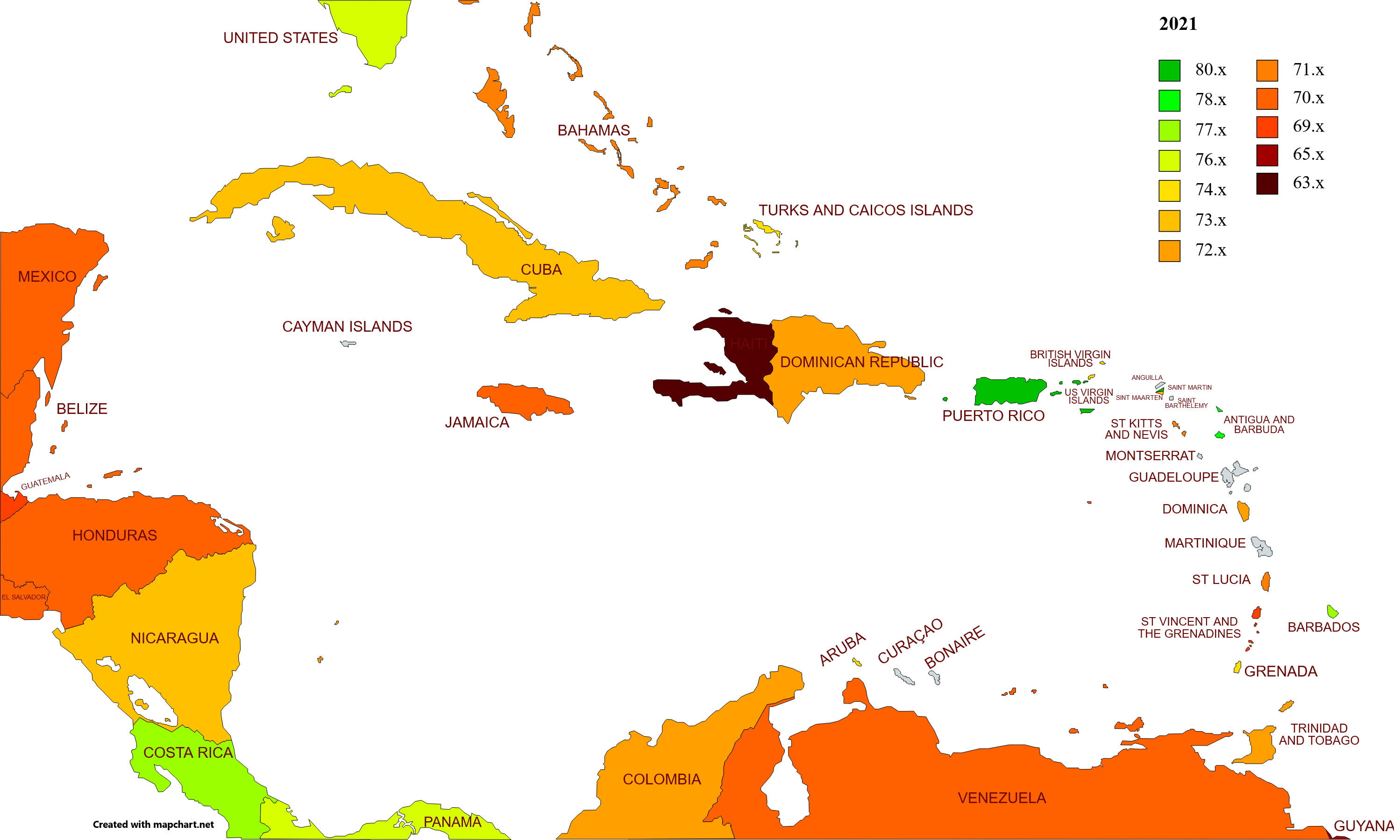
Life expectancy in the West Indies in 2019 and 2021

=== Caribbean (core area) ===
==== Antilles ====
===== Greater Antilles =====
- Cayman Islands (United Kingdom)
- Cuba
- Jamaica
- Navassa Island (United States)
- Puerto Rico (United States)
- Hispaniola
  - Dominican Republic
  - Haiti

===== Lesser Antilles =====
====== Leeward Antilles ======
- (Kingdom of the Netherlands) ABC islands
  - Aruba (Netherlands)
  - Bonaire^{*} (Netherlands)
  - Curaçao (Netherlands)
- Federal Dependencies of Venezuela (Venezuela)
- Nueva Esparta (Venezuela)

====== Leeward Islands ======
- Anguilla (United Kingdom)
- Antigua and Barbuda
- Guadeloupe (France)
  - La Désirade
  - Les Saintes
  - Marie-Galante
- Montserrat (United Kingdom)
- Saint Barthélemy (France)
- Saint Kitts and Nevis
- Saint Martin (France)
- (Kingdom of the Netherlands) SSS islands
  - Saba^{*} (Netherlands)
  - Sint Eustatius^{*} (Netherlands)
  - Sint Maarten (Netherlands)
- Virgin Islands
  - British Virgin Islands (United Kingdom)
  - (Puerto Rico) Spanish Virgin Islands (United States)
  - U.S. Virgin Islands (United States)

====== Windward Islands ======
- Dominica
- Grenada
  - Carriacou and Petite Martinique
- Martinique (France)
- Saint Lucia
- Saint Vincent and the Grenadines

====== Isolated islands in the Lesser Antilles ======
- Barbados^{†}
- Trinidad and Tobago^{†}

==== Lucayan Archipelago ====
- The Bahamas
- Turks and Caicos Islands (United Kingdom)

==== Isolated island in the Caribbean ====
- (Federal Dependencies of Venezuela) Aves Island (Venezuela)

=== Central America ===
- Belize
- Costa Rica
- Guatemala
- Honduras
- Nicaragua
- Panama
- Quintana Roo (Mexico^{^})
- San Andrés and Providencia (Colombia)
  - Bajo Nuevo Bank^{~}
  - Serranilla Bank^{~}
- Yucatán (Mexico^{^})

=== Northern America ===
- Bermuda (United Kingdom)

=== South America ===
- Colombia
- French Guiana (France)
- Guyana
- Suriname
- Venezuela

N.B.: Territories in italics are parts of transregional sovereign states or non-sovereign dependencies.

^{*} These three Dutch Caribbean territories form the BES islands.

^{†} Physiographically, these are continental islands not part of the volcanic Windward Islands arc. Based on proximity, these islands are sometimes grouped with the Windward Islands culturally and politically.

^{~} Disputed territories administered by Colombia.

^{^} The United Nations geoscheme includes Mexico in Central America.

== See also ==
- Caribbean Basin Initiative
- Caribbean Basin Trade Partnership Act
- Caribbean Community
- History of the British West Indies
- Spanish colonization of the Americas
- West Indies cricket team

== Sources ==
- Kuiper, K., ed. (2010), The Culture of India, Britannica Educational Publishing, ISBN 978-1-61530-203-1
- Thieme, P. (1970). "Sanskrit sindu-/Sindhu- and Old Iranian hindu-/Hindu-". In Mary Boyce; Ilya Gershevitch (eds.). W. B. Henning Memorial Volume. Lund Humphries. ISBN 978-0-85331-255-0.
