= Southern Caribbean =

Subregion of the Caribbean

- Region
- Location within the Caribbean

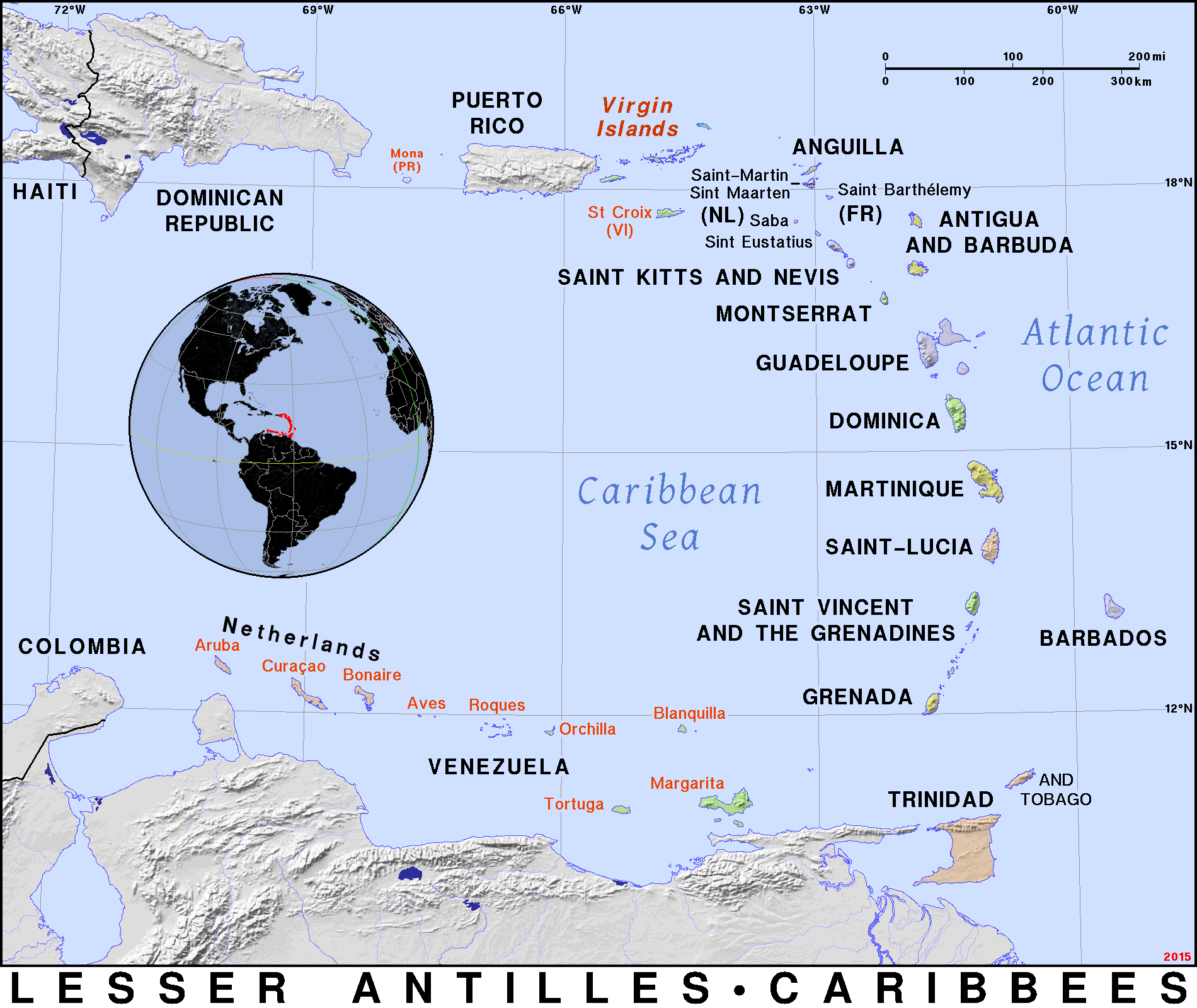
- Map of the Southern Caribbean
- Interactive map of Southern Caribbean
- Coordinates: 14°N 67°W
- Region: Caribbean
- Island States: 9: Trinidad and Tobago; Aruba (NL); Barbados; Bonaire (NL); Curaçao (NL); Dominica; Grenada; Saint Lucia; Saint Vincent and the Grenadines

Population
  - Total: 2,209.030
- Time zone: UTC−4 (AST)
  - Summer (DST): UTC−3 (ADT)

The Southern Caribbean is a group of islands that neighbor mainland South America in the West Indies. Saint Lucia lies to the north of the region, Barbados in the east, Trinidad and Tobago at its southernmost point, and Aruba at the most westerly section.

== Physical geography of the region ==
The Southern Caribbean has the Caribbean to the north and west, the Atlantic Ocean on the east, and the Gulf of Paria to the south. Most of the islands are in the Windward Islands and the Leeward Antilles.

Geologically, the islands are referred to as being a sub-continent of North America, although most islands sit on the South American continental plate. All of the Southern Caribbean islands are small, and are either volcanic or made of limestone coral, as they form at the ridge of the Caribbean and South American tectonic plates.

The majority of the islands are covered in tropical rainforests and swamps; the densest of these are in Grenada, Saint Lucia, and Tobago. Various other islands' rainforests have decreased in size over the last century due to deforestation.

Due to the close proximity of the equator, the Southern Caribbean has all year around tropical weather. Islands such as Aruba and Barbados occasionally suffer droughts, while Grenada receives a great deal of rainfall. Dry seasons on Aruba and Barbados may occur even while Grenada is receiving rain.

== Countries ==
Country	Capital	Population
Aruba	Oranjestad	103,484
Barbados	Bridgetown	294,210
Bonaire	Kralendijk	25,133
Curaçao	Willemstad	183,000
Dominica	Roseau	71,293
Grenada	St George's	103,000
Saint Lucia	Castries	170,000
Saint Vincent and the Grenadines	Kingstown	125,000
Trinidad and Tobago	Port of Spain	1,328,019

Associates:

- Colombia
- Guyana – A founding member of the Caribbean Community bloc.
- Suriname – Membership of the Caribbean Community bloc in 1995.
- Venezuela

== History ==
The Caribbean had been inhabited for about 7000 years by the Arawakan-speaking peoples, including the Kalinago, Taínos and their ancestors, who came to the Southern Caribbean on canoes from South America (primarily Venezuela). In the late 15th and early 16th centuries, European explorers and colonizers arrived. The Europeans replaced virtually the entire population of the native tribes through various means. The natives disappeared due to various reasons, including diseases brought in by Europeans to which they had no immunity, warring, enslavement and the removal of the natural resources upon which these tribes depended. European countries then made the Caribbean islands part of their respective empires. Most of these islands were disputed and fought over by European empires, such as Britain, France, the Netherlands, Portugal, and Spain:

- Britain claimed: Trinidad and Tobago, Grenada, Barbados, Saint Vincent and the Grenadines, and Saint Lucia.
- France claimed: Saint Lucia, Grenada, Saint Vincent and the Grenadines, and Trinidad and Tobago (briefly).
- The Netherlands claimed: Aruba, Bonaire, and Curaçao.
- Portugal claimed: Barbados.
- Spain claimed: Trinidad and Tobago, and Grenada (briefly).

Eventually all of the islands in the region except the Dutch islands Aruba and Netherlands Antilles were occupied by the British, who were in control from the 18th century onwards. The various islands declared their independence during the 1960s. The Dutch Caribbean islands are still part of the Netherlands and none have yet declared full independence. Trinidad & Tobago was the first nation in the Southern Caribbean to become independent in 1962, followed by Barbados in 1966. All of the islands (except the Dutch Antilles) were part of the West Indies Federation from 1958 until its dissolution in 1962.

== See also ==
- ABC islands
- Caribbean South America
- Lesser Antilles
- Spanish Main
- Western Caribbean zone
