= Empresa Nacional Portuaria (Honduras) =

The Port National Company (Empresa Nacional Portuaria, or ENP) of Honduras is a decentralized organization responsible for activities related to the administration of ships, loads, and works in the national ports. It has jurisdiction in all the maritime ports of Honduras. It was founded on October 14, 1965, under the government of President Oswaldo López Arellano.

== Functions and responsibilities ==
The ENP oversees port functions. It coordinates port activities and administration of ships that enter and leave the country, and control the storage, movement, and custody of loads, among other functions.

== Ports operated by the Port National Company ==
The ENP operates in the following ports:

- Puerto Cortés
- La Ceiba
- Puerto Castilla
- San Lorenzo

== See also ==
- Hondutel
- Empresa Nacional de Energía Eléctrica (National Electrical Energy Company)
