= Green Valley Industrial Park =

Industrial park in Honduras

Green Valley Industrial Park is a major industrial park located on the north coast of Honduras, Central America. The park is about 500-acre (2.0 km^{2}) and is operating as a free trade zone.

== Companies ==
Green Valley Industrial Park is home for several companies focusing on the textile and apparel industry. Companies include Anvil Knits Honduras(AKH), Ceiba Textiles, Roman Knit Honduras, Pride Chemicals, FCI, Premier Narrow Fabrics, Leomar and Simtex International. There are also two automotive companies, Lear Corporation and APTIV, both of them manufacturing wire harnesses and electronic components for the automotive industry.

== Transport ==
The park is about 90 minutes from Puerto Cortes, the largest port in Central America.

Public transport is available from nearby cities, special bus services provide transport from major cities like San Pedro Sula.
