= Caribbean Basin Trade Partnership Act =

- Long title: Caribbean Basin Trade Partnership Act
- Acronyms (colloquial): CBTPA
- Nicknames: Trade and Development Act of 2000
- Enacted by: the 106th United States Congress
- Effective: May 18, 2000

Citations
- Public law: 106-200
- Statutes at Large: 114 Stat. 251

Codification
- Titles amended: 19 U.S.C.: Customs Duties
- U.S.C. sections created: 19 U.S.C. ch. 23 § 3701 et seq.

Legislative history
- Introduced in the House as H.R. 434 by Phil Crane (R–IL) on February 2, 1999; Committee consideration by House International Relations, House Ways and Means, House Banking and Financial Services; Passed the House on July 16, 1999 (234-163, Roll call vote 307, via Clerk.House.gov); Passed the Senate on November 3, 1999 (76-19, Roll call vote 353, via Senate.gov); Reported by the joint conference committee on May 4, 2000; agreed to by the House on May 4, 2000 (309-110, Roll call vote 145, via Clerk.House.gov) and by the Senate on May 11, 2000 (77-19, Roll call vote 98, via Senate.gov); Signed into law by President Bill Clinton on May 18, 2000

The Caribbean Basin Trade Partnership Act (CBTPA) is a United States legislative act signed into law on May 18, 2000 by President Bill Clinton as part of the Trade and Development Act of 2000. This latter act, which also included the Africa Growth and Opportunity Act of 2000 (AGOA), was intended to advance U.S. economic and security interests by strengthening American relationships with other regions of the world then viewed to be making significant strides in terms of economic development and political reform.

The 23 independent countries of the Caribbean basin region together form the sixth largest export market for U.S. goods, totaling $19 billion and absorbing 2.7 percent of U.S. exports in 1999. However, the devastation of hurricanes Mitch and Georges in 1998 set the regional economy back. In addition, the U.S.'s signing of the NAFTA with Mexico in 1994 had caused Caribbean basin countries to lose the preferential treatment they had previously enjoyed.

The CBTPA, an expansion of the 1983 Caribbean Basin Initiative (CBI), sought to address those issues. In particular, the CBTPA extended preferential tariff treatment to textile and apparel products assembled from U.S. fabric that were previously excluded from the program. American policy makers hoped that this would encourage additional U.S. exports of cotton and yarn and U.S. investment in the region, thereby improving the global competitive position of the U.S. textile industry.

The CBTPA was also intended to encourage the diversification of CBI countries’ economies, viewed by American policymakers as a key step towards economic development that would decrease the region's dependence on aid and reduce illegal immigration into the United States as well as the trafficking of illegal drugs. American lawmakers also hoped that CBTPA would send a signal to the other countries of the Caribbean basin and elsewhere of American commitment to promoting trade-expanding policies.

== Sources ==
This page adapted from the Caribbean Basin Initiative page, maintained of the United States Department of Commerce.
