= Caribbean South America =

Subregion of South America

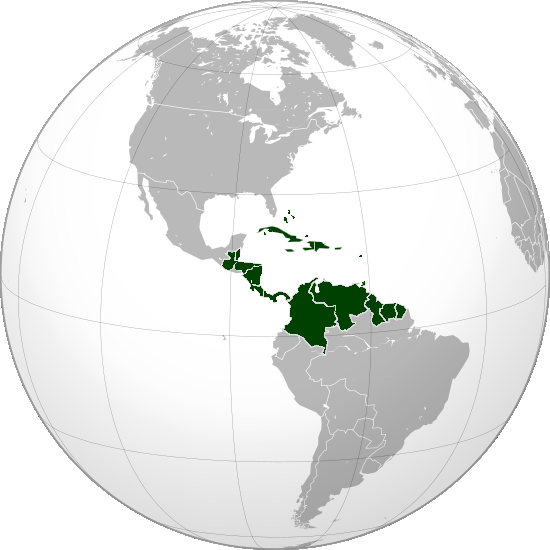
Map of the Caribbean (including Central America)

Caribbean South America is a subregion of South America that borders the Caribbean Sea, including the Southern Caribbean, consisting of the Caribbean region of Colombia and the Venezuelan Caribbean.

Significant cities and metropolitan areas with populations over 250,000 on South America's Caribbean coast include, from west to east: Cartagena (914,552), Barranquilla (2,370,753 metropolitan area), Santa Marta (499,192 district), Maracaibo (5,278,448 metropolitan area), Caracas (8,956,813 metropolitan area), Barcelona (815,141), Puerto La Cruz (454,312), and Cumaná (405,626).

By extension, The Guianas, while not bordering the Caribbean Sea directly, are commonly reckoned with this region, as well, on account of their close ties with Caribbean countries, e.g. through membership in the Association of Caribbean States, the Caribbean Community, North American CONCACAF, and even the West Indies Cricket Team.

== See also ==
- ABC islands
- Culture of the Caribbean
- Greater Caribbean
- Gulf of Paria/Trinidad and Tobago
- Regions of South America
- Transport in South America
- Community of Latin American and Caribbean States (CELAC)
- Spanish Main
