= Greater Caribbean =

Region covering the Caribbean and nearby areas

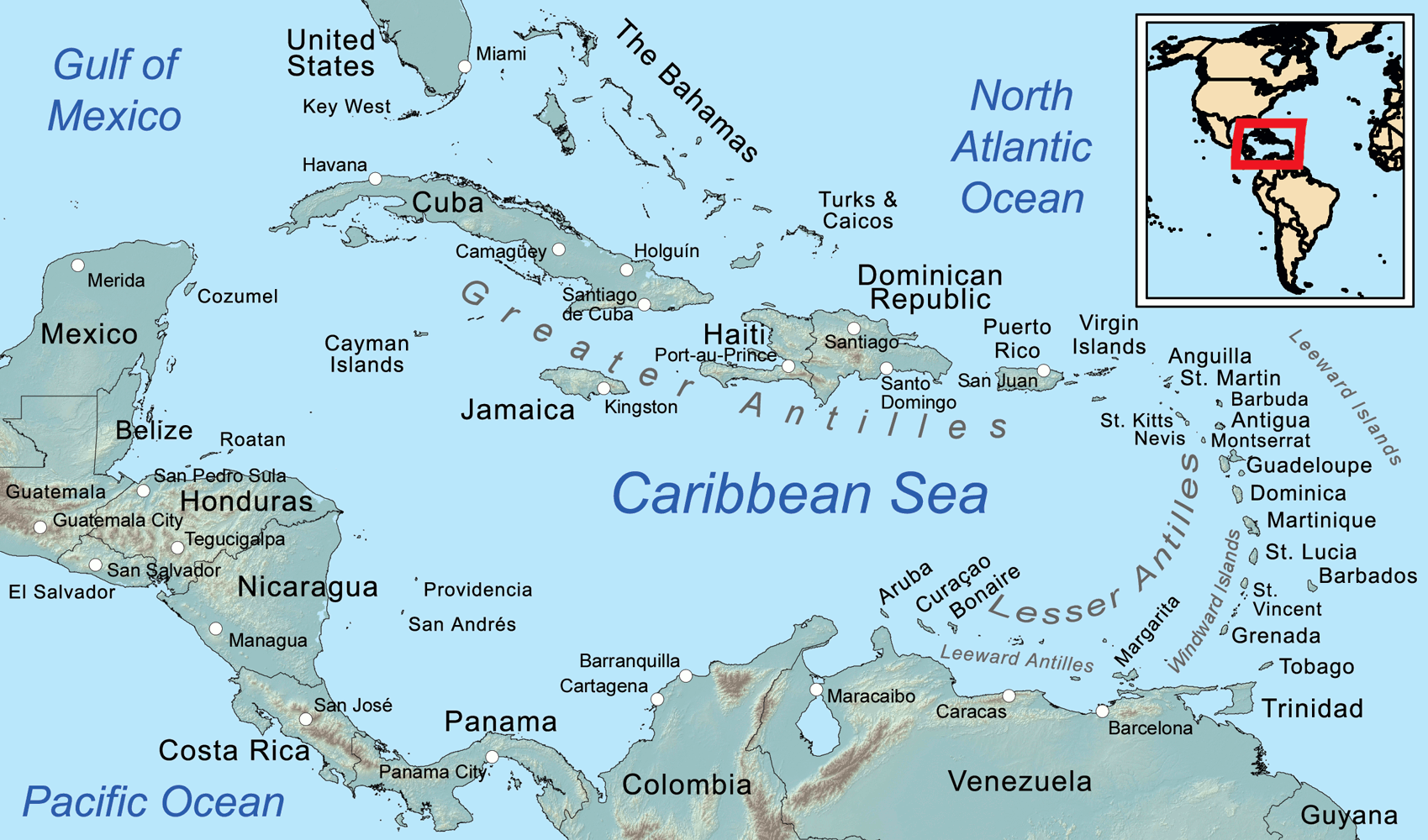
Parts of mainland North America are included in the Greater Caribbean

The Greater Caribbean or Great Caribbean is a region encompassing the Caribbean and nearby areas, such as Central America. The region has a shared history of experiencing and resisting European colonialism and slavery. In the sporting context, baseball, cricket, and association football bring most of the region together.

== Definition ==
The term Greater Caribbean has similarities to several other terms used to describe the area in and around the Caribbean Sea, such as the Caribbean Basin. The countries outside of the core Caribbean often identify more with their own local or continental identifications than with their association with the Caribbean neighborhood.

Atlantic and Gulf Rapid Reef Assessment (AGRRA) defines the region as extending from Florida and the Bahamas in the north to the northeast coast of South America in the south. By an extended definition focusing on the plantation-based slavery systems that defined the region, the area from Virginia in the north to Bahia in the south is sometimes perceived as part of the region as well.

== History ==
The region has a significant history of hurricanes and natural disasters impacting it, and historically its social issues (such as the slave trade), throughout the centuries, such as Hurricane Katrina in 2005.

=== Pre-contemporary era ===
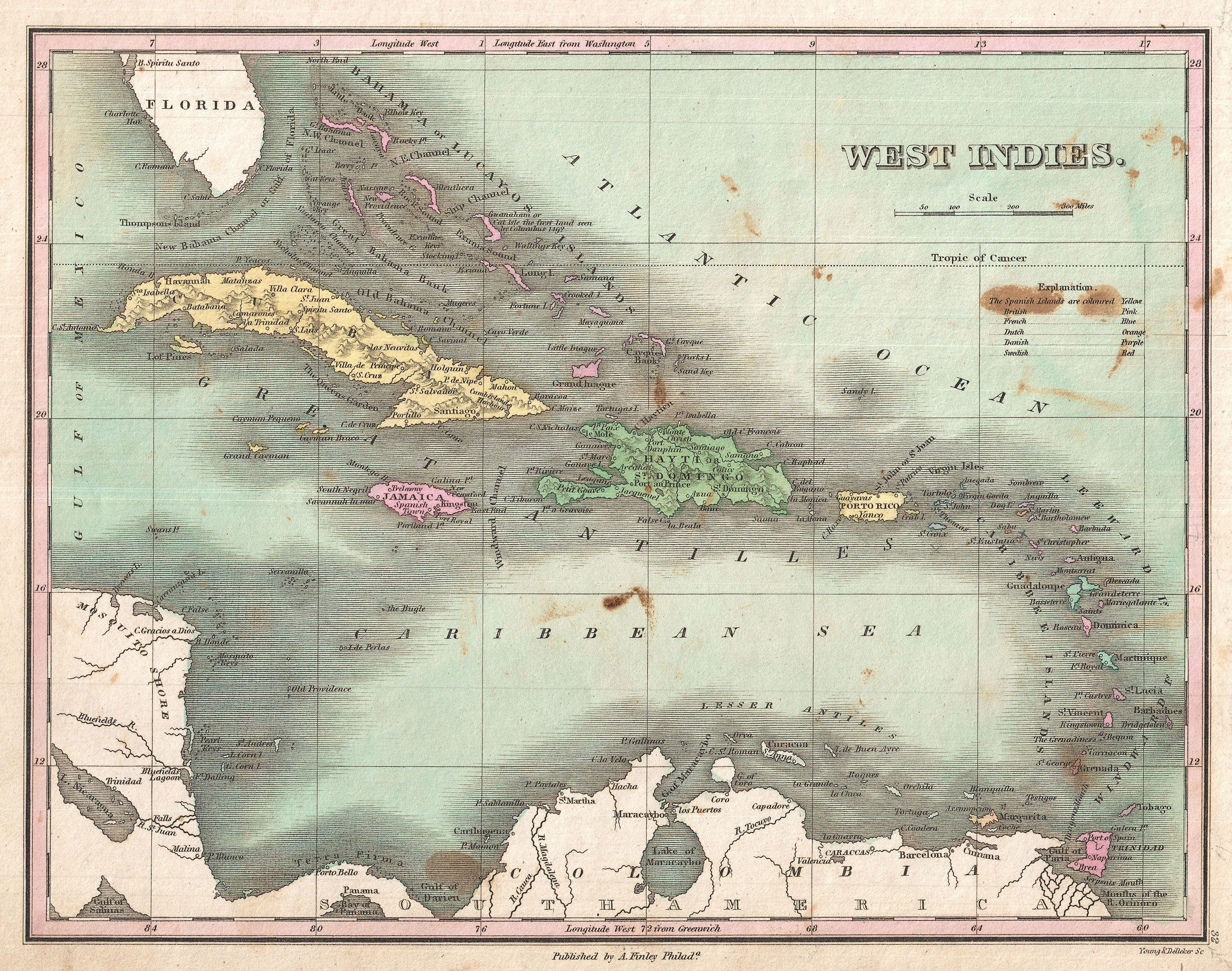
An 1827 map highlighting the various European empires in the Caribbean

By the 17th and 18th centuries, the region's post-Columbian inhabitants felt that they had improved the landscape through their building of infrastructure and taming of the wilderness.

By the turn of the 19th century, several different empires and powers made their influence felt in the region, forcing inhabitants to navigate (and flout) a wide variety of regulations and geopolitical spaces. This mixed-heritage nature of the region attracted attention from American natural historians of the time, who expressed both awe and concern at the potential of the region to bring prosperity and disruption to the existing order. During the long 19th century, the Greater Caribbean gained several new kinds of flora and fauna from the Asia-Pacific, due to increasing global maritime connectivity. It also became largely independent from colonial rule during this time, with only the British West Indies remaining colonized until the late 20th century.

The independence of the United States in the late 18th century saw its militarization and influences grow in the Greater Caribbean by the late 19th century, bringing American sport and culture to the area. This prevented association football from growing in the same way that it did in non-Caribbean Latin America. At the turn of the 20th century, racial and religious restrictions developed on migration to the region as inspired by the 1882 Chinese Exclusion Act in the United States, with groups such as the Indo-Caribbeans seeking different ways of countering or re-defining the restrictions.

=== Contemporary era ===
Organizationally, the core of the region participates in the Caribbean Community (CARICOM), while a larger section of it is represented by the Association of Caribbean States (ACS).

The smaller islands with strong luxury tourism sectors have seen higher population growth rates through labor immigration.

== See also ==
- Caribbean South America
