= Banana production in Honduras =

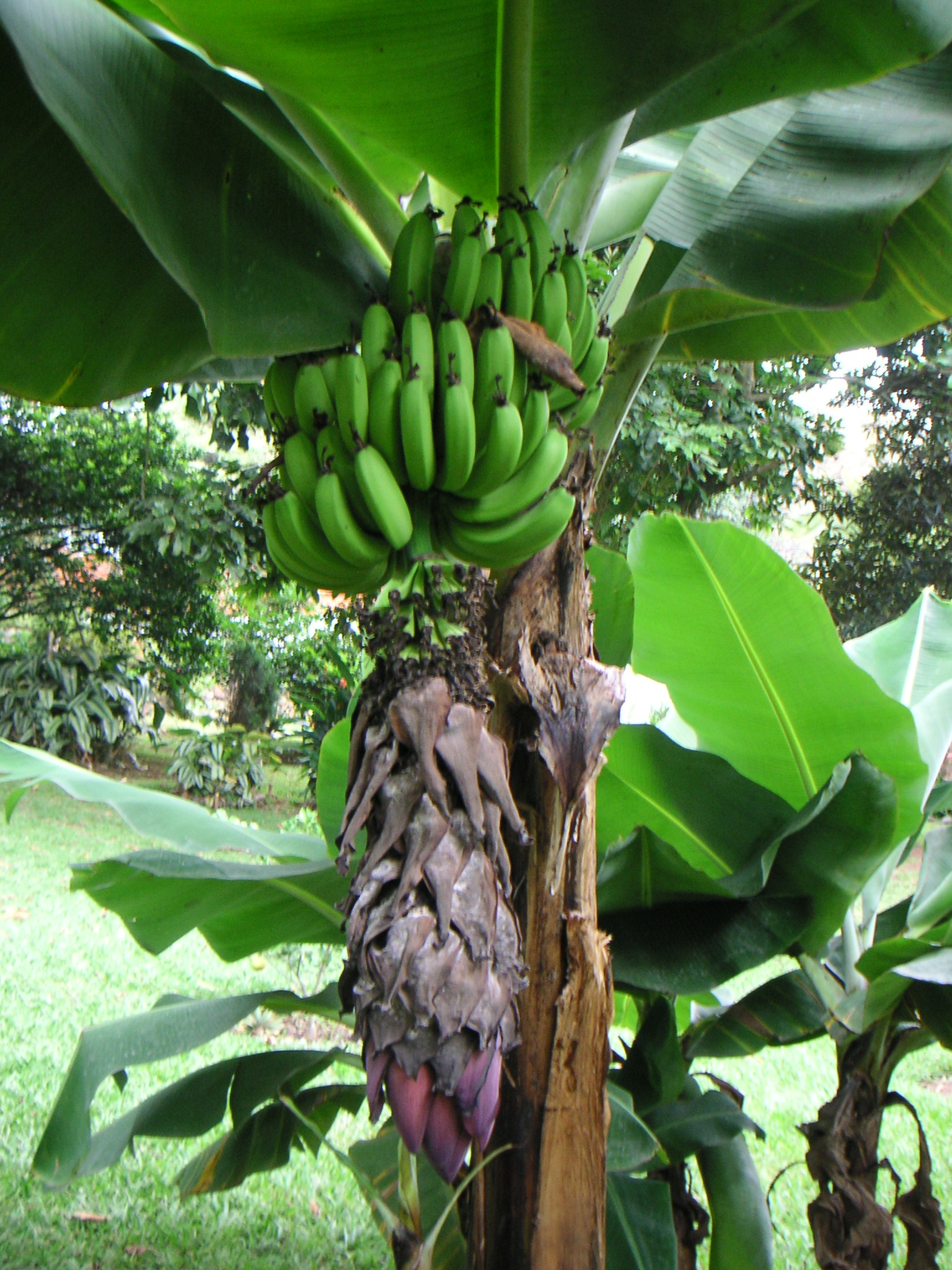
Bananas are one of Honduras's main exports

Banana production in Honduras plays an important role in the economy of Honduras. In 1992, the revenue generated from banana sales amounted to US$287 million and along with the coffee industry accounted for some 50% of exports. Honduras produced 861,000 tons of bananas in 1999. The two corporations, Chiquita Brands International and the Dole Food Company are responsible for most Honduran banana production and exports.

== History ==
Honduras began exporting bananas in the late nineteenth century, and the trade grew rapidly. Initially, in the 1870s most banana production was confined to the Bay Islands, serious production did not begin on the mainland until about 1880. The US consul reported that in 1894 goods worth almost US$350,000 (equivalent to about $13.02M in 2025) were exported to the United States through Puerto Cortés, the region's main port, and by 1903 exports had almost tripled to over US$900,000 (equivalent to about $32.25 in 2025). Much of these exports came from the growing banana trade; between 1894 and 1903 the trade had grown almost four-fold from somewhat over 600,000 stems to over two million. Shipping capacity increased as well, from four steamers a month to the United States, to 18. The choice of US destination ports expanded from just New Orleans to include Mobile, Philadelphia and Boston.

The initial growth in trade was from local banana growers. An 1899 census showed northern Honduras had some 1,000+ people in the region between Puerto Cortés and La Ceiba (and as far inland as San Pedro Sula) growing bananas, most of them on small holdings. This numerous class was able to expand production, take over communal lands and win the political struggle with cattle ranchers over land control in the early decades of the twentieth century.

In the early years of the industry, banana growers delivered their fruit to the coast where steamers from a variety of US-based shippers purchased them. However, the steamship companies gradually merged until only a handful remained, and these were soon dominated by the Vaccaro brothers of New Orleans, who in 1899 founded the Standard Fruit and Steamship Company which eventually became Dole. Because northern Honduras had a poorly developed transportation network, only farms located along major streams, and the few existing railroads in the immediate vicinity of the coast could viably participate in the export trade. Thus, the steamship companies needed to invest in a local infrastructure of railroads that would expand the area available for cultivation. By 1902 local railroad lines were being constructed on the Caribbean coast to accommodate expanding banana production.

The Honduran government, operating on Liberal economic policies that had been in place since 1876, made significant concessions of land and tax exemption to anyone who would open up agricultural land. While some Honduran producers were able to take advantage of these opportunities, the most significant concessions went to US-based companies that had the capital to purchase and develop land quickly. Companies like the Tela Railroad Company were granted land concessions in exchange for building railroad lines. In its 1912 concession, the Tela Railroad Company received 6,000 hectares (15,000 acres) of national land (that is land that was deemed vacant) for every twelve kilometres (7.5 mi) of track they laid, on the route from Tela to El Progresso, laid out in alternate blocks on both sides of the rail lines.

After the first concessions in 1912, US concerns achieved more or less complete control of the productive alluvial plains of Honduras' Atlantic coast. The area around Puerto Cortés was dominated by the Cuyamel Fruit Company, the La Ceiba region by Standard Fruit, and Tela and Trujillo were controlled by United Fruit's subsidiaries, the Tela Railroad Company and the Trujillo Railroad Company. By 1929, the United Fruit Company operated in over 650,000 acres (260,000 ha) of the country and controlled the major ports.

Initially, Honduran producers focused on growing the Gros Michel type of bananas, which had important characteristics that made them easy to store and ship and appealed to consumers in North American markets. However in the early 1920s banana-producing areas began suffering from a blight known as the "Panama Disease" which, combined with soil exhaustion from monocrop agriculture, led to a production decline in many parts of northern Honduras. The companies sought to restore production by rerouting railroads and renegotiating concessions so to bring more virgin land into cultivation. In addition they began to replace the Gros Michel with the Cavendish variety, which had some resistance to the disease.

In the 1800s, five years before independence, "the Mayor Don Juan Antonio Tomos issued a report of his visit in 1815, in which he indicated 100,000 inhabitants in the cities of Puerto Cortés, San Pedro Sula, Tela, La Ceiba, and 39 curatos and 8 villages of Caribbean blacks from countries like Jamaica, Trinidad and Tobago, Saint Lucia, Belize, and Haiti. Plus additional inhabitants near Trujillo (estimated at 10,000) for a total of 110,000 inhabitants. After independence" the population of 1826 (200,000 people) is based on the calculation made by Mr. Dionisio de Herrera, former head of the state of Honduras. By the early 1900s more 300,000 people had come to Honduras to work mainly in the booming banana cultivation and other agricultural sectors.

=== Political Implications ===
General Sierra's efforts to perpetuate himself in office led to his overthrow in 1903 by General Manuel Bonilla, who proved to be an even greater ally of the banana companies than Sierra had been. Companies gained exemptions from taxes and permission to construct wharves and roads, as well as permission to improve interior waterways and to obtain charters for new railroad construction.

At one time the American government trained the Honduran Army and the Honduran Air Force to protect the supremacy of the banana companies operating in the country.

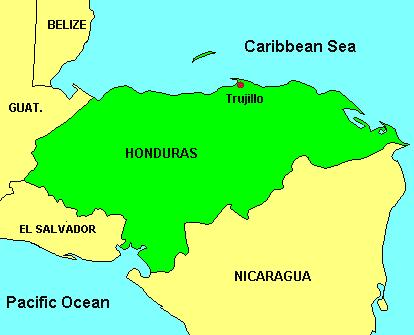
Location of Trujillo and the Bay Islands as the centre of Honduran coastal banana production

The Honduran banana industry employed a significant Garifuna workforce from the Bay Islands off Trujillo and in 1901 the government gave concessions for them to use over 7,000 hectares (17,000 acres) for banana cultivation. However in practice it was impossible to protect all of this land for its given purpose and corruption saw a local military commander in Trujillo, Colonel Gustavo Alvarez, squander 2,000 hectares (4,900 acres) of land allocated to the Garifuna and give the land to the wealthy landowners.

In 1964, Castle & Cooke bought out the Standard Fruit Company, and concentrated on the production of bananas and pineapples under the Dole label in Honduras. In September 1974, Hurricane Fifi devastated some 60% of Honduras' agricultural production, and many of the plantations had to be abandoned, seriously affecting the economy. In response, the redundant plantation workers formed the Las Isletas Peasants Enterprise, where they harvested the bananas independently and reaped the profits, producing one million boxes of bananas in 1976 and four million in 1977. Las Isletas attempted to sell the fruit directly through the Union of Banana Exporting Countries at one stage, resulting in the arrest of 200 militant members of Las Isletas and a raid on the association's headquarters under pressure from the Standard Fruit Company, who feared being outlawed by the process.

In the mid-1990s, the Honduran economy went into severe recession, which hit the banana and coffee industries hard and sending world prices soaring. Although the economy recovered significantly in 1996, the banana industry in Honduras was struck hard by the lasting impression of Hurricane Mitch in late 1998, a Category Five Hurricane considered the worst in 200 years, with winds reaching 200 miles per hour (320 km/h) and inundating land with excessive precipitation drowning many of the crops. Hurricane Mitch is believed to have destroyed over 50%, possibly as high as 80%, of the banana and coffee crops in 1998, costing an estimated US$3 billion in damage (equivalent to $6B in 2025).

Since 2000 the industry has recovered, although the country is still one of the poorest in Central America.

In 2003, the New Scientist reported that global banana production was under threat by disease and may be wiped out within ten years if preventative measures are not taken to protect against it. Scientists from the banana industry in Honduras responded to the potential crisis by implementing new large-scale breeding schemes in a new FHIA variety. This FHIA banana crop is resistant to major diseases and pests, but is also highly productive and efficient. The scheme in Honduras is financed by the multinational United Brands.

== Works cited ==
- Argueta, Mario (1989). Bananos y política: Samuel Zemurray y la Cuyamel Fruit Company en Honduras (in Spanish). Tegucigalpa, Honduras: Editorial Universitaria. OCLC 22132366.
- Chambers, Glenn Anthony (2010). Race, nation, and West Indian immigration to Honduras, 1890-1940. Baton Rouge: Louisiana State University Press. ISBN 978-0-8071-3748-2. OCLC 663112172.
- Merrill, Tim, ed. (1995). Honduras: a country study (3rd ed.). Washington, D.C.: Federal Research Division, Library of Congress. ISBN 0-8444-0836-0. OCLC 31434665. This article incorporates text from this source, which is in the public domain.
- Soluri, John (2005). Banana Cultures: Agriculture, Consumption, and Environmental Change in Honduras and the United States (1st ed.). Austin: University of Texas Press. pp. 18–23. ISBN 978-0-292-79683-6. OCLC 320324239.
