= Caribbean Basin =

Region of North America

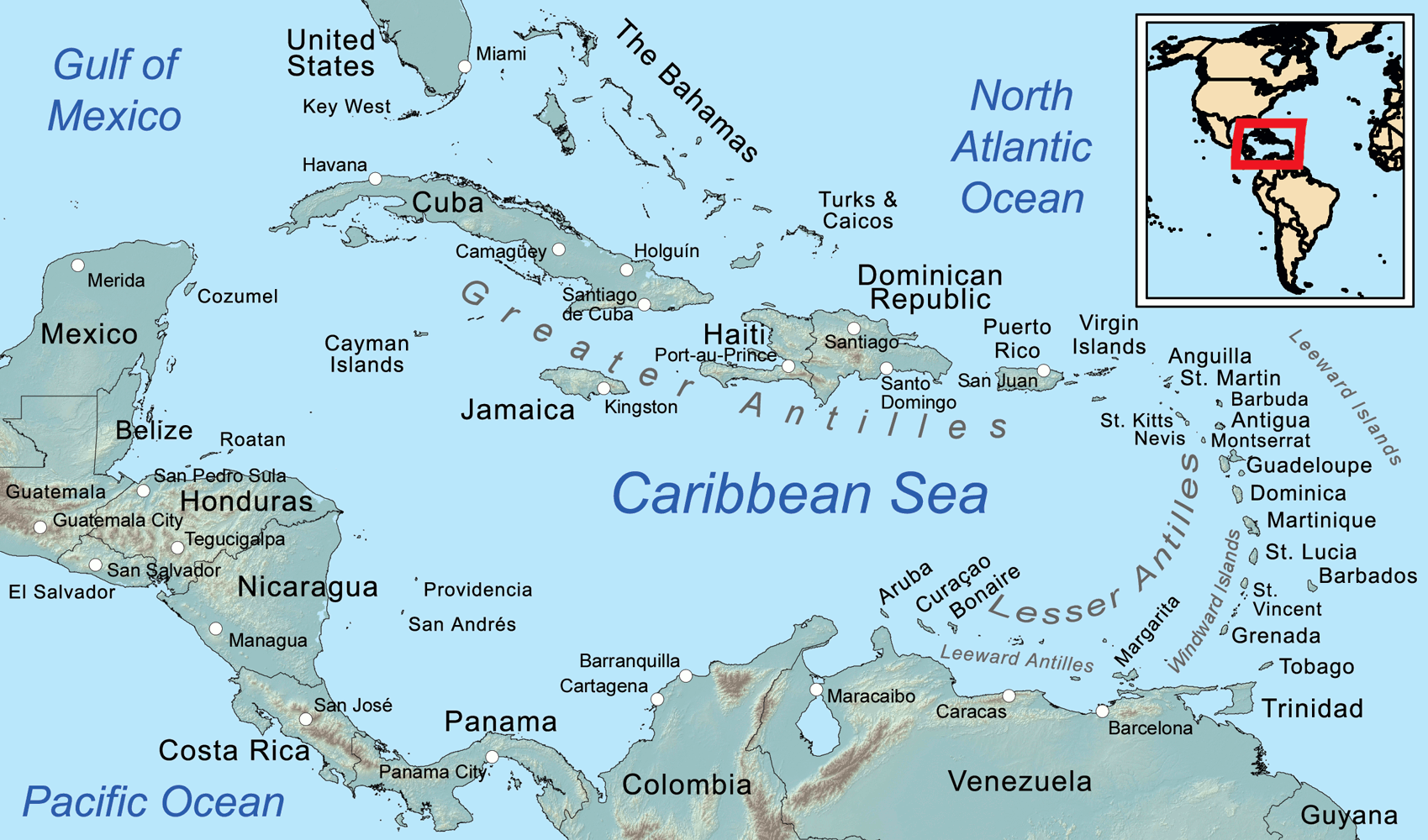
- Map of Caribbean region, including dependencies

The Caribbean Basin or Caribbean Proper (or the Caribbean Basin region) is a geopolitical term used to describe countries which generally border the Caribbean Sea. As a geopolitical concept, the term often includes the country of El Salvador, which only touches the Pacific Ocean, for its similarities to neighbouring countries. The definition has also been taken literally at times and can exclude areas such as Barbados and the Turks and Caicos Islands which also do not technically touch the Caribbean Sea.

During the Cold War, the then US President Ronald Reagan coined the term to define the region benefiting from his administration's Caribbean Basin Initiative (CBI) economic program, approved in US law in 1983. Thus, the Caribbean basin included only the countries of the Caribbean insular and Central America that met the requirements of the CBI, and Cuba and Nicaragua, which the American government viewed as politically "repressive" and "economic failure" were excluded. As a result of this US foreign policy initiative, the term "Caribbean Basin" began to be used as a geographic description in the 1980s.

Canadian historians and academics, Professor Graeme S. Mount and Professor Stephen Randall, citing historian Bruce B. Solnick, posits that:

"...one area of the modern Caribbean basin owes its heritage to the legacy of the Spanish Empire; other segments were traditionally British preserve; a third area was French, and a final area, more diminutive, was dominated by the Netherlands in the colonial years. It is not surprising, therefore, as Solnick notes, that "often the history of the region is treated solely as a function of European colonial expansion."

In the latter part of the 20th century, following the collapse of European colonialism, the Caribbean became "an American lake" which American hegemony seek to provide a form of unity in the region, though the USA never saw itself as a Caribbean nation, nor did Venezuela until the 1970s. That view is supported by the America historian and author, Professor Robert Pastor who argues that: "...all the nations in and around the Caribbean Sea seemed to have in common was a view of the United States as the "colossus of the north" and the U.S. view of them as a "backyard."

== Geographical area ==
The geographical area runs from the north in the Greater Antilles (such as Cuba, Hispaniola, Jamaica, and Puerto Rico) to the west along the Caribbean coast of the Yucatan Peninsula, in Mexico and the Caribbean coasts of Central America, continuing towards the east by the arc formed by the Lesser Antilles and to the south by the Caribbean coasts of Panama, Colombia, and Venezuela. It is customary to include Bermuda and the Bahamian Archipelago within this region, although they are located in the Atlantic Ocean outside the arc, since they share a cultural and historical legacy with other countries in the region.

=== Modern Caribbean Basin countries ===
1. Anguilla (United Kingdom)
2. Antigua and Barbuda
3. Aruba (Netherlands)
4. Bajo Nuevo Bank Colombia (Disputed by Jamaica, Nicaragua and United States)
5. Belize
6. British Virgin Islands (United Kingdom)
7. Caribbean Netherlands (Netherlands)
  1. Bonaire
  2. Sint Eustatius
  3. Saba
8. Colombia
  1. Caribbean region of Colombia
    1. Antioquia
    2. Atlántico
    3. Bolívar
    4. Cesar (Does not border the Caribbean Sea)
    5. Chocó
    6. Córdoba
    7. La Guajira
    8. Magdalena
    9. San Andrés y Providencia
    10. Sucre
9. Cayman Islands (United Kingdom)
10. Costa Rica
  1. Limón
11. Cuba
12. Curaçao (Netherlands)
13. Dominica
14. Dominican Republic
15. El Salvador
16. France
  1. Guadeloupe
  2. Martinique
17. Grenada
18. Haiti
19. Honduras
  1. Atlántida
  2. Bay Islands
  3. Colón
  4. Cortés
  5. Gracias a Dios
20. Guatemala
  1. Izabal
21. Jamaica
22. Mexico
  1. Quintana Roo
23. Montserrat (United Kingdom)
24. Navassa Island (Disputed by Haiti)
25. Nicaragua
  1. North Caribbean Coast Autonomous Region
  2. Río San Juan
  3. South Caribbean Coast Autonomous Region
26. Panama
  1. Bocas del Toro
  2. Colón Province
  3. Guna Yala
  4. Ngäbe-Buglé Comarca
  5. Veraguas
27. Puerto Rico (United States)
28. Saint Barthélemy (France)
29. Saint Kitts and Nevis
30. Saint Lucia
31. Saint Martin (France)
32. Saint Vincent and the Grenadines
33. Serranilla Bank Colombia (Disputed by Honduras, Jamaica, and United States)
34. Sint Maarten (Netherlands)
35. Trinidad and Tobago
36. United States Virgin Islands (United States)
37. Venezuela
  1. Venezuelan Caribbean
    1. Anzoátegui
    2. Aragua
    3. Carabobo
    4. Falcón
    5. Federal Dependencies of Venezuela
    6. Miranda
    7. Nueva Esparta
    8. Sucre
    9. Vargas
    10. Zulia

== See also ==
- Caribbean Basin Initiative
- Caribbean Basin Trade Partnership Act
- Greater Caribbean
