= Death squad =

Armed group that conducts extrajudicial killings

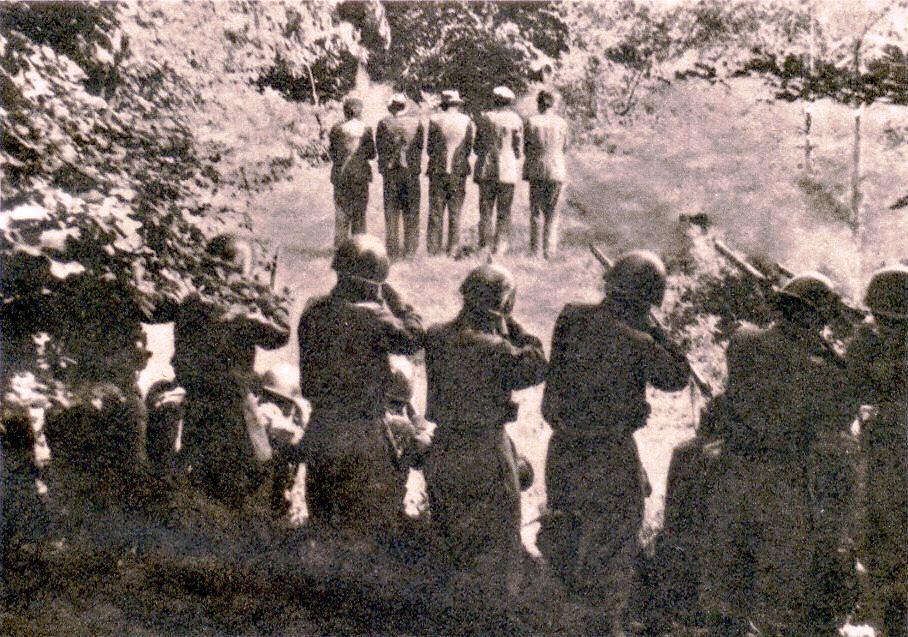
Italian soldiers shooting Slovenian hostages. 31 July 1942

A death squad is an armed group whose primary activity is carrying out extrajudicial killings and murders against a group of people. They are usually deployed by governments or other entities to instill terror in targeted groups.

Other violence, such as rape, torture, arson, or bombings, may be carried out alongside murders. Death squads usually operate in the context of state-sanctioned violence, typically to repress dissent or otherwise lawful activity.

== History ==
Although the term "death squad" was not widely used until the activities of such groups became widely known in Central and South America during the 1970s and 80s, death squads have been employed under different guises throughout history. The term was first used by the fascist political party and paramilitary organization the Iron Guard in the Kingdom of Romania. It officially installed Iron Guard death squads in 1936 in order to kill political enemies. It was also used during the Battle of Algiers by Paul Aussaresses.

=== Cold War usage ===
In Latin America, death squads first appeared in Brazil where a group called Esquadrão da Morte (literally "Death Squad") emerged in the 1960s; they subsequently spread to Argentina and Chile in the 1970s, and they were later used in Central America during the 1980s. Argentina used extrajudicial killings as a way of crushing the liberal and communist opposition to the military junta during the "Dirty War" of the 1970s. For example, Alianza Anticomunista Argentina was a far-right death squad mainly active during the "Dirty War". The Chilean military regime of 1973–1990 also committed such killings. See Operation Condor for examples.

During the Salvadoran Civil War, death squads became notorious following the assassination of Archbishop Óscar Romero by a sniper as he said Mass inside a convent chapel on 24 March 1980. In December 1980, three American nuns, Ita Ford, Dorothy Kazel, and Maura Clarke, and a lay worker, Jean Donovan, were gang raped and murdered by a military unit later found to have been carrying out orders. Death squads were instrumental in killing hundreds of real and suspected Communists. Priests who were spreading liberation theology, such as Father Rutilio Grande, were also targeted. The murderers in this case were found to have been soldiers from the Salvadoran military, which was receiving U.S. funding and had U.S. military advisors during the Carter administration. These events prompted outrage in the U.S. and led to a temporary ending of military aid at the end of his presidency.

Honduras also had death squads active through the 1980s, the most notorious of which was the army unit Battalion 316. Hundreds of people, teachers, politicians, and union leaders were assassinated by government-backed forces. Battalion 316 received substantial training from the United States Central Intelligence Agency.

In Southeast Asia, extrajudicial killings were conducted by both sides during the Vietnam War.

=== Use in the 2010s ===
As of 2010, death squads have continued to be active in Chechnya.

== By continent ==
=== Africa ===
==== Egypt ====
The Iron Guard of Egypt was a pro-palace political movement or a secret palace organization of the Kingdom of Egypt which assassinated Farouk of Egypt's enemies or a secret unit with a licence to kill, which was believed to personally take orders from Farouk. It was involved in several deadly incidents.

==== Ivory Coast ====
Death squads are reportedly active in this country.

This has been condemned by the US but appears to be difficult to stop. Moreover, there is no proof as to who is behind the killings.

In an interview with the Pan-African magazine "Jeune Afrique", Laurent Gbagbo accused one of the opposition leaders, Alassane Ouattara (ADO), to be the main organizer of the media frenzy around his wife's involvement in the killing squads. He also successfully sued and won, in French courts, in cases against the French newspapers that made the accusations.

==== Kenya ====
In December 2014, Kenyan Anti-Terrorism Police Unit officers confessed to Al Jazeera that they were responsible for almost 500 of the extrajudicial killings. The murders reportedly totalled several hundred homicides every year. They included the assassination of Abubaker Shariff Ahmed "Makaburi", an Al-Shabaab associate from Kenya, who was among 21 Islamic extremists allegedly murdered by the Kenyan police force since 2012. According to the agents, they resorted to the killing after the Kenya Police could not successfully prosecute terror suspects. In doing so, the officers indicated that they were acting on the direct orders of Kenya's National Security Council, which consisted of the Kenyan President, Deputy President, Chief of the Defence Forces, Inspector General of Police, National Security Intelligence Service Director, Cabinet Secretary of Interior, and Principal Secretary of Interior. Kenyan President Uhuru Kenyatta and the National Security Council of Kenya members denied operating an extrajudicial assassination program. Additionally, the officers suggested that Western security agencies provided intelligence for the program, including the whereabouts and activities of government targets- alleging that the British government supplied further logistics in the form of equipment and training. One Kenyan officer within the council's General Service Unit also indicated that Israeli instructors taught them how to kill. The head of the International Bar Association, Mark Ellis, cautioned that any such involvement by foreign nations would constitute a breach of international law. The United Kingdom and Israel denied participation in the Kenyan National Security Council's reported death squads, with the UK Foreign Office indicating that it had approached the Kenyan authorities over the charges.

==== South Africa ====
Beginning in the 1960s, the African National Congress (ANC), their ally, the South African Communist Party (SACP), and the Pan-Africanist Congress (PAC), began a campaign to topple South Africa's National Party (NP)-controlled Apartheid Government. Both the ANC's armed wing, uMkhonto weSizwe (MK), and South African security forces routinely engaged in bombings and targeted killings, both at home and abroad. Particularly notorious death squads used by the apartheid government included the Civil Cooperation Bureau (CCB) and the South African Police's counter-insurgency unit C10, commanded by Colonel Eugene de Kock and based at the Vlakplaas farm west of Pretoria, itself also a center for torture of prisoners.

After the end of Apartheid, death squad violence conducted by both the National Party and the ANC was investigated by the Truth and Reconciliation Commission.

==== Uganda ====
From 1971 to 1979, Ugandan dictator Idi Amin set up death squads to murder enemies of the state.

=== North America ===
==== Dominican Republic ====
Rafael Trujillo's Dominican government employed a death squad, known as la 42 and led by Miguel Angel Paulino. Paulino would often drive a red Packard called the Carro de la Muerte (Death Car). During the 12-year regime of Joaquín Balaguer, the Frente Democrático Anticomunista y Antiterrorista, also known as La Banda Colorá, continued the practices of la 42. Balaguer was also known for directing the SIM to kill Haitians in the Parsley massacre.

==== Haiti ====
The Tonton Macoute was a paramilitary force created in 1959 by Haitian dictator François "Papa Doc" Duvalier, that murdered 30,000 to 60,000 Haitians.

==== Mexico ====
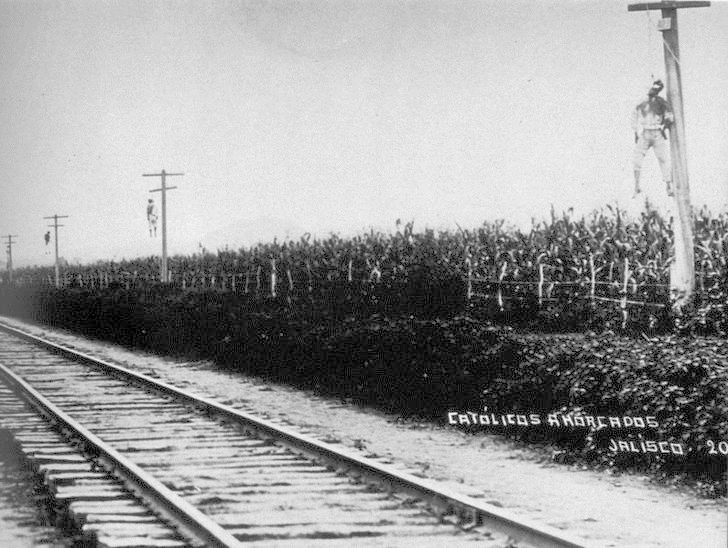
Cristero rebels publicly hanged on telegraph poles in Jalisco, Mexico. The bodies often remained on the poles until the pueblo or town renounced public religious practice.

In a way similar to the American Indian Wars, the Centralist Republic of Mexico struggled against Apache raids. Between 1835 and 1837, only 15 years after the Mexican War of Independence and in the midst of the Texan Revolution, the Mexican state governments of Sonora and Chihuahua (that border with the U.S. states of Texas, New Mexico and Arizona ) put a bounty on the Apache bands that were in the area. In the case of Chihuahua the bounty attracted "bounty hunters" from the United States, that were often Anglo Americans, runaway slaves and even from other Indian tribes. It was paid based on Apache scalps, 100 pesos per warrior, 50 pesos per woman, and 25 pesos per child. As historian Donald E. Worcester wrote: "The new policy attracted a diverse group of men, including Anglos, runaway slaves led by Seminole John Horse, and Indians — Kirker used Delawares and Shawnees; others, such as Terrazas, used Tarahumaras; and Seminole Chief Coacoochee led a band of his own people who had fled from Indian Territory.".

===== After the Mexican Revolution =====
For more than seven decades following the Mexican Revolution, Mexico was a one-party state ruled by the Partido Revolucionario Institucional (PRI). During this era, death squad tactics were routinely used against suspected enemies of the state.

During the 1920s and 1930s, the PRI's founder, President Plutarco Elías Calles, used death squads against Mexico's Roman Catholic majority in the Cristero War. Calles explained his reasons in a private telegram to the Mexican Ambassador to the French Third Republic, Alberto J. Pani. "...Catholic Church in Mexico is a political movement, and must be eliminated ... free of religious hypnotism which fools the people... within one year without the sacraments, the people will forget the faith..."

Calles and his adherents used the Mexican Army and police, as well as paramilitary forces like the Red Shirts, to abduct, torture, and execute priests, nuns, and actively religious laity. Mexican Catholics were also routinely hanged from telegraph poles along the railroad lines. Prominent victims of the Mexican State's campaign against Catholicism include the teenager Jose Sanchez del Rio, the Jesuit priest Father Miguel Pro, and the Christian Pacifist Anacleto González Flores (see also Saints of the Cristero War).

In response, an armed revolt against the Mexican State, the Cristero War, began in 1927. Composed largely of peasant volunteers and commanded by retired General Enrique Gorostieta Velarde, the Cristeros were also responsible for atrocities. Among them were the assassination of former Mexican President Álvaro Obregón, train robberies, and violent attacks against rural teachers. The uprising largely ended after the Holy See and the Mexican State negotiated a compromise agreement. Refusing to lay down his arms despite offers of amnesty, General Gorostieta was killed in action by the Mexican Army in Jalisco on 2 June 1929. Following the cessation of hostilities, more than 5,000 Cristeros were summarily executed by Mexican security forces. The events of the Cristero War are depicted in the 2012 film For Greater Glory.

===== During the Cold War =====
During the 1960s, 1970s, 1980s, and 1990s, death squads continued to be used against anti-PRI activists, both Marxists and social conservatives. One example of this is the 1968 Tlatelolco massacre, in which an anti-regime protest rally was attacked by security forces in Mexico City. After this event, paramilitary groups like "Los Halcones" (The Hawks) and the "Brigada blanca" (White brigade) were used to attack, hunt and exterminate political dissidents.

Allegations have been made by both journalists and American law enforcement of collusion between senior PRI statesmen and the Mexican drug cartels. It has even been alleged that, under PRI rule, no drug traffickers were ever successful without the permission of the Mexican State. If the same drug trafficker fell from favor, however, Mexican law enforcement would be ordered to move against their operation, as happened to Pablo Acosta Villarreal in 1987. Drug lords like Ernesto Fonseca Carrillo, Rafael Caro Quintero, and Juan José Esparragoza Moreno would use the Dirección Federal de Seguridad as a death squad to kill Drug Enforcement Administration agents and Federal Judicial Police commanders who investigated or destroyed drug plantations in the 1970s and 1980s in Mexico. One example was the murder (after torture) of DEA agent Kiki Camarena, who was killed in Guadalajara for his part in the Rancho Bufalo raid. The DFS also organized death squads to kill journalists including Manuel Buendía who was killed by orders of DFS chief José-Antonio Zorrilla.

===== Regime change and "drug war tactics" =====
By the early 1990s, the PRI started to lose the grip on its absolute political power, however, its corruption became so pervasive that Juárez Cartel boss Amado Carrillo Fuentes was even able to purchase a window in Mexico's air defense system. During this period, his airplanes were permitted to smuggle narcotics into the United States without the interference of the Mexican Air Force. As a result, Carillo Fuentes became known as "The Lord of the Skies." During the 1990s drug cartels were on the rise in Mexico and groups like the Gulf Cartel would form death squads like Los Zetas to suppress, control, and uproot rival cartel factions.

The PRI also used death squad tactics against the Zapatista Army of National Liberation in the Chiapas conflict. In 1997, forty-five people were killed by Mexican security forces in Chenalhó, Chiapas.

In 2000, however, during an internal power struggle between former President Carlos Salinas de Gortari and President Zedillo, the PRI was peacefully voted out from power in the 2000 Mexican general election, until 2013 when they partially regained their influence and power, only to lose again in the 2018 Mexican general election. It is also alleged that, during the time they first lost the presidency, some of the most powerful PRI members were supporting and protecting drug cartels that they used as death squads against their criminal and political rivals, with it being one of the real reasons the National Action Party government accepted to start the Mexican drug war against the Cartels. However, it is also alleged that during this period of time the turmoil of war has been used by the parties in power to exterminate even more political dissidents, activists and their own rivals. An example of this is the case of the 2014 forced disappearance and assassination of 43 activist rural students from the Ayotzinapa Teachers' College, in the hands of police officers colluded with the Guerreros Unidos drug cartel. Six years later in 2020, it was confirmed that members from the Mexican Army base in town had worked with police and gang members to kidnap the students. The Sinaloa Cartel has been known for having enforcer death squads like Gente Nueva, Los Ántrax, and enforcers forming their own death squads. From 2009 to 2012, the Jalisco New Generation Cartel under the name Los Matazetas did massacres in the states of Veracruz and Tamaulipas with their intention to remove the rival Los Zetas Cartel. One example was the Boca del Rio massacre in 2011, where 35 corpses were found under a bridge in trucks covered with paper bags. Gente Nueva was accused of collaborating with the organization.

==== United States ====
During the California Gold Rush, the state government between 1850 and 1859 financed and organized militia units to hunt down and kill Indigenous Californians. Between 1850 and 1852 the state appropriated almost one million dollars for the activities of these militias, and between 1854 and 1859 the state appropriated another $500,000, almost half of which was reimbursed by the federal government. By one estimate, at least 4,500 Californian Indians were killed in the California genocide between 1849 and 1870. Contemporary historian Benjamin Madley has documented the numbers of Californian Indians killed between 1846 and 1873; he estimates that during this period at least 9,492 Californian Indians were killed by non-Indians. Most of the deaths took place in what he defined as more than 370 massacres (defined as the "intentional killing of five or more disarmed combatants or largely unarmed noncombatants, including women, children, and prisoners, whether in the context of a battle or otherwise"). Some scholars contend that the state financing of these militias, as well as the US government's role in other massacres in California, such as the Bloody Island and Yontoket Massacres, in which up to 400 or more natives were killed in each massacre, constitutes acts of genocide against the native people of California.

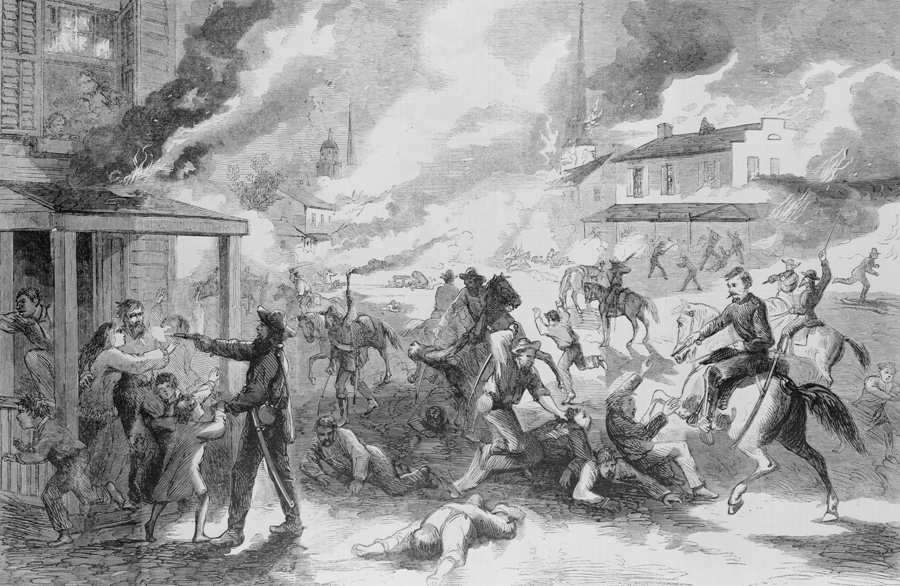
Quantrill's 1863 raid burned the town of Lawrence and killed 164 defenders.

Beginning in the 1850s, pro-slavery Bushwhackers and anti-slavery Jayhawkers waged war against each other in the Kansas Territory. Due to the horrific atrocities committed by both sides against civilians, the territory was dubbed "Bleeding Kansas". After the American Civil War began, the fraternal bloodshed increased.

The most infamous atrocity which was committed in Kansas during the American Civil War was the Lawrence Massacre. A large force group of Partisan Rangers who were led by William Clarke Quantrill and Bloody Bill Anderson and affiliated with the Confederacy attacked and burned down the pro-Union town of Lawrence, Kansas in retaliation for the Jayhawkers' earlier destruction of Osceola, Missouri. The Bushwhackers shot down nearly 150 unarmed men and boys.

During the Reconstruction era, embittered Confederate veterans supported the Ku Klux Klan and similar vigilante organizations throughout the American South. The Klan and its counterparts terrorized and lynched African Americans, northern carpetbaggers, and Southern "scalawags". This was often done with the unofficial support of the Democratic Party leadership. Historian Bruce B. Campbell has called the KKK, "one of the first proto-death squads". Campbell alleges that the difference between it and modern-day death-squads is the fact that the Ku Klux Klan was composed of members of a defeated regime rather than members of the ruling government. "Otherwise, in its murderous intent, its links to private elite interests, and its covert nature, it very closely resembles modern-day death squads."

President Ulysses S. Grant pushed the Ku Klux Klan Act through Congress in 1871 and called on the United States Army to help federal officials the arrest and breakup of the Klan. 600 Klansmen were convicted, and 65 men were sent to prison for as long as five years.

In June 2020, Los Angeles County Deputy Sheriff Austreberto "Art" Gonzalez filed a claim against the county, claiming that approximately twenty percent of the deputies operating in the Los Angeles County Sheriff's Department's Compton station belonged to a secret death squad. Gonzales alleges that the group, named "The Executioners", carried out multiple extrajudicial killings over the years and that members followed initiation rituals, including being tattooed with skulls and Nazi imagery.

==== Central America ====
===== El Salvador =====
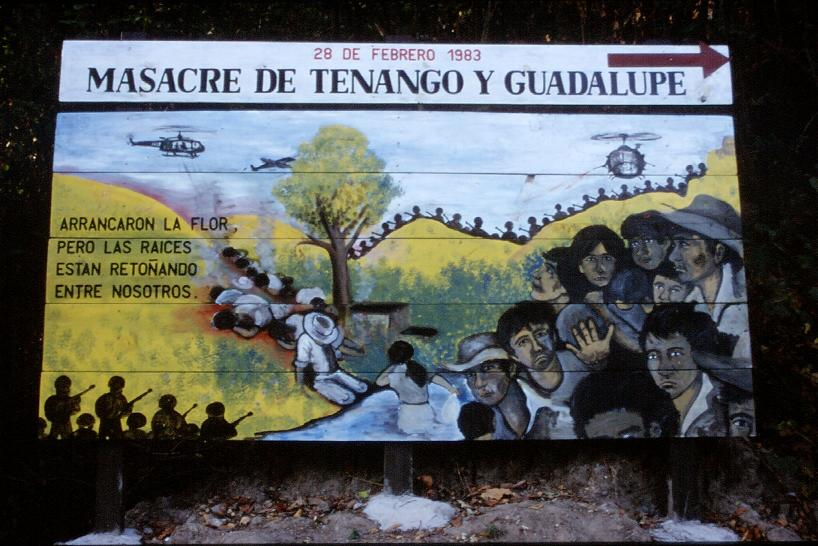
A billboard serving as a reminder of one of many massacres that occurred during the civil war

During the Salvadoran civil war, death squads (known in Spanish by the name of Escuadrón de la Muerte, "Squadron of Death") achieved notoriety when a sniper assassinated Archbishop Óscar Romero while he was performing Mass in March 1980. In December 1980, three American nuns and a lay worker were gangraped and murdered by a military unit later found to have been acting on specific orders. Death squads were instrumental in killing thousands of peasants and activists. Funding for the squads came primarily from right-wing Salvadoran businessmen and landowners. Because the death squads involved were found to have been soldiers of the Salvadoran Armed Forces, which were receiving U.S. arms, funding, training and advice during the Carter, Reagan and George H. W. Bush administrations, these events prompted some outrage in the U.S. Human rights activists criticized U.S. administrations for denying Salvadoran government links to the death squads. Veteran Human Rights Watch researcher Cynthia J. Arnson writes that "particularly during the years 1980–1983 when the killing was at its height (numbers of killings could reach as far as 35,000), assigning responsibility for the violence and human rights abuses was a product of the intense ideological polarization in the United States. The Reagan administration downplayed the scale of abuse as well as the involvement of state actors. Because of the level of denial, as well as the extent of U.S. involvement with the Salvadoran military and security forces, the U.S. role in El Salvador- what was known about death squads, when it was known, and what actions the United States did or did not take to curb their abuses- became an important part of El Salvador's death squad story." Some death squads, such as Sombra Negra, are still operating in El Salvador.

The Salvadoran Army's U.S.-trained Atlácatl Battalion was responsible for the El Mozote massacre where more than 800 civilians were murdered, over half of them children, the El Calabozo massacre, and the murders of six Jesuits in 1989.

===== Honduras =====
Honduras had death squads active through the 1980s, the most notorious of which was Battalion 3–16. Hundreds of people, teachers, politicians, and union bosses were assassinated by government-backed forces. Battalion 316 received substantial support and training from the United States Central Intelligence Agency. At least 19 members were School of the Americas graduates. Seven members, including Billy Joya, later played important roles in the administration of President Manuel Zelaya as of mid-2006. Following the 2009 coup d'état, former Battalion 3–16 member Nelson Willy Mejía Mejía became Director-General of Immigration and Billy Joya was de facto President Roberto Micheletti's security advisor. Another former Battalion 3–16 member, Napoleón Nassar Herrera, was high Commissioner of Police for the north-west region under Zelaya and under Micheletti, and also became a Secretary of Security spokesperson "for dialogue" under Micheletti. Zelaya claimed that Joya had reactivated the death squad, with dozens of government opponents having been murdered since the ascent of the Michiletti and Lobo governments.

===== Guatemala =====
Throughout the Guatemalan Civil War, both military and "civilian" governments utilized death squads as a counterinsurgency strategy. The use of "death squads" as a government tactic became particularly widespread after 1966. Throughout 1966 and the first three months of 1967, within the framework of what military commentators referred to as "el-contra terror", government forces killed an estimated 8,000 civilians accused of "subversive" activity. This marked a turning point in the history of the Guatemalan security apparatus and brought about a new era in which mass murder of both real and suspected subversives by government "death squads" became a common occurrence in the country. A noted Guatemalan sociologist estimated the number of government killings between 1966 and 1974 at approximately 5,250 a year (for a total death toll of approximately 42,000 during the presidencies of Julio César Méndez Montenegro and Carlos Arana Osorio). Killings by both official and unofficial security forces would climax in the late 1970s and early 1980s under the presidencies of Fernando Romeo Lucas García and Efraín Ríos Montt, with over 18,000 documented killings in 1982 alone.

Greg Grandin claims that "Washington, of course, publicly denied its support for paramilitarism, but the practice of political disappearances took a great leap forward in Guatemala in 1966 with the birth of a death squad created, and directly supervised, by U.S. security advisors." An upsurge in rebel activity in Guatemala convinced the US to provide increased counterinsurgency assistance to Guatemala's security apparatus in the mid to late 1960s. Documents released in 1999 details how United States military and police advisers had encouraged and assisted Guatemalan military officials in the use of repressive techniques, including helping establish a "safe house" from within the presidential palace as a location to coordinate counter insurgency activities. In 1981, it was reported by Amnesty International that this same "safe house" was in use by Guatemalan security officials to coordinate counterinsurgency activities involving the use of the "death squads."

According to a victim's brother, Mirtala Linares "He wouldn't tell us anything; he claimed they hadn't captured [Sergio], that he knew nothing of his whereabouts – and that maybe my brother had gone as an illegal alien to the United States! That was how he answered us."

===== Nicaragua =====
Throughout the Ortega government, starting in 2006, but escalating with the 2018–2020 Nicaraguan protests, Sandinista National Liberation Front government has employed death squads also known as "Turbas" or militia groups armed and aided by the National Police to attack pro-democracy protesters. The government's crackdown of lethal force was condemned by the international community, the Organization of American States, Human Rights Watch, and the local and international Catholic Church.

=== South America ===
==== Argentina ====
Amnesty International reports that "the security forces in Argentina first started using 'death squads' in late 1973. One example was Alianza Anticomunista Argentina, a far-right death squad mainly active during the 'Dirty War'. By the time military rule ended in 1983, some 1,500 people had been killed directly by 'death squads', and over 9,000 named people and many more undocumented victims had been 'disappeared'—kidnapped and murdered secretly—according to the officially appointed National Commission on Disappeared People (CONADEP).

==== Brazil ====
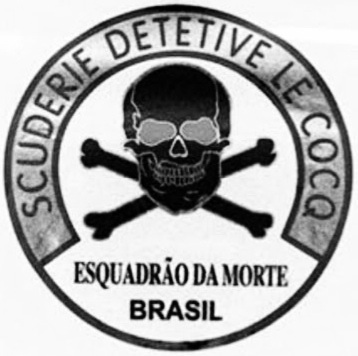
Esquadrão da Morte

The Esquadrão da Morte ("Death Squad" in Portuguese) was a paramilitary organization that emerged in the late 1960s during the Brazilian military dictatorship. It was the first group to have received the name "Death Squad" in Latin America, but its actions resembled traditional vigilantism as most executions were not exclusively politically related. The greater share of the political executions during the 21 years of military dictatorship (1964–1985) were carried out by the Brazilian Armed Forces itself. The purpose of the original "Death Squad" was, with the consent of the military government, to persecute, torture and kill suspected criminals (marginais) regarded as dangerous to society. It began in the former state of Guanabara led by Detective Mariel Mariscot, one of the "Twelve Golden Men of Rio de Janeiro's Police", and from there it spread throughout Brazil in the 1970s. In general, its members were politicians, members of the judiciary, and police officials. As a rule, these groups were financed by members of the business community.

In the 1970s and 1980s, several other organizations were modeled after the 1960s Esquadrão da Morte. The most famous such organization is Scuderie Detetive Le Cocq (English: Shield of Detective Le Cocq), named after deceased Detective Milton Le Cocq. The group was particularly active in the Brazilian southeastern states of Guanabara and Rio de Janeiro, and remains active in the state of Espírito Santo. In the state of São Paulo, death squads and individual gunmen called justiceiros were pervasive and executions almost were exclusively the work of off-duty policemen. In 1983, a police officer nicknamed "Cabo Bruno" was convicted of murdering more than 50 victims.

The "Death Squads" active under the rule of the military dictatorship continue as a cultural legacy of the Brazilian police. In the 2000s, police officers remain linked with death squad-type executions. In 2003, roughly 2,000 extrajudicial murders occurred in São Paulo and Rio de Janeiro, with Amnesty International claiming the numbers are likely far higher. Brazilian politician Flávio Bolsonaro, the son of Brazilian ex-President Jair Bolsonaro, was accused of having ties to death squads.

==== Chile ====
One of the most notorious murder gangs operated by the Chilean Army was the Caravan of Death, whose members travelled by helicopter throughout Chile between 30 September and 22 October 1973. During this foray, members of the squad ordered or personally carried out the execution of at least 75 individuals held in Army custody in these garrisons. According to the NGO Memoria y Justicia, the squad killed 26 in the South and 71 in the North, making a total of 97 victims. Augusto Pinochet was indicted in December 2002 in this case, but he died four years later without having been convicted. The trial, however, is on-going as of September 2007, other militaries and a former military chaplain having been indicted in this case. On 28 November 2006, Víctor Montiglio, charged of this case, ordered Pinochet's house arrest According to the Chilean Government's own Truth and Reconciliation (Rettig) report, 2,279 people were killed in the operations of Pinochet's regime. In June 1999, judge Juan Guzmán Tapia ordered the arrest of five retired generals.

==== Colombia ====
The United States supported death squads in Colombia, El Salvador and Guatemala during the 1980s. In 1993, Amnesty International reported that clandestine military units began covertly operating as death squads in 1978. According to the report, throughout the 1980s political killings rose to a peak of 3,500 in 1988, averaging some 1,500 victims per year since then, and "over 1,500 civilians are also believed to have "disappeared" since 1978." The AUC, formed in 1997, was the most prominent paramilitary group.

According to a 2014 report published by Human Rights Watch (HRW) on Buenaventura, a port town in Colombia, "entire neighborhoods were dominated by powerful paramilitary successor groups" HRW reports that the groups "restrict residents' movements, recruit their children, extort businesses, and routinely engage in horrific acts of violence against anyone who defies their will." It is reported that scores of people have been "disappeared" from the town over the years. Bodies are dismembered before they are disposed of and residents have reported the existence of casas de pique, "chop-up houses" where people are slaughtered. Many residents have fled and are considered to have been "forcibly displaced": 22,028 residents fled in 2011, 15,191 in 2012, and 13,468 between January and October 2013.

In Colombia, the terms "death squads", "paramilitaries" or "self-defense groups" have been used interchangeably and otherwise, referring to either a single phenomenon, also known as paramilitarism, or to different but related aspects of the same. There are reports that Los Pepes, the death squad led by brothers Fidel and Carlos Castaño, had ties to some members of the Colombian National Police, especially the Search Bloc (Bloque de Búsqueda) unit.

A report from the country's public prosecutors office at the end of 2009 reported the number of 28,000 disappeared by paramilitary and guerrilla groups. As of 2008 only 300 corpses were identified and 600 in 2009.

At least 40% of the national legislature are said to have ties to paramilitary groups. In August 2018, prosecutors in Colombia charged 13 Chiquita brands with supporting the right wing death squad that killed hundreds in the Urabá Antioquia region between 1996 and 2004. Salvatore Mancuso, a jailed paramilitary leader, has accused Del Monte, Dole and Chiquita of funding right wing death squads. Chiquita was fined $25 million after admitting they had paid $1.7 million to paramilitaries over six years; the reason for the payments remains a matter of dispute, with Chiquita claiming the money was routine extortion money paid to paramilitary groups to protect workers. Activists, on the other hand, insist that a portion of the money paid by Chiquita was used to finance political assassinations.

==== Peru ====
Peruvian government death squads carried out massacres against radicals and civilians in their fight against Shining Path and Túpac Amaru Revolutionary Movement.

==== Uruguay ====
In Uruguay, Death Squads were far-right paramilitary groups that were active in the early 1970s and carried out extrajudicial killings and other criminal actions.

==== Venezuela ====
In its 2002 and 2003 world reports, Human Rights Watch reported the existence of death squads in several Venezuelan states, involving members of the local police, the DISIP and the National Guard. These groups were responsible for the extrajudicial killings of civilians and wanted or alleged criminals, including street criminals, looters and drug users.

In 2019, amid the Crisis in Bolivarian Venezuela, the government of Nicolás Maduro was accused by a UN human rights report of using death squads to conduct thousands of extrajudicial executions. The report relayed a multitude of eyewitness accounts, describing the government's Special Action Forces (FAES) frequently arriving at homes in unmarked vehicles, executing male suspects on the spot, then planting drugs or weapons on the corpse to make it appear the victim died resisting arrest. According to the report, the executions were part of a campaign aimed at "neutralizing, repressing and criminalizing political opponents and people critical of the government". The Maduro government condemned the report as "openly biased".

=== Asia ===
==== Afghanistan ====
Human Rights Watch asserted in a 2019 report that the Central Intelligence Agency was backing death squads in the War in Afghanistan. The report alleges that the CIA-supported Afghan Armed Forces committed "summary executions and other grave abuses without accountability" over the course of more than a dozen night raids that took place between 2017 and 2019. The death squads allegedly committed "extrajudicial killings of civilians, forced disappearances of detainees, and attacks on healthcare facilities that treat insurgents," according to Vice's reporting on the contents of the Human Rights Watch report. According to the same article, "The forces are recruited, equipped, trained, and deployed under the auspices of the CIA to target insurgents from the Taliban, Al Qaeda, and ISIS." The article also states these Afghan forces have the ability to call in United States Air Force airstrikes, which have resulted in the deaths of civilians, including children, and have occurred in civilian areas, including at weddings, parks, and schools.

==== Bangladesh ====
In contemporary times, the Bangladeshi "Rapid Action Battalion" has been criticized by rights groups for its use of extrajudicial killings. In addition, there have been many reports of torture in connection with the battalion's activities. Several battalion members have been accused of murder and obstruction of justice during the Narayanganj Seven murder. They've been known to kill civilian suspects for the explicit purpose of avoiding trials. They have also been accused of carrying out a campaign of forced disappearances.

==== Cambodia ====
The Khmer Rouge began employing death squads to purge Cambodia of Soviet-aligned communists after taking over the country in 1975. They rounded up their victims, questioned them and then took them out to killing fields.

==== India ====
The secret killings of Assam (1998–2001) consisted of the systemic murder of people affiliated with the United Liberation Front of Asom. These extrajudicial killings were conducted by the Government of Assam using SULFA members and the security forces in the name of counter-insurgency operations. The motive for the killings was a retaliation for UFLA's violence against the SULFA.

==== Indonesia ====
During the transition to the New Order in 1965–1966, with the backing of the United States government and its Western allies, the Indonesian National Armed Forces and right-wing paramilitary death squads massacred hundreds of thousands of leftists and those believed tied to the Communist Party of Indonesia (PKI) after a failed coup attempt which was blamed on the Communists. At least 400,000 to 500,000 people, perhaps as many as 3 million, were killed over a period of several months, with thousands more being interred in prisons and concentration camps under extremely inhumane conditions. The violence culminated in the fall of the "guided democracy" regime under President Sukarno and the commencement of Suharto's thirty-year authoritarian reign.

==== Iran ====
After the Islamic Revolution overthrew the Shah, Amnesty International continued to complain of human rights abuses in Iran. Suspected foes of the Ayatollah Khomeini, were imprisoned, tortured, tried by kangaroo courts, and executed. The most famous victim of the era's death squad violence remains Amir-Abbas Hoveida, a Prime Minister of Iran under the Shah. However, the same treatment was also meted out to senior officers in the Iranian military. Other cases exist of Iranian dissidents opposed to the Islamic Republic who have been tracked down and murdered abroad. One of the most notorious examples of this remains the 1992 Mykonos restaurant assassinations in Berlin, Germany.

The Iranian government's victims include civilians who have been killed by "death squads" that operate under the control of government agents but these killing operations have been denied by the Iranian government. This was particularly the case during the 1990s when more than 80 writers, translators, poets, political activists, and ordinary citizens who had been critical of the government in some way, disappeared or were found murdered. In 1983 the American Central Intelligence Agency (CIA) gave one of the leaders of Iran Khomeini information on Communist KGB agents in Iran. This information was almost certainly used. Later, The Iranian regime occasionally used death squads throughout the 1970s, 80s, and 90s. However, by the 2000s, it seems to have almost if not entirely ceased its operations. This partial Westernization of the country can be seen as paralleling similar events in Lebanon, the United Arab Emirates, and Northern Iraq beginning in the late 1990s.

==== Iraq ====
Iraq was formed by the British Empire from three provinces of the Ottoman Empire following the empire's breakup after World War I. Its population is overwhelmingly Muslim but is divided into Shiites and Sunnis, with a Kurdish minority in the north. The new state leadership in the capital of Baghdad was formerly composed of, for the most part, the old Sunni Arab elite.

After Saddam Hussein was overthrown by the US-led invasion of Iraq in 2003, the secular socialist Baathist leadership were replaced with a provisional and later constitutional government that included leadership roles for the Shia and Kurds. This paralleled the development of ethnic militias by the Shia, Sunni, and the Kurdish Peshmerga.

During the course of the Iraq War the country has increasingly become divided into three zones: a Kurdish ethnic zone to the north, a Sunni center and the Shia ethnic zone to the south.

While all three groups have operated death squads, in the national capital of Baghdad some members of the now Shia Iraqi Police and Iraqi Army formed unofficial, unsanctioned, but long tolerated death squads. They possibly have links to the Interior Ministry and are popularly known as the 'black crows'. These groups operated either by night or by day. They usually arrested people, then either tortured or killed them.

The victims of these attacks were predominantly young males who had probably been suspected of being members of the Sunni insurgency. Agitators such as Abdul Razaq al-Na'as, Dr. Abdullateef al-Mayah, and Dr. Wissam Al-Hashimi have also been killed. Women and children have also been arrested or killed. Some of these killings have also been simple robberies or other criminal activities.

A feature in a May 2005 issue of the magazine of The New York Times accused the U.S. military of modelling the "Wolf Brigade", the Iraqi interior ministry police commandos, on the death squads that were used in the 1980s to crush the Marxist insurgency in El Salvador.

In 2004, the US dispatched James Steele as an envoy and special training adviser to the Iraqi Special Police Commandos who were later accused of torture and death squad activities. Steele had served in El Salvador in the 1980s, where he helped train government units involved in human rights violations death squads in their war against the FMLNF.

==== Lebanon ====
Death squads were active during the Lebanese Civil War from 1975 to 1990. The number of people who disappeared during the conflict is put around 17,000. Groups like Hezbollah have used death squads and elite wings to terrorize opponents, the most known of them is Unit 121, that was led by Salim Ayyash.

==== Philippines ====
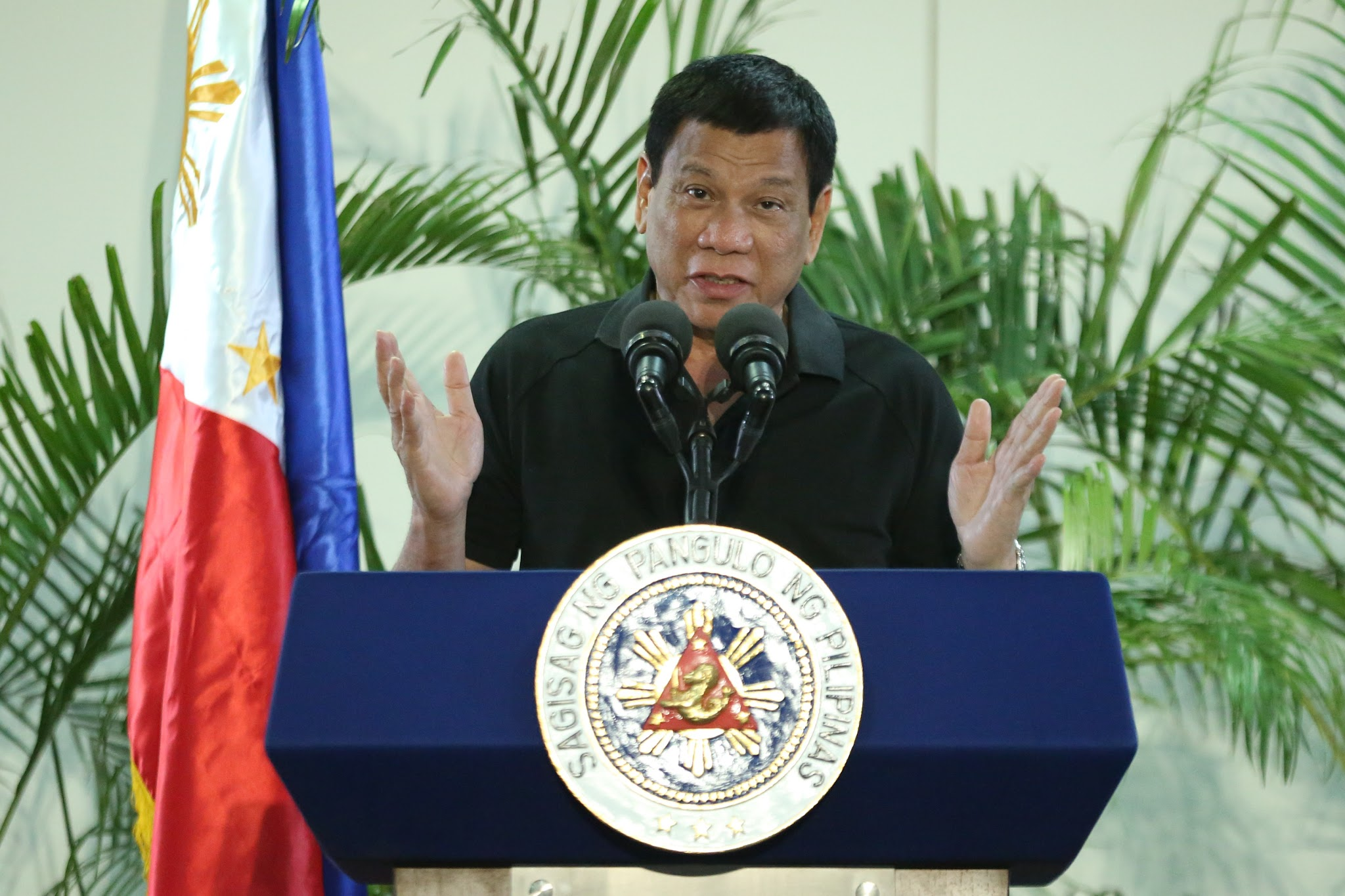
President Rodrigo Duterte

There are certain vigilante death squads that are active in the Philippines, especially in Davao City where local death squads roam around the city to hunt criminals.

After winning the Presidency in June 2016, Rodrigo Duterte had urged, "If you know of any addicts, go ahead and kill them yourself as getting their parents to do it would be too painful." By March 2017, the death toll for the Philippine drug war passed 8,000 people.

==== South Korea ====
News reports on the use of death squads in Korea originated around the middle of the 20th century such as the Jeju Massacre and Daejeon. There were also the multiple deaths that made the news in 1980 in Gwangju.

==== Syria ====
Throughout the Syrian Civil War, loosely-organized Assad loyalist Alawite mercenaries known collectively as Shabiha were armed and utilized by the Ba'athist government under Bashar al-Assad to serve as pro-government paramilitary enforcer units.

They were known to violently suppress anti-Assad protests, intimidate communities (especially the Sunni population), neutralize dissent, break oppositional strongholds and carry out brutal atrocities that included mass killings, gang rape, arson, lootings, humiliation and filming acts of torture which were used for propaganda and intimidation.

Although the Shabiha were not officially part of the Syrian Government, they were backed by the state, operating with the support of military intelligence and directly funded by the regime of Syrian President Bashar al-Assad.

In 2012, most Shabiha paramilitary groups became absorbed into the National Defense Forces (NDF) as well as other state-backed groups like the Military Security Shield Forces, Local Defense Forces, Fourth Armored Division militias, Tiger Forces and Air Force Intelligence Branch militias.

==== Thailand ====
During the Cold War, in the short period of democracy in Thailand after the 1973 Thai popular uprising (1973–1976), three right-wing paramilitary groups, Nawaphon, Red Gaurs, and Village Scouts were founded and supported by Internal Security Operations Command and Border Patrol Police to promote national unity, loyalty to Thai royal family, and anti-communism. They were also heavily funded and backed by the United States government and were under the patronage of the royal family themselves. Among their ranks were former soldiers, veterans of the Vietnam War, former mercenaries in Laos, and violent vocational students.

These groups were first employed to counter protests of the pro-democracy and left-wing students movement, attacking them with firearms and grenades. When the ideological conflict escalated, they started assassinating labor and peasants union officials and progressive politicians, the most famous was Dr. Boonsanong Punyodyana, the general secretary of the Socialist Party of Thailand. The conflict reached its peak with the Thammasat University massacre in 1976, which the Royal Thai Armed Forces and Royal Thai Police, supported by the three aforementioned paramilitary groups, stormed Thammasat University and shot mostly unarmed student protesters indiscriminately, resulting in at least 46 deaths. A military coup was staged later in the same day. During the military rule, the paramilitary groups' popularity diminished.

In contemporary Thailand, many extrajudicial killings occurred during the 2003 anti-drug effort of Thailand's prime minister Thaksin Shinawatra were attributed to government-sponsored death squads. Rumors still persist that there is collusion between the government, rogue military officers and radical right wing/anti-drugs death squads, with both Muslim and Buddhist sectarian death squads still operating in the South of the country.

==== Turkey ====
The Grey Wolves was established by Colonel Alparslan Türkeş in the 1960s, it was the main Turkish nationalist force during the political violence in 1976–80 in Turkey. During this period, the organization became a "death squad" engaged in "street killings and gunbattles". According to authorities, 220 of its members carried out 694 murders of left-wing and liberal activists and intellectuals. Attacks on university students were commonplace. They killed hundreds of Alevis in the Maraş massacre of 1978 and are alleged to have been behind the Taksim Square massacre of 1977. The masterminds behind the attempt on Pope John Paul II's life in 1981 by Grey Wolves member Mehmet Ali Ağca were not identified and the organization's role remains unclear. (Note: "Mohamed Ali Agca of Turkey, the man who shot at Pope John Paul II in Rome had no political motive. The investigating agency in Italy tried to establish his link with the Turkey based terrorist group, 'Grey Wolf,' however, could not get any evidence of his political connection.")

==== Ottoman Empire ====
During the Armenian genocide, the Special Organization functioned as a death squad.

=== Europe ===
==== Belarus ====
The Special Rapid Response Unit of the Internal Troops of Belarus has been referred to as a "hit squad" or "death squad" by various sources for its role in the repression of Belarusian opposition protests and allegations that it has participated in the enforced disappearances of opposition politicians.

==== Finland ====
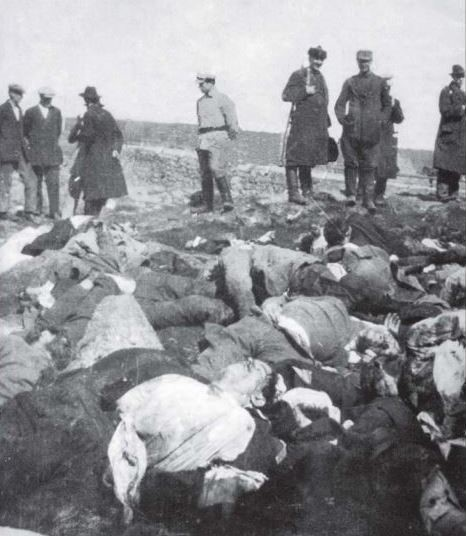
Hundreds of people belonging to ethnic minorities were executed in Vyborg for their supposed Bolshevik leanings.

10,000 leftists were executed by the victorious White Guard forces during the White Terror of the Finnish Civil War in 1918. General Mannerheim issued the Shoot on the Spot Declaration that gave commanders of units wide powers to carry out executions at their sole discretion.

==== Croatia ====
The Ustaše was a Croatian fascist and ultranationalist organization active, as one organization, between 1929 and 1945, formally known as the Ustaša – Croatian Revolutionary Movement (Croatian: Ustaša – Hrvatski revolucionarni pokret). Its members murdered hundreds of thousands of Serbs, Jews, and Roma as well as political dissidents in Yugoslavia during World War II.

==== France ====
In 1944, mainly as a result of the gradual liberation of France, armed groups claiming to be members of the Resistance executed around 10,000 people, in what historians describe as an extrajudicial purge, while archive documents speak of "repression at the Liberation".

The French Armed Forces used death squads during the Algerian War (1954–1962).

==== Germany ====
===== Weimar Republic =====
Death squads first appeared in Germany following the end of the First World War and the overthrow of the House of Hohenzollern. In order to prevent a coup d'etat by the Soviet-backed Communist Party of Germany, the Majority Social Democratic-dominated government of the Weimar Republic declared a state of emergency and ordered the recruitment of World War I veterans into militias called the Freikorps. Although officially answering to Defense Minister Gustav Noske, the Freikorps tended to be drunken, trigger happy, and loyal only to their own commanders. However, they were instrumental in the defeat of the 1919 Spartacist Uprising and the annexation of the short-lived Bavarian Soviet Republic. The most famous victims of the Freikorps were the Communist leaders Karl Liebknecht and Rosa Luxemburg, who were captured after the suppression of the Spartacist Uprising and shot without trial. After the Freikorps units turned against the Republic in the monarchist Kapp Putsch, many of the leaders were forced to flee abroad and the units were largely disbanded.

Some Freikorps veterans drifted into the ultra-nationalist Organisation Consul, which regarded the 1918 Armistice and the Versailles Treaty as treasonous and assassinated politicians who were associated with them. Among their victims were Matthias Erzberger and Walther Rathenau, both of whom were cabinet ministers in the Weimar regime.

In addition, the city of Munich remained a headquarters of Russian White émigré hit teams, which targeted those who were believed to have betrayed the Tsar. Their most infamous operation remains the 1922 attempt on the life of Russian Provisional Government statesman Pavel Miliukov in Berlin. When newspaper publisher Vladimir Dmitrievich Nabokov attempted to shield the intended victim, he was fatally shot by assassin Piotr Shabelsky-Bork.

During the same era, the Communist Party of Germany also operated its own assassination squads. Titled, the Rotfrontkämpferbund they carried out assassinations of carefully selected individuals from the Weimar Republic as well as assassinations of members of rival political parties. The most infamous operations of Weimar-era Communist death squads remain the 1931 slayings of Berlin Police captains Paul Anlauf and Franz Lenck. Those involved in the ambush either fled to the Soviet Union or were arrested and prosecuted. Among those to receive the death penalty was Max Matern, who was later glorified as a martyr by the East German State. The last surviving conspirator, former East German secret police head Erich Mielke, was belatedly tried and convicted for the murders in 1993. The evidence needed to successfully prosecute him had been found in his personal safe after German reunification.

===== Nazi Germany =====
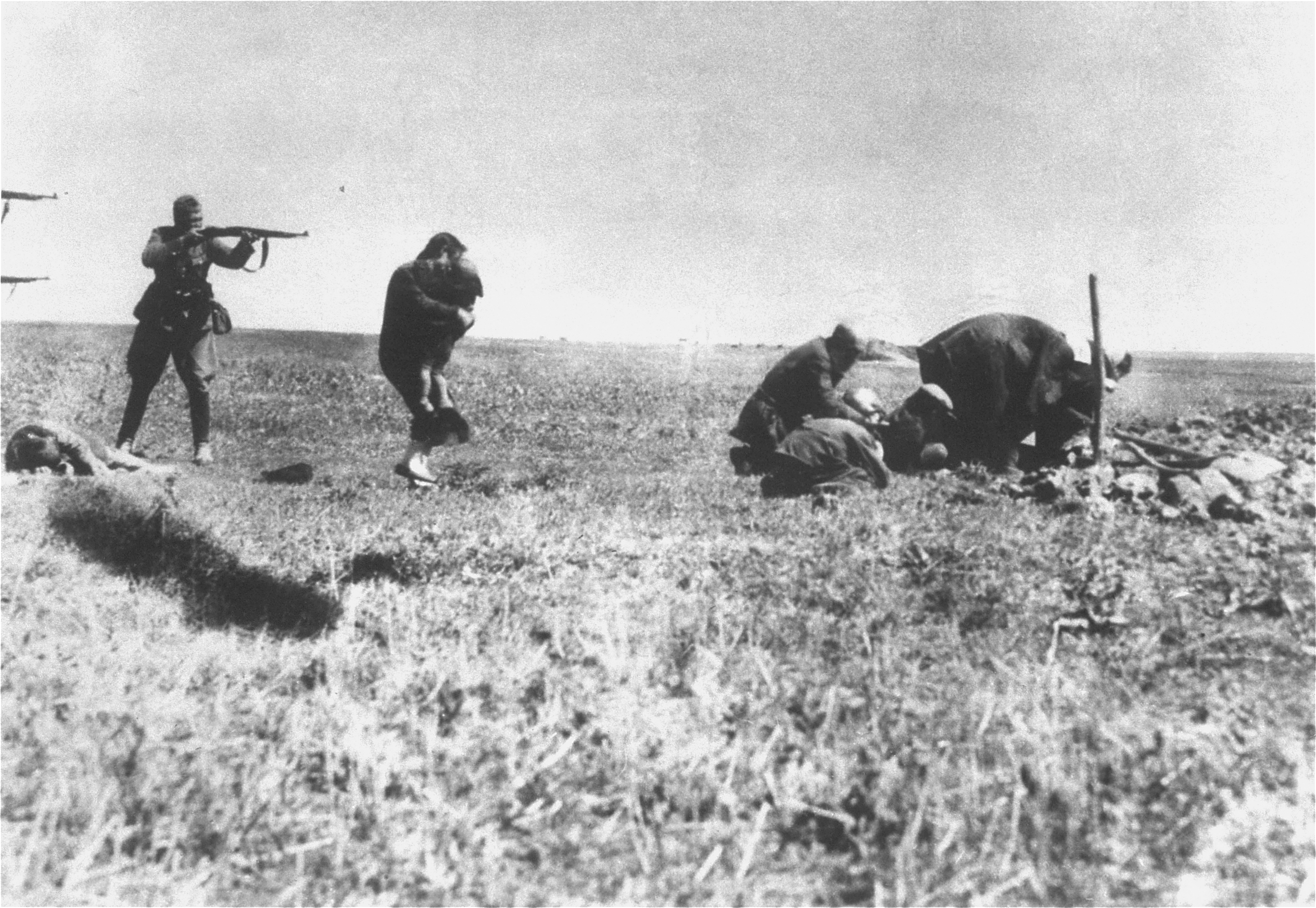
Einsatzgruppen murder Jews in Ivanhorod, Ukraine, 1942

Between 1933 and 1945, Germany was a one-party state ruled by the fascist Nazi Party and its leader, Adolf Hitler. During this period, the Germans made extensive use of death squads and targeted killings.

In 1934, Hitler ordered the extrajudicial killings of Ernst Röhm and all members of the Sturmabteilung who remained loyal to him. Simultaneously, Hitler also ordered a mass purge of the German Reichswehr, targeting officers who, like General Kurt von Schleicher, had opposed his drive for absolute power. These massacres have gone down in history as, "The Night of the Long Knives."

Following the invasion of the Soviet Union in 1941, the German Wehrmacht was followed by four travelling death squads called Einsatzgruppen to hunt down and murder Jews, Communists and other so-called undesirables in the occupied areas. This was the first of the massacres which comprised the Holocaust. Typically, the victims, who included women and children, were forcibly marched from their homes to open graves or ravines before being shot. Many others suffocated in specially designed poison trucks called gas vans. Between 1941 and 1944, the Einsatzgruppen murdered some 7,4 million Soviet civilians, 1.3 million Jews, as well as tens of thousands of suspected political dissidents, most of the Polish upper class and intelligentsia, POWs, and uncounted numbers of Romany. These tactics ended only with the defeat of Nazi Germany in 1945.

===== East Germany =====
Between the end of World War II and 1989, Germany was divided into the democratic and capitalist Federal Republic of Germany and the Communist German Democratic Republic, a one-party state under the Socialist Unity Party and its secret police, the Stasi. During these years, kangaroo courts and cavalier use of the death penalty were routinely used against suspected enemies of the State. In order to prevent East German citizens from defecting to the West, orders were issued to border guards to shoot suspected defectors on sight. During the 1980s, the Stasi carried out a mission to hunt down and assassinate West Germans who were suspected of smuggling East Germans.

On the orders of the Party leadership and Stasi chief Erich Mielke, the East German Government financed, armed, and trained, "urban guerrillas," from numerous countries. According to ex-Stasi Colonel Rainer Wiegand, ties to terrorist organizations were overseen by Markus Wolf and Department Three of the Stasi's foreign intelligence wing. Members of the West German Rote Armee Fraktion, the Chilean Manuel Rodríguez Patriotic Front, and the South African Umkhonto we Sizwe were brought to East Germany for training in the use of military hardware and, "the leadership role of the Party." Similar training was provided to Palestinian fighters from the Popular Front for the Liberation of Palestine.

Other Stasi agents worked as military advisers to African Marxist guerrillas and the governments they later formed. They included the Namibian SWAPO and the Angolan MPLA during the South African Border War, the FRELIMO during the Mozambican War of Independence and civil war, and Robert Mugabe's ZANLA during the Rhodesian Bush War.

Colonel Wiegand revealed that Mielke and Wolf provided bodyguards from the Stasi's counter-terrorism division for Senior PLO terrorist Carlos the Jackal and Black September leader Abu Daoud during their visits to the GDR. Col. Wiegand had been sickened by the 1972 Munich massacre and was horrified that the GDR would treat the man who ordered it as an honored guest. When he protested, Wiegand was told that Abu Daoud was, "a friend of our country, a high-ranking political functionary," and that there was no proof that he was a terrorist.

During the 1980s, Wiegand secretly recruited a Libyan diplomat into spying on his colleagues. Wiegand's informant told him that the La Belle bombing and other terrorist attacks against western citizens were being planned at the Libyan Embassy in East Berlin. When Wiegand showed him a detailed report, Mielke informed the SED's Politburo, which ordered the Colonel to continue surveillance but not interfere with the plans of the Libyans.

Shortly before German Reunification, West Germany's Federal Constitutional Court indicted former Stasi chief Erich Mielke for collusion with two Red Army Faction terrorist attacks against U.S. military personnel. The first was the car bomb attack at Ramstein Air Base on 31 August 1981. The second was the attempted murder of United States Army General Frederick Kroesen at Heidelberg on 15 September 1981. The latter attack, which was carried out by RAF members Brigitte Mohnhaupt and Christian Klar, involved firing an RPG-7 anti-tank rocket into the General's armored Mercedes. Due to reasons of senile dementia, Mielke was never placed on trial for either attack.

===== Federal Republic of Germany =====
Following German reunification, death squads linked to foreign intelligence services have continued to operate in Germany. The most infamous example of this remains the 1992 Mykonos restaurant assassinations, in which a group of anti-Islamist Iranians were fatally machine-gunned in a Greek restaurant in Berlin. A German court ultimately convicted the assassins and exposed the involvement of intelligence services of the Islamic Republic of Iran. The murder and subsequent trial has been publicized in the nonfiction bestseller The Assassins of the Turquois Palace by Roya Hakakian.

==== Hungary ====
For most of World War II, Hungary was a military ally of Nazi Germany. After being threatened in late June or early July 1944 by Franklin D. Roosevelt, Winston Churchill and others with post-war retribution on 7 July 1944 Hungary's Regent Admiral Miklós Horthy ordered stopping the deportation of Hungarian Jews to Auschwitz, which until then took daily about 12,000 Jews to their death.

Then, in October 1944, Horthy announced a cease-fire with the Allied powers and ordered the Royal Hungarian Army to lay down their arms. In response, Nazi Germany launched Operation Panzerfaust, a covert operation which forced Horthy to abdicate in favour of the Fascist and militantly racist Arrow Cross Party, which was led by Ferenc Szálasi. This was followed by an Arrow Cross coup in Budapest on the same day. Szálasi was declared "Leader of the Nation" and prime minister of a "Government of National Unity".

Arrow Cross rule, despite lasting only three months, was brutal. Death squads killed as many as 38,000 Hungarians. Arrow Cross officers helped Adolf Eichmann re-activate the deportation proceedings from which the Jews of Budapest had previously been spared, sending some 80,000 Jews out of the city on slave labor details and many more straight to death camps. Many Jewish males of conscription age were already serving as slave labor for the Hungarian Army's Forced Labor Battalions. Most of them died, including many who were murdered outright after the end of the fighting as they were returning home. Quickly formed battalions raided the Yellow Star Houses and combed the streets, hunting down Jews claimed to be partisans and saboteurs since Jews attacked Arrow Cross squads at least six to eight times with gunfire. These approximately 200 Jews were taken to the bridges crossing the Danube, where they were shot and their bodies borne away by the waters of the river because many were attached to weights while they were handcuffed to each other in pairs.

Red Army troops on their way to Nazi Germany reached the outskirts of Budapest in December 1944, and the intense Battle of Budapest began. Days before he fled the city, Arrow Cross Interior Minister Gábor Vajna commanded that streets and squares named after Jews be renamed.

As control of the city's institutions began to decay, the Arrow Cross trained their guns on the most helpless possible targets: patients in the beds of the city's two Jewish hospitals on Maros Street and Bethlen Square, and residents in the Jewish poorhouse on Alma Road. Arrow Cross members continually sought to raid the ghettos and Jewish concentration buildings; the majority of Budapest's Jews were saved only by a handful of Jewish leaders and foreign diplomats, most famously the Swedish Raoul Wallenberg, the Papal Nuncio Monsignor Angelo Rotta, Swiss Consul Carl Lutz and Francoist Spain's consul general, Giorgio Perlasca. Szálasi knew that the documents used by these diplomats to save Jews were invalid according to international law, but ordered that they be respected.

The Arrow Cross government effectively fell at the end of January 1945, when the Soviet Army took Pest and their enemies forces retreated across the Danube to Buda. Szálasi had escaped from Budapest on 11 December 1944, taking with him the Hungarian royal crown, while Arrow Cross members and German forces continued to fight a rear-guard action in the far west of Hungary until the end of the war in April 1945.

After the war, many of the Arrow Cross leaders were captured and tried for war crimes. Many were executed, including Ferenc Szálasi. Fr. András Kun, a Roman Catholic priest who commanded an Arrow Cross death squad while dressed in his cassock, was also convicted and hanged after the war. Fr. Kun's cassock remains on permanent display at the House of Terror in Budapest.

==== Ireland ====
===== Irish War of Independence =====
As British authority in Ireland began to disintegrate, Prime Minister David Lloyd George declared a state of emergency. In order to defeat the IRA, Winston Churchill, the Secretary of State for War, suggested the recruitment of First World War veterans into a paramilitary law enforcement group which would be integrated into the RIC. Lloyd George agreed to the proposal, and advertisements were filed in British newspapers. Groups of formerly enlisted men were formed into the Black and Tans, so called because of the mixture of surplus military and RIC uniforms they were given. Veterans who had held officers rank were formed into the Auxiliary Division of the RIC, the members of which were higher paid and received better supplies. Members of both units, however, were despised by the Irish public, against whom the "Tans" and "Auxies" routinely retaliated against for IRA raids and assassinations.

Members of the Government of the United Kingdom, the British administration in Ireland, and senior officers in the RIC tacitly supported reprisals as a way of scaring the Irish into rejecting the IRA. In December 1920, the British government officially approved certain reprisals against property. There were an estimated 150 official reprisals over the next six months. This further eroded support for British rule among the Irish populace.

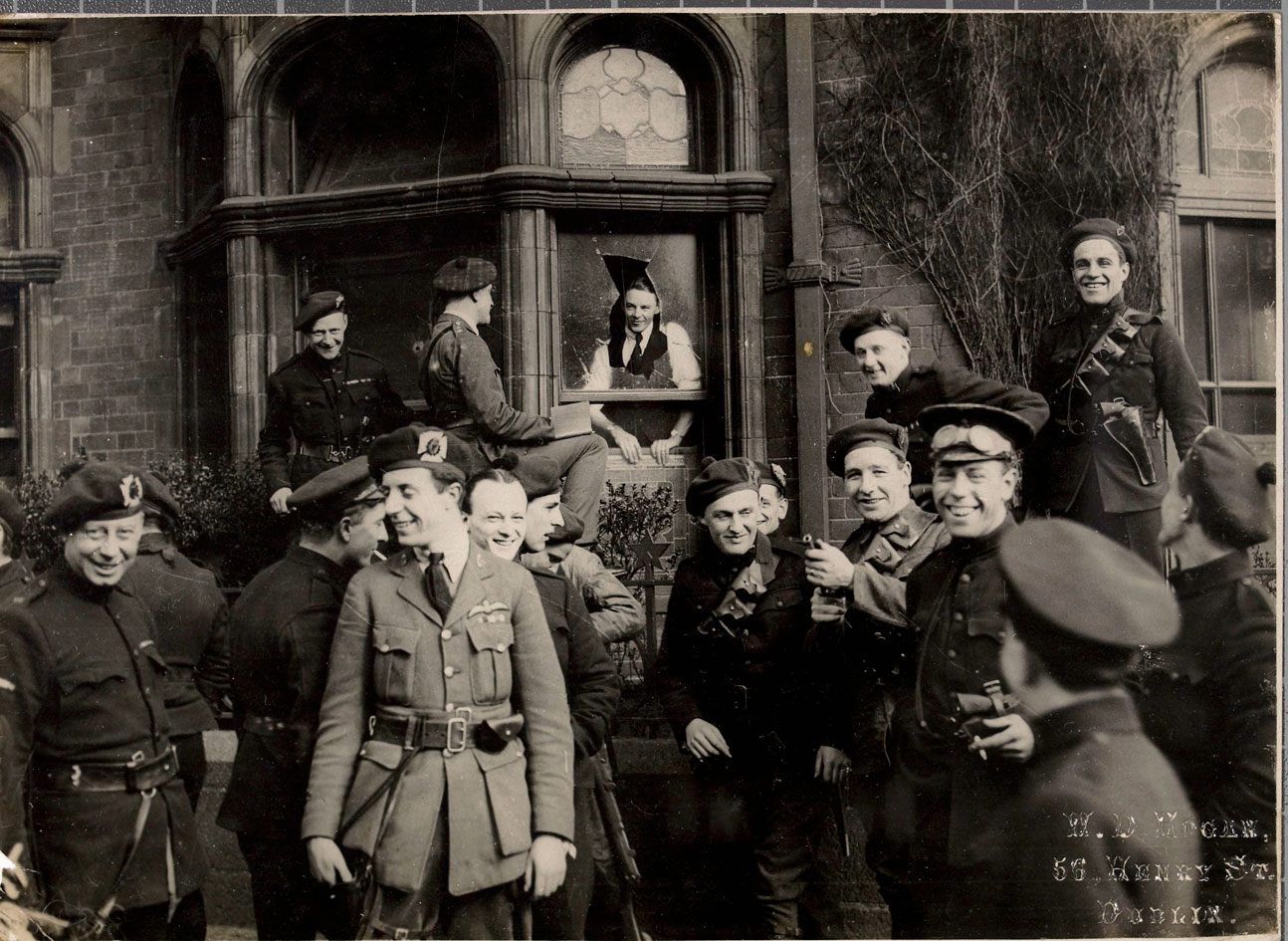
A group of Black and Tans in Dublin, April 1921.

On 20 March 1920, Tomás Mac Curtain, the nationalist Lord Mayor of Cork, was shot dead in front of his wife and son by a group of RIC officers with blackened faces.

Enraged, Collins ordered the Twelve Apostles to hunt down and assassinate every one of the RIC officers involved in Mac Curtain's murder. On 22 August 1920, RIC District Inspector Oswald Swanzy, who had ordered the assassination, was shot dead with Mac Curtain's revolver while leaving a Protestant church service in Lisburn, County Antrim. This sparked a "pogrom" against the Catholic residents of the town.

On Bloody Sunday, Collins' men set out to assassinate members of a British intelligence group known as the Cairo Gang, killing or fatally wounding fifteen men, some of whom were unconnected to the Gang. In one incident, the IRA group was heard to scream, "May the Lord have mercy on your souls", before opening fire.

Collins later said of the incident:

My one intention was the destruction of the undesirables who continued to make miserable the lives of ordinary decent citizens. I have proof enough to assure myself of the atrocities which this gang of spies and informers have committed. If I had a second motive it was no more than a feeling such as I would have for a dangerous reptile. By their destruction the very air is made sweeter. For myself, my conscience is clear. There is no crime in detecting in wartime the spy and the informer. They have destroyed without trial. I have paid them back in their own coin.

That afternoon, the Auxiliary Division opened fire into the crowd during a Gaelic football match at Croke Park in retaliation, killing 14 and wounding 68 players and spectators.

The hostilities ended in 1921 with the signing of the Anglo-Irish Treaty, which guaranteed the independence of the Irish Free State.

==== Poland ====
According to Polish journalist Leszek Szymowski, at least one death squad operated in Poland at the end of the Cold War and after the regime change of 1989, and was responsible for the assassination of the former prime minister Piotr Jaroszewicz and his spouse Alicja Solska as well as several Polish Catholic priests between January and July 1989 to include Stefan Niedzielak, Stanisław Suchowolec and Sylwester Zych.

===== The Serial Suicider =====
The term "serial suicider" was coined in Polish culture to denote the cases of mysterious deaths appearing as suicidal, which were usually attributed to the authorities.

==== Russia ====
===== Russian Empire =====
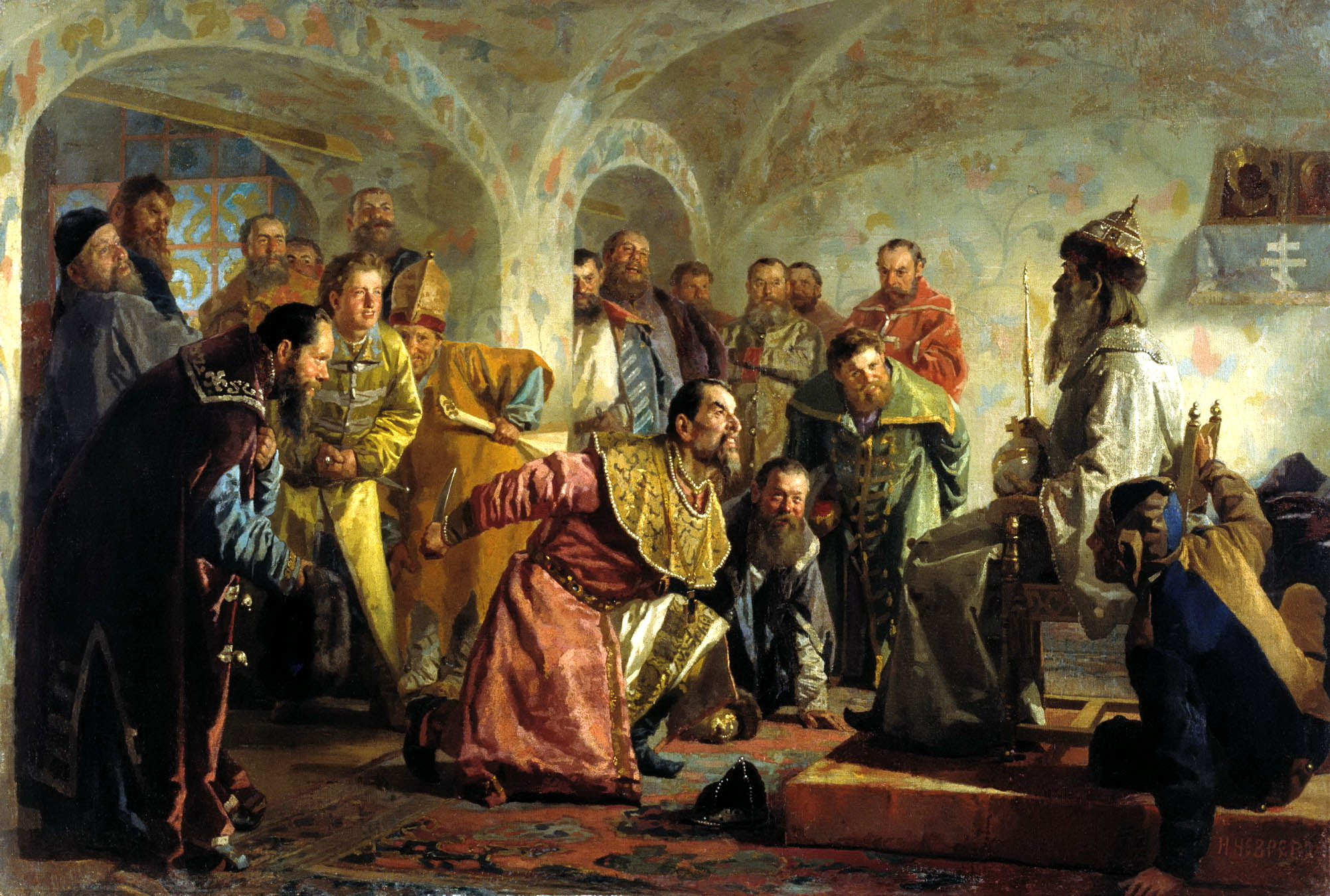
Oprichniki, painting by Nikolai Nevrev

The first organized use of death squad violence in Russia dates from the 16th century reign of Ivan the Terrible, the first Russian monarch to claim the title of Tsar. Named the Oprichniki, they wore quivers which contained brooms, symbolizing their mission to ferret the enemies of the Tsar. They dressed in black garb, which was similar to a Russian Orthodox monastic habit, and bore the insignia of a severed dog's head (to sniff out treason and the enemies of the Tsar) and a broom (to sweep them away). The dog's head was also symbolic of their "nipping at the heels of the Tsar's enemies." They were sometimes called the "Tsar's Dogs" on account of their loyalty to him. They also rode black horses in order to inspire a greater level of terror.

Their oath of allegiance was: I swear to be true to the Lord, Grand Prince, and his realm, to the young Grand Princes, and to the Grand Princess, and not to maintain silence about any evil that I may know or have heard or may hear which is being contemplated against the Tsar, his realms, the young princes or the Tsaritsa. I swear also not to eat or drink with the zemshchina, and not to have anything in common with them. On this I kiss the cross.

Led by Malyuta Skuratov, the Oprichniki routinely tortured and executed whomever the Tsar suspected of treason, including boyars, merchants, clergymen, commoners, and even entire cities. The memoirs of Heinrich von Staden provide a detailed description of both the Tsar's motivations and the inner workings of the Oprichniki.

The most famous victims of the Oprichniki remains Kyr Philip Kolychev, the Metropolitan bishop of Moscow. The Metropolitan gave a sermon in the Tsar's presence in which he rebuked Ivan for terrorizing and murdering large numbers of innocent people and their families. Enraged, Tsar Ivan convened a Church council which declared Metropolitan Philip defrocked and imprisoned in a monastery for delinquent clergy. Years later, Tsar Ivan sent an emissary demanding Metropolitan Philip's blessing on his plans for the Novgorod massacre. Metropolitan Philip said, "Only the good are blessed."

Enraged, Tsar Ivan sent Skuratov to personally strangle the Metropolitan in his monastic cell. Metropolitan Philip was subsequently glorified as a Saint by the Russian Orthodox Church.

In later centuries, Russian Tsars would declare a state of emergency and use death squad tactics in order to suppress domestic uprisings like Pugachev's Rebellion and the Russian Revolution of 1905. During the latter, Tsar Nicholas II of Russia ordered the Imperial Russian Army to ally itself with the Black Hundreds, an ultra-nationalist paramilitary group. Those captured in arms against the Tsar's forces were tried by military tribunals before being hanged or shot. According to Simon Sebag Montefiore, being caught wearing similar clothing to Anti-Tsarist militias was often enough for court martial followed by execution. These tactics were continued by the anti-communist White Movement during the Russian Civil War (1917-1920).

Opponents of the House of Romanov also carried out targeted killings of those deemed as enemies of Socialism, which was referred to as individual terror. Among them were the People's Will, the Bolshevik Battle Squad, and the Combat Brigade of the Socialist Revolutionary Party. Among the victims of Marxist death squads were Tsar Alexander II of Russia, the Grand Duke Sergei Alexandrovich of Russia, and the Georgian language poet and publisher Ilia Chavchavadze. These tactics were drastically accelerated following the October Revolution.

===== Soviet Union =====
Following the Bolshevik Revolution, the former Russian Empire spent 74 years as the Soviet Union, a one-party state ruled by the Communist Party of the Soviet Union. Especially between 1917 and 1953, the CPSU routinely ordered the abduction, torture, and execution of massive numbers of real and suspected anti-communists. Those with upper class origins were routinely targeted in this way during the early years of the Soviet Union.

Most of the repression was committed by the regular forces of the state, like the army and the police, but there were also many cases of clandestine and covert operations.

During the interwar period, the NKVD routinely targeted anti-Stalinists in the West for abduction or murder. Among them were the CPSU's former Commissar of War, Leon Trotsky, who was assassinated in Mexico City on 21 August 1940 by NKVD officer Ramon Mercador. Furthermore, former White Army Generals Alexander Kutepov and Evgeny Miller were abducted in Paris by the NKVD. Kutepov is alleged to have had a heart attack before he could be smuggled back to Moscow and shot. General Miller was not so fortunate and died in Moscow's Lubianka Prison. Yevhen Konovalets, the founder of the Organization of Ukrainian Nationalists, was blown to bits by NKVD officer Pavel Sudoplatov in Rotterdam on 23 May 1938.

In the post-war period, the Russian Orthodox Church collaborated with the Soviet State in a campaign to eliminate Eastern Rite Catholicism in the newly annexed regions of the Ukrainian Soviet Socialist Republic. Priests and laity who refused to convert to Orthodoxy were either assassinated or deported to the GULAGs in Karaganda. On 27 October 1947, the NKVD staged a car accident in order to assassinate the Ukrainian Greek-Catholic Bishop Theodore Romzha of Mukachevo. When the "accident" failed to kill the Bishop, the NKVD poisoned him in his hospital bed on 1 November 1947.

Even in the post-Stalin era, the Soviet secret police continued to assassinate anti-communists in the West. Two of the most notable victims were Lev Rebet and Stepan Bandera, Ukrainian nationalists who were assassinated by the KGB in Munich, West Germany. Both deaths were believed to be accidental until 1961, when their murderer, Bohdan Stashynsky, defected to the West with his wife and voluntarily surrendered to West German authorities.

===== Russian Federation =====
The Russian Armed Forces has been accused of using death squads against Chechen insurgents. After defecting to the United States in October 2000, Sergei Tretyakov, an SVR agent, accused the Government of the Russian Federation of following Soviet-era practices by routinely assassinating its critics abroad.

==== Spain ====
In the Spanish Civil War, which broke out in 1936 following years of unrest, death squads used by both the Nationalists and Republicans. The former were supported by Italy and Nazi Germany, and the latter by Mexico and the Soviet Union. Prominent victims of the era's death squad violence include the poet Federico García Lorca, José Robles, and journalist Ramiro Ledesma Ramos.

The ranks of the Republican assassination squads included Erich Mielke, the future head of the East German Ministry of State Security. Walter Janka, a veteran of the Republican forces who remembers him described Mielke's career as follows:

While I was fighting at the front, shooting at the Fascists, Mielke served in the rear, shooting Trotskyites and Anarchists.

In the modern era, death squads, including the Batallón Vasco Español, Triple A, Grupos Antiterroristas de Liberación (GAL) were illegally set up by officials within the Spanish government to fight ETA. They were active from 1975 until 1987, operating under Spanish Socialist Workers' Party cabinets from 1982.

==== United Kingdom ====
During the Troubles, an ethno-nationalist conflict in Northern Ireland which lasted from the 1960s until the 1990s, numerous accusations of collusion between the British state and Loyalist paramilitaries were made. The Military Reaction Force (MRF), a disbanded British Intelligence Corps unit which operated undercover in Northern Ireland during the Troubles, was described by a former member as a "legalised death squad". In an interview, another former MRF member stated that "If you had a player who was a well-known shooter who carried out quite a lot of assassinations... then he had to be taken out. [They were] killers themselves, and they had no mercy for anybody."

The Provisional Irish Republican Army (IRA), an Irish republican paramilitary organisation, was also operating death squads in Northern Ireland during the Troubles. Historians have described the IRA's Internal Security Unit as a death squad, which targeted suspected informers by conducting investigations, interrogating suspects and executing those the IRA thought were guilty of passing on information to British security forces. Prior to any execution carried out by the Internal Security Unit, an ad hoc court-martial of the suspected informer would take place, and any death sentence passed would need to be ratified by the IRA Army Council in advance. IRA members carried out extrajudicial killings and massacres of protestant civilians, most notably the Kingsmill massacre, in which 136 rounds were spent against eleven unarmed and nonresisting protestant men on their way home from work.

==== Yugoslavia ====
The Srebrenica Massacre, also known as the Srebrenica Genocide, was the July 1995 killing of an estimated 8,000 Bosniak men and boys, as well as the ethnic cleansing of 1,000–2,000 refugees in the area of Srebrenica in Bosnia and Herzegovina, by units of the Army of Republika Srpska (VRS) under the command of General Ratko Mladić during the Bosnian War. In addition to the VRS, a paramilitary unit from Serbia known as the Scorpions participated in the massacre.

In Potočari, some of the executions were carried out at night under arc lights, and industrial bulldozers then pushed the bodies into mass graves. According to evidence collected from Bosniaks by French policeman Jean-René Ruez, some were buried alive; he also heard testimony describing Serb forces killing and torturing refugees at will, streets littered with corpses, people committing suicide to avoid having their noses, lips and ears chopped off, and adults being forced to watch the soldiers kill their children.

In 2004, in a unanimous ruling on the "Prosecutor v. Krstić" case, the Appeals Chamber of the International Criminal Tribunal for the former Yugoslavia (ICTY) located in The Hague ruled that the Srebrenica massacre was genocide.

== Human rights groups ==
Many human rights organisations like Amnesty International campaign against extrajudicial punishment and extrajudicial killings.

== See also ==
- Arbitrary arrest and detention
- Manhunt (military)
- Midnight Man (TV serial)
- Outlaw
- Salvador Option
- Social cleansing
- Assassination
- Vigilante

=== Agencies ===
- DIM of Venezuela
- DINA of Chile
- Einsatzgruppen of Nazi Germany
- PIDE of Portugal
- Securitate of the Socialist Republic of Romania
- SIDE of Argentina
- Stasi of East Germany
- National Information Service of Brazil
- SULFA of India
- ZOMO of the Polish People's Republic

== Sources ==
- Rhodes, Richard (2002). Masters of Death: The SS-Einsatzgruppen and the Invention of the Holocaust. New York: Vintage Books. ISBN 978-0-375-70822-0.
- Tomasevich, Jozo (2001). War and Revolution in Yugoslavia, 1941–1945: Occupation and Collaboration. Stanford Univ: Stanford University Press. ISBN 978-0-8047-3615-2.
