= José Bueso Rosa =

Honduran military officer

- Military career
- Rank: General
- Awards: Legion of Merit

José Bueso Rosa is a former Honduran military officer, and was chief-of-staff of the Honduran Army until March 1984. In July 1986 he was sentenced to five years in prison by a US court for his part in planning an assassination attempt on Honduran President Roberto Suazo Córdova.

== Career ==
Bueso Rosa was chief-of-staff of the Honduran Army until March 1984, when he was ousted together with Gustavo Álvarez Martínez, the Commander-in-Chief of the Honduran military. Bueso Rosa had played a significant role in the US support to the Nicaraguan Contras, and was awarded the Legion of Merit for his efforts. After being ousted, Bueso Rosa was sent to Chile as a military attache.

Bueso Rosa was detained in Chile for eight months while the US sought his extradition in connection with a 1984 plot to assassinate Honduran President Roberto Suazo Córdova; he surrendered voluntarily to the US in late 1985. In June 1986 he pleaded guilty in a US court to "two counts of traveling in furtherance of a conspiracy to plan an assassination", and was sentenced to five years. The plot was due to be financed by the sale of cocaine in the US, of an amount variously reported as worth $10 million and $40 million.

In 1987, United States National Security Council documents were released indicating that Oliver North urged officials with the Department of State and Department of Justice to seek leniency for Bueso Rosa. Francis J. McNeil said "Justice and State turned off an ill-advised effort by some U.S. military officials to assert a United States Government interest in going light on General Bueso".

== See also ==
- CIA activities in Honduras
- History of Honduras (1982–present)
