= CIA activities in Honduras =

CIA activities in Honduras have been ongoing since the 1980s. More has become known to the public with the release of declassified documents.

== 1984 ==
Declassified documents from the CIA Inspector General begin with a heavily redacted 21 July 1984 cable to the National Security Council, stating that Gen. Gustavo Álvarez Martínez, head of the Honduras military, ordered the establishment of the 316th Military Intelligence Battalion (316 MI Bn).

This group was just one that US-based groups gave training to during the Cold War. The 316th Battalion was trained by the CIA, which in the Report of Investigation (96-0125-IG) declassifies the actions of the CIA in Honduras. This report details that the 316th Military Intelligence Battalion was credited with Kidnappings, Interrogation techniques, and being considered a "Death Squad". In the report, it explains how CIA Operatives were present and were aware of the executions and killings and did not stop them. The declassified interrogation manual known as “KUBARK” was a manual used by the CIA during Vietnam. Still, many of the things in the manual were seen to be far too similar to the ways that the 316th Battalion committed interrogations.

A former Delta Force Operative, CSM Eric L. Haney, has discussed how, during a joint operation with Honduran soldiers, he shot and killed a Former US citizen, David Arturo Báez, that he was unsure if he had defected or was a CIA operative.

== 1987 ==
Florencio Caballero was a former Honduran Army sergeant and interrogator until 1984. He stated that he had been trained by the Central Intelligence Agency, which the New York Times confirmed with US and Honduran officials. Much of his account was confirmed by three American and two Honduran officials and may be the fullest given of how army and police units were authorized to organize death squads that seized, interrogated and killed suspected leftists. He said that while Argentine and Chilean trainers taught the Honduran Army kidnapping and elimination techniques, the CIA explicitly forbade the use of physical torture or assassination. Although it forbade torture and assassination on paper, the CIA knew it was happening in Honduras. Indeed, the CIA helped train hundreds of Latin American dictatorships' police officers via both its infamous training manuals and the School of the Americas, now renamed the Western Hemisphere Institute for Security Cooperation (WHINSEC).

Caballero described the CIA role as ambiguous. Caballero said his superior officers ordered him and other members of army intelligence units to conceal their participation in death squads from CIA advisers. He added that he was sent to Houston for six months in 1979 to be trained by CIA instructors in interrogation techniques.

"They prepared me in interrogation to end the use of physical torture in Honduras - they taught psychological methods," Mr. Caballero said of his American training. "So when we had someone important, we hid him from the Americans, interrogated him ourselves and then gave him to a death squad to kill."

The C.I.A. had access to secret army jails and to written reports summarizing the interrogation of suspected leftists, according to Mr. Caballero and two American officials. The Americans also said the C.I.A. knew the Honduran Army was killing prisoners. The American officials said that at one point in 1983 the C.I.A. demanded the killings stop. In 1984, a C.I.A. agent was recalled from Honduras after a prisoner's relative identified him as having visited a secret jail, two American and one Honduran official said. According to Mr. Caballero, the agent was a regular contact between the interrogators and the C.I.A. Thus it seems likely that the C.I.A. was aware that killings were continuing.

== 1995 ==
In 1995, "The special prosecutor for human rights brought charges in July against eight retired and two active-duty members of the armed forces for their role in the kidnapping, torture, and attempted murder in 1982 of six student activists.... They survived their captivity in a clandestine prison because two of those abducted were the daughters of a government official....With the exception of one suspect, those under investigation were connected with Battalion 3-16, a secret Honduran military unit whose members were instructed by and worked with CIA officials...Although Human Rights Watch/Americas has pressed for several years for an accounting of U.S. involvement, the Clinton administration did not take steps to begin to examine the complicity of the United States in Honduran abuses until 1995. In mid-June, CIA Director John Deutch began an internal review of the agency's relationship with the Honduran military during the 1980s. Deutch stated that the investigation, which he characterized as an "independent review," would yield "new information" and "lessons about how not to do things while I'm director and in the future."

Deutch's announcement came after The Baltimore Sun published a four-part series in June on U.S. support given to the 316 MI Bn. Sun staff correspondents Gary Cohn and Ginger Thompson obtained formerly classified documents and interviewed three former 316 Bn members to document the breadth and depth of the battalion's close relationship to the CIA. The Sun series followed revelations in March that linked the CIA to serious human rights violations in Guatemala."

He was removed from his post at the end of March 1984. According to the cable, a Honduran human rights group claimed the battalion was responsible for almost all disappearances. At first, the new military leadership was going to dissolve the battalion, but later decided to replace senior officers and keep it intact.

The CIA Inspector General investigator asked questions including whether any CIA employee was present during torture or hostile interrogation, and what was known about some disappearances and killings. It was also questioned if an employee lied to the House Intelligence Committee.

While the findings were heavily redacted, apparently one employee knew that torture had gone on, but not who was present. An individual was later identified, who denied participation. The Inspector General concluded there was no CIA participation in torture.

The IG did verify that a Honduran hostage rescue force had captured and executed one individual who had been freed under an amnesty; it was unclear from the report if he had rejoined an insurgency. Another case concerned Father James Carney, a priest who had renounced his U.S. citizenship, and died under questionable circumstances while being pursued by the HRF. He had been reported to be "cadaverous" and may have died of starvation, or may have been killed by the HRF. The IG concluded no US personnel had been involved with this HRF operation.

Further congressional inquiries generated more responses. It became clear that the HRF definitely executed some guerrillas, including the aide to the priest. The details were redacted, but there was some, but not conclusive, evidence that Father Carney had starved. The IG concluded the cause of his death is unknown.

== 1997-1998 ==
The U.S's ambiguity regarding the investigative process would continue to persist for several more years. During 1997 and 1998, at the request of the Honduran government, the U.S. declassified thousands of pages of official documents detailing alleged human rights violations that occurred in Honduras during the 1980s. These documents included records from the State Department, the Defense Department, and the CIA, and they were handed over to the National Commissioner for Human Rights in Honduras, Doctor Leo Valladares. Valladares's work relied heavily on external documentation due to the destruction of Honduran military files.

On May 11, 1998, Doctor Valadares gave testimony before the House Committee on Government Reform and Oversight and the Committee on Government Management, Information, and Technology. During his testimony, he thanked the Clinton administration for their willingness to respond to his declassification request, but expressed frustration over the slow pace of the response, stating “The CIA, for example, has yet to release either records on the notorious military intelligence Battalion 3-16 or the 1997 CIA Inspector Generals' report on the agency's relationship to the Honduran military. Despite inexplicable delays, I continue to hope that the release of these documents will occur in the near future.” Doctor Valladares also emphasized that the human rights content of the information available to him had been scant and inadequate. Many documents, particularly those provided by CIA and Defense department had been heavily redacted. These frustrations weren't entirely surprising, as the CIA was known for censoring accounts of its own history.

Amid ongoing efforts to address complex legal issues, a notable case emerged. In early 1998, a Honduran court determined that Lieutenant Colonel Juan Blas Salazar Mesa, despite being implicated in the abduction, mistreatment, and killing of students in 1982, was eligible for amnesty under legislation passed in prior years. By the end of that year, the Supreme Court upheld the lower court's decision to extend amnesty to Salazar.
