= The Ambassador (2005 film) =

- Written by: Erling Borgen
- Directed by: Erling Borgen
- Starring: John Negroponte; Rigoberta Menchú; Gustavo Álvarez Martínez; Medardo Gómez
- Music by: Ragnar Bjerkreim
- Country of origin: Norway
- Original languages: Norwegian; Spanish; English

Production
- Producer: Erling Borgen
- Cinematography: Alejandro Reynoso; Line Bie; Dave Simmons; Randall Love
- Editor: Line Bie
- Running time: 56 minutes

Original release
- Release: 25 January 2005

The Ambassador (Norwegian: Ambassadøren) is a 2005 Norwegian television documentary film directed by Erling Borgen. It is a Norwegian production, produced by Erling Borgen for INSIGHT TV.

== Synopsis ==
The film examines the career of John Negroponte, focusing primarily on his time as U.S. Ambassador to Honduras in the early 1980s. It brings to light the militaristic aspects of his service in the region in relation to the Reagan Doctrine. Interviews with numerous Central American human rights activists point to Negroponte's alleged complicity in war crimes not only in his nation of diplomatic assignment, but also in neighboring El Salvador as a part of the Salvadoran Civil War and in Nicaragua as an aid to the Contras. The documentary covers forced disappearance as part of this involvement including the disappearance of 179 Hondurans and specific examples such as the case of Father James Carney, whose brother is interviewed. The film also contains interviews with former U.S. Ambassador to Honduras Jack R. Binns, Negroponte's predecessor; indigenous Guatemalan activist Rigoberta Menchú, and Salvadoran bishop Medardo Gómez.
