= Policarpo Paz García =

President of Honduras from 1978 to 1982

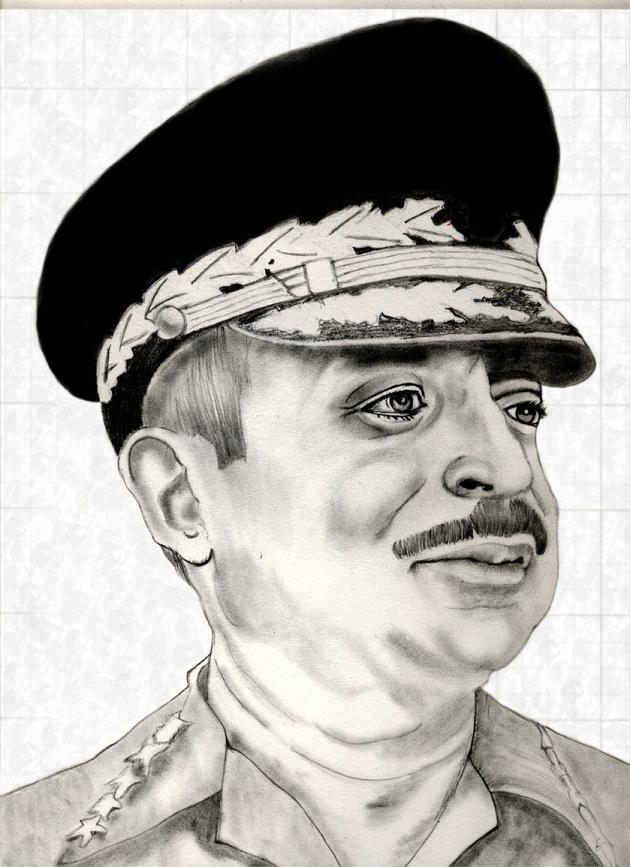

28th President of Honduras
- In office 7 August 1978 – 27 January 1982
- Preceded by: Juan Alberto Melgar Castro
- Succeeded by: Roberto Suazo Córdova

Chief of the Military of Honduras
- In office 7 August 1978 – 27 January 1980
- Preceded by: Juan Alberto Melgar Castro
- Succeeded by: Gustavo Álvarez Martínez

Personal details
- Born: Policarpo Juan Paz García; 7 December 1932 Goascorán, Honduras
- Died: 16 April 2000 (aged 67) Tegucigalpa, Honduras
- Spouse: Carlota Márquez de Paz García
- Children: 5

Policarpo Juan Paz García (7 December 1932 – 16 April 2000) was a Honduran military leader who served as President of Honduras from 1978 to 1982, after overthrowing Juan Alberto Melgar Castro. During his presidency he worked with drug traffickers, the Central Intelligence Agency, and the Contras.

== Early life and education ==
Policarpo Paz García was born in La Arada, Goascorán, Honduras, on 7 December 1932, to Eusebio Paz and Elena García. Paz was educated at the School of the Americas.

== Military ==
Hondurans fighting for the Inter-American Peace Force in the Dominican Republic were led by Paz. He was promoted to colonel for his service during the Football War.

== Presidency ==
Honduras was led by military dictators starting in 1963. Paz was chief of the armed forces under President Juan Alberto Melgar Castro. Melgar was overthrown by the Supreme Council of the Armed Forces (SCAF) on 7 August 1978. Paz, who was among the three leaders of SCAF, was made president.

Juan Matta-Ballesteros was a major financial supporter of the coup and the coup increased the political power of cocaine traffickers in Honduras. Paz a was key contact for Duane Clarridge, the chief of the Central Intelligence Agency's operations in Latin America.

Honduras was used as a base against the Sandinista National Liberation Front during the Nicaraguan Revolution under Paz. The CIA armed and trained Contras in Honduras. These policies were continued after Paz left office and around 7,000 Contras were in Honduras by 1983.

The National Party of Honduras (PNH) was backed by Paz and his military government. However, the PNH lost the elections for the Constituent Assembly in 1980, to the opposition Liberal Party of Honduras. The assembly was given control of the government by the military junta on 20 June and it made Paz provisional president on 25 July. Roberto Suazo Córdova won the presidency in the 1981 election.

=== Human rights ===
Committee for the Defense of Human Rights in Honduras reported that 51 people were killed by Paz's government. This consisted of 31 Salvadorans, 17 Hondurans, and one each of Costa Ricans, Guatemalans, and Venezuelans.

Battalion 3-16, a death squad that murdered suspected leftists, was formed by Paz.

Angel Manfredo Velasquez Rodriguez was disappeared and murdered by Paz's government. The Inter-American Court of Human Rights ruled in Velásquez Rodríguez v. Honduras on 29 July 1988, that the Honduran government under Paz violated the human rights of Rodriguez. It was the first time that the court ruled that a government was guilty. President José Azcona del Hoyo agreed to pay the damages that the court awarded to Rodriguez's family.

== Personal life ==
Paz married Carlota Márquez de Paz García, with whom he had five children. Paz sought treatment for his diabetes and kidney failure in Cuba, but died in Tegucigalpa on 16 April 2000.

== Works cited ==
=== Books ===
- Salehyan, Idean (2009). Rebels without Borders: Transnational Insurgencies in World Politics. Cornell University Press. ISBN 9780801447440.
- Scott, Peter; Marshall, Jonathan (1991). Cocaine Politics: Drugs, Armies, and the CIA in Central America. University of California Press. ISBN 9780520214491.

=== Journals ===
- Anderson, Thomas (1988). "Politics and the Military in Honduras". Current History. 87 (533). University of California Press: 425–428. doi:10.2307/45316147. JSTOR 45316147.
- Ruhl, J. (1996). "Redefining Civil-Military Relations in Honduras". Journal of Interamerican Studies and World Affairs. 38 (1). Cambridge University Press: 33–66. doi:10.2307/166395. JSTOR 166395.

=== News ===
- "Murió exmandatario hondureño". La Nación. 17 April 2000. Archived from the original on 27 May 2026.
- Cooper, Linda (29 June 2009). "Honduran coup leader a two-time SOA graduate". National Catholic Reporter. Archived from the original on 27 May 2026.
- Dickey, Christopher (21 April 1980). "Opposition Party Is Surprise Winner In Honduran Voting". The Washington Post.
- Estrada, Oscar (18 September 2019). "Honduras (1954-1982): El retorno de los liberales al poder y las dictaduras militares". El Pulso. Archived from the original on 27 May 2026.

=== Web ===
- "Honduras (1902-present)". University of Central Arkansas. Archived from the original on 7 February 2017.
- Fernández, Tomás; Tamaro, Elena (2004). "Policarpo Paz García". Biografías y Vidas. Archived from the original on 27 May 2026.

Political offices
Preceded by Juan Alberto Melgar; Head of State	President of Honduras; 1978–1982	Succeeded by Roberto Suazo
