= Hedme Castro =

Hedme Fátima Castro Vargas (born 22 November 1959, in Choluteca, Honduras) is a woman human rights defender promoting human, civil and political rights in Honduras. For her work as a human rights defender, she has been subject to repeated attacks.

== Early life ==
At 17 years old, Castro became Primary School teacher. From that moment, she became actively involved in teachers' movements for the defense of quality public education, which fought among other things for a legislation to codify teachers' professional status (Estatuto del Docente). She has worked as a pedagogue at all educational levels. She has worked in the National Pedagogical University of Honduras.

== Activism ==
Castro is the General Coordinator of the Asociación para una Ciudadanía Participativa - ACI Participa, an organisation promoting citizen participation in decision-making, as well as the knowledge and exercise of civil and political rights. ACI Participa also urges governmental institutions to act under the principles of social equality and to transparently administer their resources. ACI-Participa has a Unit for the Protection of Defenders and Defenders of Human Rights that works at the national level, in the 18 departments of Honduras, defending the Right to Justice; Rights of the LGBTIQ Community; Labor rights; Defense of the Earth and of feeding; Defense of the Environment; Rights of the Original Peoples; Right to Freedom Expression; Education rights.

For her commitment to the defense and respect of human rights in Honduras, Castro has been systematically persecuted. On 1 March 2017, Castro was arbitrarily detained at Tegucigalpa's Toncontín International Airport on her way to take part in an event organised by the UN Human Rights Council and meetings with EU authorities in Brussels. On 7 April 2017, Castro's car was sabotaged. On 8 September 2017, Castro and three other human rights defenders, Ariel Díaz, Carlos del Cid and Tommy Morales, were attacked by police officers and arbitrarily detained while providing support to students detained in the Universidad Nacional Autónoma de Honduras – UNAH (National Autonomous University of Honduras), in Tegucigalpa. They were subject to cruel and inhuman treatment, which left them with serious long-term health consequences. Since she was a child, Castro has suffered from asthma which as a result of tear gas, has been aggravated ever since.

== See also ==
- Human rights in Honduras
