= Committee for the Defense of Human Rights in Honduras =

The Committee for the Defense of Human Rights in Honduras (CODEH, Spanish: Comité para la Defensa de los Derechos Humanos en Honduras) is a human rights NGO in Honduras founded in 1981.

== Background ==
Honduras had a history of several coups d'etat and military governments during the second half of the twentieth century. A civilian government was elected in 1981, but human rights violations continued. The military unit Battalion 3-16, which received training and support from the United States Central Intelligence Agency both in Honduras and at U.S. military bases and in Chile during the presidency of the dictator Augusto Pinochet, carried out political assassinations and torture of suspected political opponents of the government. Amnesty International estimated that at least 184 people were "disappeared" from 1980 to 1992 in Honduras, most likely by the Honduran military.

== Creation ==
The organization was created in May 1981 by Ramón Custodio Lopez, a medical doctor and surgeon and founding member of the Medical College of Honduras. He remained the leader of CODEH until 1999.

== Aims ==
CODEH's human rights aims were initially narrowly focused, but during the 1990s extended to economic and social human rights.

== Structure and leadership ==
Andrés Pavón Murillo has been president of the organization since 1999. In the spring of 2009 Manuel Zelaya invited the organization's leader Andrés Pavón to a meeting. The two talked about Zelaya's constitutional modification plans as well as re-election, according to Pavón. Pavón "became pro-Zelaya" after the meeting.

== Government responses ==
During the 1980s, the organization "withstood harassment and intimidation by Honduran security forces". Following testimony that CODEH regional director in northern Honduras, Miguel Ángel Pavón Salazar, gave against the Honduran government in October 1987 before the Inter-American Court of Human Rights (IACHR), he was shot dead on 14 January 1988. The Council of the Inter-Parliamentary Union found that "initial findings" linked the killing with Ángel Pavon's IACHR testimony and stated that former Battalion 3-16 member Fausto Reyes Caballero had declared the names of Battalion 3-16 members responsible for Ángel Pavon's assassination.

The present president the organization, Andrés Pavón Murillo, has had three legal cases against him and one attempt was made to kill him because of his human rights activities.

== CODEH reports ==
In mid-2006, CODEH reported that seven former members of Battalion 3-16 (Billy Joya, Alvaro Romero, Erick Sánchez, Onofre Oyuela Oyuela, Napoleón Nassar Herrera, Vicente Rafael Canales Nuñez, Salomón Escoto Salinas and René Maradianga Panchamé) occupied important positions in the administration of President Manuel Zelaya.

On 11 November 2009, Andrés Pavón stated that the Honduran military planned to disguise soldiers as a fake armed wing of the National Resistance Front against the coup d'etat in Honduras that would massacre members of the Democratic Civic Union on 29 November 2009, the day of the planned Honduran general election, with the goal of discrediting the National Resistance Front and creating a cycle of lethal violence between pro- and anti-coup civilian groups. Pavón said that military officers "loyal to the Honduran people" had informed him about the plan and stated that the plan is to be carried out by supporters of the de facto government.
