= Velásquez Rodríguez v. Honduras =

1988 Opinion of the Inter-American Court of Human Rights

- Court: Inter-American Court of Human Rights
- Full case name: Case of Velásquez-Rodríguez v. Honduras
- Decided: July 26, 1988

Court membership
- Judges sitting: Rafael Nieto-Navia, President; Héctor Gros Espiell, Vice President; Rodolfo E. Piza E., Judge; Thomas Buergenthal, Judge; Pedro Nikken, Judge; Héctor Fix-Zamudio, Judge; Rigoberto Espinal Irías, Judge ad hoc
- Chief judge: Rafael Nieto-Navia

Velásquez Rodríguez v. Honduras is a landmark case that was decided by the Inter-American Court of Human Rights (IACHR) in 1988. It is a seminal case in the realm of international human rights law that is known for its analysis of state responsibility for enforced disappearances. Its reasoning has influenced other international human rights tribunals, including the African Commission on Human and Peoples' Rights and the European Court of Human Rights.

== Background ==
Angel Manfredo Velásquez Rodríguez was a student at the Universidad Nacional Autónoma de Honduras during the Policarpo Paz García administration. He was involved in student activism against the government. On September 12, 1981, between 4:30 and 5:00 PM, Velásquez Rodríguez was abducted in Tegucigalpa. Eyewitnesses to the abduction said several armed men pushed him into a car with tinted windows and without a license plate.

Velásquez Rodríguez was never seen or heard from again, and the Honduran government denied any knowledge of his whereabouts.

== Decision ==
In 1988, the IACHR determined that Honduras was liable for the disappearance of Velásquez Rodríguez. The Court reasoned that the state violated its duties under the American Convention on Human Rights by not conducting an effective investigation into the circumstances surrounding Velásquez Rodríguez's disappearance. Honduras fully complied with the order to pay restitution to Velásquez Rodríguez's family, and the case was closed on September 10, 1996.
