= 1980 Honduran Constituent Assembly election =

Constituent Assembly elections were held in Honduras on 20 April 1980. In July the Assembly elected Policarpo Paz García as president.

Civilian rule was established in 1980, replacing rule by the military. Following the Constituent Assembly elections, the first general elections since 1971 were held in 1981.

== Results ==
Party	Votes	%	Seats
Liberal Party	495,779	51.68	35
National Party	423,623	44.15	33
Innovation and Unity Party	35,052	3.65	3
Independents	4,948	0.52	0
Total	959,402	100.00	71
Valid votes	959,402	95.61	
Invalid/blank votes	44,068	4.39	
Total votes	1,003,470	100.00	
Registered voters/turnout	1,233,756	81.33	
Source: Nohlen

== Aftermath ==
On 25 July the Constituent Assembly elected a new president. With the Liberal Party unable to gain a majority, a compromised was reached for Policarpo Paz García, who had been president since 1978, to remain in office until direct elections could be held the following year.

== Bibliography ==
- Anderson, Thomas P. Politics in Central America: Guatemala, El Salvador, Honduras, and Nicaragua. New York: Praeger. Revised edition. 1988.
- Anderson, Thomas P. “Politics and the military in Honduras.” Current history 87, 533:425+ (December 1988). 1988.
- Becerra, Longino. Evolución histórica de Honduras. Tegucigalpa: Baktun Editorial. 1983.
- Bertrand Anduray, María Luisa Soto de. Historia de la mujer hondureña: época independiente. Tegucigalpa: Instituto Hondureño de Cultura Hispánica. 1992.
- Binns, Jack R. The United States in Honduras, 1980-1981: an ambassador’s memoir. Jefferson: McFarland & Company, Inc. 2000.
- Bueso, Julio Antonio. El subdesarrollo hondureño. Tegucigalpa: Editorial Universitaria. 1987.
- Elections in the Americas A Data Handbook Volume 1. North America, Central America, and the Caribbean. Edited by Dieter Nohlen. 2005.
- Fernández, Arturo. Partidos políticos y elecciones en Honduras 1980. Tegucigalpa: Editorial Guaymuras. Second edition. 1983.
- Izaguirre, Ramón. “Análisis del caso de Honduras.” Sistemas de elecciones parlamentarias y su relación con la gobernabilidad democrática. 2000. San José: Instituto Interamericano de Derechos Humanos. 2000.
- Leonard, Thomas M. “The quest for Central American democracy since 1945.” Assessing democracy in Latin America. 1998. Boulder: Westview Press. 1998.
- Morris, James A. Honduran electoral politics and military rule: the geopolitics of Central America. Washington: Department of State, Office of External Research. 1981.
- Morris, James A. Honduras: caudillo politics and military rulers. Boulder: Westview Press.
- Lapper, Richard. Honduras: state for sale. London: Latin America Bureau. 1985.
- Pearson, Neale J. “Honduras.” Latin America and Caribbean contemporary record I:439-454 (1981–1982).
- Political handbook of the world 1980. New York, 1981.
- Posas, Mario. “El proceso de democratización en Honduras.” Estudios sociales centroamericanos. 47:61-78 (mayo-agosto 1988). 1988.
- Sabillón Pineda de Flores, Milady. La mujer en los partidos políticos. Tegucigalpa: Alin. 1998.
- Santana, Nelson. “Elections and beyond.” NACLA report on the Americas 15, 6:30-36 (November–December 1981).
- Schooley, Helen. Conflict in Central America. Harlow: Longman. 1987.
- Schulz, Donald E. and Deborah Sundloff Schulz. The United States, Honduras, and the crisis in Central America. Boulder: Westview Press. 1994.
- Sieder, Rachel. Elecciones y democratización en Honduras desde 1980. Tegucigalpa: Editorial Universitaria. 1998.
- Taylor-Robinson, Michelle M. “La política hondureña y las elecciones de 2005.” Revista de ciencia política 26, 1:114-124 (2006).
- Vallejo Hernández, Hilario René. Crisis histórica del poder político en Honduras: 168 años de ‘Coquimbos’ y ‘Cachurecos.’ Honduras: Ultra-Graph. 1990.
