= Gustavo Álvarez Martínez =

Honduran military officer

Gustavo Adolfo Álvarez Martínez
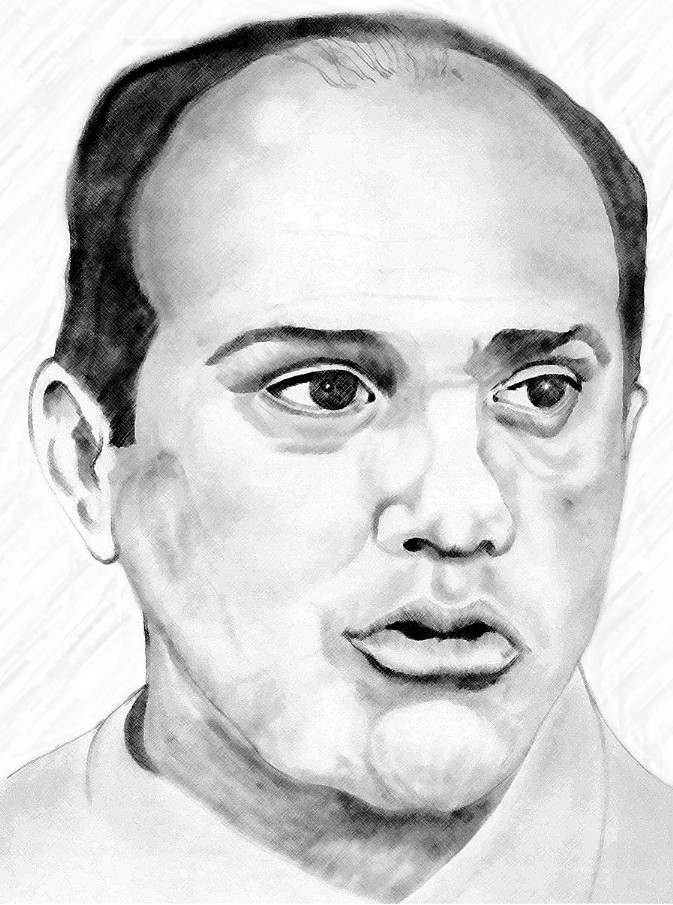
- Born: 12 December 1937
- Died: 25 January 1989
- Military career
- Service years: January 1982 – 31 March 1984 (head of armed forces)
- Rank: Brigadier-General
- Awards: Legion of Merit

Gustavo Adolfo Álvarez Martínez (12 December 1937 – 25 January 1989) was a Honduran military officer. He was head of the armed forces of Honduras from January 1982 until his ouster on 31 March 1984 by fellow officers when he sought to expand his control over the armed forces. The notorious Honduran Battalion 3-16 army unit, reporting directly to Álvarez Martínez, was active during this period, in which Honduras was a base for the Contras who opposed the Sandinistas in neighbouring Nicaragua. Álvarez Martínez was awarded the Legion of Merit by the US government in 1983 for "encouraging the success of democratic processes in Honduras." In March 1984 fellow generals accusing him of abuses sent him into exile. He became a consultant to the Pentagon, and lived in Miami until 1988, when he returned to Honduras. Álvarez Martínez was assassinated in Honduras in 1989 by leftwing guerillas.

== Biography ==
Álvarez Martínez was the brother of Armando Álvarez Martínez, Minister of Culture under Policarpo Paz García, President of Honduras 1978–1982. He was born in Tela, trained in Argentina in the 1960s at the Colegio Militar de la Nación, and returned to Honduras in 1961, traveling to the capital of Honduras, Tegucigalpa. He graduated from the School of the Americas in 1976.

Álvarez Martínez later became commander of the Fuerza de Seguridad Publica (FUSEP), the national police force (a branch of the military) under which Battalion 3–16 was initially created. The first trainers of the battalion came from Argentina, invited by Álvarez Martínez, under what some have called "Operation Charly". Álvarez's chief of staff, General José Bueso Rosa, described the US role in setting up the unit: "It was their idea to create an intelligence unit that reported directly to the head of the armed forces..." CIA training for the unit "was confirmed by Richard Stolz, then-deputy director for operations, in secret testimony before the United States Senate Select Committee on Intelligence in June 1988."

In February 1981, while still commander of FUSEP but already chosen as the next head of the armed forces, Álvarez Martínez told US Ambassador Jack R. Binns "that 'extralegal' methods might be necessary to 'take care' of subversives, [...] and praised the 'Argentine method' of dealing with the problem, which Binns took to refer to the kidnappings and disappearances of thousands of government opponents." In July 1983, he told NBC producer Maurie Moore and The Washington Post reporter Christopher Dickey that in his mind, "everything you do to destroy a Marxist regime is moral." "A 1994 report by Oscar Valladares, a lawyer appointed by the Honduran parliament to investigate human rights abuse, blamed the Honduran Army and the contras for 174 disappearances and kidnappings in the 1980s. Most of the incidents took place before the March 1984 ouster of Alvarez as armed forces chief."

In 1983 "a dissident Honduran army officer accused Alvarez of masterminding 'death squads,'" and in 1996 a CIA report found that 'the Honduran military committed most of the hundreds of human rights abuses reported in Honduras' between 1980 and 1984. The report added that 'death squads' linked to the military had used tactics such as 'killings, kidnapping and torture' to deal with people suspected of supporting leftist guerrillas." Possible victims of this period include the American missionary Father James Carney, with Florencio Caballero, a former member of Battalion 3-16, testifying that Alvarez had ordered his death.

Álvarez Martínez was at one time president of the Asociación para el Progreso de Honduras (APROH), an organization linking business leaders and military personnel.

== See also ==
- CIA activities in Honduras
- History of Honduras (1982–present)
