= Nelson Willy Mejía Mejía =

Honduran military officer

Nelson Willy Mejía Mejía is a Honduran military officer who worked in the controversial Battalion 3-16 and government employee who is currently Director-General of Immigration.

== Military career ==
Nelson Willy Mejía Mejía was one of at least 19 members of the death squad Intelligence Battalion 3-16 who trained at the School of the Americas (SOA) in the United States. He was also an instructor at the SOA. The human rights NGO COFADEH stated that during the 1980s, Nelson Willy Mejía Mejía was responsible for "7 thousand profiles" of persecuted Hondurans who later disappeared.

In February 1998, a judge in Honduras seized Battalion 3-16 files for use in a trial against Nelson Willy Mejía Mejía.

== Civil career ==
Nelson Willy Mejía Mejía was appointed Director-General of Immigration in the interim government of Roberto Micheletti, following the 2009 Honduran constitutional crisis.
