= Donald E. Worcester =

American historian

Donald E. Worcester (1915–2003) was an American historian who specialized in Southwestern United States and Latin American history. He was president of the Western History Association from 1974 to 1975.

Worcester graduated from Bard College in 1939. He received an M.A. from the University of California, Berkeley in 1941. He then served in the US Naval Reserve in World War II. He received a PhD. from Berkeley in 1947.

From 1947 until 1963 he was a professor at the University of Florida. He then was a professor at Texas Christian University and history department chair. From 1960 until 1965 he was managing editor of the Hispanic American Historical Review.

Worcester's view that history is made of complexities, not dualities, is seen as foundational for much of the understanding by later scholars of Southwest United States history.

== Books ==
- Sea Power and Chilean Independence (1962)
- Brazil: From Colony to World Power (1973)
- Bolivar (Boston: Little, Brown, 1977; this work was aimed at the general reader and has been called a solid treatment of the subject)
- The Apaches: Eagles of the Southwest (1979)
- The Chisholm Trail: High Road of the Cattle Kingdom (1980)
- The War in the Nueces Strip (1989)

== Sources ==
- Western History Association bio of Worcester
