= James Carney (American priest) =

American missionary

- Church: Latin Church

Orders
- Ordination: 1961

Personal details
- Born: 1924 Chicago, Illinois
- Died: 1983 (aged 58–59) Honduras
- Denomination: Roman Catholic church
- Occupation: Priest; PRTC chaplain; Guerilla

James Francis Carney (1924−1983) was an American Catholic priest and missionary who ministered to peasants and left-wing insurgents in Honduras before being killed in that country's armed conflict in 1983.

== Life ==
Carney was born in Chicago to parents of German and Irish ancestry. His father was a salesman for the Burroughs Adding Machine Corporation, and the family moved around frequently. Carney graduated from St. Louis University High School in Missouri in 1942 and went on to Saint Louis University on a football scholarship. Despite poor vision and a football-related knee injury, he was drafted and saw service in the European Theatre of World War II as a combat engineer and military policeman.

After the war, he took advantage of the G.I. Bill to return to SLU to study theology, then transferred to the University of Detroit the following year before finally ending up at St. Stanislaus Seminary in Florissant, Missouri in 1948. He spent three years as a missionary in British Honduras (today Belize) beginning in 1955 before returning to the United States to study at St. Mary's College in Kansas.

After being ordained into the Jesuit order in 1961, Carney was sent by the Missouri Province of the Society of Jesus to work with impoverished Hondurans. He eventually naturalized as a Honduran citizen and reportedly renounced his U.S. citizenship. Nevertheless, he was expelled to Nicaragua by the Honduran government in 1979.

In Nicaragua, he ministered to members of the Revolutionary Party of Central American Workers (PRTC). He eventually became chaplain to a group of PRTC fighters who had been trained by Cuba in the P-11 and P-13 insurgency training camps in Pinar del Rio, Cuba—joining with the group in Nicaragua and returning with them to Honduras in 1983.

== Death ==
According to PRTC deserters, morale in the group sagged as the insurgents traveled from Nicaragua, across the Río Coco to Honduras, and began a brutal four-day march to the top of the barren Olancho mountain range above the river. They ran low on supplies, and as described by the PRTC insurgent commander, Dr. José María Reyes Mata, in his diary..."to celebrate the victory of the march, we ate the last of our rations".

Carney clashed with Mata, the group's commander, when he valiantly but vainly tried to defend the life of one of the young insurgents accused of attempted desertion. According to insurgents later interviewed by US Defense Attaché Office Assistant Army Attaché Captain Ronald Glass, Carney grew disheartened by the actions of the atheist insurgent commander Dr. Mata, both by the summary execution of the deserter in front of the remaining men, and then by being prohibited by Mata to minister spiritually to the men, eventually prohibited from performing mass.

U.S embassy documents, citing interviews with PRTC deserters suggest that, as the Honduran military closed in on the group, the 60 plus year old Carney grew physically weak, barely being able to walk even a hundred meters before having to rest. The priest, not wanting to endanger, slowdown or burden the now fragmented group, selflessly sacrificed himself, reportedly telling his companions to leave him behind. According to the last two insurgents claiming to have seen him alive, he was left in a hammock, hidden under a triple canopy jungle in the Patuca region, where he presumably died, alone, exposed to the elements and without food.

This official version based on interviews with insurgent survivors, is contradicted in news reports echoed from testimony of a man characterized in media as an exiled former intelligence officer Florencio Cabadero who claimed that Carney was captured, tortured, and then thrown to his death from a helicopter by members of the Honduran Army's elite Battalion 316. Eric Haney, who was stationed in Honduras as a member of the Delta Force at the time, reported 'hearing' the same reports, that Carney was tortured and killed by the military. In his book Inside Delta Force, Haney claims credit for killing former Green Beret David Arturo Baez in the final firefight that saw Carney captured (The Battle of Yolo Valley, Honduras). Since the publication of his book and claim Haney has been roundly admonished by the U.S. Special Forces community for fabricating the story of his killing Baez.

Another report echoes the same claims that Baez and Carney were taken alive by Honduran forces. However, unnamed sources claiming to be linked to the U.S. Embassy in Honduras have purportedly offered that Carney, along with Baez, a Nicaraguan-American Sandinista serving as a military adviser to the guerrilla column, were captured. According to these unsourced reports, both he and Baez were interrogated at a small dirt landing strip in Honduras along with surviving members of the column. Carney and Baez were ordered to be executed by the country's government or military. According to unnamed sources, represented as "U.S. MilGrp officers then stationed in Honduras", the execution of Baez and Carney is alleged to have been carried out by the first Honduran Special Forces officer to have graduated the U.S. Special Warfare course at Fort Bragg, North Carolina. The order from the Honduran military commander was that "all officers are to have blood on their hands" in order to ensure silence.

According to these same unsourced reports, the bodies of the two Americans were, along with those others killed, flown back over the border on a Honduran military helicopter into Nicaragua and unceremoniously dumped into the triple canopy jungle below.

== Aftermath ==
Carney's family traveled to Honduras shortly after learning of his death but were unable to recover his body or any information. Baez's family, living in Florida, have long demanded the truth about the former Green Beret's death.

Later in 1983, the army officer implicated by Cabadero in ordering Carney's death, General Gustavo Álvarez Martínez, was awarded the Legion of Merit by President Ronald Reagan, "for promoting democracy in Honduras" at the same time the Cuban trained and Sandinista PRTC 96 man insurgent group has crossed over in to Honduras to overthrow the civilian government of Honduran President, Dr Roberto Suazo Córdova, the first democratically elected civilian government for Honduras in many decades. Nevertheless, some of Carney's former colleagues believe the award is evidence that then U.S Ambassador to Honduras, John Negroponte, authorized Carney's killing.

Father Joseph Mulligan, a close friend of Carney, sent, in 2010, a letter to President Barack Obama and Secretary of State Hillary Clinton requesting their assistance in seeing his FOIA request, now being processed, approved.

== See also ==
- The Ambassador, 2005 film
