= Leszek Szymowski =

Investigative journalist

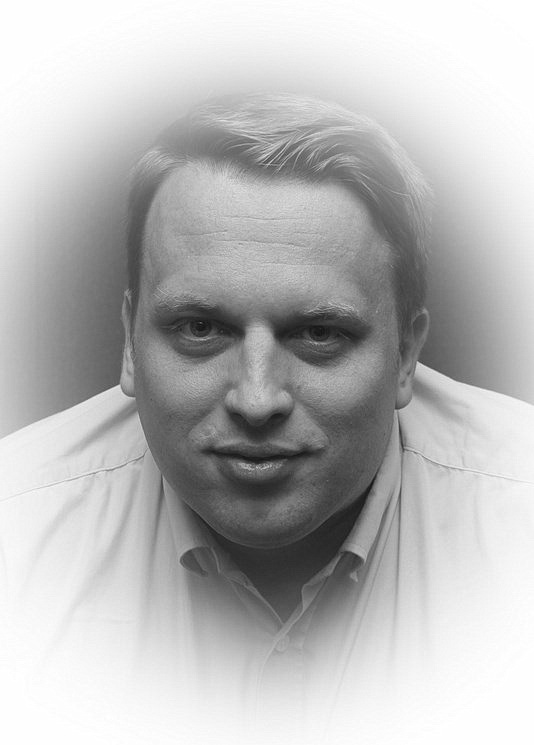
- Born: 9 May 1981 (age 45); Kraków, Poland
- Education: University of Warsaw
- Occupations: Journalist, author

Leszek Szymowski (born 9 May 1981) is a Polish investigative journalist, photographer and traveller. He is author of the articles, documentary movies and books about behind the scenes of unknown political, international and economic scandals in eastern Europe countries. Author of many books and series of publications.

== Early life and education ==
He graduated at Warsaw University, faculty of journalism and political sciences, and then in East European Studies (specialisations: Russia and Eastern Europe). He has a further degree (MBA) from the Warsaw School of Economics.

== Career in journalism ==
=== Investigative journalism ===
Since 2005 he has been publishing at newspapers in Poland including Wprost, and The Finance Weekly. Since 2007 he has been an investigative journalist of Angora weekly, where he revealed the biggest scandals: the behind the scenes of murder of police chief Marek Papała, the kidnapping of Krzysztof Olewnik, the economic scandals, the expansion of Gazprom and Russian mafia in Eastern Europe. In 2011 he published in "Angora" weekly a serie of articles about CIA's secret prisons in Europe. After that, the Prosecutors Office wanted to accuse him for disclosure the state's secrecy, but finally didn't do it. The journalist claimed that the former polish General Prosecutor Zbigniew Ziobro was to be accused because of this scandal. Ziobro decided to accuse the journalist by private indictment, but finally lost in the court.

=== Investigative of Jerzy Popiełuszko assassination ===
Since he began his career as an investigative journalist in 2005 at Gazeta Polska, Szymowski wrote about fuel scandals and the unknown circumstances surrounding the murder of Father Jerzy Popiełuszko.

=== Investigative of 2010 Polish Air Force Tu-154 crash ===
In 2011 he published the book "Attack in Smolensk" (2010 Polish Air Force Tu-154 crash), which became bestseller in Poland (with the circulation of more than 100 000). He published unknown facts and concluded, that two explosions were the reason of aircraft and polish president Lech Kaczyński was murdered by russian and polish secret services, because he tried to prevent the new contract for gas supplies between Poland and Russia, which was unfavorable for Poland.

== Works ==
- (2011) "The forbidden history" (origin: Zakazana historia), co-authors: Jan Piński, Leszek Pietrzak, Rafał Przedmojski, Antoni Wręga, Dominik Smyrgała. ISBN 9788362908134
- (2011) "The Attack in Smolensk (org. "Zamach w Smoleńsku" (Publishing House), ISBN 978-83-932704-0-8
- (2011) "The empire of waste. Where our money disappears" (original. Imperium marnotrawstwa. Gdzie znikają nasze pieniadze) (Penelopa), ISBN 978-83-62908-16-5
- (2012) The agents of secret police against pope John Paul the Second (original: „Agenci SB kontra Jan Paweł II” (Penelopa), ISBN 978-83-62908-24-0
- (2012) "Medias and communist secret service" (original Media wobec bezpieki) (Bollinari Publishing House), ISBN 9788393270460
- (2013) "The operation "Smolensk" (original:„Operacja Smoleńsk” (wyd. 3S Media),ISBN 978-83-61935-96-4
- (2013) ""To kill the commendant" (orig. Zabić komendanta. Kulisy zabójstwa generała Marka Papały" (CapitalBook), ISBN 978-83-64037-99-3
- (2013) "The serial suicider" "Seryjny Samobójca" (Bollinari Publishing House),ISBN 978-8363865-05-4
- (2013) The matrimonial cheater" "Oszust matrymonialny" (Bollinari Publishing House),ISBN 978-83-63865-64-1
- (2014) "HomoTerror" (Bollinari Publishing House), ISBN 978-83-63865-21-4
- (2014) "Poland hasn't died, we are alive" (original: „Polska nie zginęła… my żyjemy” – wywiad rzeka z Romualdem Szeremietiewem (Nobilis),ISBN 9788360297612
- (2015) "The forbidden investigation. How the investigation about the attempt on John Paul the Second was blocked" "Zakazane śledztwo. Jak torpedowano dochodzenie do prawdy o zamachu na Jana Pawła II" (Nobilis), ISBN 8360297630
- (2016) "The priest-killers" "Księżobójcy. Anatomia zbrodni" (Editions Spotkania),ISBN 978-83-7965-212-9
- (2019) "The Entangled. NOn - authorised biography of Zbigniew Ziobro" (Nobilis Publishing House)
- (2020)"Operation "The round table" (CapitalBook)
