= Battalion 3-16 (Honduras) =

Honduran army unit that carried out torture and assassinations of political opponents

Battalion 3–16
- Battallón 316
- Active: 1979—2002
- Country: Honduras
- Allegiance: Argentine Anticommunist Alliance; Central Intelligence Agency; Chile
- Branch: Honduran Army
- Type: Death Squad

Intelligence Battalion 3–16 or Battallón 316 (various names: Group of 14 (1979–1981), Special Investigations Branch (DIES) (1982–1983), Intelligence Battalion 3–16 (from 1982 or 1984 to 1986), Intelligence and Counter-Intelligence Branch (since 1987)) was the name of a Honduran Army unit responsible for carrying out political assassinations and torture of suspected political opponents of the government during the 1980s.

Battalion members received training and support from the United States Central Intelligence Agency both in Honduras and at US military bases, Battalion 601 (including Juan Ciga Correa), who had collaborated with the Chilean DINA in assassinating General Carlos Prats and had trained, along with Mohamed Alí Seineldín, the Argentine Anticommunist Alliance. At least 19 Battalion 3–16 members were graduates of the School of the Americas. The Battalion 3–16 was also trained by Pinochet's Chile.

The name indicated the unit's service to three military units and twenty three battalions of the Honduran army. The reorganisation of the unit under the name "Intelligence Battalion 3–16" is attributed to General Gustavo Álvarez Martínez.

== 1980s ==
According to the human rights NGO COFADEH, Battalion 3–16 was created in 1979 with the name "Group of 14". In 1982, its name was changed to the "Special Investigations Branch (DIES)", commanded by "Señor Diez" (Mr. Ten).

Beginning in 1982, Battalion 3-16 agents detained hundreds of leftist activists, including students, teachers, unionists, and suspected guerrillas who were then disappeared. The members of the unit dressed in plain clothes and often disguised themselves with masks, wigs, false beards, and mustaches. Armed with Uzi sub-machine guns or pistols, they surveilled their victims, abducted them, and then sped off in double-cab Toyota pickup trucks with tinted windows and stolen license plates. Many of the abductions occurred during the daytime and in full view of witnesses. The detainees were taken to the Battalion's secret prisons, where they were stripped naked, bound at the hands and feet, blindfolded, and tortured. The torture Battalion 3-16 used included electric shocks, submerging in water, and suffocation.

In 1982, according to requests for US declassified documents by the National Commissioner for Human Rights in Honduras, or in 1984 according to COFADEH, its name was changed to the "Intelligence Battalion 3–16". The reorganisation of the unit under the name "Intelligence Battalion 3–16" is attributed to General Gustavo Álvarez Martínez.

From 1987 until at least 2002, it was called the "Intelligence and Counter-Intelligence Branch".

=== Links with Argentina ===
Gustavo Alvarez Martínez, at that time a colonel, studied at the Argentine Military College, graduating in 1961. By the end of 1981 (i.e. during the Dirty War in Argentina during which up to 30,000 people were disappeared by Argentine security forces and death squads) more than 150 Argentine officers were in Honduras. This training operation took the code-name of Operation Charly and used training bases in Lepaterique and Quilalí. Argentines provided expertise in physical torture.

The Central Intelligence Agency took over from the Argentinians after the 1982 Falklands War, although Argentine officers remained active in Honduras until 1984–1986. The Argentine Navy's ESMA also sent instructors to Honduras, including Roberto Alfieri González who served in the National Guard of El Salvador as well as in Guatemala and Honduras.

=== Links with the United States ===
Battalion 3-16 worked closely with CIA operatives. Although during training sessions, the agency emphasized psychological torture, the CIA adviser referred to as "Mr. Mike" told 3-16 agent Florencio Caballero that electric shocks were "the most efficient way to get someone to talk when they resisted". Moreover, the unit's commander, General Alvarez, told interrogators that psychological torture was not effective and ordered them to use physical torture instead.

A former prisoner of the 3-16, Ines Murillo, claimed in an interview that during her captivity she had often been tortured in the presence of the CIA adviser, "Mr. Mike", and that he at one time submitted questions to ask her. In June 1988, CIA deputy director for operations Richard Stolz, testified that a CIA official had visited the prison where Murillo was being held. She also accused New York Times reporter James LeMoyne of distortions and falsehoods in the reporting of her interview. She stated that his reporting had "caused great damage" and "could be used to justify the kidnapping, disappearance and assassination of hundreds of people." A whistleblower who deserted Battalion 316 asserted that Father James Carney, a liberation theologian priest, was executed by order of General Álvarez, and that "Álvarez Martínez gave the order for Carney’s execution in the presence of a CIA officer, known as 'Mister Mike.'" Ten years later, one senior State Department official was willing to concede in private the U.S. role in the disappearances. "The green light was kill a commie," said the official. "Everybody was winking and nodding."

The US Ambassador to Honduras at the time, John Negroponte, met frequently with General Gustavo Alvarez Martínez. In summarising declassified US documents showing telegrams (cables) sent and received by Negroponte during his period as US Ambassador to Honduras, the National Security Archive states that "reporting on human rights atrocities" committed by Battalion 3–16 is "conspicuously absent from the cable traffic" and that "Negroponte's cables reflect no protest, or even discussion of these issues during his many meetings with General Alvarez, his deputies and Honduran President Robert Suazo. Nor do the released cables contain any reporting to Washington on the human rights abuses that were taking place."

== 1990s ==
In 2002, COFADEH stated that "Many retired or active 3–16 agents have been included as intelligence advisors in the National Prevention Police."

== 2000s ==
Seven former members of Battalion 3–16 (Billy Joya, Alvaro Romero, Erick Sánchez, Onofre Oyuela Oyuela, Napoleón Nassar Herrera, Vicente Rafael Canales Nuñez, Salomón Escoto Salinas and René Maradianga Panchamé) occupied important positions in the administration of President Manuel Zelaya as of mid-2006, according to the human rights organisation CODEH.

Following the 2009 coup d'état, in which Zelaya was detained and exiled by Honduran military units, Zelaya claimed that Battalion 3–16 was again operating, with a different name, and being led by Joya, who became a direct advisor to de facto President Roberto Micheletti. Zelaya stated (translation), "With a different name, [Battalion 3–16 is] already operating. The crimes being committed is torture to create fear among the population, and that's being directed by Mr. Joya." In addition, Nelson Willy Mejía Mejía was appointed by Micheletti as Director of Immigration, Napoleón Nassar Herrera (or Nazar) is a spokesperson for dialogue for the Secretary of Security.

== Freedom of Information requests ==
Using freedom of information laws, efforts were made by various people to obtain documentary records of the role of the United States with respect to Battalion 3–16. For example, on 3 December 1996, members of United States Congress, including Tom Lantos, Joseph P. Kennedy II, Cynthia McKinney, Richard J. Durbin, John Conyers and others, asked President Bill Clinton for "the expeditious and complete declassification of all U.S. documents pertaining to human rights violations in Honduras" and claimed that "The U.S. government ... helped to establish, train and equip Battalion 3–16, military unit which was responsible for the kidnapping, torture, disappearance and murder of at least 184 Honduran students, professors, journalists, human rights activists and others in the 1980s."

== See also ==
- Death squad
- The Torture Manuals
- Torture
- Honduras
- John Negroponte
