= Billy Joya =

Former national security advisor for the Honduran government

- Born: Billy Fernando Joya Améndola
- Military career
- Allegiance: Honduras
- Branch: Armed Forces of Honduras
- Service years: c. 1970s – 1990s
- Known for: Member of the Honduran death squad Intelligence Battalion 3-16
- Other work: National security adviser

Billy Fernando Joya Améndola (known as Billy Joya) is a former Honduran military officer who worked in the controversial Battalion 3-16 and is national security adviser for Manuel Zelaya's government.

== Military career ==
One of four children, Joya enrolled in military academy at 14, but was expelled "when a teacher caught him cheating on an exam." He subsequently enlisted as a private and within two years had risen to become the youngest sergeant in the army. He joined the military police, and in 1981, along with a dozen other Hondurans, had 6 weeks' training in the US. He went on to become a member of Intelligence Battalion 3-16.

Billy Joya was one of at least 18 members of the death squad Intelligence Battalion 3-16 who trained at the School of the Americas in the United States.

Joya fled legal proceedings in Honduras regarding allegations of torture and forced disappearances carried out by Battalion 3-16, and sought political asylum in Spain, which was rejected. In August 1998 a claim was filed against Joya in Spain requesting his detention, asserting universal jurisdiction under the Convention Against Torture. "Joya voluntarily returned to Honduras in December 1998 after receiving promises of special treatment. He was jailed but freed in August 2000 after a judge said there was not enough evidence to continue his detention."

In 1996 Joya told the victims of Battalion 3-16, "I ask pardon for having contributed to that history of pain and suffering that you experienced."

== Security adviser ==
As of mid-2006, Billy Joya was a national security advisor to Alvaro Romero, another former Battalion 3-16 member, who was a government minister (Secretary of Security) during the presidency of Manuel Zelaya.
