= Napoleón Nassar Herrera =

Honduran military officer

Napoleón Nazar Herrera (pronounced: Nassar) is a Honduran military officer who worked in the controversial Battalion 3–16 and who successively became leader of the General Department of Criminal Investigation (DGIC), high Commissioner of Police for the north-west region in the Manuel Zelaya government, and one of the Secretary of Security's spokespeople in the de facto government of Roberto Micheletti.

== Civil career ==
As of late 2005, during the Ricardo Maduro presidency, Nazar was leader of the General Department of Criminal Investigation (DGIC). On 5 June 2005, agents from the DGIC put a community leader who had been stabbed and wounded on his face, neck, back, sides and hands by paramilitaries, Feliciano Pineda, into chains and imprisoned him in Gracias.

During the Manuel Zelaya presidency, Nazar was high Commissioner of Police for the north-west region.

In the government of Roberto Micheletti following the 2009 Honduran constitutional crisis, Nazar became one of the Secretary of Security's spokespeople for communicating with protestors ((in Spanish): uno de los designados por la Secretaría de Seguridad para el diálogo). Following police violence against thousands of demonstrators from the Copán and Santa Bárbara regions campaigning on 17 July 2009 for a new law about mineral resources, Nazar stated that for anyone who felt aggrieved, prosecutors and human rights exist.
