= Languages of Honduras =

- Official: Spanish
- Indigenous: Chʼortiʼ, Jicaquean, Lenca †, Mangue †, Misumalpan, Pech
- Minority: Garifuna
- Foreign: English

There are a number of languages spoken in Honduras though the official language is Spanish.

== Living Indigenous languages ==
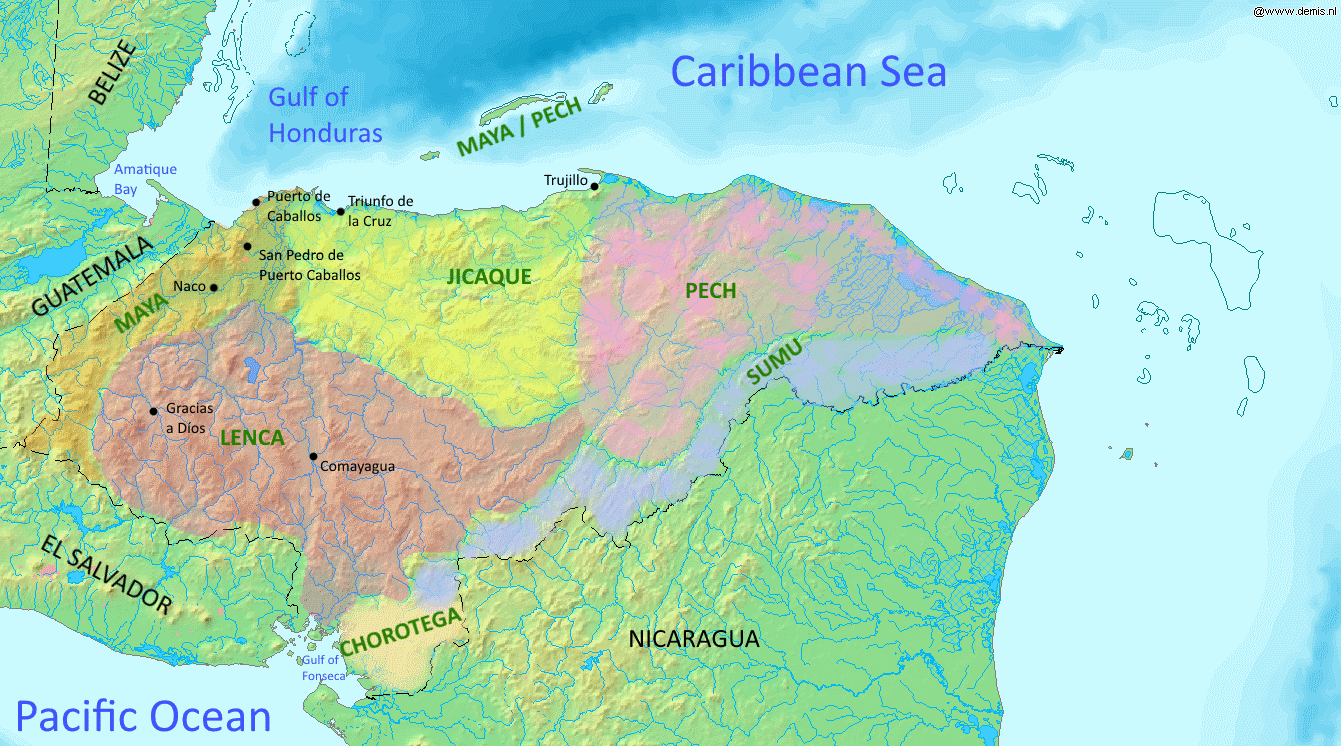
Map of Honduras's Indigenous Peoples.

In Honduras, dozens of languages were spoken before the Spanish conquest. The most widely spoken language in the region was Lenca; after the conquest, the most spoken language became Spanish.

=== Ch’orti’ language ===
The Chʼortiʼ people speak a Mayan language in the Ch'olan group.

=== Garifuna language ===
They are the result of the mixture of African slaves (that shipwrecked in two ships in 1655 and another one that shipwrecked in 1675) with the Caribbean Indians (Amerindians, who had diverse languages called Caribbean languages), thus originated the Black Caribs who dominated the Island of Saint Vincent and the Grenadines until 1797, when they were expelled by the English towards Roatán and Trujillo.

=== Miskito ===
The Miskitos are a mixed-race ethnic group with their own language, occupying part of the territory of Honduras and Nicaragua.

=== Pech language ===
They call themselves "Pech" which means "people," a term that is used to refer only to them; for the rest of the population they use the terms pech-akuá (the other people) or bulá that means ladino.

=== Tawahka or Sumo language ===
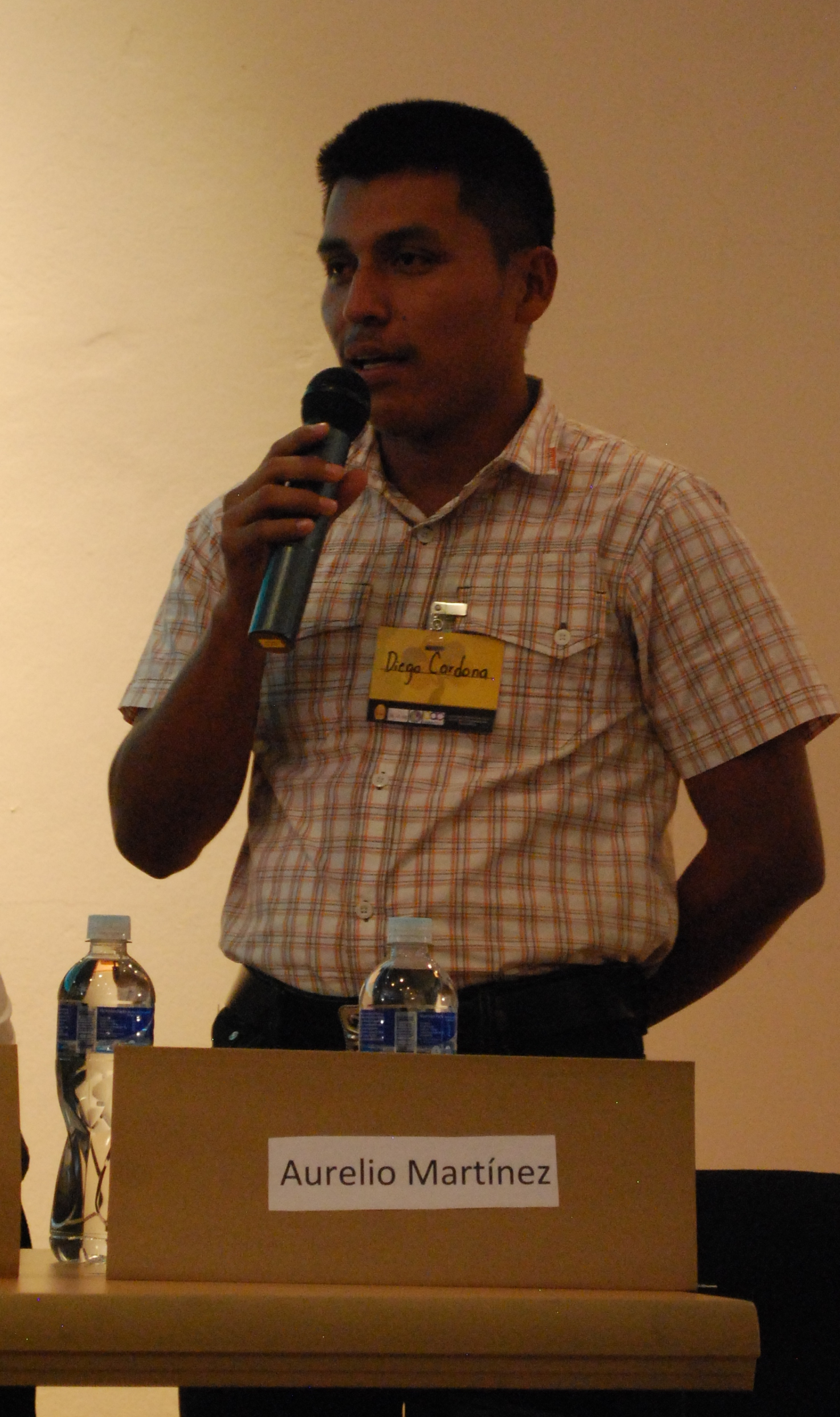
Diego Cardona represents the Tawahka in a congress in the National Autonomous University of Honduras

According to studies consulted, the Tawahka language and the Misquita are quite similar in their morphological and syntactic structure, although they do not have much lexicon in common. Both languages belong to the group macro-chibcha, linguistic group of South American origin. It is assumed that in very distant dates the ancestors of the Tawahkas, Misquitos and the branches (another related group), emigrated from what is now Colombia passing through the isthmus of Panama. The Tawahkas call their language Twanka, which shows a similarity to the name that, at the beginning of the seventeenth century, the Spaniards gave the Indians of the Guayape-Guayambre area: tahuajcas. The mother tongue of this town is Tawahka, but they also speak Miskito and Spanish, although they still have some difficulty speaking Spanish.

=== Tol language ===
Spoken by Tolupans in La Montaña de la Flor reservation in Francisco Morazán Department. Tol used to be spoken from the Río Ulúa in the west, to modern-day Trujillo in the east, and to the Río Sulaco in the inland south. Related to Jicaque.

== Extinct Indigenous languages ==
=== Jicaquean language ===
Was spoken around El Palmar, Cortés Department, near Chamelecón. Related to Tolupan.

=== Lenca ===
The language of the Honduran Lencas is considered an extinct language. Because it is already in danger of extinction, it has a population of 300 to 594 semi-speakers. Its geographical location is between the western departments of Honduras, as they are: Lempira, Intibucá, La Paz, also they are in smaller quantity in the central departments of Santa Barbara, Comayagua Department, Francisco Morazán Department and Valle.

=== Mangue language ===
The Mangue language, also known as Chorotega, consisted of several dialects spoken in the region of Gulf of Fonseca by Chorotega natives. Mangue is closely related to the Chiapanec language spoken in Mexico, and is classified as belonging to the Oto-Manguean language family.

=== Matagalpa language ===
It is an extinct language of the Misumalpan languages that was the main language of the central highlands of the republic of Nicaragua and of the department of El Paraíso in The Republic of Honduras.

In El Paraíso, it was called the language of the "Chatos" and "Sules" of that Honduran department.

== Spanish ==
By far, Spanish is the most widely spoken language in the country, spoken natively by the vast majority of citizens, regardless of ethnicity. Honduran Spanish is considered a variety of Central American Spanish.

== Other languages ==
=== Bay Islands English ===
The Bay Islands are composed of larger islands called Utila, Roatan and Guanaja and their smaller islands or islets called Morat, Barbareta, Santa Elena and Cayos Cochinos. They are located on the northern coast of Honduras.

Their language is Creole English. Imported from England and Ireland, when the pirates and corsairs possessed these lands, when they attacked the ships of the Spanish Empire.

== Classification ==
Hondurans, as mentioned, are usually classified into seven language families. Some of the languages are poorly documented, however, it seems that all languages documented in Honduras can be classified with reasonable certainty. Some of the languages are currently extinct (and here they are marked with the sign †). The table indicates the territories where the different languages are or were spoken, although in actuality the languages have disappeared from many of the indicated territories.

The classification of the languages of Honduras
Family	Group		Language	Territory
Indo-European languages Eurasian family to which the languages of European settlers belong.	Romance	Ibero-romance	Spanish language	Honduras (the whole country)
Indo-European languages Eurasian family to which the languages of European settlers belong.	Germanic	Criollo English	Bay Islands English	Bay Islands
Uto-Aztecan; Family originating from Aridoamerica, some of whose groups moved as far south as Nicaragua.	Nahuan languages		Pipil (Nawat)	Ocotepeque
Mayan languages Family originating from Mesoamerica.	Cholan-Tzeltalan	Ch’olan languages	Ch’orti’ (<10 speakers)	Copán
Oto-Manguean languages Family originating from Mesoamerica.	Tlapanec-Manguean	Manguean languages	Mangue †	Choluteca
Jicaquean languages Family that might have its origin probably in Mesoamerica and some of whose groups migrated further south.	-		Jicaque †	El Palmar
Jicaquean languages Family that might have its origin probably in Mesoamerica and some of whose groups migrated further south.	-		Tolupán	Montaña del Flor
Lencan languages Language family that encompasses languages of the intermediate area and the north of South America. Its origin is not clear.	-		Honduran Lenca †	Valle, Comayagua, Intibucá, La Paz, Morazán
Misumalpan languages Language family spoken by indigenous peoples on the east coast of Nicaragua and nearby areas.	Sumalpan	Sumo	Mayanga	Olancho, Gracias a Dios
Misumalpan languages Language family spoken by indigenous peoples on the east coast of Nicaragua and nearby areas.	Sumalpan	Matagalpan	Matagalpa †	El Paraíso
Misumalpan languages Language family spoken by indigenous peoples on the east coast of Nicaragua and nearby areas.	Miskito		Miskito	Olancho, Gracias a Dios
Chibchan languages Language family indigenous to the Isthmo-Colombian Area, which extends from eastern Honduras to northern Colombia and includes populations of these countries as well as Nicaragua, Costa Rica, and Panama.	-		Pech	Colón, Olancho
Arawakan languages The Arawak languages are native to South America and their presence in Central America is due to the establishment of groups during the colonial period.	Caribbean Arawak	Iñeri	Garífuna	Cortés, Atlántida, Colón, Gracias a Dios
Village sign language	-		Bay Islands Sign Language	Bay Islands

== See also ==
- History of Honduras
- Cariban languages
- Languages of Belize
- Elections in Honduras
- National Congress of Honduras
- Classification of indigenous languages of the Americas
