= Recognition of same-sex unions in Honduras =

Honduras does not recognise same-sex marriage or civil unions. The Constitution of Honduras has explicitly banned same-sex marriage since 2005. In January 2022, the Supreme Court dismissed a legal challenge to the ban, but a request to review whether the ban violates the American Convention on Human Rights is pending with the Inter-American Commission on Human Rights. A same-sex marriage bill was introduced to the National Congress in May 2022.

== Legal history ==
=== Background ===
In 2005, the Constitution of Honduras was amended to expressly ban same-sex marriage and civil unions. This constitutional amendment further forbids same-sex marriages or unions legally contracted in other countries from being recognized in Honduras. It also prohibits same-sex couples from adopting. Article 112 reads: "The right of a man and a woman to contract marriage is recognized, as well as the legal equality of spouses. [...] Marriage and de facto unions between persons of the same sex are prohibited. Marriages and de facto unions between persons of the same sex celebrated or recognized under the laws of other countries shall not be valid in Honduras." (Note: Spanish: Se reconoce el derecho del hombre y de la mujer, que tengan la calidad de tales naturalmente, a contraer matrimonio entre sí, así como la igualdad jurídica de los cónyuges. [...] Se prohibe el matrimonio y la unión de hecho entre personas del mismo sexo. Los matrimonios o uniones de hecho entre personas del mismo sexo celebrados o reconocidos bajo las leyes de otros países no tendrán validez en Honduras.) In January 2021, the National Congress of Honduras passed a constitutional amendment that banned abortion under all circumstances and established that any future changes to the articles on abortion and marriage require approval by three-quarters of Congress rather than two-thirds. Human Rights Watch opposed the amendment, saying that it "contravene[s] constitutional and international obligations to protect and guarantee human rights."

Before the November 2017 elections, three candidates running in the Francisco Morazán Department for the National Party and the Christian Democratic Party announced their support for same-sex marriage, adding that they would be open to introducing a same-sex marriage bill to the National Congress. However, none of the three candidates won a seat in the National Congress. On 12 October 2018, President Juan Orlando Hernández told reporters at a press conference, "Personally as a Christian, I am against marriage of persons of the same sex; obviously, it is the judiciary that, according to Honduran law, has to rule on it. [Regardless of sexual preferences] people should be treated with dignity, no matter what their inclination. People should be treated with dignity and this issue is very important."

=== 2018 Inter-American Court of Human Rights advisory opinion ===
Homosexuality laws in Central America and the Caribbean Islands. Same-sex marriage Other type of partnership Unregistered cohabitation No recognition of same-sex couples Constitution limits marriage to opposite-sex couples Same-sex sexual activity illegal but law not enforced

On 9 January 2018, the Inter-American Court of Human Rights (IACHR) issued an advisory opinion that parties to the American Convention on Human Rights should grant same-sex couples "accession to all existing domestic legal systems of family registration, including marriage, along with all rights that derive from marriage". The advisory opinion states that:

The State must recognize and guarantee all rights derived from a family bond between persons of the same sex in accordance with the provisions of Articles 11.2 and 17.1 of the American Convention. (...) in accordance with articles 1.1, 2, 11.2, 17, and 24 of the American Convention, it is necessary to guarantee access to all the existing figures in domestic legal systems, including the right to marry. (..) To ensure the protection of all the rights of families formed by same-sex couples, without discrimination with respect to those that are constituted by heterosexual couples.

Honduras ratified the American Convention on Human Rights on 8 September 1977 and recognized the court's jurisdiction on 9 September 1981. In May 2018, a group of LGBT activists from the Center for LGBTI Development and Cooperation (Somos CDC; Centro para el Desarrollo y la Cooperación LGBTI) filed a lawsuit with the Supreme Court of Honduras to legalise same-sex marriage and recognize marriages validly performed in other countries. A second case was filed shortly thereafter, but was dismissed on technical grounds in November 2018. In February 2019, it was reported that the Supreme Court was expected to rule on the case within "the next few days", but it was announced in May 2019 that they were "expected to rule later [that] year". The court ruled in January 2022 that same-sex marriages violate the Constitution of Honduras and the Family Code, and dismissed the case. In September 2022, plaintiffs asked the Inter-American Commission on Human Rights to review Honduras' same-sex marriage ban.

=== Legislative action ===
In May 2022, José Rodríguez Rosales, a deputy from the governing Liberty and Refoundation party, introduced a same-sex marriage bill to the National Congress. The bill was quickly opposed by religious organizations. The president of the Tegucigalpa Pastors' Association, Gerardo Irías, called the bill an "aberration in God's eyes" and urged President Xiomara Castro to oppose "immoral laws". In December 2022, the Minister of Human Rights, Natalie Roque Sandoval, said that the legalization of same-sex marriage was "not on the [government's] agenda".

== Native Hondurans ==
While many Indigenous cultures historically practiced polygamy to some extent, there are no records of same-sex marriages being performed in these cultures in the way they are commonly defined in Western legal systems. Unlike Canada and the United States, there is no strong evidence for the existence of two-spirit individuals or identities and behaviours that may be placed on the LGBT spectrum in these communities, as many of these cultures are poorly documented in both colonial sources and modern ethnography. Indigenous people have deep-rooted marriage traditions, placing a strong emphasis on community, family and spiritual connections. Among the Tolupan, marriage (tjawaya) was primarily monogamous, with a variation of patrilocality as the typical household residential pattern. Concubinage (ʼamyula) was also recognized as an institutionalized practice. Chʼortiʼ marriages (nujb’ya’r) were typically arranged, patrilocal and monogamous—though elites often practiced polygyny. Garifuna men of high rank were also polygynous. Marriage patterns were typically matrilocal and matrilineal, though formal marriage (Garifuna: mariei) historically was not always the central unit of family life; long-term partnerships and visiting relationships (similar to Caribbean "visiting unions") were common.

== Religious performance ==
The Catholic Church opposes same-sex marriage and does not allow its priests to officiate at such marriages. In December 2023, the Holy See published Fiducia supplicans, a declaration allowing Catholic priests to bless couples who are not considered to be married according to church teaching, including the blessing of same-sex couples. Cardinal Óscar Rodríguez Maradiaga, who had previously served as archbishop of Tegucigalpa, responded that the declaration was "not heresy", but "a pastoral explanation on the nature of the blessings" and "serves as an instrument of merciful love". The Church along with various Protestant groups were staunch supporters of the constitutional amendment to ban same-sex marriage in 2005. At the time, one Evangelical pastor justified the amendment by calling LGBT people "like alcoholic[s], like addict[s] that need help. They are sick morally and have a sickness of the soul." In May 2023, Evangelical groups organized a march in Tegucigalpa opposing same-sex unions and demanding respect for "God's design for the family".

== Public opinion ==
According to a Pew Research Center survey conducted between 9 November and 19 December 2013, 13% of Hondurans supported same-sex marriage, while 83% were opposed. According to the 2017 AmericasBarometer, 19% of Hondurans supported same-sex marriage. A 2018 CID Gallup poll found that 75% of Hondurans opposed same-sex marriage, while 17% were in favor and the remaining did not know or refused to answer.

== See also ==
- LGBT rights in Honduras
- Recognition of same-sex unions in the Americas
- San Pedro Sula Pride
