= Jicaque =

Jicaque may refer to:

- The Jicaque people
- One of the Jicaquean languages, especially
  - the Jicaque language
