= Demographics of Honduras =

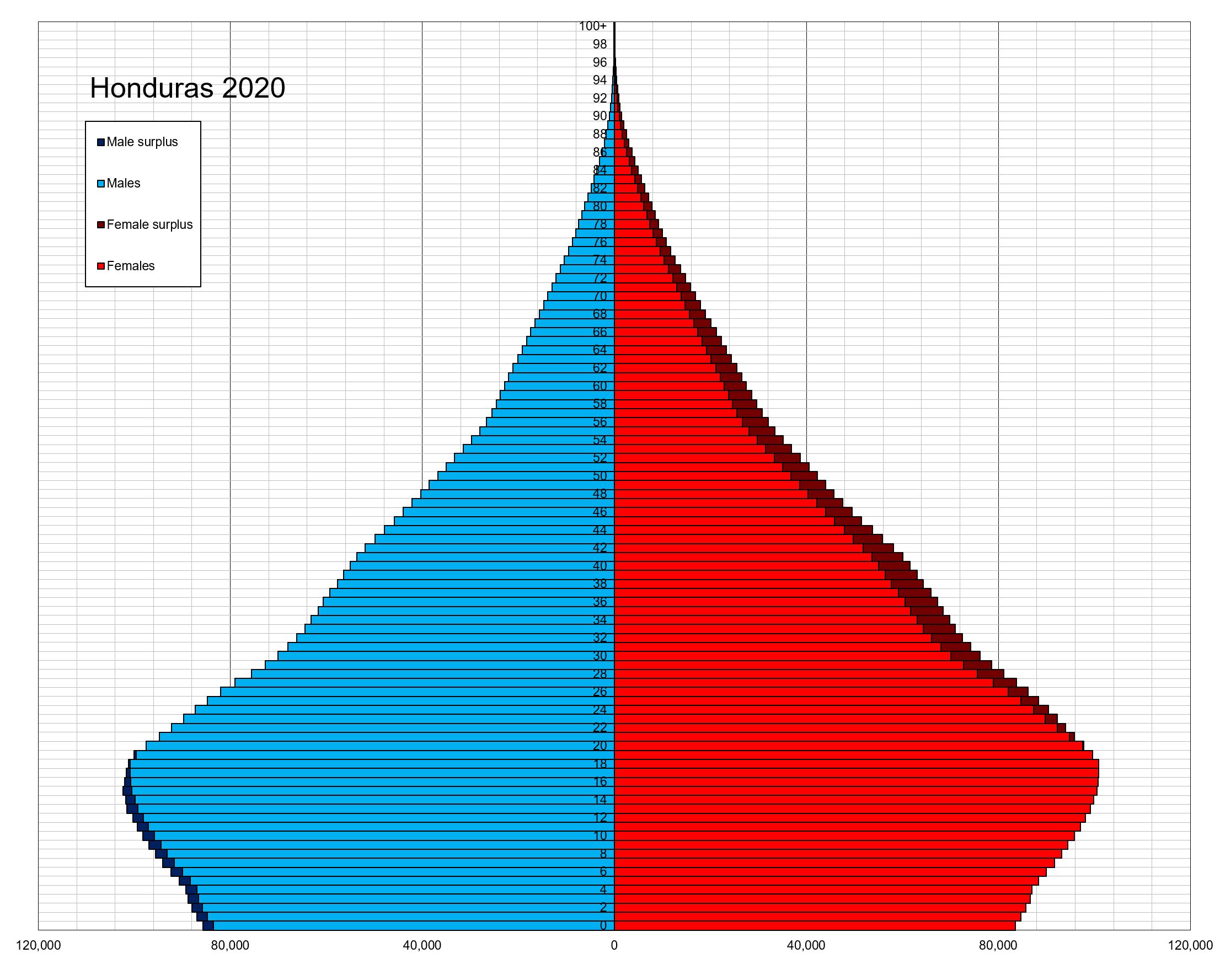
- Population pyramid of Honduras in 2020
- Population: 9,459,440 (2022 est.)
- Growth rate: 1.19% (2022 est.)
- Birth rate: 17.92 births/1,000 population (2022 est.)
- Death rate: 4.68 deaths/1,000 population (2022 est.)
- Life expectancy: 75.17 years
  - male: 71.63 years
  - female: 78.82 years
- Fertility rate: 2.01 children born/woman (2022 est.)
- Infant mortality: 15.08 deaths/1,000 live births
- Net migration rate: −1.34 migrant(s)/1,000 population (2022 est.)

Age structure
- 0–14 years: 30.90%
- 15–64 years: 63.20%
- 65 and over: 5.90%

Sex ratio
- Total: 0.95 male(s)/female (2022 est.)
- At birth: 1.03 male(s)/female
- Under 15: 1.03 male(s)/female
- 65 and over: 0.71 male(s)/female

Nationality
- Nationality: Honduran
- Major ethnic: Multiracial (82.93%)
- Minor ethnic: Whites (7.87%); Indigenous (7.25%); Lencas (5.46%); Miskitos (0.96%); Chʼortiʼ (0.40%); Others (0.43%); Blacks (1.39%); Other groups (0.55%)

Language
- Official: Spanish
- Spoken: Languages of Honduras

This article is about the ethnic groups and population of Honduras.

== Population size and structure ==
Census population and average annual growth rate
Year	Pop.	±%
1791	96,421	—
1801	128,453	+33.2%
1881	307,289	+139.2%
1887	331,917	+8.0%
1895	398,877	+20.2%
1901	543,741	+36.3%
1905	500,136	−8.0%
1910	553,446	+10.7%
1916	605,997	+9.5%
1926	700,811	+15.6%
1930	854,184	+21.9%
1935	962,000	+12.6%
1940	1,107,859	+15.2%
1945	1,200,542	+8.4%
1950	1,368,605	+14.0%
1961	1,884,765	+37.7%
1974	2,656,948	+41.0%
1988	4,614,377	+73.7%
2001	6,535,344	+41.6%
2013	8,303,771	+27.1%
Source: INE

According to the 2022 revision of the World Population Prospects the total population was 10,278,345 in 2021, compared to 1,487,000 in 1950 (a fivefold increase in 60 years). The proportion of the population aged below 15 in 2010 was 36.8%, 58.9% were aged between 15 and 65 years of age, and 4.3% were aged 65 years or older.

As of 2014, 60% of Hondurans live below the poverty line. More than 30% of the population is divided between the lower middle and upper middle class, less than 10% are wealthy or belong to the higher social class (most live in Tegucigalpa and San Pedro Sula).

Year	Total population ( × 1000)	Proportion percentage		
Year	Total population ( × 1000)	aged 0–14	aged 15–64	aged 65+
1950	1 487	42.2%	53.8%	4.0%
1955	1 717	44.3%	52.3%	3.4%
1960	2 002	46.1%	50.8%	3.2%
1965	2 353	47.1%	49.8%	3.1%
1970	2 691	47.7%	49.2%	3.1%
1975	3 108	47.5%	49.3%	3.2%
1980	3 636	47.0%	49.8%	3.2%
1985	4 238	46.2%	50.6%	3.2%
1990	4 904	45.5%	51.1%	3.4%
1995	5 592	44.3%	52.1%	3.6%
2000	6 575	42.8%	53.5%	3.7%
2005	7 459	40.6%	55.6%	3.8%
2010	8 317	37.6%	58.4%	4.0%
2015	9 113	33.7%	61.9%	4.3%
2020	9 905	30.6%	64.4%	5.0%

=== Structure of the population ===
Population Estimates by Sex and Age Group (01.VII.2007) (Data refer to projections based on the 2001 Population Census.):

Age group	Male	Female	Total	%
Total	3 717 577	3 819 375	7 536 952	100
0–4	541 070	522 177	1 063 247	14.11
5–9	511 733	497 666	1 009 399	13.39
10–14	464 403	456 447	920 850	12.22
15–19	402 792	400 001	802 793	10.65
20–24	353 317	357 434	710 751	9.43
25–29	308 283	318 130	626 413	8.31
30–34	255 818	266 861	522 679	6.93
35–39	205 171	219 874	425 045	5.64
40–44	157 492	177 140	334 632	4.44
45–49	128 813	147 464	276 277	3.67
50–54	105 428	121 993	227 421	3.02
55–59	83 643	97 033	180 676	2.40
60–64	63 863	73 789	137 652	1.83
65–69	49 404	58 136	107 540	1.43
70–74	37 134	44 984	82 118	1.09
75–79	24 368	30 225	54 593	0.72
80+	24 845	30 021	54 866	0.73
Age group	Male	Female	Total	Percent
0–14	1 517 206	1 476 290	2 993 496	39.72
15–64	2 064 620	2 179 719	4 244 339	56.31
65+	135 751	163 366	299 117	3.97

Population Estimates by Sex and Age Group (01.VII.2010) (Data refer to projections based on the 2001 Population Census.):

Age group	Male	Female	Total	%
Total	3 965 430	4 080 560	8 045 990	100
0–4	549 179	530 110	1 079 289	13.41
5–9	525 938	509 139	1 035 077	12.86
10–14	492 090	481 523	973 613	12.10
15–19	434 856	431 337	866 193	10.77
20–24	371 818	375 696	747 514	9.29
25–29	326 377	337 526	663 903	8.25
30–34	282 042	295 519	577 561	7.18
35–39	230 506	244 378	474 884	5.90
40–44	181 554	200 161	381 715	4.74
45–49	140 031	161 534	301 565	3.75
50–54	116 240	135 378	251 618	3.13
55–59	93 205	109 982	203 187	2.53
60–64	72 071	85 246	157 317	1.96
65–69	53 835	63 955	117 790	1.46
70–74	40 470	49 655	90 125	1.12
75–79	27 381	34 757	62 138	0.77
80+	27 837	34 664	62 501	0.78
Age group	Male	Female	Total	Percent
0–14	1 567 207	1 520 772	3 087 979	38.38
15–64	2 248 700	2 376 757	4 625 457	57.49
65+	149 523	183 031	332 554	4.13

Population by Sex and Age Group (Census 10.VIII.2013):

Age group	Male	Female	Total	%
Total	4 052 316	4 251 456	8 303 771	100
0–4	494 034	476 980	971 015	11.69
5–9	489 821	468 723	958 543	11.54
10–14	520 842	499 564	1 020 406	12.29
15–19	487 949	494 215	982 164	11.83
20–24	398 093	442 708	840 800	10.13
25–29	303 379	353 065	656 443	7.91
30–34	262 951	304 416	567 367	6.83
35–39	224 965	259 775	484 740	5.84
40–44	190 323	209 232	399 555	4.81
45–49	150 635	167 391	318 026	3.83
50–54	141 174	152 082	293 256	3.53
55–59	101 062	109 646	210 708	2.54
60–64	91 291	98 345	189 636	2.28
65–69	64 441	71 267	135 709	1.63
70–74	51 803	54 762	106 566	1.28
75–79	38 419	39 988	78 407	0.94
80–84	22 977	25 988	48 965	0.59
85–89	13 681	15 851	29 532	0.36
90–94	3 162	5 079	8 241	0.10
95+	1 313	2 379	3 692	0.04
Age group	Male	Female	Total	Percent
0–14	1 504 697	1 445 267	2 949 964	35.53
15–64	2 351 823	2 590 875	4 942 698	59.52
65+	195 796	215 314	411 110	4.95

Population Estimates by Sex and Age Group (01.VII.2021) (Projections based on the 2013 Population Census.):

Age group	Male	Female	Total	%
Total	4 599 323	4 851 388	9 450 711	100
0–4	499 399	481 326	980 725	10.38
5–9	487 201	470 343	957 544	10.13
10–14	498 226	483 892	982 118	10.39
15–19	479 112	485 063	964 175	10.20
20–24	439 748	465 939	905 687	9.58
25–29	403 089	436 407	839 496	8.88
30–34	361 467	397 429	758 896	8.03
35–39	304 818	339 274	644 092	6.82
40–44	246 965	278 001	524 966	5.55
45–49	205 536	232 492	438 028	4.63
50–54	168 437	191 093	359 530	3.80
55–59	139 061	157 969	297 030	3.14
60–64	112 471	128 236	240 707	2.55
65–69	88 488	102 590	191 078	2.02
70–74	65 693	77 874	143 567	1.52
75–79	45 441	54 983	100 424	1.06
80–84	28 378	35 119	63 497	0.67
85–89	15 164	19 214	34 378	0.36
90–94	7 624	9 864	17 488	0.19
95+	3 005	4 280	7 285	0.08
Age group	Male	Female	Total	Percent
0–14	1 484 826	1 435 561	2 920 387	30.90
15–64	2 860 704	3 111 903	5 972 607	63.20
65+	253 793	303 924	557 717	5.90

== Vital statistics ==
=== UN estimates ===
Registration of vital events is in Honduras not complete. The Population Department of the United Nations prepared the following estimates.

Period	Live births per year	Deaths per year	Natural change per year	CBR*	CDR*	NC*	TFR*	IMR*	Life expectancy		
Period	Live births per year	Deaths per year	Natural change per year	CBR*	CDR*	NC*	TFR*	IMR*	total	for males	for females
1950–1955	84 000	40 000	44 000	52.1	24.7	27.4	7.50	169	41.8	40.5	43.1
1955–1960	95 000	40 000	55 000	51.1	21.5	29.6	7.50	154	44.6	43.0	46.3
1960–1965	108 000	40 000	68 000	49.5	18.3	31.2	7.42	136	48.0	46.3	49.8
1965–1970	122 000	40 000	82 000	48.4	16.0	32.4	7.42	119	51.0	49.2	53.0
1970–1975	133 000	40 000	93 000	45.9	13.7	32.2	7.05	104	54.1	52.1	56.2
1975–1980	150 000	38 000	112 000	44.5	11.4	33.1	6.60	81	57.7	55.6	59.9
1980–1985	166 000	36 000	130 000	42.3	9.2	33.1	6.00	65	61.6	59.4	63.8
1985–1990	180 000	33 000	147 000	39.5	7.3	32.2	5.37	53	65.4	63.2	67.7
1990–1995	195 000	33 000	162 000	37.1	6.3	30.8	4.92	43	67.7	65.4	70.1
1995–2000	198 000	33 000	165 000	33.4	5.5	27.9	4.30	35	69.8	67.5	72.3
2000–2005	197 000	35 000	163 000	31.4	5.0	26.4	3.87	31	71.0	68.6	73.4
2005–2010	201 000	37 000	164 000	27.1	4.7	22.4	3.24	28	72.1	69.7	74.5
2010–2015				23.4	4.5	18.9	2.73				
2015–2020				21.8	4.4	17.4	2.49				
2020–2025				20.3	4.5	15.8	2.32				
2025–2030				18.6	4.6	14.0	2.19				
* CBR = crude birth rate (per 1000); CDR = crude death rate (per 1000); NC = natural change (per 1000); IMR = infant mortality rate per 1000 births; TFR = total fertility rate (number of children per woman)

=== Births and deaths ===
Year	Population	Live births	Deaths	Natural increase	Crude birth rate	Crude death rate	Rate of natural increase	TFR
1965	2,303,921	99,871			43.3			
1970	2,639,027	107,121			40.6			
1975	3,093,299	129,599			41.9			
1980	3,691,027	155,908			42.2			
1985	4,327,487	154,786			35.8			
1990	4,744,540	191,974			40.5			
1996	5,608,275	196,897			35.1			
2000	6,194,926	214,511			34.6			
2001	6,530,331	216,422			33.1			
2002	6,694,761	193,884			29.0			
2003	6,860,842	191,794			28.0			
2004	7,028,389	191,012			27.2			
2005	7,197,303	207,833			28.9			
2006	7,367,021	194,743			26.4			
2007	7,536,952	167,238			22.2			
2008	7,706,907	191,136			24.8			
2009	7,876,662	190,911			24.2			
2010	8,045,990	200,293	22,843	177,450	24.9	2.8	22.1	
2011	8,215,313	201,494	25,012	176,482	24.5	3.0	21.5	
2012	8,385,072	196,119	25,249	170,870	23.4	3.0	20.4	3.2
2013	8,303,770	181,244			21.8			2.7
2014	8,432,153	200,170			23.7			2.7
2015	8,576,532	204,753			23.9			2.6
2016	8,721,014	184,954			21.2			2.6
2017	8,859,980	182,581			20.6			2.5
2018	9,012,229	181,165			20.1			2.5
2019	9,158,345	169,171			18.5			2.5
2020	9,304,380	115,622			12.4			2.4
2021	9,450,711	165,684			17.5			
2022	9,597,739	157,896			16.5			1.8406
2023	9,745,149	146,669			15.1			
2024	9,892,632	132,284			13.4			
2025								
2026								

View source data.
View source data.

=== Demographic and health surveys ===
Total Fertility Rate (TFR) (Wanted Fertility Rate) and Crude Birth Rate (CBR):

Year	Total		Urban		Rural	
Year	CBR	TFR	CBR	TFR	CBR	TFR
1998–2001		4.4				
2005–2006	27	3,3 (2,3)	24	2,6 (1,9)	29	4,1 (2,8)
2011–2012	25.6	2,9 (2,2)	24.2	2,5 (1,9)	27.2	3,5 (2,6)

== Ethnic groups ==
Racial groups in Honduras (2013 census)
1. Mestizos (82.9%)
2. Whites (7.87%)
3. Indigenous (7.25%)
4. Blacks (1.39%)
5. Others (0.24%)

=== Amerindian ===
The Amerindian population is the largest minority group in Honduras. The largest Amerindian group are the Lencan people. These people have been living in Honduran territory since before the colonization of the Americas, developing their own societies and civilizations. They still have many communities across the country. The indigenous population would begin to decline from the mid-16th century, mainly due to the various diseases brought by the Europeans in addition to the growing mestizo population after the founding of towns and cities. According to the 2001 census the Amerindian population in Honduras included 381,495 people (6.3% of the total population). With the exception of the Lenca and the Ch'orti' they still keep their language.

Six different Amerindian groups were counted at the 2001 census:

- the Lenca (279,507 in 2001;4.6% of the total population) living in the La Paz, Intibucá, and Lempira departments;
- the Miskito (51,607 in 2001; 0.8%) living on the northeast coast along the border with Nicaragua.
- the Ch'orti' (34,453 in 2001;0.6% of the total population), a Mayan group living in the northwest on the border with Guatemala;
- the Tolupan (also called Jicaque, "Xicaque", or Tol; 9,617 in 2001; 0.2% of the total population), living in the reserve of the Montaña de la Flor and parts of the department of Yoro;
- the Pech or Paya Indians (3,848 in 2001; 0.1% of the total population) living in a small area in the Olancho department;
- the Mayangna or Tawahka (2,463 in 2001; <0.1%)

Examples of Honduran natives are the many Mayan rules of Copan and other Mayan cities, native chiefs such as Lempira and Cicumba, and environmental and feminist activist Berta Cáceres.

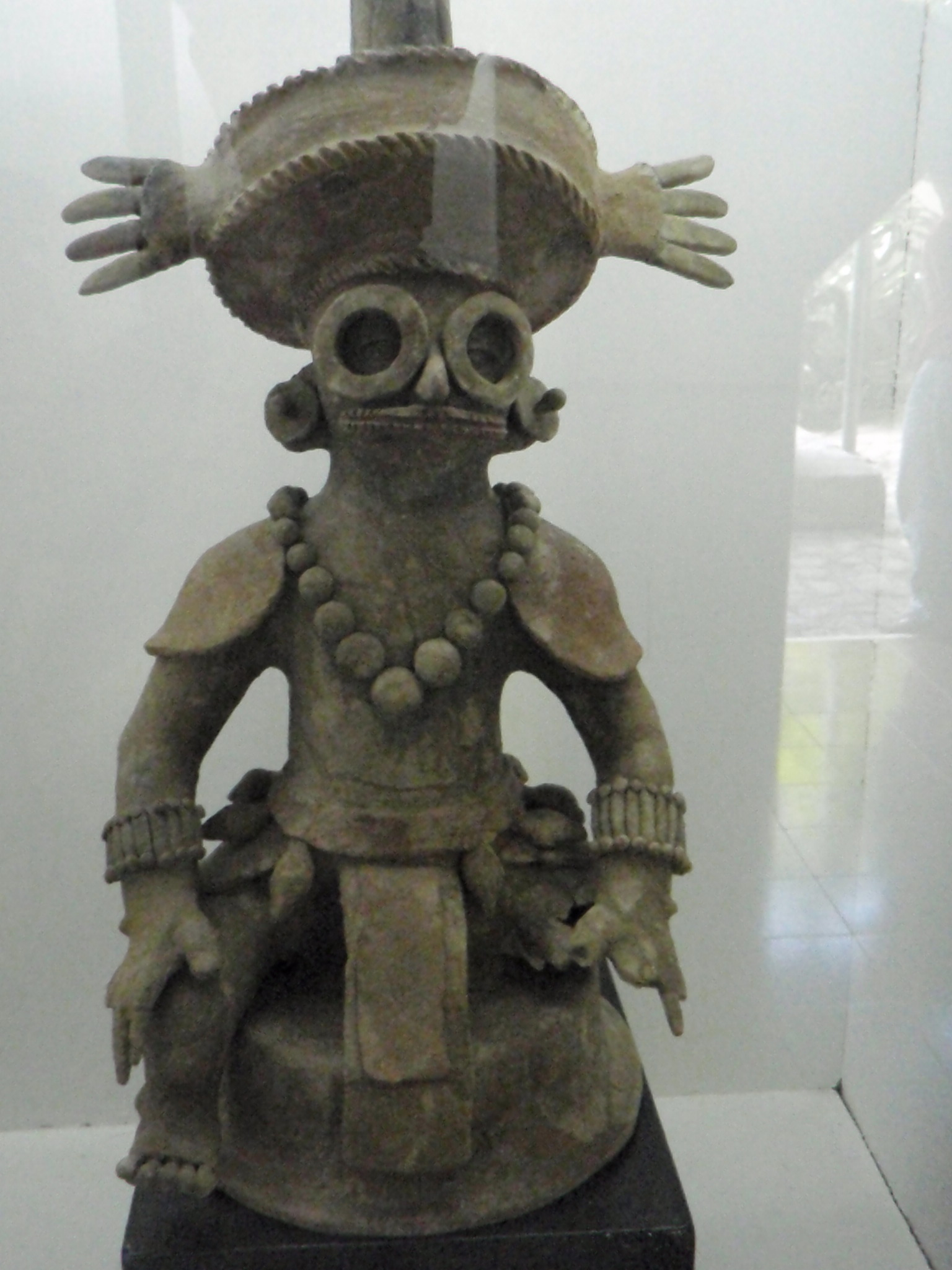
Copan founder, king Knich Yax Kuk Moo

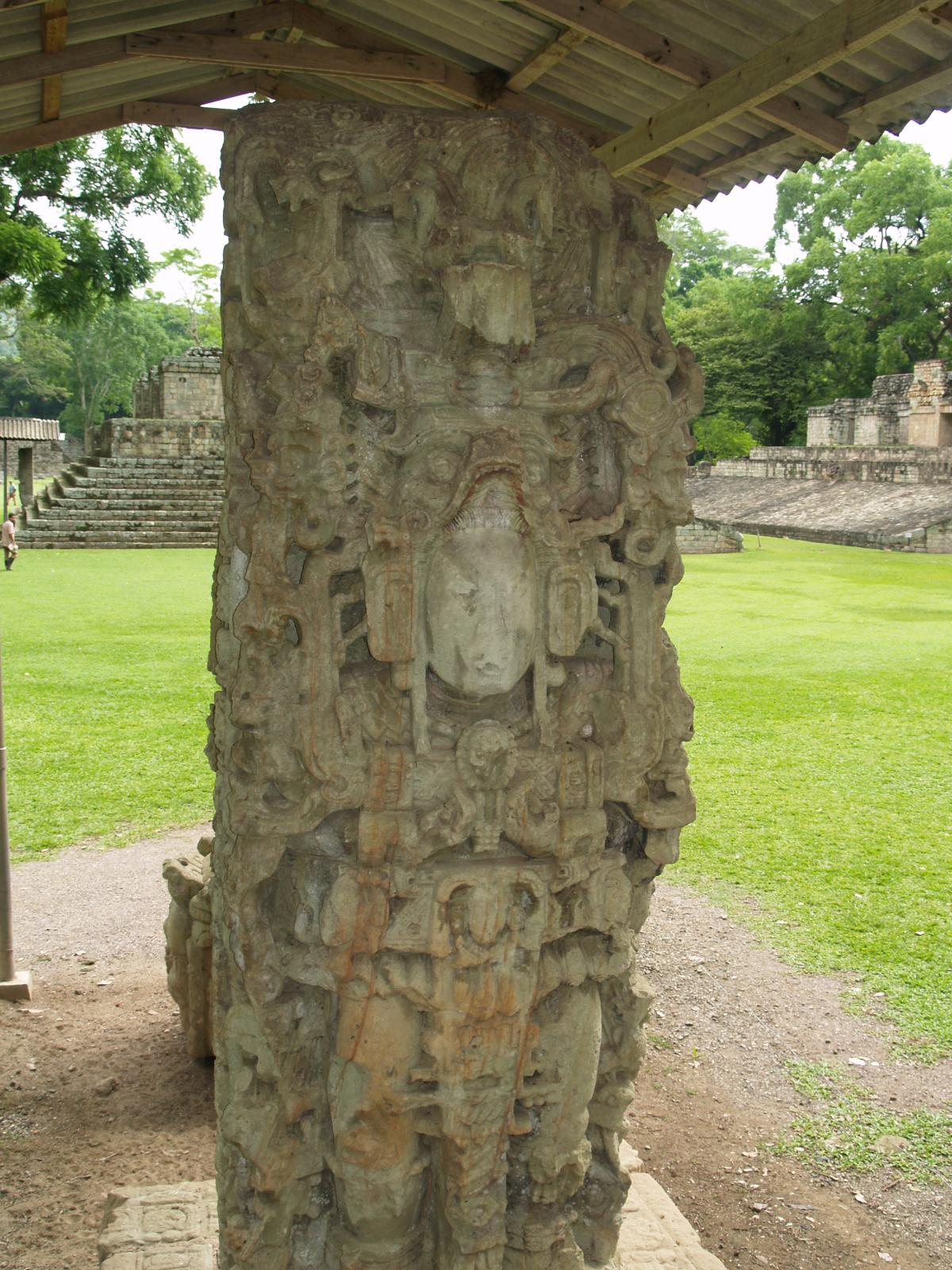
Mayan ruler, Kʼakʼ Yipyaj Chan Kʼawiil

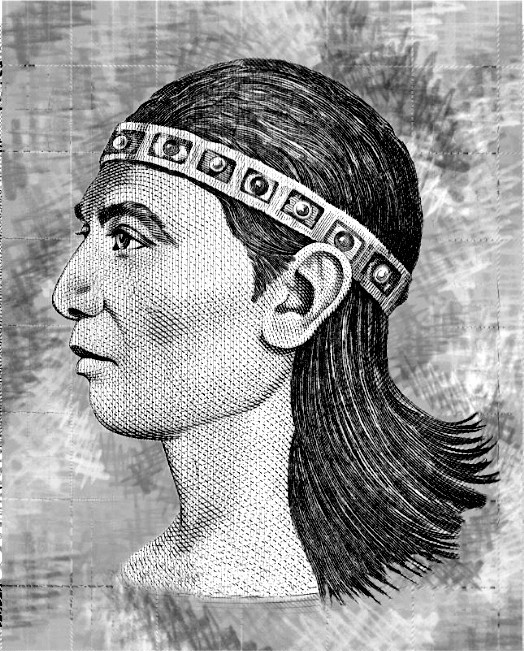
Lencan ruler, Lempira

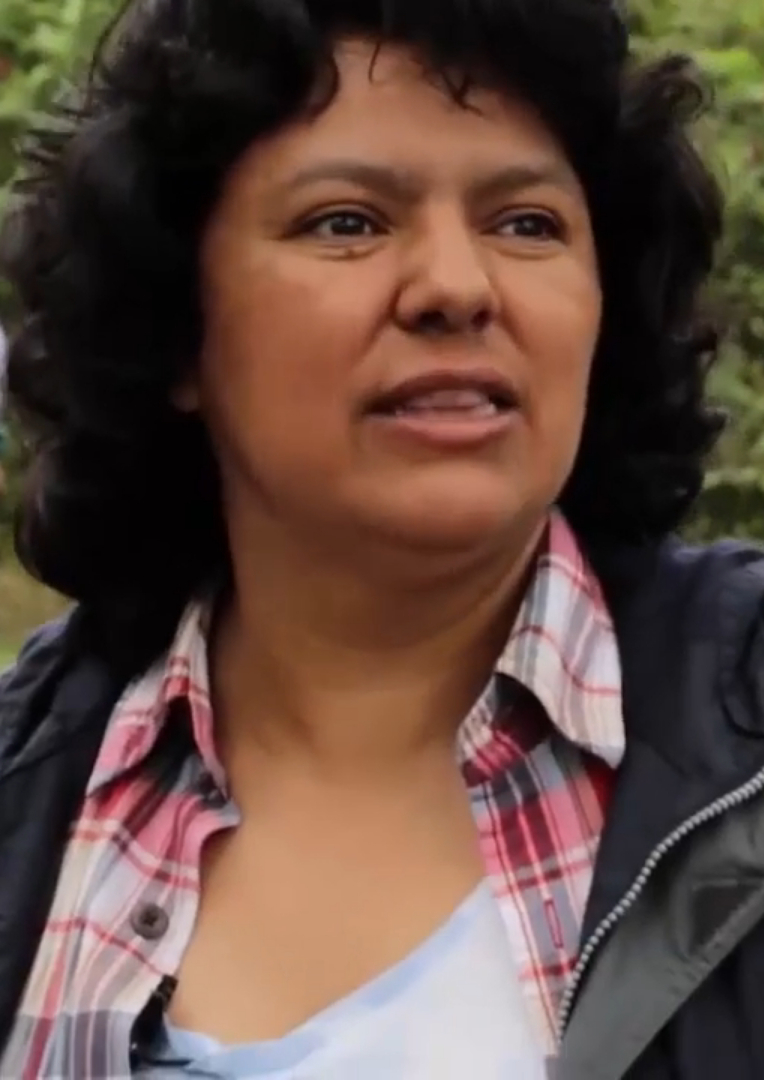
Lencan environmental activist, Berta Cáceres

=== Mestizos ===
Mestizos (meaning mixed European and Amerindian) have been reported by the CIA World Factbook to be about 87% of the population of Honduras. As in other Latin American countries, the question of racial breakdown of a national population is contentious. Since the beginning of the 20th century at least, Honduras has publicly framed itself as a mestizo nation, along with other Latin American countries such as Guatemala or Mexico, ignoring and at times disparaging both the European component of the population and the surviving Amerindian population that was still regarded as "pure blooded". It's well known that many Hondurans of European or almost entirely Amerindian background consider themselves mestizo.

Because of social stigmas attached, many Honduran people denied having African ancestry, and after African descended Caribbean workers arrived in Honduras, an active campaign to denigrate all people of African descent, made persons of mixed race anxious to deny any African ancestry. Hence official statistics quite uniformly under-represent those people who have ancestry in favor of a "two race" solution.

A genetic admixture study focusing on kidney disease in Hispanic populations in the United States found an average genetic mix of 40% European, 39% Indigenous, and 21% African ancestry in the Honduran-American diaspora population, from a sample of 295 US residents who reported all four grandparents born in Honduras. Another genetic study, found that the genetic mix of the majority of Honduran mestizos is 58.4% European, 36.2% Native American, and 5.4% African.

Examples of Honduran mestizos are, Poet Clementina Suarez, novelist and poet Roberto Sosa, footballer Noel Valladares and former president Manuel Zelaya.

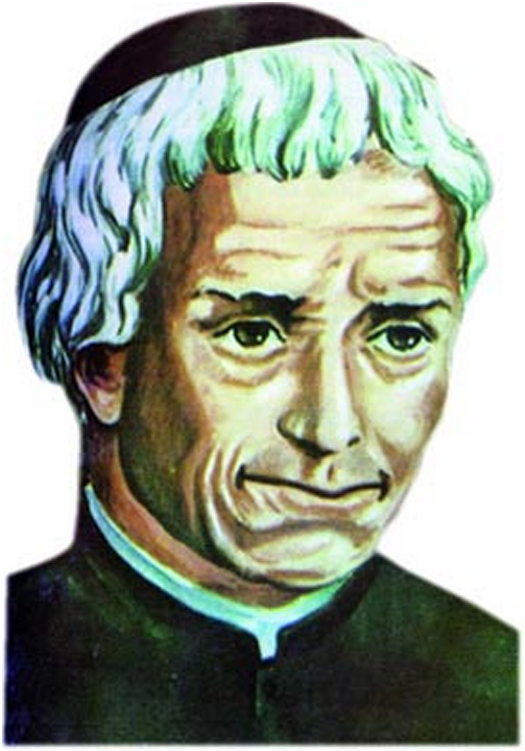
Father Jose Trinidad Reyes, Founder of the National University

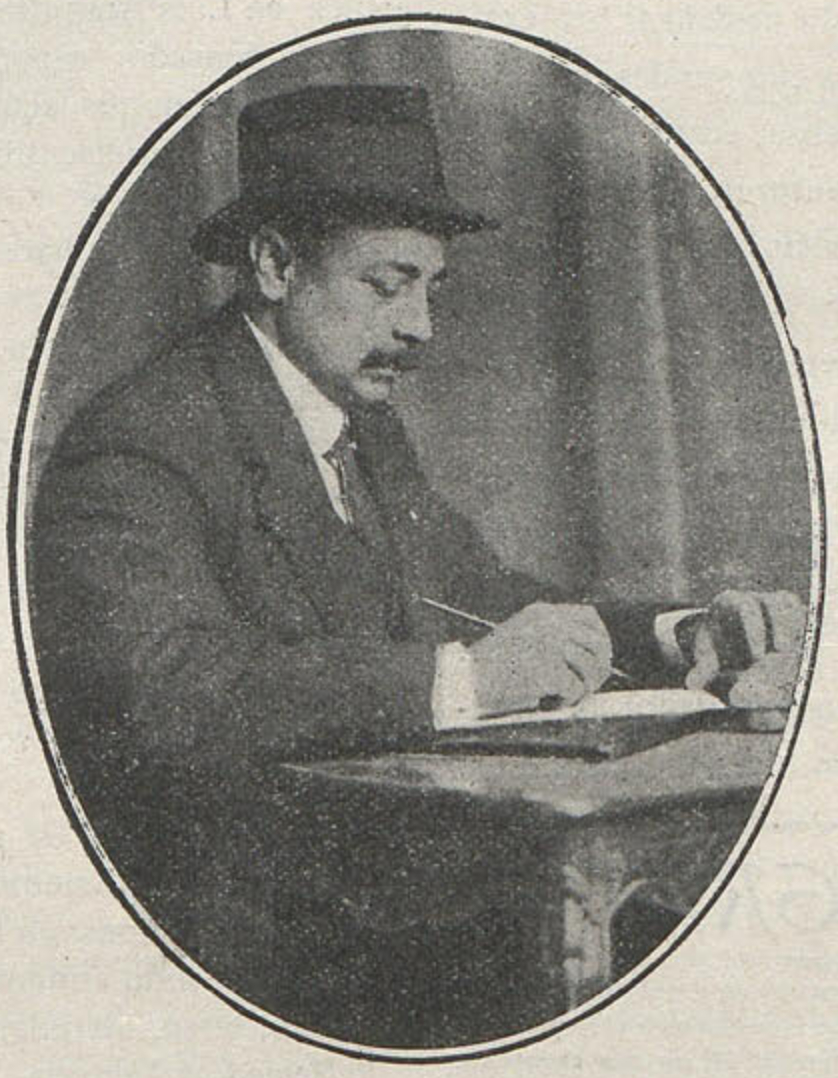
Poet and diplomat, Froylán Turcios

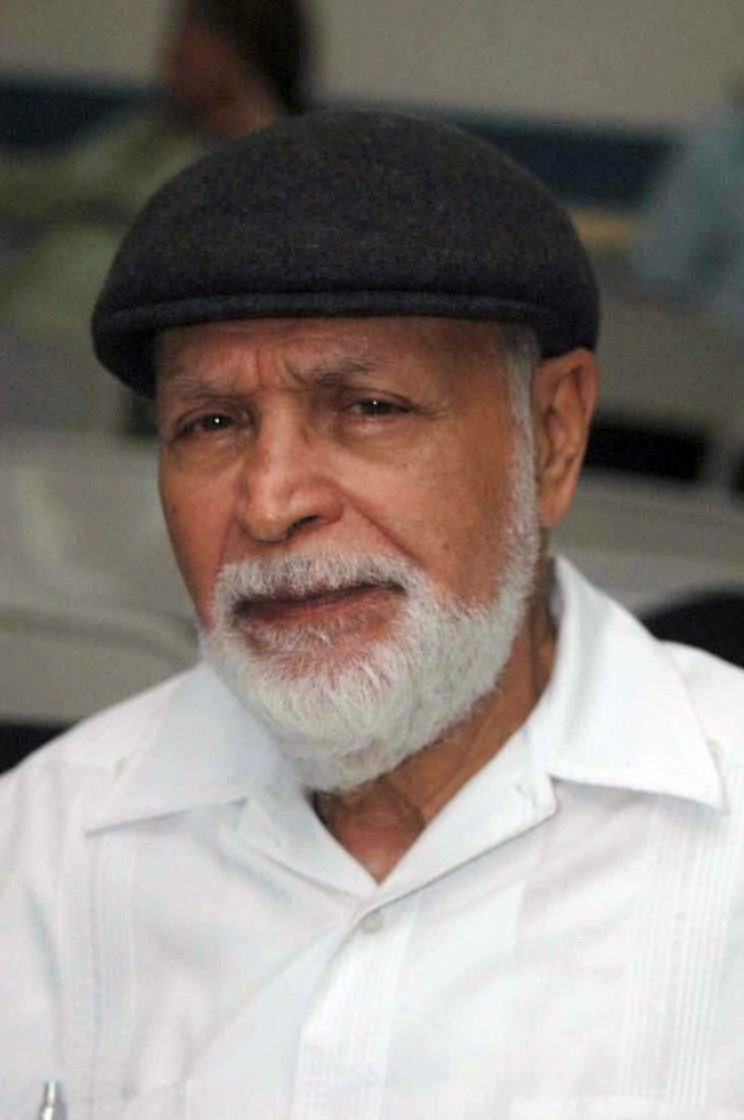
Novelist, Roberto Sosa

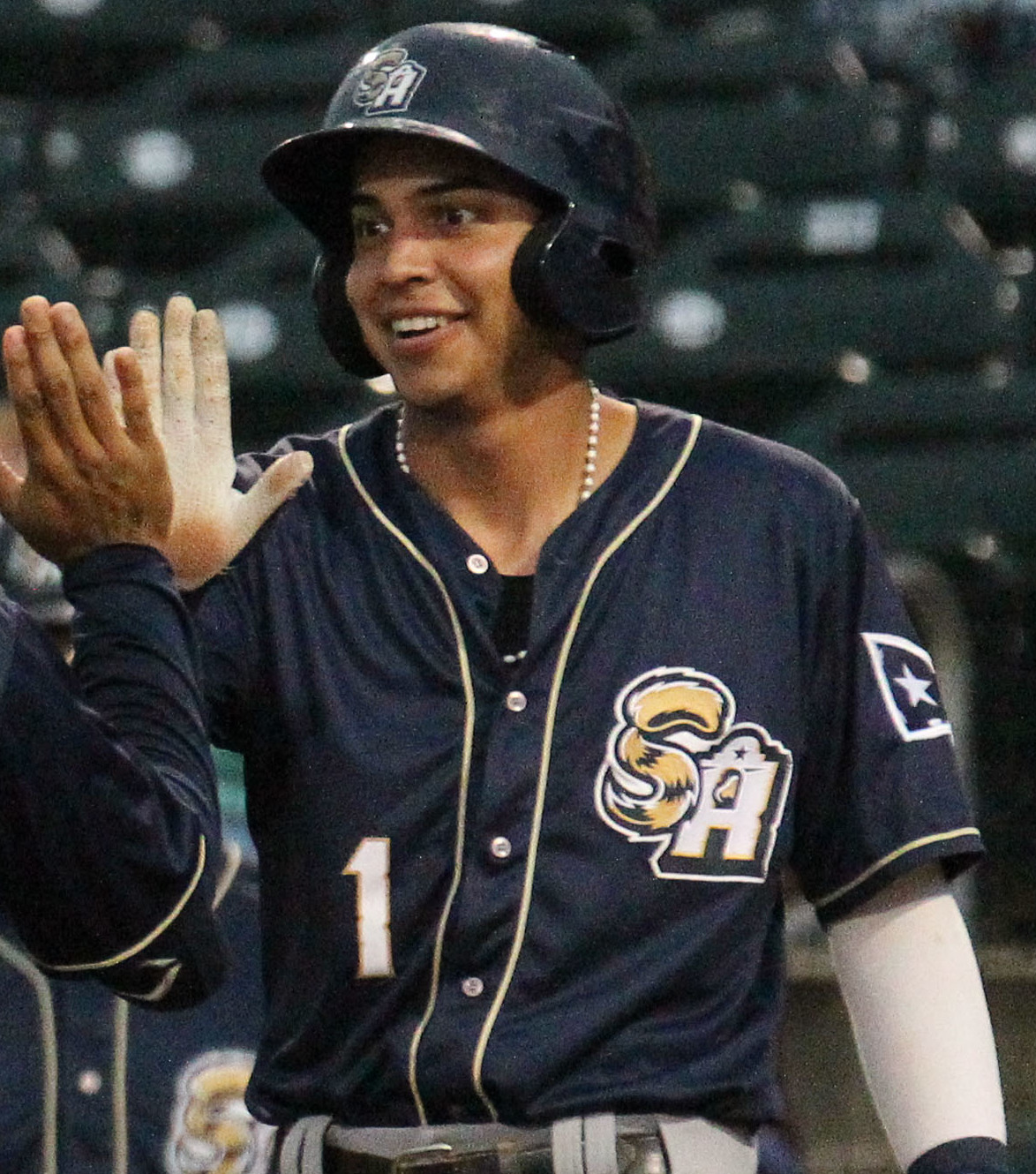
Baseballer, Mauricio Dubón

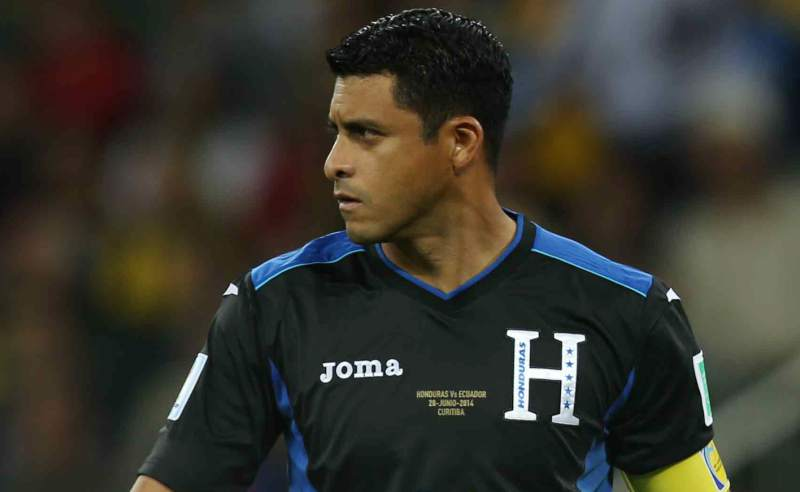
Footballer, Noél Valladares

=== African ===
The Afro-Honduran population consist of people of Afro-Descendants with roots in colonial Honduras, Garifuna, Miskito, and Creoles. Most of them are descendants of African people brought by the Spanish and other European colonizers between the 16th and 18th centuries. Many of them came from the west African coast, from places like Angola or Senegambia, where European bought slaves for their colonies, while others came from the other colonies in the Caribbean.

According to some reports around 230,000 enslaved Africans arrived to Honduras during colonial times, directly from Africa and other colonies in the Americas.

Scholars and private universities claim ranges from 20-30% of the Honduran population being Afro-descendants due to many Black Hondurans or Afro-descendants, Mulattos, Afro-Indigenous and people with significant African descent identifying as Mestizo due to oppression from society and the government and Mestizaje, wide-spread mixing amongst other things.

- The Miskito are an Afro-indigenous ethnic group in Central America, of whom many are mixed race. In the northern end of their territory, the people are primarily of African-Native American ancestry; others are of mixed African-Native American and English descent. Their territory extends from Cape Camarón, Honduras, to Río Grande de Matagalpa, Nicaragua, along the Mosquito Coast, in the Western Caribbean Zone.
- The Garifuna are descendants of Carib, Arawak, and West African people. This ethnic group has its origins in a group from St. Vincent islands in the Caribbean, who came in 1797. At the 2001 census 46,448 people were registered as Garifuna, 0.8% of the total population of Honduras. The Garifuna speak an Arawakan language. They live along the entire Caribbean coastline of Honduras, and in the Bay Islands.
- The Creole people are descendants of Afro-Caribbean people who arrived originally with the introduction of enslaved Africans brought by the British to Honduras in the 16th and 17th century. Creoles also arrived with the immigration of black workers from Jamaica, Cayman Island, Trinidad and Tobago and other English-speaking islands, who arrived in the early twentieth century to work in transnational banana companies, workers in the construction of railways, dockworkers and in some cases "scabs", are concentrated mainly in the Bay Islands, especially the Roatan Island and Guanaja and Caribbean coastal Honduran cities like Puerto Cortes, Tela and La Ceiba. In the 1800s, five years before independence, the Mayor Don Juan Antonio Tomos issued a report of his visit in 1815, in which he indicated 100,000 inhabitants in the cities of Puerto Cortés, San Pedro Sula, Tela, La Ceiba, and 39 curatos and 8 villages of Caribbean blacks from countries like Jamaica, Trinidad and Tobago, Saint Lucia, Belize, and Haiti. Plus additional inhabitants near Trujillo (estimate does at 10,000) for a total of 110,000 inhabitants. After independence" the population of 1826 (200,000 people) is based on the calculation made by Mr. Dionisio de Herrera, former head of the state of Honduras. By the early 1900s more than 300,000 people had come to Honduras to work mainly in the booming banana cultivation and other agricultural sectors.

Examples of well-known Afro-Hondurans are footballers David Suazo, Victor "Muma" Bernardez, Dr. Emet Cherefant, and Wilson Palacios.

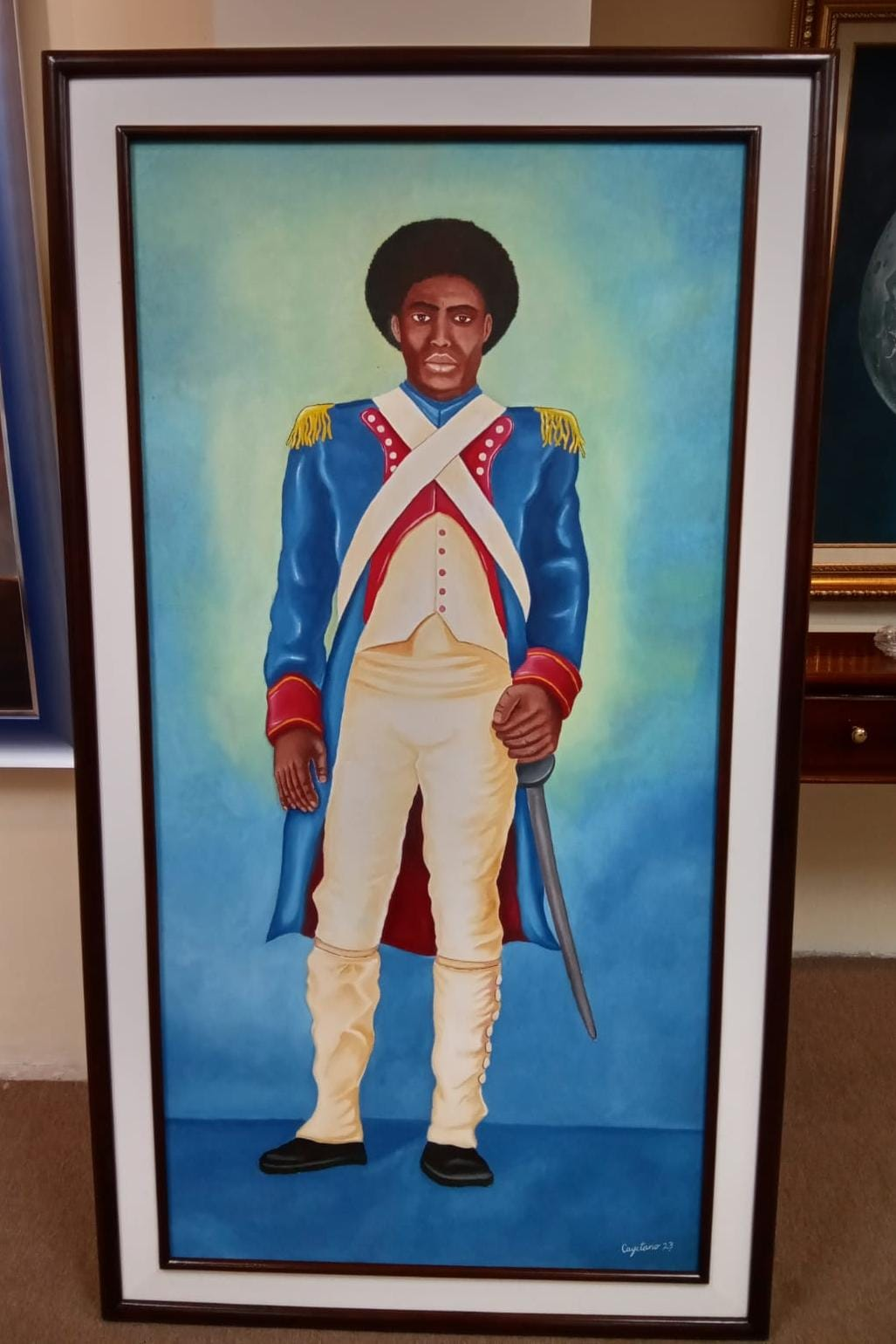
Lieutenant, Juan Francisco Bulnes

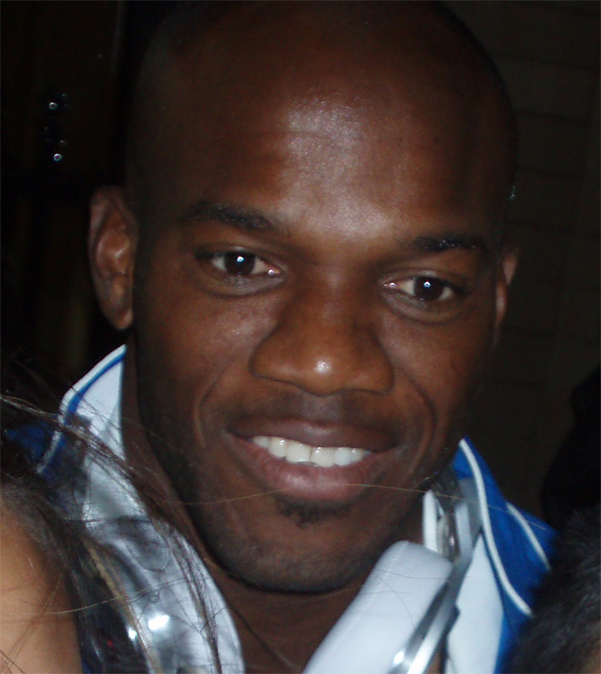
Footballer, David Suazo

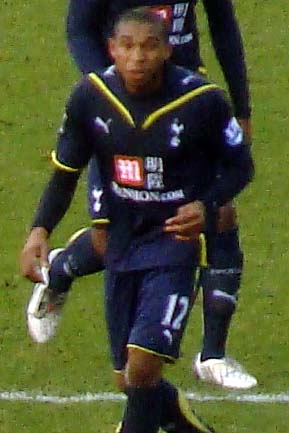
Footballer, Wilson Palacios

=== European ===
Honduras of European descent or White Hondurans, along with Afro-descendants and Amerindians belong to the minorities of Honduras. Most of the white population are descendants of the Spanish settlers, who mainly came from southern Spain, and inhabit most of the western part of the country. Other populations include descendants of European immigrants who arrived at the beginning of the 20th century. In 2014, there were about 14,000 Hondurans of Italian descent, while there were around 400 Italian citizens. Percentages of whites varied between 2.1% and 7%, due to the fact that the majority of Hondurans identify themselves as mestizos, regardless of their ethnic and racial category. This makes it more difficult to study the number of people who fit into the white category in Honduras.

The census states that only 89,000 people in Honduras labeled themselves as white, which is equal to around 1% of the total population at the time.

However, other studies report that the percentage could rise much more, reaching close to a half a million white people in Honduras, which according to official national sources would make a percentage of between 5% and 6.9% of whites in Hondurans. This is because the majority of whites in Honduras do not identify themselves as Euro-descendants as such, adopting and feeling more identified with the mestizo identity.

Examples of white Hondurans are ex-president Simon Azcona del Hoyo, pharmacologist Salvador Moncada, film director Juan Carlos Fanconi, politician Roberto Micheletti, General Florencio Xatruch and former president of the Central American federation Don Francisco Morazán Quezada.

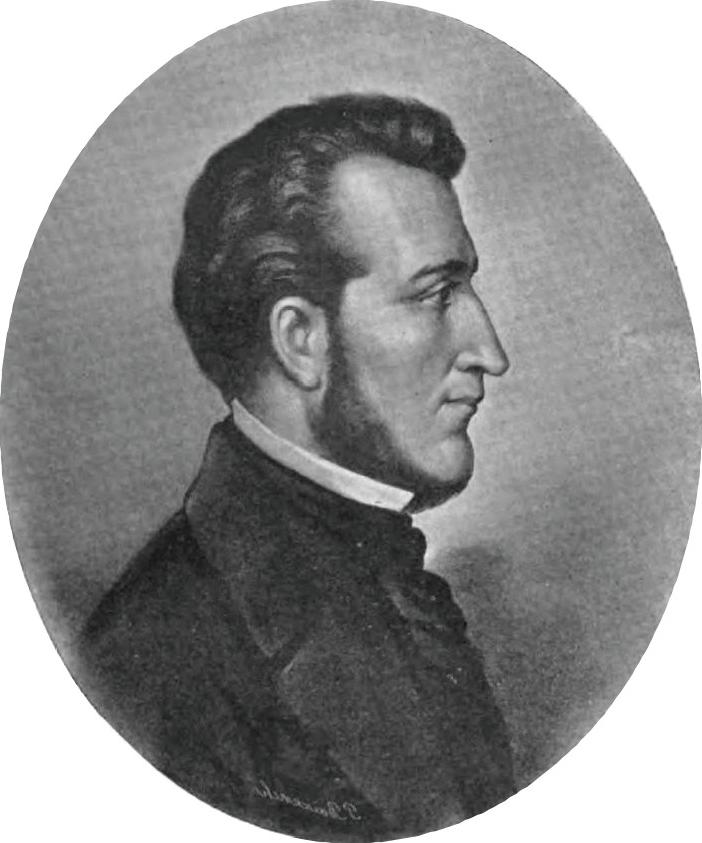
Central American president, General Francisco Morazán

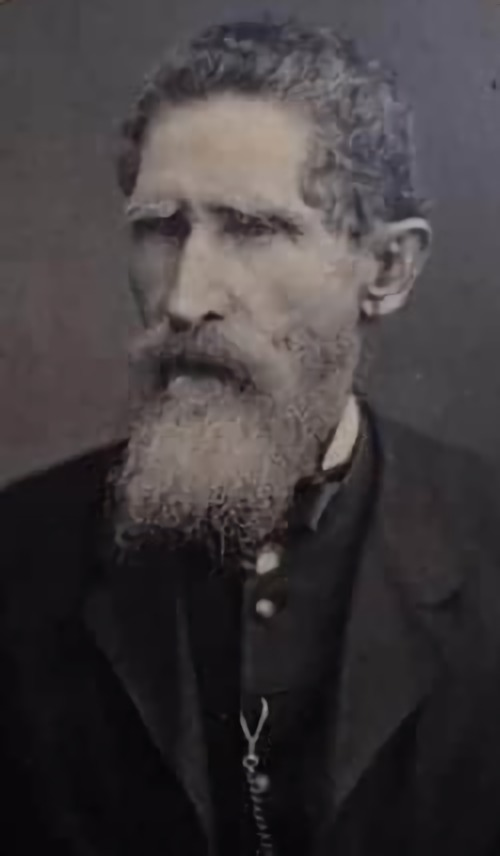
General, Florencio Xatruch

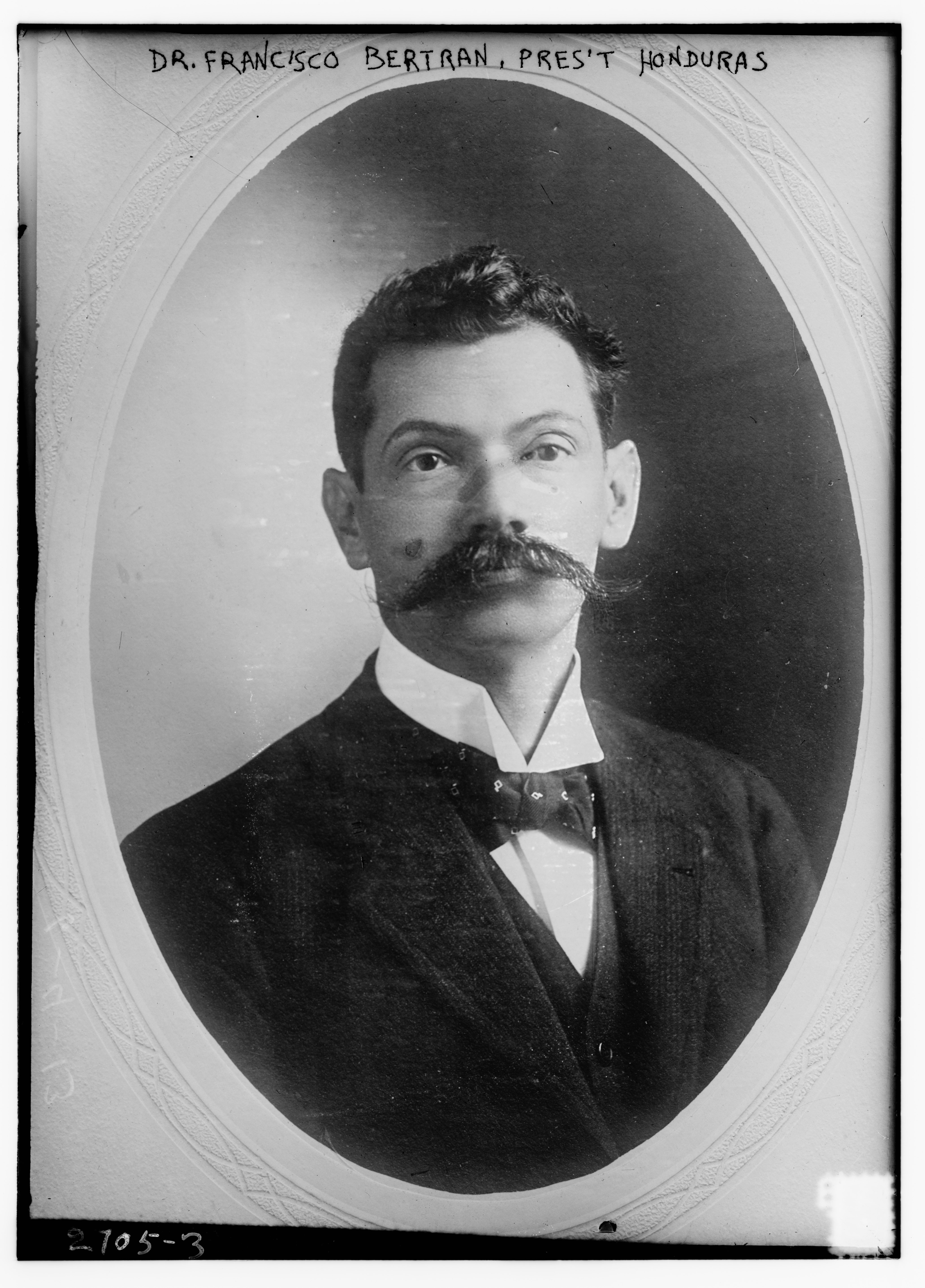
Ex-President, Francisco Bertrand

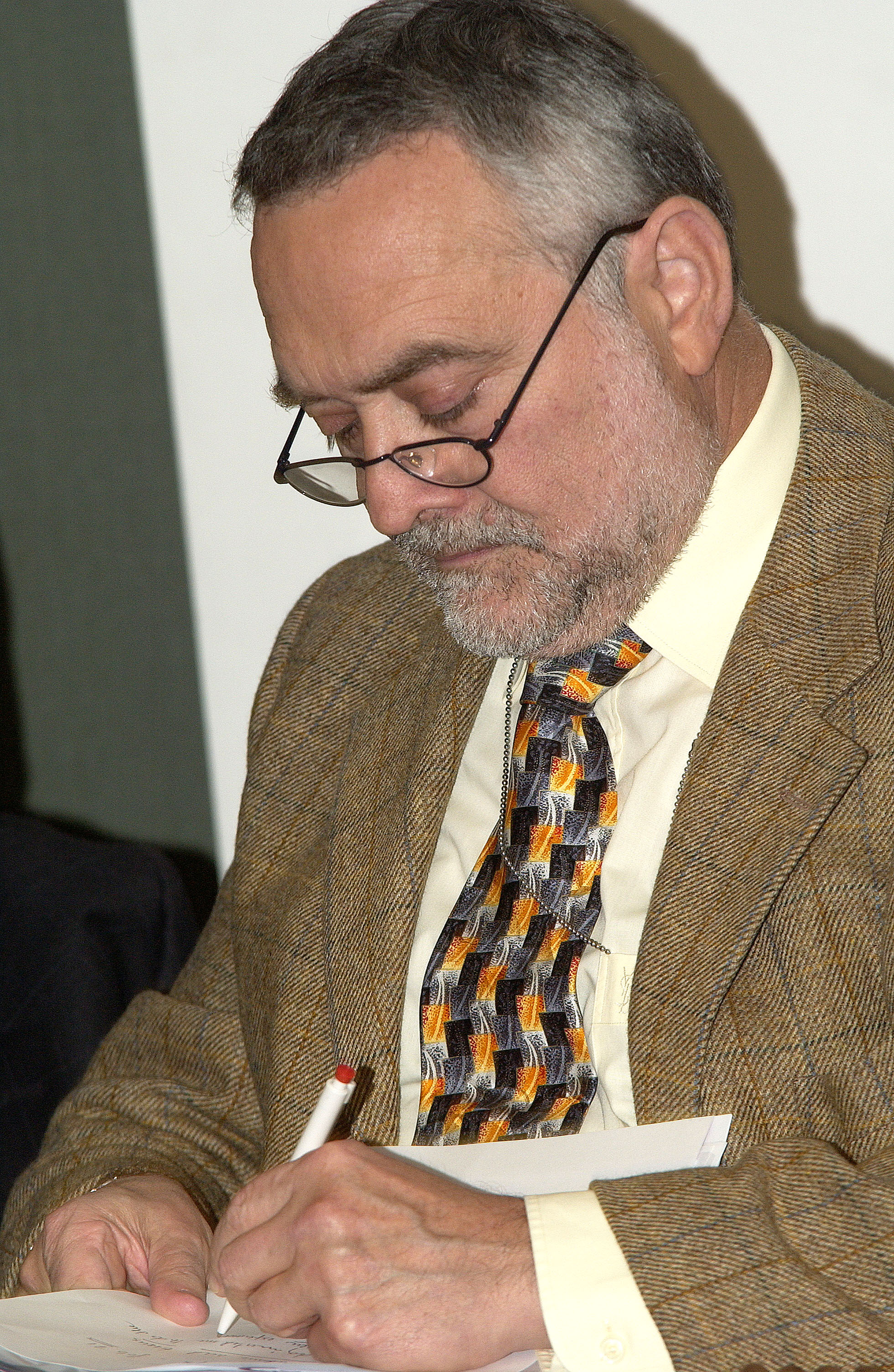
Sir. Salvador Moncada, Honduran pharmacologist

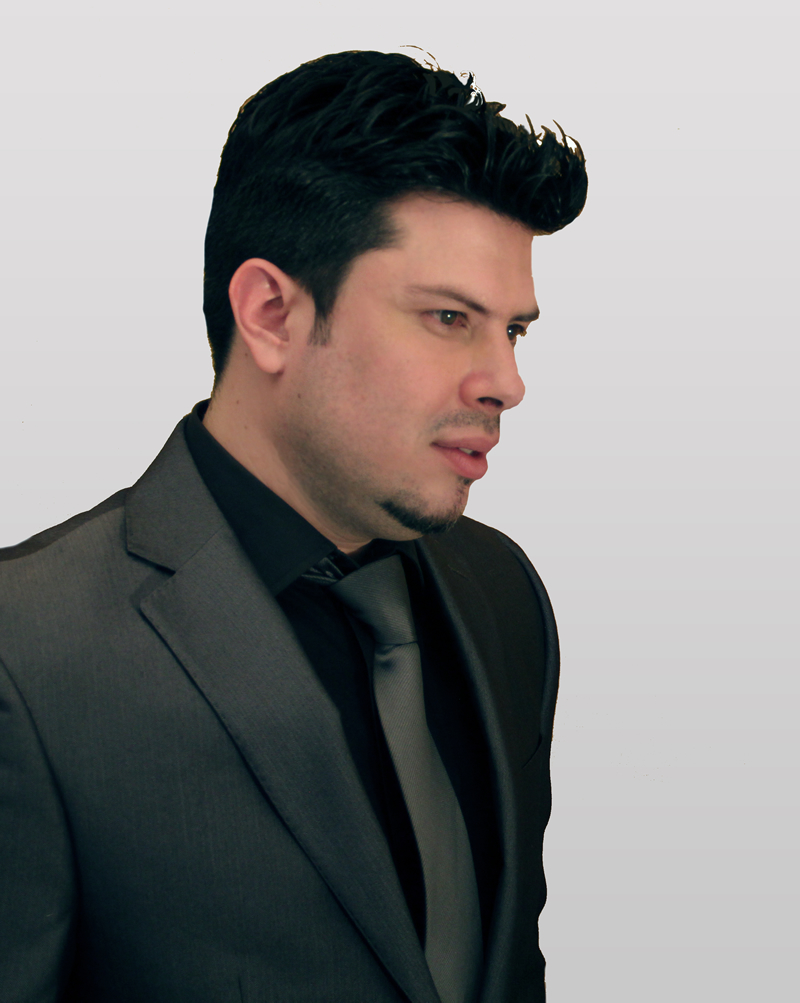
Juan Carlos Fanconi, film director

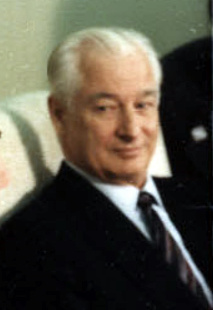
Ex president, José Simón Azcona del Hoyo

=== East Asians ===
There is a small Chinese community in Honduras. A lawyer of the Committee for the Defense of Human Rights in Honduras (CODEH) stated that the Chinese community in Honduras is rather small. Many of the Chinese are immigrants who arrived from China after the revolution and their descendants.

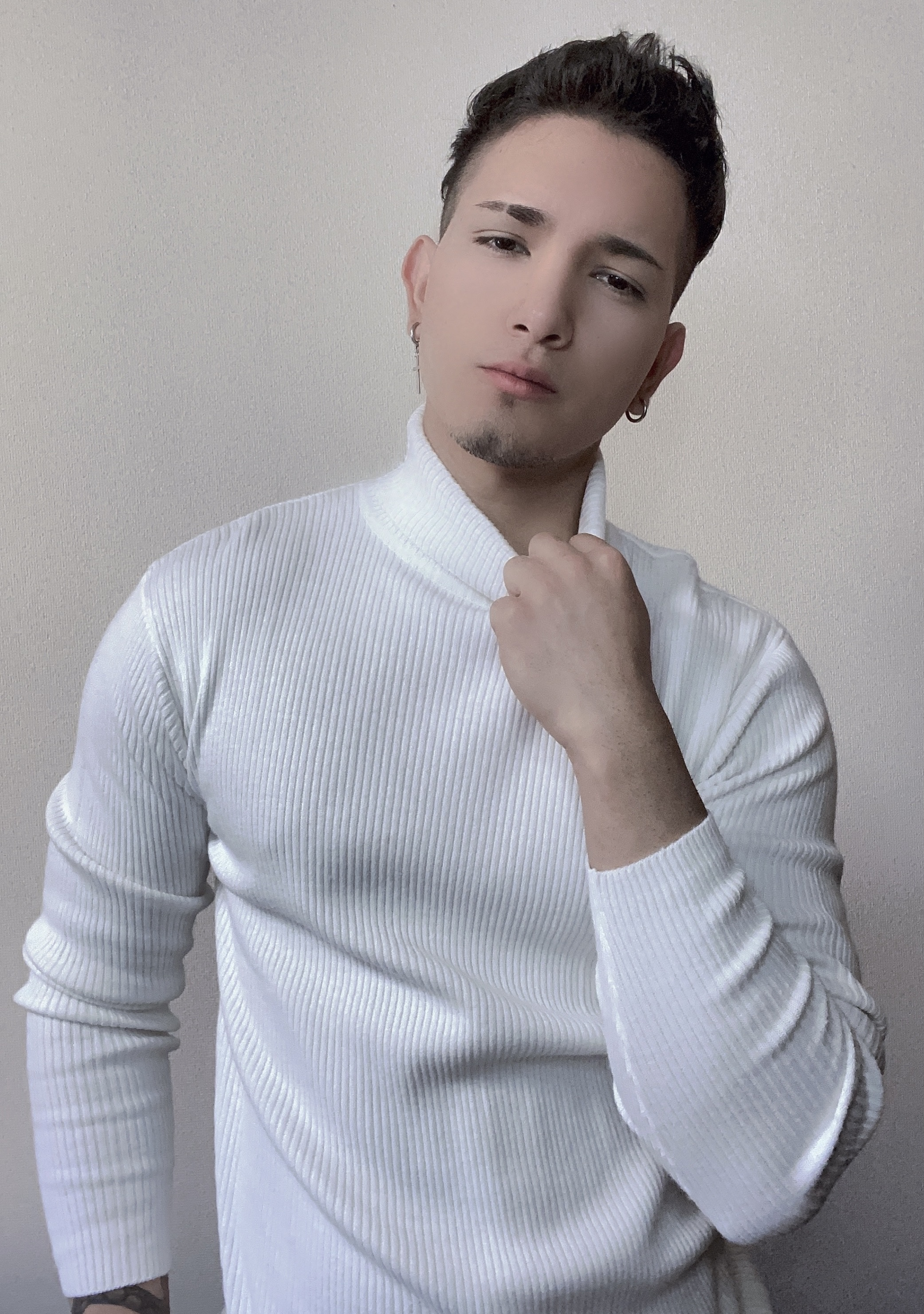
Hajime Waki, Honduran–Japanese singer.

=== Arabs ===
Honduras hosts a significant Palestinian community (the vast majority of whom are Christian Arabs). These Arab-Hondurans are sometimes called "Turcos", because they arrived in Honduras using Turkish travel documents, as their homeland was then under the control of the Ottoman Empire. The Palestinians arrived in the country in the late 19th and early 20th centuries, establishing themselves especially in the city of San Pedro Sula. As mentioned earlier, they are also considered whites in the country's censuses, in total the Arab-Hondurans make up 3% of the Honduran population.

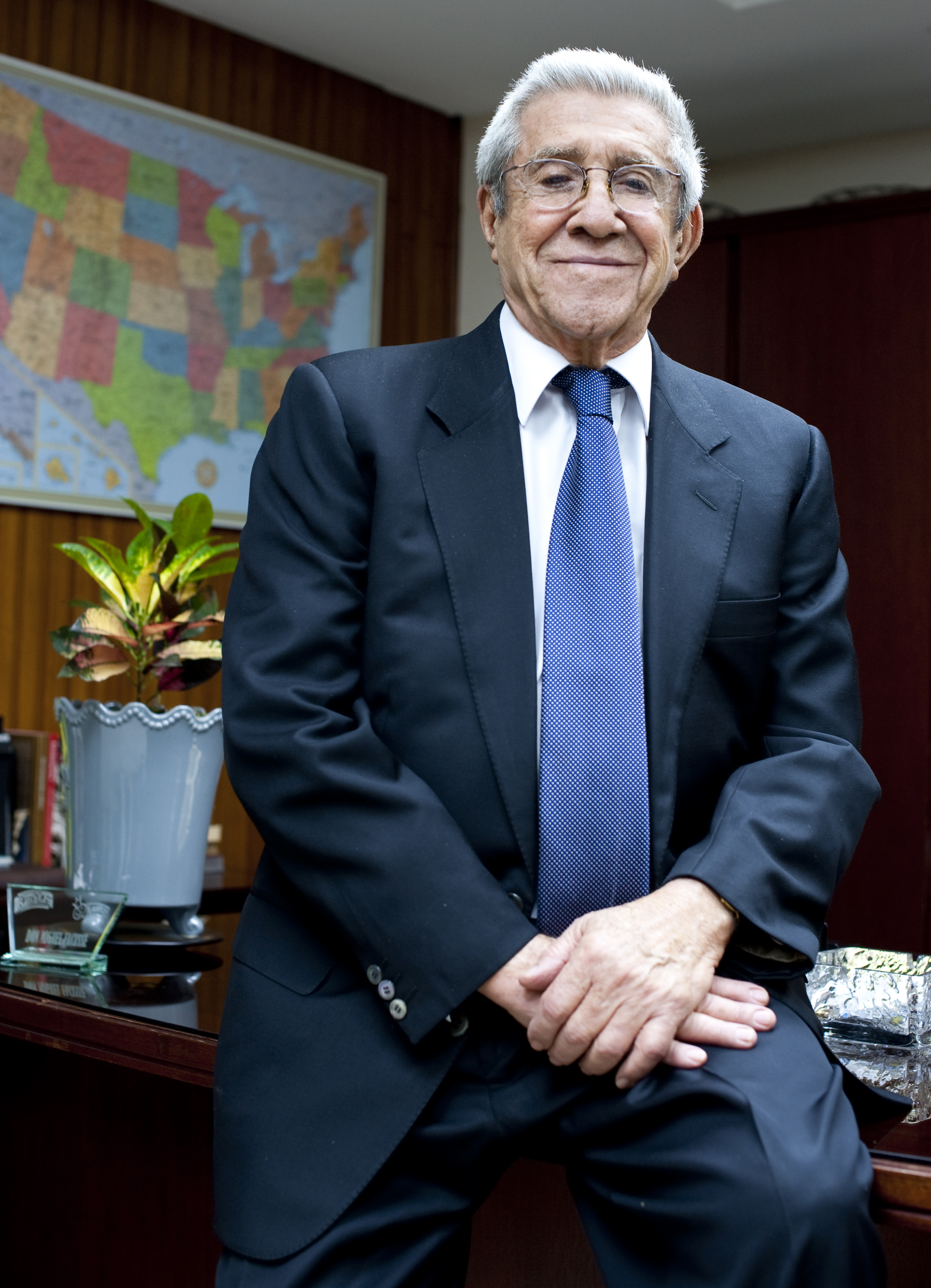
Businessman Miguel Facusse, son of immigrants from the Ottoman Empire

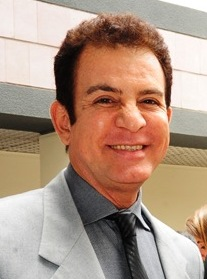
Vice President Salvador Nasralla, son of Palestinian immigrants

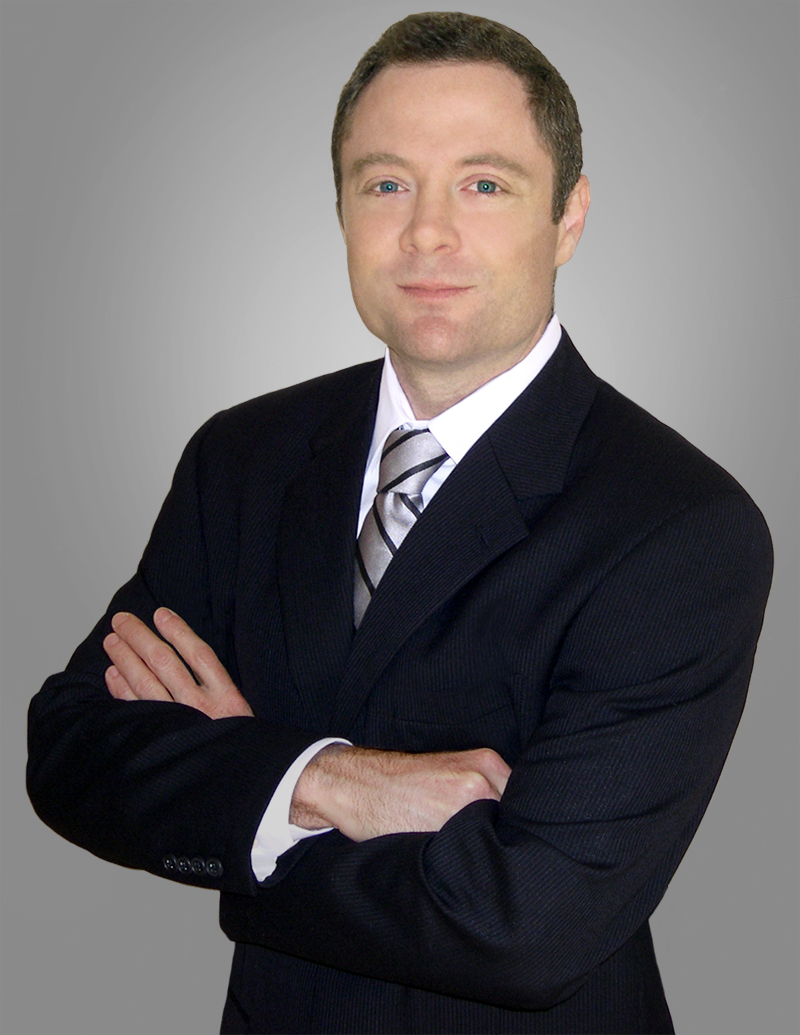
Dr Kerim Gattas Asfura

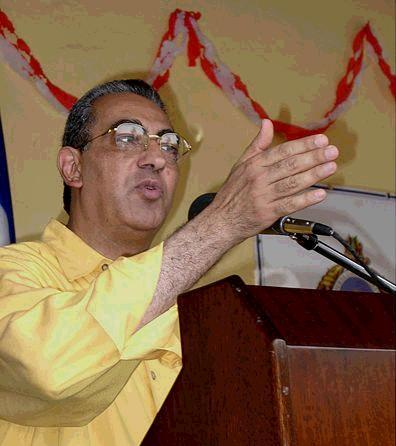
Carlos Flores Facussé, first Honduran president of arab descent

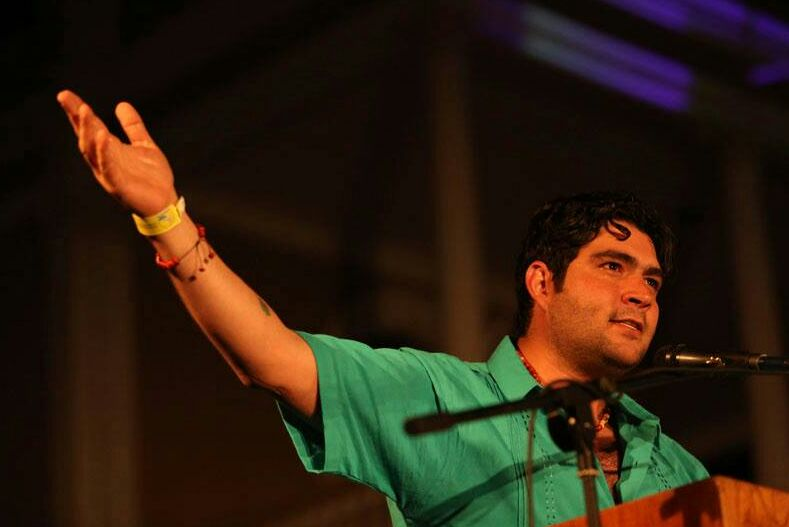
Honduran-palestinian Poet Rolando Kattan

== Immigrant groups ==
Spanish immigration to Honduras during the colonial era was the main source of the country's current white and mestizo population. It was later followed by African immigration, first brought over as slaves and later as free people of color.

Immigrants in Honduras
Country	Immigrants
United States	21,000+
El Salvador	9,000+
Nicaragua	8,000+
China	7,000+
Cuba	5,000+
Guatemala	4,000+
Mexico	2,000+
Colombia	1,000+
Costa Rica	1,000+
Spain	1,000+

== Religion ==
Religions: in Honduras %
1. Roman Catholic (46.0%)
2. Protestant (39.0%)
3. Other (15.0%)

== See also ==
- Languages of Honduras
- Ethnic groups in Central America
- History of Honduras
- Hondurans
