= LGBTQ rights in Honduras =

- Honduras
- Legal status: Legal since 1899
- Gender identity: No
- Military: No
- Discrimination protections: Sexual orientation and gender identity protections (see below)

Family rights
- Recognition of relationships: None
- Restrictions: Same-sex marriage and de facto unions prohibited by Constitution
- Adoption: Prohibited by Constitution

Lesbian, gay, bisexual, transgender and queer (LGBTQ) people in Honduras face legal challenges not experienced by non-LGBTQ residents. Both male and female types of same-sex sexual activity are legal in Honduras.

Same-sex couples and households headed by same-sex couples are not eligible for the same legal protections available to opposite-sex married couples. Same-sex marriages, de facto unions and adoption by same-sex couples have been constitutionally banned since 2005.

Similarly to neighbouring El Salvador, LGBTQ people face high rates of violence and homicide. 264 LGBTQ people, of whom approximately half were gay men, were murdered in the country between 2009 and 2017.

== Law regarding same-sex sexual activity ==
Same-sex sexual activity has been legal since 1899, provided that it involves the consent of individuals 15 years of age or more, the same as for heterosexual sex.

== Recognition of same-sex relationships ==
Homosexuality laws in Central America and the Caribbean Islands. Same-sex marriage Other type of partnership Unregistered cohabitation No recognition of same-sex couples Constitution limits marriage to opposite-sex couples Same-sex sexual activity illegal but law not enforced

Same-sex unions are not legally recognized in Honduras. In 2005, the Constitution was amended to expressly ban marriage and de facto unions between people of the same sex. The constitutional amendment also refuses to recognize same-sex marriages or unions that occurred legally in other countries (Article 112). It also prohibits same-sex couples from adopting (Article 116).

Before the November 2017 elections, three candidates for the Francisco Morazán Department from the National Party and the Christian Democratic Party announced their support for same-sex marriage, adding that they would be open to introducing a same-sex marriage bill to the National Congress. None of the three candidates won a seat in the National Congress.

On 12 October 2018, Honduran President Juan Orlando Hernández told reporters at a press conference: "Personally as a Christian, I am against marriage of persons of the same sex; obviously, it is the judiciary that, according to Honduran law, has to rule on it. [Regardless of sexual preferences] people should be treated with dignity, no matter what their inclination. People should be treated with dignity and this issue is very important."

In May 2022, the deputy of the Libertad y Refundación (Libre) Party, Manuel Rodríguez, presented a bill to the National Congress for same-sex marriage. However, the president of the Tegucigalpa Pastors' Association, Gerardo Irías, described the approval of the name change to LGBTI and the bill's claim for gays to get married as an "aberration in God's eyes". The pastor recommended the President of the Republic Xiomara Castro to stop such immoral laws and not to joke with God. Even if religious beliefs are an obstacle to this project, Rodríguez managed to bring the bill to the congress and it is still under discussion since May 24, 2022.

=== 2018 Inter-American Court of Human Rights advisory opinion ===
On 9 January 2018, the Inter-American Court of Human Rights (IACHR) issued an advisory opinion that parties to the American Convention on Human Rights should grant same-sex couples "accession to all existing domestic legal systems of family registration, including marriage, along with all rights that derive from marriage".

In May 2018, relying on the IACHR advisory opinion, Honduran LGBTQ activists filed a suit with the Supreme Court to legalise same-sex marriage in Honduras. A second case was filed shortly thereafter but was dismissed due to technical errors in November 2018. In February 2019, it was reported that the Supreme Court was expected to rule on the case within "the next few days," but was later announced in May 2019 that they were "expected to rule later this year" on both same-sex marriage and adoption.

== Discrimination protections ==
In 2013, the National Congress adopted several amendments to the Penal Code, through Decree No. 23-2013 (Spanish: Decreto No. 23-2013), including the following:

- Article 27 on the aggravating circumstances of criminal responsibility, adding "Committing a crime due to hatred or contempt because of sex, gender, religion, national origin, belonging to indigenous peoples and Afro-descendants, sexual orientation or gender identity, age, marital status or disability, ideology or political views of the victim."
- Article 321, as follows: "Shall be punished with imprisonment of three (3) to five (5) years and a fine of four (4) to seven (7) minimum wages, the person who arbitrarily and illegally blocks, restricts, reduces, prevents or defeats the exercise of individual and collective rights or denies the provision of a professional service based on sex, gender, age, sexual orientation, gender identity, party membership or political opinion, marital status, belonging to indigenous peoples and Afro-descendants, community language, language, nationality, religion, affiliation or economic family status, different abilities or disabilities, health conditions, physical appearance or any other distinction that violates the human dignity of the victim."
- Article 321-A that states: "Whoever publicly or through the media or public broadcasting, incites to discrimination, hatred, contempt, persecution or any form of violence or attacks against a person, group or association, foundations, corporations, non-governmental organizations, for any of the causes listed in the previous article shall be imposed a penalty of three (3) to five (5) years' imprisonment and a fine of fifty thousand lempiras (L.50,000.00) to three hundred thousand lempiras (L. 300,000.00).".

In March 2017, the newly enacted Penal Code came into effect. It was reported that several LGBTQ rights groups had been received in Congress to dispel doubts of the wording of some articles, and to ensure that Articles 321 and 321-A remain in force. The anti-discrimination articles were ultimately kept.

== LGBTQ rights movement in Honduras ==
The Constitution stipulates that citizens have the right to establish and associate with political parties and interest groups, though initial efforts to register an LGBTQ rights group in the 1980s were met with government opposition or extended delays. The first LGBTQ rights organizations arose in the 1980s anyway, often in response to the HIV/AIDS pandemic. Such organizations had no legal standing at the time and were essentially ignored by the Government, except for police harassment.

In 2004, the Honduran Government extended formal recognition to three LGBTQ rights interest groups, despite organized protests from the Catholic Church, Pentecostals, and conservative legislators.

The two major political parties have not expressed much support for expanding LGBTQ rights, and have mostly ignored the topic. Only a handful of dissident members within the leftist Democratic Unification Party have expressed some interest in working with the LGBT community.

== Social conditions ==
In Honduras, there is a social environment of historical discrimination against LGBTQ persons motivated by prejudice and machismo. The 2001 Law on Police and Social Affairs (Spanish: Ley de Policía y Convivencial Social) gives the police permission to raid city streets, entrap sex workers as part of "sanitation control" and arrest anyone who "goes against modesty, proper conduct and public morals." LGBTQ rights organizations have documented numerous instances in which police have used the law as a pretext for harassing and detaining transgender women.

A transgender woman ran in the 2017 elections as a candidate for the Innovation and Unity Party. Her run was ultimately unsuccessful. She received 11,112 votes, placing 136th. The National Congress has 128 seats.

About 400 people marched in a pride parade in July 2017 in the city of San Pedro Sula, considered to be one of the most dangerous cities in the world.

=== Anti-LGBT violence ===
In December 2014, LGBTQ rights group Red Lésbica Cattrachas reported that from 2009 to 2014, 174 violent deaths of LGBTQ persons were registered in the country (90 gays, 15 lesbians, and 69 transgender people), primarily in the departments of Cortés and Francisco Morazán.

In previous years, it was reported that possibly as many as 200 Hondurans might have been killed because of their real or perceived sexual orientation or gender identity between 1993–2003.

International human rights organizations have stated that the military Government has targeted LGBTQ people for harassment, abuse and murder.

In June 2013, a transsexual woman was given asylum in Spain after a police officer had tried to assassinate her in Honduras.

Walter Tróchez, a Honduran political activist and LGBTQ rights leader, was allegedly assassinated on 13 December 2009, by members of the anti-Zelaya regime for organizing dissent against the new Government. Earlier that year, on 2 January, transgender activist Cynthia Nicole was shot dead by unknown assailants.

Another visible LGBTQ Honduran activist and Zelayista, Erick Martínez Ávila, was murdered on 7 May 2012 on the outskirts of Tegucigalpa. On 10 January 2022, trans activist Thalía Rodríguez was shot dead in her home in Tegucigalpa.

=== HIV/AIDS ===
The socially conservative influence of the Catholic Church and evangelical Protestants has made it difficult for any comprehensive public program to be implemented. Female prostitutes and men who have sex with men are seen as the highest risk groups. The Government does offer medical care to all citizens and has been increasingly working with non-governmental organizations to raise awareness.

== Public opinion ==
According to a Pew Research Center survey, conducted between 9 November and 19 December 2013, 13% of respondents supported same-sex marriage, 83% were opposed.

The 2017 AmericasBarometer showed that 19% of Hondurans supported same-sex marriage.

A 2018 CID Gallup poll found that 75% of Hondurans opposed same-sex marriage, 17% were in support, and the rest didn't know or refused to answer.

== Summary table ==
Same-sex sexual activity legal	(Since 1899)
Equal age of consent (15)	
Anti-discrimination laws in employment only	(Since 2013)
Anti-discrimination laws in the provision of goods and services	(Since 2013)
Anti-discrimination laws in all other areas (incl. indirect discrimination, hate speech)	(Since 2013)
Hate crimes laws include sexual orientation and gender identity	(Since 2013)
Same-sex marriages	(Constitutional ban since 2005)
Recognition of same-sex couples	(Constitutional ban on de facto unions since 2005)
Stepchild adoption by same-sex couples	(Constitutional ban since 2005)
Joint adoption by same-sex couples	(Constitutional ban since 2005)
LGBTQ people allowed to serve openly in the military	
Right to change legal gender	
Access to IVF for lesbians	
Commercial surrogacy for gay male couples	
MSMs allowed to donate blood	(Since 2024)

== See also ==
- San Pedro Sula Pride
- Human rights in Honduras

General:

- LGBTQ rights in the Americas
- Same-sex union court cases
