= Cynthia Nicole =

Honduran transgender activist (1976–2009)

Cynthia Nicole (c. 1976–9 January 2009) was a Honduran human rights activist. A trans woman, she was known for her advocacy for the transgender community in the city of Comayagüela until her murder in 2009.

== Biography ==
After coming out as a trans woman, Nicole worked for a time as a sex worker in Comayagüela. She later stated that she and other transgender people, despite having the legal right to access work and education, were forced into sex work due to discrimination within Honduran society, including their genders not being reflected in their official identification documents, causing a barrier to accessing public services and legal work. Nicole often filed police reports of such discrimination, but stated publicly that transgender people were "not a priority" for the police and local authorities.

Nicole went on to become a leader and spokesperson for Colectivo Violeta, a non-governmental organisation established in 1995 to "support and defend" the rights of transgender people living in Comayagüela. Nicole became known for providing outreach support to sex workers working in Comayagüela and Tegucigalpa, including providing advice and information about HIV and AIDS, as well as informing them about their basic human rights. Nicole frequently appeared in local media and conferences as a representative of the transgender community, such as at the First National Congress of Trans People on Human Rights and Universal Access, held in Tegucigalpa on 5 December 2008.

At around 01:00 CST on 9 January 2009, Nicole was shot three times in the chest and once in the head by three men in a drive-by shooting in Barrio Guaserique, Comayagüela. She later died of her injuries. By 12 January, police officers reported that they had located the perpetrators' blue car, as well as bullet casings related to the shooting. As of 2014, no one had been prosecuted or charged with Nicole's murder. In the two months prior to her murder, five transgender activists had been attacked in Honduras, with two killed, including Nicole's friend and fellow sex worker Yasmin.

Following Nicole's death, Honduran activists claimed that the police and the judiciary were failing to properly investigate her murder. The Inter-American Commission on Human Rights publicly condemned Nicole's murder; two special rapporteurs from the United Nations expressed their "serious concern" about the safety and wellbeing of transgender activists living in Honduras.

== Recognition ==
The New York-based human rights group Human Rights Watch recognised Nicole for "fighting tirelessly to secure basic rights protections for transgender sex workers" and called on Honduran authorities to "find and prosecute" both Nicole's killers and the assailants of attacks against other transgender people in Honduras. In its World Report 2010, it stated that the investigation into Nicole's murder had not been "effective" and had failed to result in either the prosecution or the conviction of the perpetrators.

In 2014, Canadian politician Randall Garrison referenced Nicole's work and death during a debate in the House of Commons on the Canada-Honduras Economic Growth and Prosperity Act.

In 2018, Nicole was described by Indyra Mendoza as a "comrade" and commemorated by her, alongside other murdered Honduran activists Bertha Cárcares and Walter Tróchez.

In 2020, following the murder of transgender activist Bessy Ferrera, the international feminist group Association for Women's Rights in Development called for action concerning violence against trans women in Honduras, citing the deaths of other trans activists, including Nicole.
