= Western Jicaque language =

Extinct Jicaquean language of Honduras

Western Jicaque
- Jicaque of El Palmar
- Sula
- Native to: Honduras
- Region: Cortés Department
- Extinct: late 20th century?
- Language family: Hokan ?: Jicaquean; Western Jicaque

Language codes
- ISO 639-3: None (mis)
- Glottolog: west2777
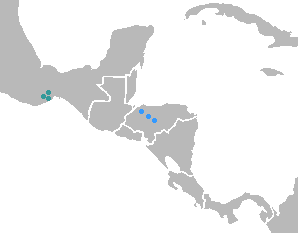
- Map of Jicaquean and Tequistlatecan languages

Western Jicaque, also known as Jicaque of El Palmar and Sula, now extinct, was a Jicaquean language spoken around El Palmar, Cortés Department, near Chamelecón in Honduras. It was attested in wordlists from the 1890s.
