= San Pedro Sula Pride =

Annual LGBTQ event in San Pedro Sula, Honduras

San Pedro Sula LGBT Pride March
- Genre: Pride march
- Date: Annually
- Frequency: Yearly
- Location: San Pedro Sula
- Country: Honduras
- Inaugurated: 2000

The San Pedro Sula LGBT Pride March is an annual demonstration held in San Pedro Sula, Honduras, in commemoration of International LGBT Pride Day. The first edition was held in 2000, and since then it has gathered hundreds of participants each year, reaching around a thousand participants in 2022.

The demonstration is held as a way to give visibility to the LGBT population in Honduras and to demand equal rights. The route typically goes from Third Avenue along First Street to the Plaza de las Banderas, next to the Francisco Morazán Stadium. The sixth edition of the march, held in 2006, was the first to include a contingent made up exclusively of lesbian women, who were part of a group called “Mujer sin límite.” The 2022 edition was notable for the participation of political figures such as the city’s vice mayor, Omar Menjívar, the governor of the Department of Cortés, Alexa Solórzano, and congressman Víctor Grajeda.

== See also ==
- Sexual diversity in Honduras
- Recognition of same-sex unions in Honduras
