= Thalía Rodríguez =

Honduran human rights activist (1963–2022)

- Born: 1963; Olancho Department, Honduras
- Died: 11 January 2022 (aged 58–59); Tegucigalpa, Honduras
- Cause of death: Gunshot wounds
- Occupation: Human rights activist
- Known for: Advocacy for LGBTQ people, sex workers and people living with HIV in Honduras

Thalía Rodríguez (c. 1963–10 January 2022) was a Honduran human rights activist. A trans woman, she was known for her advocacy for the LGBTQ community in Honduras, particularly sex workers and people living with HIV. Rodríguez was murdered in 2022; as of 2026, her death remains unsolved.

== Personal life and activism ==
Rodríguez was born in Olancho Department; she and her family moved to Tegucigalpa, the capital and largest city in Honduras, when she was two years old. Rodríguez later became ostracised from her family after coming out as a trans woman. She chose the name "Thalía" after the Mexican singer of the same name.

Rodríguez subsequently found it difficult to find legal work due to her gender identity not being reflected in her official documents; as a result, by the 1990s she was a sex worker in Tegucigalpa. Rodríguez was later diagnosed as having HIV. She was later able to leave sex work after travelling to different villages selling spices, and by 2011 established a shop at her home on Juana Laínez Hill, which she operated until 2021.

In 2004, Rodríguez's close friend and fellow trans woman, Leonela Zelaya, was murdered. Rodríguez, who had lived and worked with Zelaya, later collected her body and arranged her funeral at a bar in Tegucigalpa. After the Inter-American Court of Human Rights opened an investigation into Zelaya's death, Rodríguez was officially recognised as a victim and therefore a plaintiff in the case. The classification of Rodríguez as a plaintiff, citing her relationship with Zelaya and the impact her murder had on Rodríguez's life, marked the first time social networks and the concept of chosen family for people with little or no contact with their biological families was used when considering victims in a case, and set a precedent for other trans people.

Following the court case, Rodríguez became known as a leader in the transgender and LGBTQ community. She led the Asociación Cozumel Trans, a trans rights group, until her death, and was also a member of other Honduran LBGTQ groups, including the Asociación Kukulcán, Cattrachas and Colectivo Violet. Rodríguez carried out human rights awareness both for and about marginalised communities in Honduras, including LBGTQ people, sex workers, and people living with HIV. She also ran self-help groups and supported sex workers to access alternative jobs. Rodríguez campaigned for the Honduran government to establish a legal framework to allow trans people's gender identities to be recognised in their identification documents, which she felt would make it easier for them to obtain legal work.

In 2021, the Inter-American Court on Human Rights, in Vicky Hernández et al. v. Honduras, held the state of Honduras as responsible for the 2009 murder of trans activist Vicky Hernández. Among the court's recommendations was that Honduran authorities make efforts to legally recognise the gender identity of trans people. Rodríguez called the ruling an "advance" for trans people in Honduras.

== Murder and response ==
On 10 January 2022, Rodríguez was shot dead while in bed at her home in Tegucigalpa at the age of 58 by a group of unidentified men. She was shot several times in the head; her partner, who was in bed with her, was also shot multiple times, but survived. Rodríguez's neighbours reported she had been threatened and attacked prior to her murder. Rodríguez's death marked the 402nd confirmed transfemicide in Honduras since the murder of Vicky Hernández in 2009; she was the second human rights activist, and the first LGBTQ activist, to be killed in Honduras in 2022. On 30 January, a member of the MS-13 gang was arrested in relation to Rodríguez's murder; he was later released due to a lack of evidence.

Cozumel Trans, of which Rodríguez had served as president, demanded justice for her murder. Muñecas de Arcoíris, another trans rights group, described Rodríguez as a "warrior", and condemned her murder. PBI Honduras released a statement expressing its "deep regret" for her death, describing her as a "tireless advocate" for the Honduran LBGTQ community.

The Robert & Ethel Kennedy Human Rights Center issued a joint statement alongside the Honduran LGBTQ group Cattrachas, of which Rodríguez had been a member, condemning her murder and demanding that the Public Ministry make "all necessary efforts" to "identify and punish" those responsible for her death, as well as calling on the Inter-American Court on Human Rights to open an investigation.

The United Nations High Commissioner for Human Rights' condemned Rodríguez's murder, and called for a "prompt, thorough and independent" investigation. The United States embassy in Honduras expresses its condolences and called for an "immediate and transparent" investigation.
