= Erick Martínez Ávila =

Honduran advocate (1980–2012)

Alexander Erick Martínez Ávila
- Born: January 18, 1980
- Died: May 5, 2012 (aged 32); Tegucigalpa, Honduras
- Cause of death: Asphyxiation by strangulation
- Body discovered: Along a roadside near the village of Aldea Guasculile in Olancho province
- Education: National Autonomous University of Honduras / Universidad Nacional Autónoma de Honduras
- Occupations: Journalist & public relations
- Organization: Asociación Kukulcán
- Known for: running for legislative elections
- Political party: Libre party / Partido Libertad Y Refundación
- Movement: National Popular Resistance Front / Frente Nacional de Resistencia Popular

Alexander Erick Martínez Ávila, also known as Erick Martínez, (January 18, 1980 - May 5, 2012) was a Honduran advocate and spokesperson for lesbian, gay, bisexual, and transgender (LGBT) minority rights in Tegucigalpa, Honduras. A former journalist, he went into public relations for Asociación Kukulcán. He was also known to be a "Zelayista" activist. Days after his announcement to run as a Resistencia Party congressional candidate in the November elections, Martínez went missing and was found strangled to death about 3 kilometers from the capital.

Of those murdered in Honduras, Martínez is one of between 20 and 62 LGBT Hondurans since 2010 and one of 22 journalists and supporters of ousted president Manuel Zelaya since the 2009 Honduran coup d'état.

Another visible LGBT Honduran activist and Zelayista, Walter Tróchez, was murdered on 13 December 2009 in Tegucigalpa.

== Career ==
Ávila studied journalism at the Universidad Nacional Autónoma de Honduras. He contributed to a number of HIV publications, where he brought light to issues concerning HIV and human rights in Honduras. He was best known as the spokesman of Kukulcán. In this organization he co-facilitated the Speaking Out! regional HIV advocacy training for MSM and transgender advocates. This was held in Tela, Honduras. His involvement in MSM and also founding the Diversity Resistance Movement (MDR) led to his nomination to run for office in the Francisco Morazán Department for the Libre party, the political wing of the National Popular Resistance Front.

== Death ==
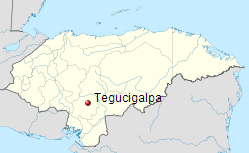
Geographical location of Honduras

Ávila was selected as a candidate for the National Congress of Honduras in the November national elections because of his support for the LGBT community in Honduras. Three weeks after his announcement for candidacy, Martínez went missing. Two days later, on 7 May 2012, his body was found in a ditch on the road between Olancho Department and Tegucigalpa and 3 km from the capital outside Aldea Guasculile. He appeared to have been beaten and died of asphyxia by strangulation. There is no clear motive behind his death.

== Context ==
The murder rate in Honduras has risen dramatically in the last few years as a result of political instability, drug trafficking and organized crime. The murder per capita in Honduras has risen from 86 to 92 per every 100,000 people from 2011 to 2012. Honduras recorded 6,700 homicides in 2011 in a nation of 8 million.

President Manuel Zelaya was forced from office in a coup on June 28, 2009. President Porfirio Lobo Sosa had lost to Zelaya in 2005 and ran again and won in the November 2009 elections that followed the coup. Initially, the United States criticized the Honduran military's role in deposing the nation's democratically elected leader. However, it sent signs of support for the newly elected President Lobo after his election and the US continued to send military and security aid for drug enforcement and crime. The US broke off assistance for four months to the Hondurans in their fight against drug trafficking after the Honduran Air Force shot down several airplanes in a violation of international law in July 2012. Impunity in Honduras, especially in the high visibility cases of journalists and lawyers, is one factor behind members of the US Congress applying pressure on the US administration to withhold $50 million in aid unless Honduras was able to show an improvement in its human rights situation. According to a report in The Nation, 10,000 civilian complaints against the abuse of power have gone uninvestigated since the 2009 coup.

As a result, in the elections that Ávila was to participate in, former President Zelaya's wife Xiomara Castro was elected to lead the party in the 2013 presidential elections, with Zelaya running for Congress instead.

== Impact ==
In December 2011, the United States announced that it would take violations of gay rights into account in foreign policy decisions, and at the time Honduras had witnessed significant levels of murders and attacks on the LGBT population.

In a forum Ávila had led before his murder, he criticized Honduras for the surge of hate crimes after the coup d'état and also said that the Honduran Constitution had no definition for a hate crime.

== Reactions ==
The Global Forum on MSM & HIV (MSMGF) demanded an investigation into the murder of Erick Martínez. The organization praised him for his work in the LGBT community.

10 days after the killing of Ávila, radio host Alfredo Villatoro was found dead. Irina Bokova, director-general of UNESCO, said, "I am deeply concerned about this second journalist killed in Honduras in a month and call on the authorities to bring to justice the perpetrators of this crime against the basic human right of freedom of expression. Freedom of expression is the cornerstone of democracy and rule of law and it is essential that journalists be allowed to contribute freely to political and social debate."

== See also ==
- List of journalists killed in Honduras
