= Indigenous peoples of Honduras =

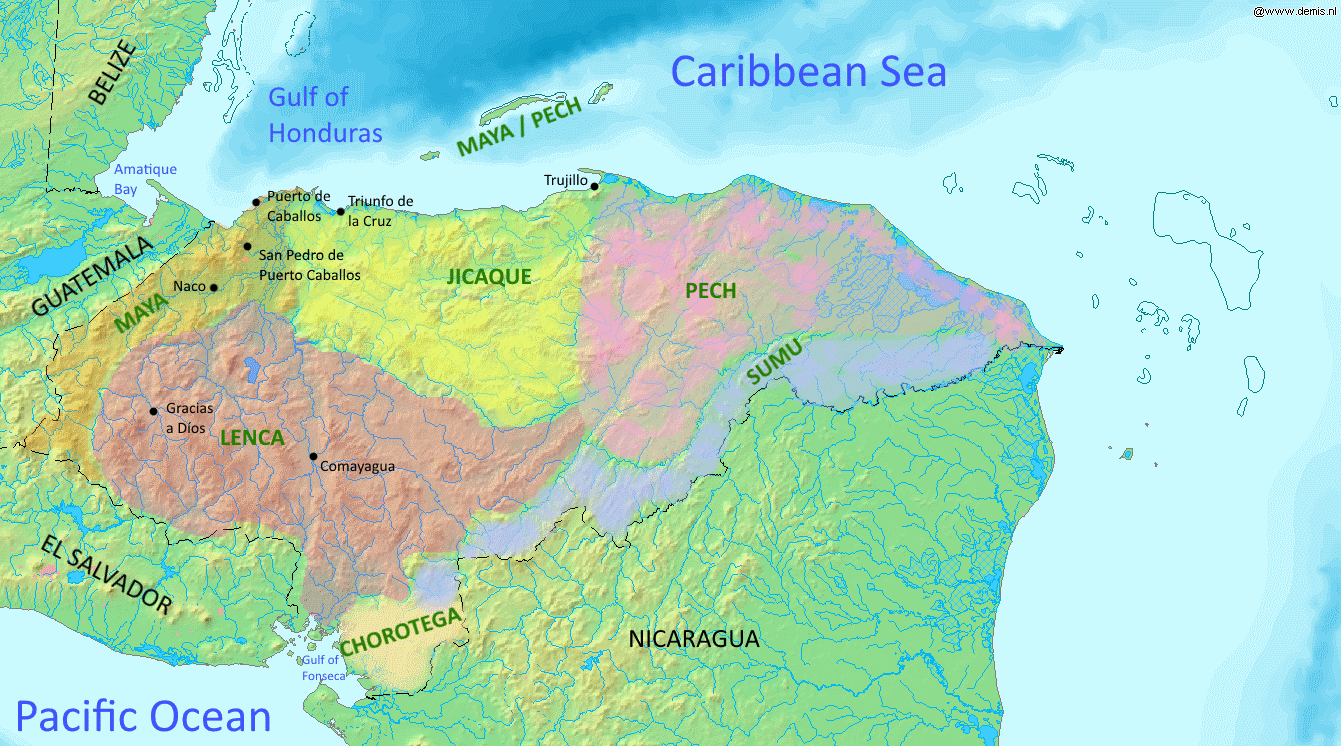
Hypothetical distribution of various Indigenous ethnic groups within the territory of Modern Honduran in the 16th century.

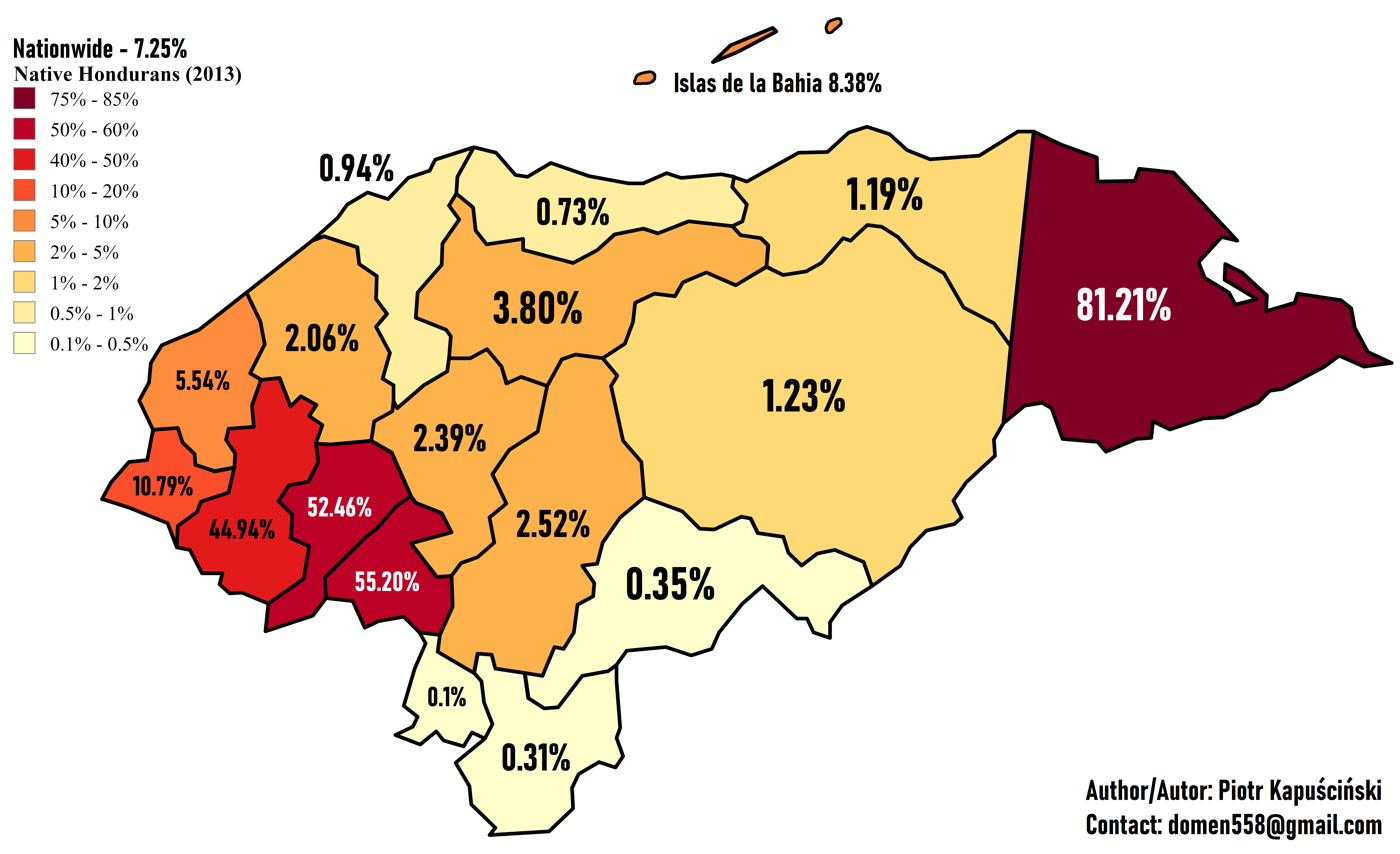
Distribution of Native Hondurans according to the 2013 census

According to the 2013 census, the Indigenous groups that live in Honduras include the Lenca (453,672), Miskito (80,007), Maya Ch'orti (33,256), Tolupan (19,033), Nahuas (6,339), Pech (6,024) and Tawahka (2,690).

== Contemporary groups ==
- Lenca
- Miskito people
- Pech people
- Garifuna
