= Jicaquean languages =

Language family of Honduras

Jicaquean
- Tolan
- Geographic distribution: Honduras
- Ethnicity: Tolupan
- Linguistic classification: Hokan ?: Tequistlatecan–Jicaquean ?; Jicaquean
- Subdivisions: Tol (Eastern Jicaque); Western Jicaque †; ?Ciguayo †

Language codes
- Glottolog: jica1245
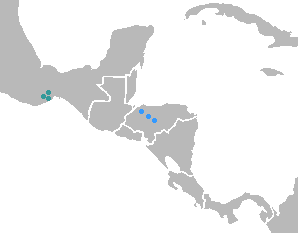
- The Jicaque languages are in Honduras in the center of the map.

Jicaquean, also known as Tolan, is a small language family of Honduras. There are two attested Jicaquean languages, Tol (Eastern Jicaque) and Western Jicaque (Holt 1999), which Campbell (1997) reports were about as distant as English and Swedish. Only Tol survives.

== Classification ==
Prior to an influential paper by Greenberg and Swadesh in 1953 Tol (a.k.a. Eastern Jicaque) was thought to be a language isolate, i.e., there existed no knowledge as to its possible genetic affinities. They argued that Tol should be added to the Hokan stock, a large language stock, phylum or family, which was proposed by R. B. Dixon and Alfred D. Kroeber in 1913. In 1977, David Oltrogge proposed to link Tol to the extinct Subtiaba language of Nicaragua, and also to Chontal of Oaxaca, also known as Tequistlateco. This indirectly amounted to a mere sub-classification, since all of the three languages in question were part of the proposed Hokan stock. A couple of years later, Campbell and Oltrogge published a reconstruction of Jicaquean phonemes, based on the available information on Western and Eastern Jicaque. In that same paper they expressed strong doubt in the Hokan affiliation of Tol and mild enthusiasm regarding the possible link to Chontal of Oaxaca, but stressed that much more information was needed to be able to say anything reasonable. More recently, Kaufman has expressed his continuing support of the Hokan affiliation of Tol.

Julian Granberry & Gary Vescelius (2004) propose that the extinct Ciguayo language of Hispaniola has its closest relatives in the Tolan languages.

== Proto-language ==
Proto-Jicaque
- Reconstruction of: Jicaquean languages

Proto-Jicaque reconstructions by Campbell and Oltrogge (1980), along with daughter language data from Campbell (1999). Note minor differences in transcription.

Proto-Jicaque reconstructions by Campbell and Oltrogge (1980)

no.	gloss	Proto-Jicaque	Western Jicaque	Tol
2	all	*pʰɨ(t)		
3	always	*han-		
5	arm, back, shoulder	*pʰel	pʰen	pʰel
7	arrow	*ȼimea ?	harek	halek
8	ashes	*pʰɨpʰɨh	pʰɨbɨh	pʰɨpʰɨh
13	to be	*kʼos		
16	bed	*kʰan	kan	kʰan
17	belly	*-kol	kon	kol
18	big	*pɨneh ?	pɨné	pɨné
24	black	*te(kʰ)	te	te
27	blood	*kʼas	kat	ʔas
28	blue	*ȼu(h)	ču(h)	tsu
30	body	*pʼɨ(y)	pɨj	pʼɨj
32	bone	*kʰele	kere	kʰele
34	bow (of bow and arrow)	*halek		
37	to burn	*tV-pʷe	to-bwe	to-pwe
38	bush (forest)	*hokʼ-la		
40	buzzard	*mantɨ		
45	cloud	*mol	mon	mol
46	coal(s)	*ȼʰek		
51	cougar	*pɨkʼa(-he)		
59	daughter	*(ku)kus		
62	deer	*pʼɨs	pɨt	pʼɨs
63	to die	*pɨʔ ?		
65	dog	*ȼʰiyo(h)	ʃijó	tsʰijó
66	to drink	*mɨʔ		
67	(to) dry	*pʰa	-pʰa	-pʰa
69	ear	*pʰaȼʼ	pat	pʰatsʼ
70	earth, land	*(a)ma(h)	ma	ma
71	to eat	*la ?		
72	egg	*pehey		
75	excrement	*pɨ(y)		
78	far	*kampa	kamba	kampa
79	father	*(pa)pa(y)		
84	fire	*kʼawa	kaw-	ʔaw-a
85	firewood	*wɨ(t)		
86	fish	*kʰul	kun	kʰul
89	flea	*pel		
91	fly	*noȼoȼ	nočot	notsots
93	forehead	*wala	wara	wala
94	to forget	*-pɨʔ		
95	four	*(y)ulupʰana	urubana	(j)ulupʰana
97	fruit	*wolas		
99	to give	*-tekʼa	te-ga	te-ʔa
101	good	*wɨ(k)		
102	grain (cf. maize)	*hulup	huruk	hulup
103	grandmother, female	*(mɨ)mɨy		
104	to grind	*kʰol ?	to-gon-	to-kʰol
106	hair	*ȼʼil	čin	tsʼil
107	hand	*mas ?		
108	he, that	*hup	huk	hup
109	head	*ha(y)pʰuk	abuk	ajpʰuk
110	to hear	*pʰak		
111	heart	*has-	hoč(uruk)	hos-
114	horn	*ȼʰeme	ʃeme	tsʰeme
115	house	*wa	wa	wa
117	I	*nap ?	nak	nap
119	intestines	*ȼʼul	-čun	tsʼul
123	knee	*tikʼ-		
125	to laugh	*wiʔ		
126	leg	*tek	tek	tek
128	lip	*lɨp	rɨk	lɨp
129	liver	*kom	kon	kom
131	long	*kampa	kamba	kampa
132	to look for	*pal-		
133	louse	*tɨtʼ	tɨt	tɨtʼ
135	macaw	*pʼɨsa(h)	pɨčá	pʼɨsá
137	male, grandfather	*(ko)koy		
138	man	*yom		
140	meat	*pis	pit	pis
143	moon	*mɨmɨy		
144	month	*mɨy-pʰini(h)		
148	mouth	*lala		
149	much	*pɨlɨk	pɨrɨk	pɨlɨk
150	my, mine	*naȼaʔ		
152	navel	*lulu		
153	nephew	*kelew ?	keré	kelé
155	no	*ma-		
156	nose	*mik	mik	mik
157	to nurse	*ȼoʔ	čo?-	tsoʔ
158	oak	*ȼʼolol	čoron	tsʼolol
159	one	*pʰani(h)		
164	parrot	*kʰuyu(h)	kujuh	kʰujuh
168	red	*he(h)	he	he
172	round	*mul- ?		
175	salt	*ȼolim	čorin	tsolin
177	sandal, shoe	*ȼompit		
178	scorpion	*ȼʰew ?	ʃe(w)	tsʰew
179	to see	*nu(k)		
186	skinny	*kʰele		
187	sky	*alpa		
188	sleep	*han-		
190	smoke	*mus	-mut	mus
192	to snore	*-hol-		
194	to sow, plant	*sin-		
195	to speak	*wele		
196	spider	*kolok	korok	kolok
201	stone	*pe(h)	pe	pe
202	summer	*ȼʰikin	čikin-	tsikin
203	sun	*loȼʼak	ločak	lotsʼak
204	tail	*sokʼ	čok	sokʼ
207	there is/are not (Sp.: no hay)	*kuwa		
210	thorn	*ham ?		
212	to tie	*ȼupa-	čuba	tsupa
215	tongue	*pelam		
216	tooth	*wis		
217	tree	*yo(h)	jo	jo
220	two	*matʼɨ	mata	matʼa
221	uncle	*kokʰam ?		
224	wasp	*petʰel	peten	petʰel
225	water	*sɨ(tʰ)	-čɨ	-sɨ
226	we	*-kup	-kuk	-kup
228	white	*pʰe(kʰ)	pʰe	pʰe
229	wind	*lɨpʰɨ(kʰ)	lɨbɨ-	lɨpʰɨ
230	woman	*kep	kek	kep
233	word	*wele		
235	worm, caterpillar	*ȼʼihih	čih	tsʼih-
237	yellow	*lu(pʰ)		
239	you	*hip	ik	hip
