= Walter Tróchez =

Honduran LGBT activist (1982–2009)

Walter Orlando Tróchez (1982-13 December 2009) was a Honduran political activist and LGBT rights leader who was murdered in Tegucigalpa.

Another visible LGBT Honduran activist and Zelayista, Erick Martínez Ávila, was murdered on 7 May 2012 in the outskirts of Tegucigalpa.

== Impunity ==
A Honduran rights group said Walter Tróchez was briefly kidnapped 4 December 2009 by four masked men who beat him before he managed to escape. He filed a complaint to national and international authorities.

The assailants threatened to kill Tróchez because of his participation in the anti-coup movement, the International Observatory on the Human Rights Situation said. He was also a gay rights activist.

== Death ==
On 13 December 2009, Walter Tróchez was shot as he walked in downtown Tegucigalpa. Friends rushed him to a hospital, where he died.

== Reactions ==
In a statement, the National Resistance Front said, "Tróchez was an active militant in the resistance and an example of the fight against the dictatorship."

Amnesty International reacted to the news of Walter Tróchez's death by demanding urgent and independent inquiry into the matter.

On January 26 and 27 2010, several vigils and demos were organised in Berlin, San Francisco, Los Angeles, in solidarity with Gay Hondurans and for democracy.

== See also ==
- 2009 Honduran coup d'état
