= Chamelecón =

- Location within Honduras
- Coordinates: 15°23′0″N 88°1′0″W
- Country: Honduras
- Department: Cortés

Chamelecón is a suburb of San Pedro Sula in Honduras. Chamelecón is ten minutes' drive south from San Pedro Sula. It has an approximate population of 53,400.

It came to world attention on 23 December 2004 when 28 people were murdered and another 28 injured while returning from the centre of San Pedro Sula by the MS-13 gang opposed to the (proposed) restoration of the death penalty in Honduras. Many of the residents of this poor suburb work in textile manufacturing.

== History ==
In prehispanic times, Chamelecón was inhabited by Nahuas, likely related to the Pipil of El Salvador.

== See also ==
- Crime in Honduras
