= Tol language =

Jicaquean language

Tol
- (Eastern) Jicaque, Jicaque de la Flor
- Tolpan
- Native to: Honduras
- Region: Francisco Morazán Department
- Ethnicity: 19,600 Tolupan (1990)
- Native speakers: almost 500 (2012)
- Language family: Hokan ?: Jicaquean; Tol
- Writing system: Latin

Language codes
- ISO 639-3: jic
- Glottolog: toll1241
- ELP: Tol
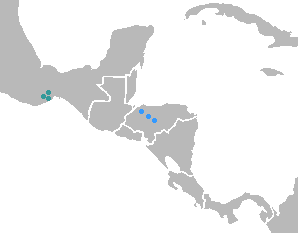
- Map of Jicaquean and Tequistlatecan languages

Tol (Tolpan), also known as Eastern Jicaque, Tolupan, and Torupan, is spoken by approximately 500 Tolupan people in La Montaña de la Flor reservation in Francisco Morazán Department, Honduras.

== Name ==
Tol speakers refer to themselves as the Tolpán, but are called Jicaques or Turrupanes by Ladinos.

== Former extent ==
Tol was also spoken in much of Yoro Department, but only a few speakers were reported in the Yoro Valley in 1974.

Tol used to be spoken from the Río Ulúa in the west, to modern-day Trujillo in the east, and to the Río Sulaco in the inland south. This area included the areas around modern-day El Progreso, La Ceiba, and possibly also San Pedro Sula. Most Tolupan had fled the Spanish from coastal regions by the early 1800s. The Tol speakers at La Montaña de la Flor fled the Yoro Valley in 1865 to avoid being conscripted into forced labor by the local governor (Campbell & Oltrogge 1980:206, Hagen 1943, Chapman 1978).

== Phonology ==
=== Consonants ===
Consonants
		Bilabial	Alveolar	Palatal		Velar	Glottal
Plosive/ Affricate	plain	p	t	t͡ɕ		k	ʔ
Plosive/ Affricate	aspirated	pʰ	tʰ	t͡ɕʰ		kʰ	ʔ
Plosive/ Affricate	ejective	pʼ	tʼ	t͡ɕʼ		kʼ	ʔ
Fricative		β	s				h
Nasal		m	n			ŋ	
Lateral			l				
Semivowel		w		j	j̈		

=== Vowels ===
Vowels
	Front	Central	Back
Close	i	ɨ	u
Mid	e		o
Open		a	

== Orthography ==
The Tol alphabet is as follows:

A a, C c, Cj cj, C' c', E e, I i, J j, L l, M m, N n, O o, P p, Pj pj, P' p', Q q, Qj qj, S s, T t, Tj tj, T' t', Ts ts, Tsj tsj, Ts' ts', U u, Ü ü, V v, W w, Y y, '.

Spanish loanwords use the following letters:

B b, D d, G g, F f, H h, Ll ll, Ñ ñ, R r, Rr rr, Z z.

== Grammar ==
The following overview is based on Haurholm-Larsen (2014).

=== Constituent order ===
The basic constituent order of Tol is SOV and the language displays a consistently head final order of constituents, i.e. verbs follow the subject and the object, there are postpositions instead of prepositions, and subordinating conjunctions appear at the end of subordinate clauses.

=== Inflection ===
Verbs and nouns are inflected for person, number and, in the case of verbs, tense, using a number of different morpho-syntactic means which often conflate various meanings (polyexponentiality). These means include, prefixing, suffixing and infixing, ablaut and stress shift and the use of independent pronouns. Tense is also expressed by the use of particles. Number is only marked in noun phrases with animate referents. Some examples are given below.

m-wayúm 'my husband'
w-y-ayúm 'your husband'
woyúm 'her husband'
kʰis wayúm 'our husband'
his wayúm 'your husband'
his wayúm 'their husband'

napʰ üsü müˀüs 'I am drinking water'
hipʰ üsü müs 'you are drinking water'
hupʰ üsü mü 'he is drinking water'
kupʰ üsü miskʰékʰ 'we are drinking water'
nun üsü müskʰé 'you are drinking water'
yupʰ üsü miˀün 'they are drinking water'

Most nouns take one of three suffixes: -(sV)s, -(V)N, -(V)kʰ.

Examples:

wo-sís 'house' (root: wa)
sitʰ-ím 'avocado' (root: sitʰ)
kʰon-íkʰ 'bed' (root: kʰan)

Nouns that never take suffixes refer to body parts and kinship terms.
