= Tolupan =

Tolupan Jicaque
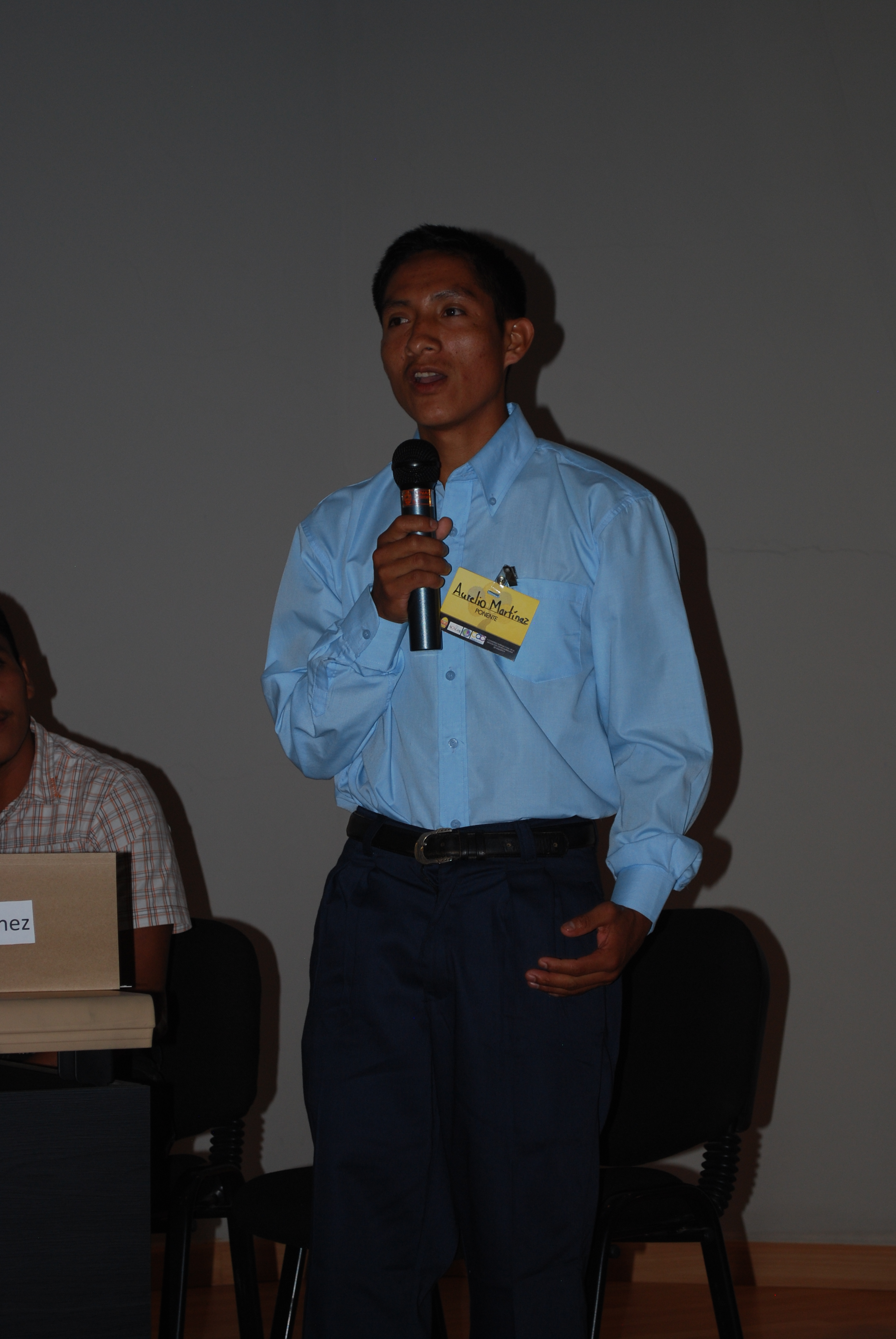

Total population
- 8,600-19,000

Regions with significant populations
- Honduras

Languages
- Jicaque

Religion
- traditional tribal religion, Roman Catholicism

The Tolupan or Jicaque people are an Indigenous ethnic group of Honduras, primarily inhabiting the northwest coast of Honduras and the community Montaña de La Flor in central Honduras.

== Culture ==
The Jicaque or Tolupan are an agrarian people, who raise beans, maize, and sweet and bitter manioc. They also fish, hunt, and raise livestock. They are polygamous. Culturally, they are similar to the Miskito and Sumo people.

== History ==
In the 19th century, a Roman Catholic missionary, Manuel Jesús de Subirian, encouraged many Jicaque to assimilate into mainstream culture, settle in villages, and grow maize. The other Jicaque who maintained their traditional lifeways lived in Montaña de la Flor, and ultimately the Honduran government granted them a 760-hectare reservation.

== Synonymy ==
The Jicaque are also called the Cicaque, Hicaque, Ikake, Taguaca, Taupane, Tol, Tolpan, Torrupan, or Xicaque people.

== Honors ==
Rhadinella tolpanorum, a snake species native to Honduras, is named in honor of the Tolupan people.
