= Anna M. Quider =

American astronomer and science lobbyist

Anna M. Quider is an American astronomer and science lobbyist. Formerly the Assistant Vice President for Federal Relations at Northern Illinois University, she remains affiliated with Northern Illinois University as a senior research fellow, and heads the consulting firm The Quider Group. She serves on the Board of Directors of the Association of Marshall Scholars and the Board of Visitors of the University of Pittsburgh Honors College. Quider is also a past chair of the Forum on Physics and Society of the American Physical Society and a past president of The Science Coalition. One of her notable contributions to US science policy is spearheading the creation of the 'emerging research institution' (ERI) federal designation for higher education institutions which became law in the CHIPS and Science Act. Several federal research agencies developed and implemented grant programs for ERIs and conduct reporting on grantmaking to ERIs as a result of Quider's efforts.

== Education and career ==
Quider is from Buffalo, New York, where her father was a local politician and later a civil servant and her mother was a Buffalo Public Schools special education teacher. She went to Grand Island Senior High School (New York) where she was valedictorian and senior prom queen for the class of 2002. She earned a gold medal in the Western New York Regional Science Fair in 2001.

Quider was an undergraduate at the University of Pittsburgh on a Chancellor's Scholarship, graduating in 2007 with a B.S. with Honors in physics & astronomy and a B.A. with a double major in religious studies and history and philosophy of science. As an undergraduate, she was the inaugural recipient of the Chambliss Astronomy Achievement Student Award of the American Astronomical Society, recipient of the Barry M. Goldwater Scholarship, and recipient of the Bloomfield Memorial Award of the Society of Physics Students. Her undergraduate research on quasar absorption lines and galaxy formation was supervised by David Turnshek and Sandhya Rao of the University of Pittsburgh Department of Physics and Astronomy.

Quider earned a Ph.D. in astronomy from the University of Cambridge as a member of Churchill College, Cambridge and Institute of Astronomy, Cambridge where her studies were supported as a UK-funded Marshall Scholar, a recipient of the US-funded NSF Graduate Research Fellowship Program, and a Cambridge Overseas Trust (now called Cambridge Commonwealth Trust) Scholar. Her dissertation, High redshift star-forming galaxies in absorption and emission, was supervised by Max Pettini.

Quider is a spectroscopist who has authored or co-authored a total of 11 peer-reviewed astrophysics journal articles on the spectra and properties of high-redshift galaxies and quasars which collectively have been cited over 1,000 times in the scientific literature. She was Principal Investigator on a funded Hubble Space Telescope observing proposal. She has used several research-grade telescopes including W.M. Keck Observatory, 2.1 m Telescope and WIYN Telescope at Kitt Peak National Observatory, Hobby–Eberly Telescope, Very Large Telescope, Sloan Digital Sky Survey, and the Hubble Space Telescope.

She writes that "About halfway through [graduate school] I realized I didn’t want the traditional academic career". Instead, she became an American Physical Society Congressional Science Fellow, working with Missouri representative Russ Carnahan. In 2012 she received an American Association for the Advancement of Science (AAAS) Science & Technology Policy Fellowship to serve as a program officer in the Office of Science and Technology Cooperation of the United States Department of State where she managed the Global Innovation through Science and Technology initiative. She became federal relations director at Northern Illinois University in 2014.

== Recognition ==
Quider was named a Fellow of the American Physical Society (APS) in 2021, after a nomination from the APS Forum on Physics and Society, "for stellar leadership in science policy and advocacy, and for promoting and mentoring early-career physicists".

In 2022, the Association of Public and Land-grant Universities gave her their Jennifer Poulakidas Outstanding Achievement Award, and the National Institute for Lobbying & Ethics named her as one of 100 Top Lobbyists in the United States for the year.
