= CubbySpot =

Canadian technology company

CubbySpot Inc.
- Company type: Private
- Founded: February 25, 2015; 11 years ago
- Headquarters: Toronto, Ontario, {{{location_country}}}
- Founders: Regnard Raquedan, Liza Ong
- CEO: Regnard Raquedan
- Industry: Mobile Applications, Web Applications
- Website: www.cubbyspot.com
- Commercial: Yes
- Current status: Active

CubbySpot is a privately held Canadian technology company based in Toronto, Ontario that developed an online marketplace that matches parents and child care centers to fill available open spots.

The company was founded by Regnard Raquedan and Liza Ong.

== History ==
Regnard Raquedan joined The Founder Institute Toronto Winter 2014 cohort and the company was incorporated on February 25, 2015 as part of the program requirements.

A few weeks after graduation from the program, Raquedan, who represented CubbySpot, was selected as a Semi-finalist at the 2015 GIST Tech-I competition, a global competition of scientific & technology innovations sponsored by the U.S. Department of State.

In June 2015, CubbySpot reached the finals of the Startup stage of the Tech-I competition. Raquedan presented at the 2015 Global Entrepreneurship Summit in Nairobi, Kenya in July 2015 as part of being a finalist.

In August 2015, the beta version of the CubbySpot mobile app and website was made available to the public through the company's websites. Through requesting invitations, interested potential users would get access to the pre-release versions.

The first version of the CubbySpot mobile app was released on the App Store and Google Play on October 18, 2015.

CubbySpot was featured in the Business News Network show The Disruptors on April 21, 2016.

== Application ==
The CubbySpot mobile app is a marketplace that connects parents and daycares. Parents are able to locate the caregivers for their children, while daycares are able to advertise available spots in their centers.

Parents who are looking for child care centers access CubbySpot through the mobile device app, while daycare administrators who are looking to fill their openings and manage waiting lists access CubbySpot through the website interface.

In an interview, Raquedan shared that he envisions the app would be one that parents would eventually use to find "classes, summer camps, etc."
