= Global Innovation through Science and Technology initiative =

The Global Innovation through Science and Technology initiative (GIST) is a U.S. government program on innovation and entrepreneurship. The program assists business people in establishing startups. GIST participants in 135 emerging economies can develop skills, build networks, find mentors, and access financing through a combination of in-country training, a pitch competition, interactive online programming, and direct connections to U.S. experts. GIST helps create conditions for successful local entrepreneurship ecosystems and enables global youth to develop local solutions to local problems. GIST is also one of the key programs under President Obama's SPARK Initiative, an initiative under which programs are selected to represent the best work being done by the U.S. Government to advance entrepreneurship around the world.

Since 2011, GIST has engaged more than 2.8 million innovators and entrepreneurs worldwide and mentored over 5,000 startups that have generated more than $110 million in revenue. GIST is a partnership led by the U.S. Department of State, Bureau of Oceans and International Environmental and Scientific Affairs, with the implementation of programs by Venturewell and the American Association for the Advancement of Science (AAAS).

== Launch ==
The GIST programs were announced at the 2011 conference on Economic Development through Science and Technology Innovation in Rabat, Morocco attended by U.S. Assistant Secretary of State for Oceans and International Environmental and Scientific Affairs Dr. Kerri-Ann Jones. This conference was the third and final consultative meeting to develop high-impact engagement opportunities. Previous meetings were held in Alexandria, Egypt and Kuala Lumpur, Malaysia. The GIST initiative exemplifies a science and technology innovation partnership that U.S. President Barack Obama called for in a 2009 speech at Cairo University.

== GIST Tech-I Global Pitch Competition ==
The first Tech-I competition occurred in 2011 in Istanbul, Turkey. Notable Tech-I finalists have included Nermin Sa'd, founder of Hanadisayat.net from Jordan; and Natali Ardianto, founder and CTO of Tiket.com from Indonesia.

The Tech-I Competition of the GIST initiative is implemented by the American Association for the Advancement of Science (AAAS).
