= Monica Medina =

American lawyer and environmental activist (born 1962)

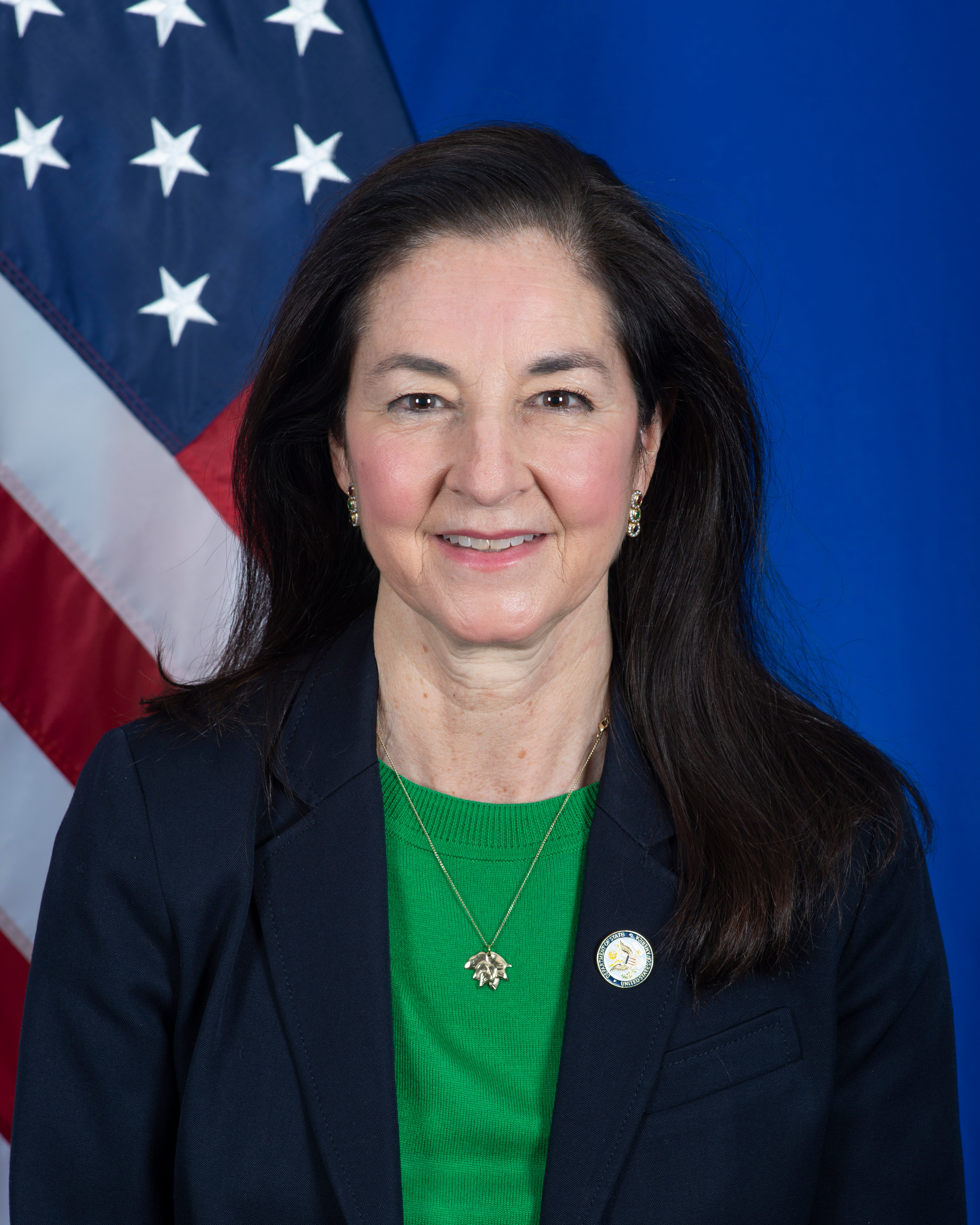

15th Assistant Secretary of State for Oceans and International Environmental and Scientific Affairs
- In office September 28, 2021 – April 28, 2023
- President: Joe Biden
- Preceded by: Kerri-Ann Jones (2014)
- Succeeded by: Wesley Brooks (2026)

Personal details
- Born: 1962 (age 63–64)
- Spouse: Ron Klain
- Children: 3
- Education: Georgetown University (BA); Columbia University (JD)

Military service
- Branch/service: United States Army

Monica P. Medina (born 1962) is an American attorney and government official who previously served as the Assistant Secretary of State for Oceans and International Environmental and Scientific Affairs at the Department of State. Medina served as Principal Deputy Undersecretary of Commerce for Oceans and Atmosphere, deputy associate attorney general, and general counsel of National Oceanic and Atmospheric Administration. She was also the U.S. Commissioner to the International Whaling Commission. She briefly served as president and CEO of the Wildlife Conservation Society.

== Early life and education ==
Medina received an Army Reserve Officers' Training Corps scholarship in 1979 and earned a Bachelor of Arts degree from Georgetown University. She received her Juris Doctor with honors from Columbia Law School.

== Career ==
Medina began her career in the office of the general counsel of the Army, where she served on active duty in the United States Army.

=== Capitol Hill ===
From 1989 to 1992, she served as senior counsel to the United States Senate Committee on Environment and Public Works.

=== Clinton administration ===
In 1992, she was appointed by Janet Reno to serve as deputy associate attorney general at the United States Department of Justice, with oversight of the Environment Division. Medina was later appointed to serve as general counsel of NOAA from 1997 to 1999. As general counsel of NOAA, Medina represented the United States in several international negotiations, and argued and won significant cases before the United States courts of appeals.

=== 2000–2008 ===
Medina served as a senior officer in the Pew Environment Group, where she provided advice and assistance on issues of marine law and policy. Medina also worked in the U.S. Office of the International Fund for Animal Welfare and spent a number of years as a partner at the law firm of Heller Ehrman, with a practice focused on environmental law, corporate law, and biotechnology matters. Medina served on the presidential transition team of Barack Obama.

=== Obama administration ===
In the Obama administration, Medina served as principal deputy undersecretary for oceans and atmosphere of the National Oceanic and Atmospheric Administration. Medina also served as the U.S. Commissioner to the International Whaling Commission. Medina led efforts on Arctic conservation, restoration of the Gulf of Mexico after the Deepwater Horizon oil spill, conservation of endangered species, and fisheries management and enforcement.

Medina later served as special assistant to United States Secretary of Defense Leon Panetta, where she played a role in eliminating discrimination against women in the military and in addressing military sexual assault. Medina also drafted the rule overturning the ban on women from “combat” positions strictly because of their gender. Medina later served as a member of the Defense Department Advisory Committee on Women in the Services.

=== 2013–present ===
Medina currently runs Our Daily Planet, an email newsletter about climate change and the environment. Previously she served as deputy director of the environment program at the Walton Family Foundation and an adjunct professor in the School of Foreign Service at Georgetown University. Prior to joining the Walton Family Foundation she served as the senior director of ocean policy at the National Geographic Society. Medina is also a board member of the Service Women's Action Network and the Georgetown Sustainable Oceans Alliance board.

Medina has written opinion columns for The New York Times, HuffPost, The Hill, and USA Today. Medina frequently writes about environmental policy, and has authored columns supportive of the Green New Deal. Medina has appeared on MSNBC, CNN, CGTN America, and NPR.

In April 2021, Medina was nominated to serve as an Assistant Secretary of State for the Bureau of Oceans and International Environmental and Scientific Affairs in the Biden administration. Her nomination was reported favorably by the Senate's Foreign Relations Committee on August 4, 2021. Medina was officially confirmed by the entire Senate on September 28, 2021, by a vote of 61–36.

In June 2023, Media was named president and CEO of the Wildlife Conservation Society; she left this position in March 2024.

== Awards ==
For her service in the Army, Medina was awarded a Commendation Medal in 1989 and a Meritorious Service Medal in 1990. In 2013, Secretary of Defense Leon Panetta awarded Medina the Department of Defense Distinguished Service Medal.

== Personal life ==
Medina is married to Ron Klain, the former chief of staff to President Joe Biden. Klain is a former chief of staff to two U.S. vice presidents and the former United States Ebola response coordinator. Medina and Klain met as undergraduates at Georgetown. They have three children.

== In popular culture ==
Medina was portrayed in the 2008 HBO film Recount by actress Eve Gordon, referenced in the credits as Monica Klain. The film depicts the weeks following the 2000 United States presidential election recount in Florida, of which her husband Ron Klain (played by Kevin Spacey) was a significant participant.
