= Eileen Claussen =

American environmentalist (born 1945)

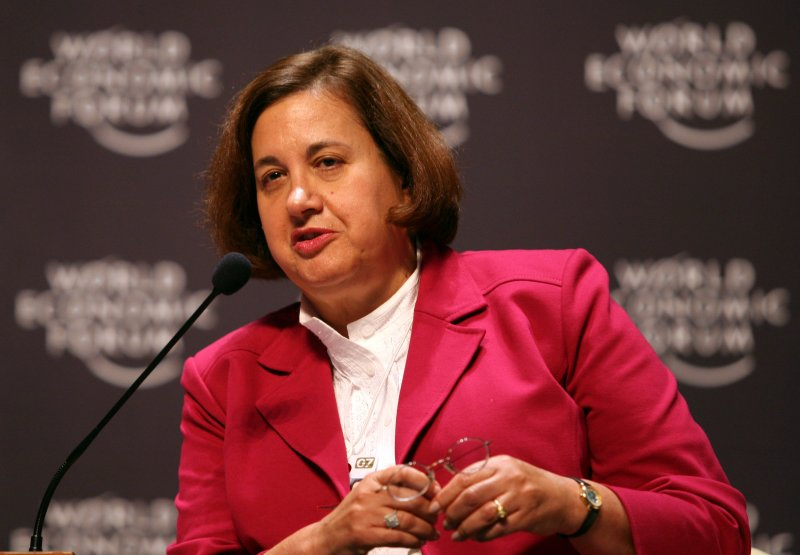
- Eileen Claussen

10th Assistant Secretary of State for Oceans and International Environmental and Scientific Affairs
- In office January 29, 1997 – July 18, 1997
- Preceded by: Elinor G. Constable
- Succeeded by: David B. Sandalow

Personal details
- Born: 1945 (age 80–81)
- Education: George Washington University (BA); University of Virginia (MA)

Eileen B. Claussen (born 1945) is an American climate and energy policy administrator, diplomat, and lobbyist. She held senior posts at the U.S. Department of State, National Security Council, and Environmental Protection Agency before founding the Pew Center on Global Climate Change in 1998. She then launched the center's successor organization, the Center for Climate and Energy Solutions (C2ES), in 2011, and retired as president of C2ES in 2014.

== Education and early career ==
Claussen grew up in South Africa, where she developed an interest in the environment and the natural landscape. She received her Bachelor of Arts from George Washington University, and her Master of Arts in English from the University of Virginia. She began her career with positions at Booz Allen Hamilton, Boise Cascade, and the United States Department of Defense. She then joined the Environmental Protection Agency, where she served as the Director of the office of Solid Waste Characterization and Assessment Division and the Deputy Assistant Administrator for Air and Radiation.

== Director of the Office of Atmospheric Programs ==
Between 1987 and 1993, Claussen was Director of the Office of Atmospheric Programs for the United States Environmental Protection Agency (EPA). She was responsible for activities related to the depletion of the ozone layer; Title IV of the Clean Air Act; and the EPA's energy efficiency programs, including the Green Lights program and the Energy Star program. Claussen was instrumental in negotiating and implementing the Montreal Protocol which curbed the production of CFCs and other toxic chemicals. Norma M. Riccucci argues that Claussen was extremely effective in the Montreal Protocol negotiations "because of her open, frank, and trustworthy style."

Claussen was credited as being an outstanding representative of the United States in international negotiations. Liz Cook of Friends of the Earth argued that Claussen was a good representative for the United States because she was seen as less "arrogant" in negotiations than other U.S. representatives. She also achieved real success in working with industry on the Montreal Protocol, and was credited by industry officials as being "credible, scrupulous, attentive to the concerns of industry, and reasonable in dealing with these concerns."

== Clinton administration ==
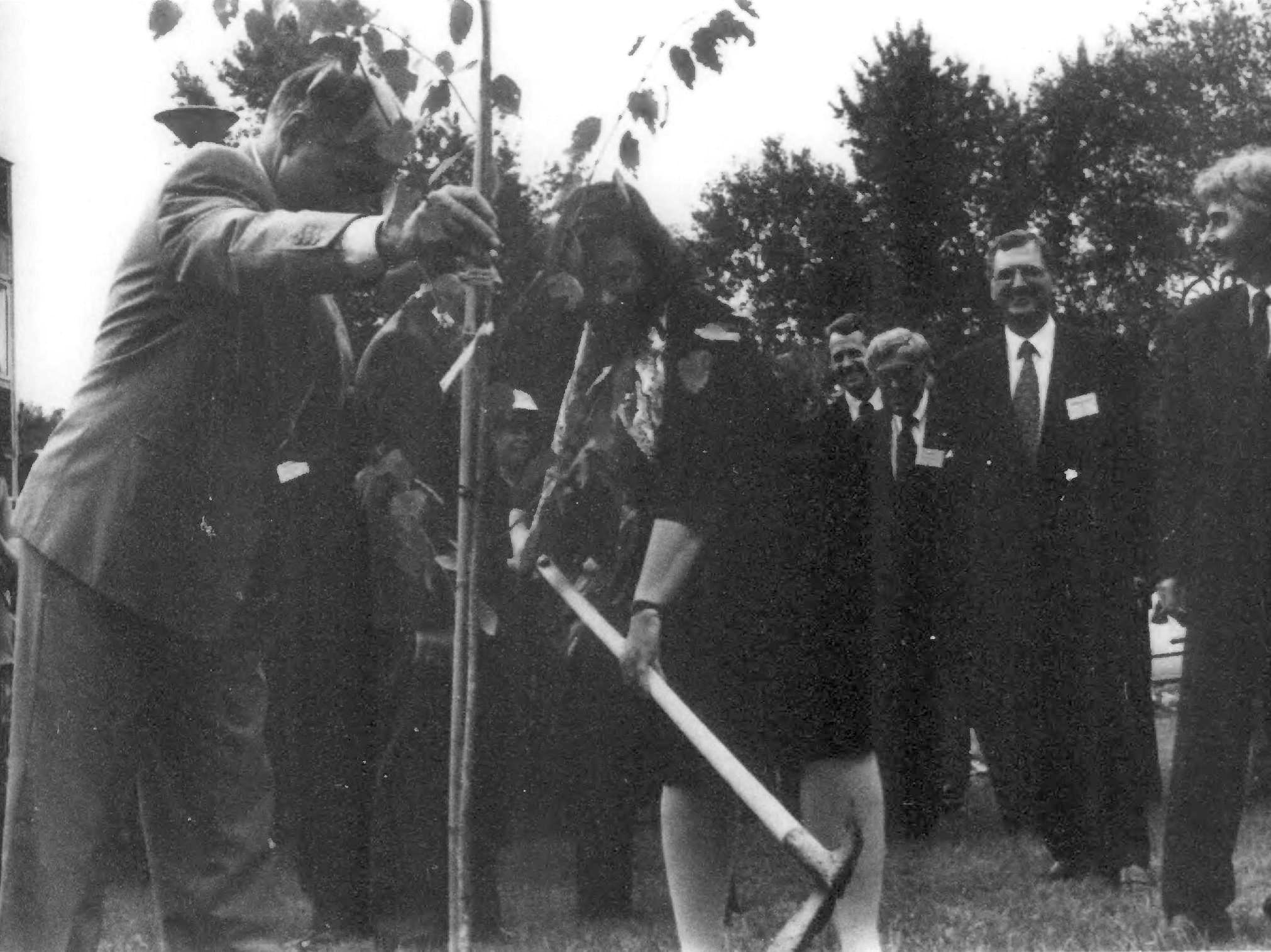
Assistant Secretary Claussen planting a tree in Budapest, July 1996

Between 1993 and 1996, Claussen served as a Special Assistant to the President and Senior Director for Global Environmental Affairs at the National Security Council.

From 1996 to 1998, Claussen served as Assistant Secretary of State for Oceans and International Environmental and Scientific Affairs. She coordinated U.S. policy on the global environment on such issues as global warming, biodiversity, forest management, oceans, desertification, and trade and the environment, as well as on the environmental and sustainable development efforts of the multilateral banks and the United Nations. She served as an adviser to the President and the Secretary of State, and represented the Department of State in international negotiations.

== Pew Center on Global Climate Change ==
In 1998, Claussen founded the Pew Center on Global Climate Change, a non-profit organization dedicated to providing credible information and developing innovative solutions in the effort to address global climate change. Under Claussen's direction, the Pew Center has produced nearly 100 peer-reviewed reports and a broad collection of white papers and briefs by noted climate experts covering a range of critical topics including economics, environmental impacts, policy, science, business, technology and solutions. Claussen regularly testifies before the United States Congress and meets with other key stakeholders to share ideas for addressing climate change. She established the Pew Center's Business Environmental Leadership Council (BELC), which became the largest U.S.-based association of companies committed to advancing both policy and business solutions to climate change.

According to a 2001 profile in Green@Work magazine,

Her insistence on engaging and recognizing the influence of the private sector has earned Claussen a reputation of being somewhat of a maverick in the NGO community, but she says she is convinced that solutions that do not make economic sense will eventually follow the declining path of the oceans, ecosystems, species and natural resources the Pew Center is trying to protect. In fact, the joint statement of the BELC states, "We believe that the response must be cost-effective, global and equitable, and also allow for economic growth based on free market principles."

In November 2011, Claussen launched the Center for Climate and Energy Solutions (C2ES), the successor to the Pew Center on Global Climate Change. Bob Perciasepe, a former EPA deputy administrator, became C2ES president in August 2014.

== Later career ==
In 2015, Claussen was named Executive-in-Residence at the Martha and Spencer Love School of Business at Elon University.

== Honors ==
Claussen is a member of the Council on Foreign Relations, the Singapore Energy Advisory Committee, the Ecomagination Advisory Board, the Natural Gas Council, the Harvard Environmental Economics Program Advisory Panel, and the U.S. Commodity Future Trading Commission's Advisory Committee.

During her career, Claussen has been the recipient of numerous awards and honors, including the Fitzhugh Green Award for Outstanding Contributions to International Environmental Protection, the Meritorious Executive Award for Sustained Superior Accomplishment. She is the recipient of the Department of State's Career Achievement Award and the Distinguished Executive Award for Sustained Extraordinary Accomplishment. She also served as the Timothy Atkeson Scholar in Residence at Yale University.

Government offices
Preceded by Elinor G. Constable	Assistant Secretary of State for Oceans and International Environmental and Scientific Affairs; January 29, 1997 – July 18, 1997	Succeeded by David B. Sandalow
