= James L. Malone (diplomat) =

American lawyer (1931–1996)

5th Assistant Secretary of State for Oceans and International Environmental and Scientific Affairs
- In office June 1, 1981 – July 22, 1985
- Preceded by: Thomas R. Pickering
- Succeeded by: John Negroponte

Personal details
- Born: December 22, 1931 Los Angeles, California
- Died: September 10, 1996 (aged 64)
- Education: Pomona College (BA); Stanford University (JD)

James Louis Malone (December 22, 1931 – September 10, 1996) was an American lawyer who served as Assistant Secretary of State for Oceans and International Environmental and Scientific Affairs from 1981 to 1985.

== Biography ==
=== Early life ===
James Louis Malone was born in Los Angeles on December 22, 1931. He was educated at Pomona College, receiving a B.A. in 1953. He worked as an instructor at the United States Army Infantry School with the rank of First Lieutenant in the United States Army from May 1954 to March 1956. He then attended Stanford Law School, receiving his I.D. in 1959.

=== Career ===
Malone joined the faculty of the UCLA School of Law in 1961 as assistant dean and lecturer-in-law. He taught there until 1967, when he was hired as a dean at the Willamette University College of Law. He spent 1969 as a visiting professor at the University of Texas School of Law.

Malone was then the principal trial attorney of the United States Federal Maritime Commission 1970-71. From 1971 to 1973, he was Assistant General Counsel of the Arms Control and Disarmament Agency, and then its General Counsel from 1973 to 1976. In 1976, President of the United States Gerald Ford named Malone Ambassador and U.S. Representative to the Conference of the Committee on Disarmament. In 1978, he joined Doub & Muntzing, a law firm located in Washington, D.C.

In February 1981, President Ronald Reagan nominated Malone to be Assistant Secretary of State for Oceans and International Environmental and Scientific Affairs. After Senate confirmation, Malone held this office from June 1981 to July 1985.

=== Death ===
Malone died on September 10, 1996, at the age of 64.

Government offices
Preceded by Thomas R. Pickering	Assistant Secretary of State for Oceans and International Environmental and Scientific Affairs; June 1, 1981 – July 22, 1985	Succeeded by John Negroponte
