= David B. Sandalow =

American academic (born 1957)

David Sandalow
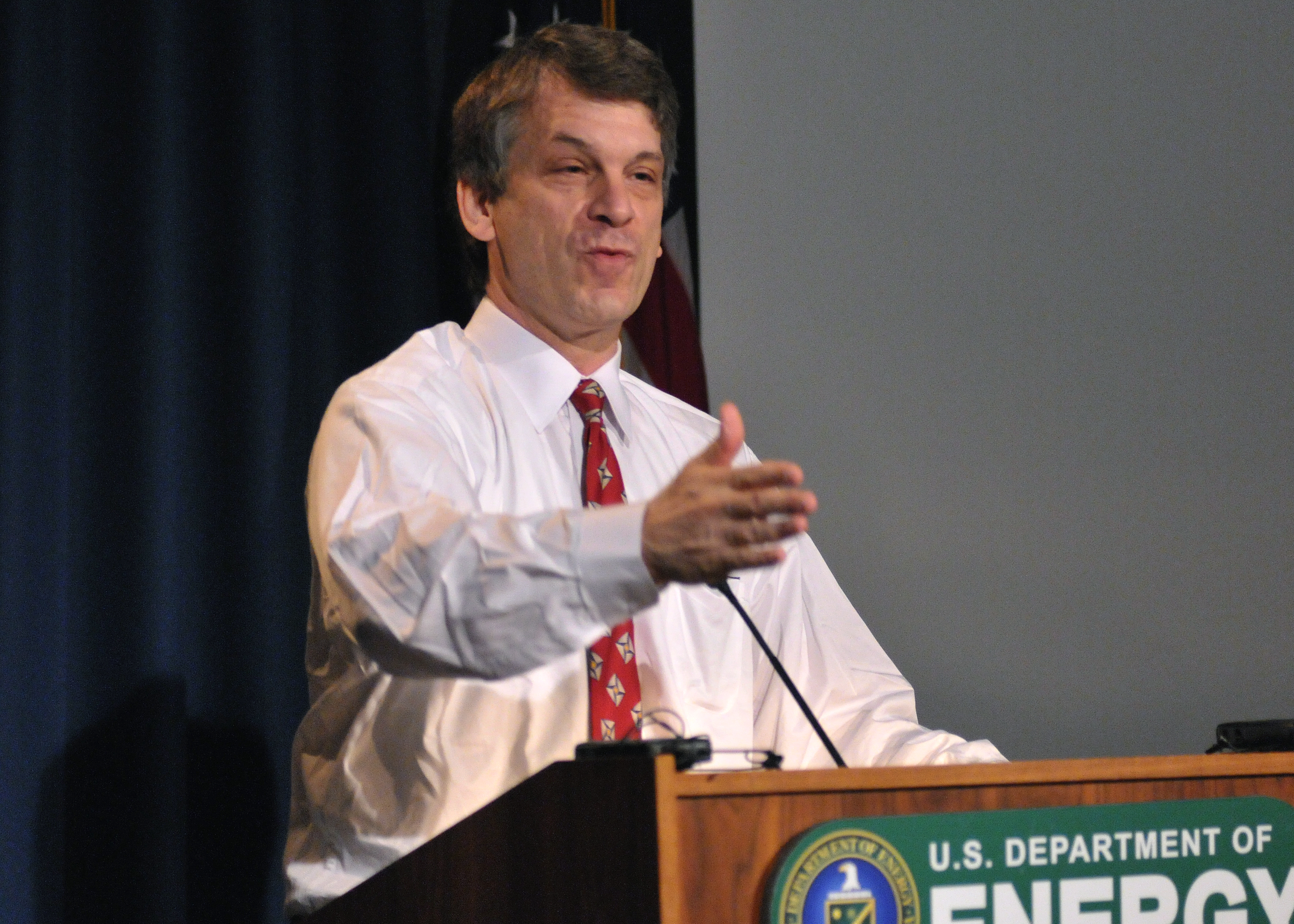

11th Assistant Secretary of State for Oceans and International Environmental and Scientific Affairs
- In office October 28, 1999 – January 19, 2001
- Preceded by: Eileen B. Claussen
- Succeeded by: John F. Turner

Personal details
- Born: 1957 (age 68–69)
- Education: Yale College (BA); University of Michigan (JD)

David Sandalow (born 1957), is the Inaugural Fellow at the Center on Global Energy Policy (CGEP) and Co-Director of the Energy and Environment Concentration at the School of International and Public Affairs at Columbia University. He is the lead author, most recently, of the Artificial Intelligence for Climate Change Mitigation Roadmap (December 2023) and Guide to Chinese Climate Policy (October 2022).

Sandalow serves as a director of Enagás, SA and Fermata Energy and as a senior advisor to BCG. He is a Distinguished Research Fellow at the Oxford Institute for Energy Studies and Distinguished Non-Resident Fellow at the Atlantic Council. Sandalow is a member of the Zayed Sustainability Prize Selection Committee, Electric Drive Transport Association’s “Hall of Fame” and Council on Foreign Relations. He is a graduate of the University of Michigan Law School and Yale College.

Government offices
Preceded by Eileen Claussen	Assistant Secretary of State for Oceans and International Environmental and Scientific Affairs; 1999–2001	Succeeded by John F. Turner
