= Bureau of Oceans and International Environmental and Scientific Affairs =

Bureau within the United States Department of State

- Seal of the United States Department of State

Bureau overview
- Formed: 1974; 52 years ago
- Jurisdiction: Executive branch of the United States
- Headquarters: Harry S. Truman Building, Washington, D.C., United States
- Bureau executives: Wesley R. Brooks, Assistant Secretary; John E. Thompson, Principal Deputy Assistant Secretary
- Website: Official website

The Bureau of Oceans and International Environmental and Scientific Affairs (OES) is a functional bureau within the United States Department of State. The Assistant Secretary of State for Oceans and International Environmental and Scientific Affairs coordinates United States foreign-policy work relating to space, oceans, polar affairs, fisheries, the environment, science, health, wildlife, conservation, and natural resources. The bureau reports to the Under Secretary of State for Economic Affairs.

== Overview ==
The bureau is headed by the Assistant Secretary of State for Oceans and International Environmental and Scientific Affairs. Wesley R. Brooks was sworn in as Assistant Secretary on May 28, 2026. Ruth L. Perry serves as Acting Principal Deputy Assistant Secretary.

The Oceans, Fisheries, and Polar Affairs' directorate has two offices dedicated to international oceans issues. The Office of Marine Conservation focuses on international fisheries matters and related problems, and the Office of Oceans and Polar Affairs has primary responsibility for international ocean law and policy, marine pollution, marine mammals, polar affairs, maritime boundaries, and marine science.

The Environment directorate deals with environmental issues, including environmental aspects of international trade and safeguarding hazardous materials requiring multilateral agreements within the Office of Environmental Quality and Transboundary Affairs. The Office of Conservation and Water develops U.S. foreign policy approaches to conserving and managing the world ecosystems and to transboundary water issues.

The Health, Space and Science directorate includes the Office of International Health Affairs which works with U.S. Government agencies to facilitate policy-making regarding international bioterrorism, infectious disease, surveillance and response, environmental health, and health in post-conflict situations. The Office of Space and Advanced Technology handles issues arising from our exploration of space to assure global security regarding this new frontier, and the Office of Science & Technology (S&T) Cooperation promotes the interests of the U.S. science and technology communities in the international policy arena, negotiates framework and other S&T agreements, manages the Department's Embassy Science fellows program, and takes a leading role in representing U.S. science and technology in multilateral international organizations, such as UNESCO and other UN organizations, APEC, OECD and others.

== History ==
The Department of State Appropriations Authorization Act became law in October 1973, which led to the establishment of the bureau in 1974. The new bureau assumed responsibility for the negotiation of international environmental and natural resource agreements and treaties with other states. The bureau was created by consolidating the duties of several offices.

- the Office of International Scientific and Technological Affairs;
- the Office of Special Assistant to the Secretary of Fisheries and Wildlife, and Coordinator of Ocean Affairs;
- the Office of the Special Assistant to the Secretary for Population Matters; and
- the Special Assistant to the Secretary for Environmental Affairs.

The bureau has been led by distinguished foreign service officers like Career Ambassador Thomas Pickering and Ambassador Judy Garber, as well as public servants like Ambassador (retired) John Negroponte.

== Diplomatic highlights ==
The bureau played a major role negotiating 14 multilateral fisheries treaties since the 1980s and the Vienna Convention for the Protection of the Ozone Layer and its annexes.

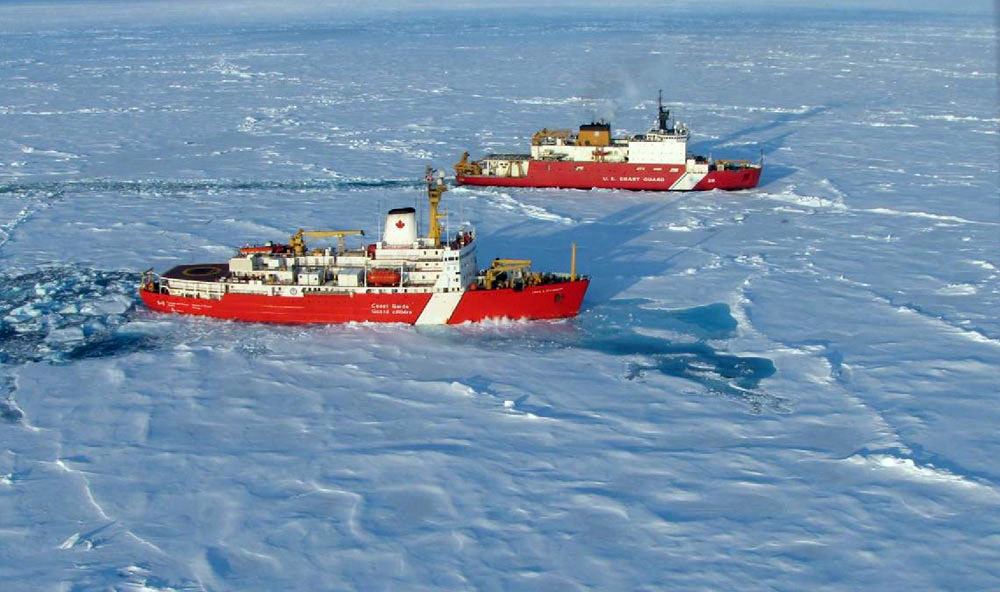
Views of the U.S.-Canada fourth joint mission to map the continental shelf in the Arctic Ocean in August and September 2011.

It played a significant role in the creation of the Arctic Council and facilitated its meetings until a permanent secretariat was established in. It helped organize the Our Ocean conference in June 2014 that continues to be held annually and helped bring the Agreement on Port State Measures into force into 2016.

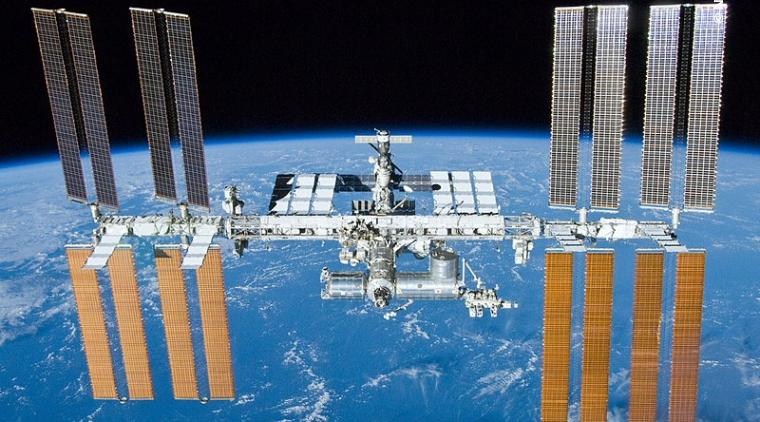
International Space Station

OES has negotiated more than 30 bilateral and multilateral science and technology agreements that promote sustainable development, women in science, and global security. OES and NASA worked together to negotiate intergovernmental agreements that govern the ownership and use of the International Space Station.
