= Elinor G. Constable =

American diplomat (1934–2022)

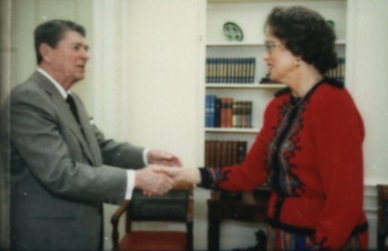
- President Ronald Reagan with Ambassador Elinor G. Constable (1987)

9th Assistant Secretary of State for Oceans and International Environmental and Scientific Affairs
- In office June 2, 1993 – September 15, 1995
- Preceded by: E. U. Curtis Bohlen
- Succeeded by: Eileen B. Claussen

Personal details
- Born: Elinor Jackson Greer; February 8, 1934 San Diego, California, U.S.
- Died: December 8, 2022 (aged 88)
- Education: Wellesley College

Elinor Greer Constable (February 8, 1934 – December 8, 2022) was an American diplomat who was one of the first women to have a distinguished career in the United States Foreign Service including serving as the United States Ambassador to Kenya (1986-1989) and Assistant Secretary of State for Oceans and International Environmental and Scientific Affairs (1993-1995).

== Early life ==
Constable was born Elinor Jackson Greer on February 8, 1934, in San Diego, California. Her father was Vice Admiral Marshall Raymond Greer, a decorated naval officer. Her mother was Katherine Sherburne French, a daughter of Francis Jackson French, one of the creators of French’s mustard. Because of her father’s postings, Constable lived in many locations while growing up, eventually graduating from Punahou School in Honolulu, Hawaii (1951) and Wellesley College (1955) where she majored in political science.

== Foreign Service career ==
After working in several short term positions, Constable entered the United States Department of State training program for career foreign service officers in 1957 where she met fellow foreign service trainee Peter Dalton Constable. She and Peter Constable were married in 1958 but Ms. Constable refused to immediately resign her foreign service position as was traditionally required of married women at the time. However, when she and Peter Constable started their family, she did resign from the foreign service and joined him in his overseas postings working in service and volunteer positions until she returned to her own foreign service career in 1973.

Important positions Constable held with the U.S. Department of State over the next 22 years included:

Deputy Director & then Director of the Office of Investment Affairs

Deputy Assistant Secretary for International Finance and Development

Senior Deputy Assistant Secretary for Economic and Business Affairs

United States Ambassador to Kenya

Assistant Secretary for Oceans and International Environmental and Scientific Affairs

Constable retired in the mid 1990s due to her husband’s deteriorating health.

She was a member of the American Academy of Diplomacy.

== Later life ==
After her retirement from the Department of State, Constable worked and volunteered in numerous service activities. She was predeceased by her husband Peter Dalton Constable (2000) and one of their sons, Philip Sherburne Constable (2014). Constable died on December 8, 2022, in Washington, D.C.

Government offices
Preceded by E. U. Curtis Bohlen	Assistant Secretary of State for Oceans and International Environmental and Scientific Affairs; June 2, 1993 – September 15, 1995	Succeeded by Eileen Claussen
Diplomatic posts
Preceded by Gerald Eustis Thomas	United States Ambassador to Kenya; 1986–1989	Succeeded by Smith Hempstone, Jr.
