= Marie-José Villiers =

Marie-José Villiers, Lady Villiers
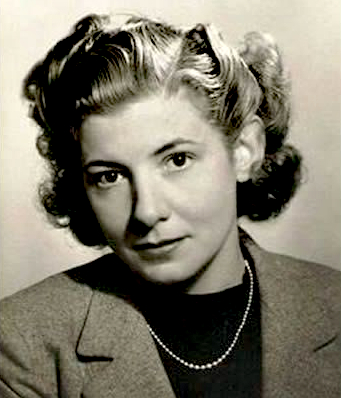
- Born: Countess Marie-José de la Barre d’Erquelinnes; 30 April 1916; Cuckfield, Sussex, UK
- Died: 1 February 2015 (aged 98); Ascot, Berkshire, UK

Marie-José Villiers, Lady Villiers (30 April 1916 – 1 February 2015) was a British-born Belgian countess, born Countess Marie-José de la Barre d’Erquelinnes. She worked as a British spy during World War II.

== Early life ==
Marie José de la Barre d’Erquelinnes was born on April 30, 1916, at Cuckfield, Sussex to Berthe du Parc-Locmaria and Count Henri de la Barre d’Erquelinnes (1885–1961), a politician in Belgium. Her mother was a First World War Belgian refugee and was living with relatives in the Siltzer family (who were involved in Lancashire textile manufacturing) at the time of her daughter's birth. Her father served with the British Army in Flanders. After the end of World War I, the family returned to Jurbise in Belgium from Calehill Park in Kent. Villiers was educated at home before attending the Convent of the Assumption at Mons, Belgium. She also attended a finishing school in Haywards Heath, Sussex. She was one of seven children, five boys and two girls.

== World War II ==
In 1938 Villiers and her older sister Béatrice joined the newly formed Motor Corps of the Belgian Red Cross. She was trained as an ambulance driver and mechanic and, after the German forces invaded Belgium, she accompanied the Corps on missions throughout the country. While helping to evacuate patients from hospitals, her vehicle was strafed by enemy fighters and two of her charges died.

After the occupation of Belgium in May 1940, Italian air force officers occupied her Villiers's family chateau Villiers joined the newly formed Resistance and gathered information on German aircraft at the nearby Chièvres airfield. Villiers became part of “Service Zero”, initially headed by Charles Woeste. She was trained to recognise all the different aircraft by their silhouettes and draw target maps by the Resistance. Her work was of great value to British intelligence, which needed to know the proportion of bombers to fighter planes at any given time. She extended her intelligence activity to cover several German airfields in Belgium and northern France, and recruited agents to help her. She gathered intelligence on Italian forces based at her home in Jurbise, and on the Germans at her maternal grandfather du Parc's château in Vlamertinghe, in Flanders.

She also helped downed Royal Air Force pilots and linked them to escape lines. Her Red Cross association was useful as cover, and she organised a canteen for the poor in Anderlecht, Brussels, which fed 20,000 people over the winter of 1941–2. By October 1942 Service Zero had been betrayed and many of its members, including Woeste, were arrested.

With her family already in Britain, Villiers went underground until December, using an assumed name with her blond hair dyed black, before sneaking through France, Andorra and Spain where she managed to get a British passport before flying to London from Portugal in March 1943.

In Britain, Villiers worked for Belgian Emergency Relief. In autumn 1944, she went to the American Delta Base in Marseille as a liaison officer in the Belgian army. She was demobilised in August 1945.

== After World War II ==
Villiers met her husband, Charles English Hyde Villiers, after a British friend asked her to look after him because he had fallen ill while staying at a hotel in Brussels. The couple married in 1946. They then took a four-month honeymoon, travelling through Africa in an old Chevrolet delivery van to research investment opportunities. The couple had two daughters together, Diana Villiers Negroponte and Anne Martin, in addition to Charles's sons from a previous marriage.

After her marriage, Villiers became friends with the Queen Elizabeth The Queen Mother.

Villiers trained as a school care worker and spent 20 years working in the East End of London.

In December 1979 she identified a parcel sent to her home from Belgium as a bomb sent by the Provisional IRA, due to her war time training. She smuggled her husband past picket lines and into buildings during the industrial disputes which broke out at British Steel under his chairmanship.

In 1988, she published Granny was a Spy, an account of her wartime exploits. She started the book with a quote from Julius Caesar "Hurum Gallorun fortissimae sune belgae" ( Of all the Gauls, the Belgae were the bravest).

== Death ==
Villiers died on 1 February 2015, in Ascot, Berkshire aged 98.

== Awards ==
For her wartime work, the Belgian government awarded her the Chevalier de l’Ordre de la Couronne with Palme, Croix de Guerre with Palme, Médaille de la Resistance, Médaille Commemorative de la Guerre 1940-45 and the Croix des Evades. The French government awarded her a Croix de Guerre. From the American government, she received the Bronze Star.
