= Diana Villiers Negroponte =

American lawyer and academic

Diana Mary Villiers Negroponte (born August 14, 1947) is an American trade lawyer, Global Fellow at the Woodrow Wilson International Center for Scholars, adjunct professor of international relations at the Elliot School of International Affairs at George Washington University, and author of several books. Her professional name is Diana Villiers Negroponte. She is the wife of John Negroponte, the former United States Deputy Secretary of State and former U.S. Director of National Intelligence.

== Biography ==
A descendant of Charles II's mistress Barbara Villiers, Duchess of Cleveland, and a great-great grandchild of George Villiers, 4th Earl of Clarendon, who served as Queen Victoria's three-time Foreign Secretary, she was born in London. Her father was Sir Charles Villiers, a merchant banker, who was the first director of the International Reconstruction Corporation and chairman of British Steel Corporation from 1974 until 1988; her mother was Sir Charles's second wife, the former Countess Marie Josée de la Barre d’Erquelinnes and wartime Belgian resistance fighter.

After studying law at The American University Washington College of Law, she practiced international trade law with Paul, Hastings, Janofsky & Walker. Later, she studied for a PhD at the Universidad Iberoamericana and Georgetown University. Her doctoral thesis became the basis for her first book, Seeking Peace in El Salvador: The Struggle to Reconstruct a Nation at the End of the Cold War (2001). The manuscript was translated into Spanish and published in El Salvador as En Busca de la Paz en El Salvador: La lucha por Reconstruir una Nación al Final de la Guerra Fría (2016). While writing, she participated in events at the Center for the Study of Diplomacy and taught the history of Latin America at Georgetown University and later at Fordham University.

Upon returning to Washington D.C., she joined the United States Institute of Peace and contributed to the drafting of its historical origins. From there, she was invited to join the international affairs department at the Brookings Institution, where she wrote about Central American migration and edited both The End of Nostalgia: Mexico Confronts the Challenges of Global Competition (2013) and New Directions in Brazilian Foreign Relations.

Her latest book, published in 2020, was written while she was a public policy scholar at the Woodrow Wilson International Center for Scholars. Master Negotiator: James A. Baker, III's Role at the End of the Cold War, analyzes the events that took place from 1988-1992, such as the 1989 Tiananmen Square protests and massacre, German reunification, the repelling of Saddam Hussein from Iraq, the Madrid Peace Conference, and the achievement of peace in Central America.

On a voluntary basis, Diana Negroponte has supported environmental projects in Honduras, micro-enterprise lending in the Philippines, and Habitat for Humanity home-building in Mexico City and New York as well as feeding homeless populations in Washington D.C.

She remains a trustee emeritus of Freedom House, emeritus board member of Habitat for Humanity's New York City chapter, chair of the Wilson Council at the Woodrow Wilson International Center for Scholars, and member of the Women's Foreign Policy Group and serves on the Advisory Board of the School of Global Policy & Strategy at University of California, San Diego.

She has appeared on CNN, NBC, C-SPAN Washington Journal, and PBS Newshour and has written articles for national periodicals. She currently publishes articles for the Global Europe Program at the Woodrow Wilson Center.

The Negropontes have five adopted children from Honduras: Marina, Alexandra, John, George and Sophia. They celebrate three grandchildren.
