= E. U. Curtis Bohlen =

American government official

8th Assistant Secretary of State for Oceans and International Environmental and Scientific Affairs
- In office June 27, 1990 – October 31, 1992
- Preceded by: Frederick M. Bernthal
- Succeeded by: Elinor G. Constable

Personal details
- Born: September 29, 1927 (age 98) Boston, Massachusetts, U.S.
- Education: Harvard College (BA)

E. U. Curtis "Buff" Bohlen (born September 29, 1927) was the president of the World Wildlife Fund from 1981 to 1990, and United States Assistant Secretary of State for Oceans and International Environmental and Scientific Affairs from 1990 to 1992.

== Biography ==
=== Early life ===
Buff Bohlen was born in Boston on September 29, 1927. He was educated at Harvard College, receiving a B.A. in 1951. After college, he served in the United States Army from 1952 to 1954.

Bohlen joined the United States Department of State in 1955. There, he served in Washington, D.C. as political analyst for east African affairs; second secretary and political officer for the United States Embassy in Cairo; desk officer for Afghanistan affairs; and economic officer at the U.S. Embassy in Kabul.

=== Career ===
Bohlen left the State Department in 1969 and joined the United States Department of the Interior as Assistant to United States Secretary of the Interior Wally Hickel, and then, from 1971, Rogers Morton. In 1977–78, he was a consultant to the Committee on Merchant Marine and Fisheries of the United States House of Representatives. From 1979 to 1981, he was a consultant to the World Wildlife Fund, and in 1981, he became president of the World Wildlife Fund.

In February 1990, President of the United States George H. W. Bush nominated Bohlen to be Assistant Secretary of State for Oceans and International Environmental and Scientific Affairs; after Senate confirmation, he held this office from June 1990 until October 1992.

Bohlen retired in 1992. He remained active in the activities of the Atlantic Salmon Federation, becoming a director of the organization in 1997. He played a role in the negotiations of that led to Greenland agreeing to close its commercial fishery in 2002.

== Sources ==
- Nomination of E.U. Curtis Bohlen To Be an Assistant Secretary of State, Feb. 20, 1990
- Induction into the Atlantic Salmon Federation Hall of Fame

Government offices
Preceded by Frederick M. Bernthal	Assistant Secretary of State for Oceans and International Environmental and Scientific Affairs; June 27, 1990 – October 31, 1992	Succeeded by Elinor G. Constable
