= Claudia A. McMurray =

American government official (born 1958)

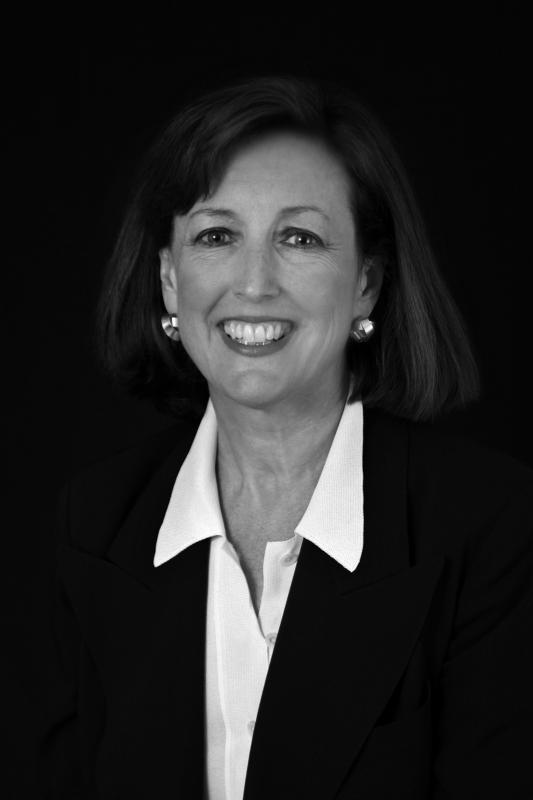

13th Assistant Secretary of State for Oceans and International Environmental and Scientific Affairs
- In office February 21, 2006 – January 20, 2009
- President: George W. Bush
- Preceded by: John F. Turner
- Succeeded by: Kerri-Ann Jones

Personal details
- Born: 1958 (age 67–68)
- Education: Georgetown University Law Center

Claudia A. McMurray (born 1958) was United States Assistant Secretary of State for Oceans and International Environmental and Scientific Affairs from 2006 to 2009.

== Biography ==
Claudia A. McMurray was educated at Smith College, receiving an A.B. in government in 1980. She then attended Georgetown University Law Center, receiving a J.D. While a law student, she worked in the Office of the White House Counsel.

After law school, McMurray worked at Patton Boggs and then Kirkland & Ellis. From 1989 to 1991, she was legislative counsel for Sen. John Warner (R—VA). From 1991 to 1995, she was Republican Counsel to the United States Senate Committee on Environment and Public Works. She was then general counsel to Sen. Fred Thompson (R—TN) from 1995 to 1996. In 1998, she joined Van Scoyoc Associates and worked there until 2000.

From August 2001 to 2003, she was Associate Deputy Administrator and Chief of Staff to the Deputy Administrator of the United States Environmental Protection Agency. She was then Deputy Assistant Secretary of State for Environment from 2003 to 2006.

In early 2006, President of the United States George W. Bush nominated McMurray to be Assistant Secretary of State for Oceans and International Environmental and Scientific Affairs and, after Senate confirmation, she held this office from February 2006 until January 2009.

She is currently Senior Counsellor with The Prince of Wales' International Sustainability Unit.

Government offices
Preceded by John F. Turner	Assistant Secretary of State for Oceans and International Environmental and Scientific Affairs; February 21, 2006 – January 20, 2009	Succeeded by Kerri-Ann Jones
