= Frederick M. Bernthal =

American government official

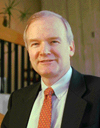
- Bernthal c. 2004

7th Assistant Secretary of State for Oceans and International Environmental and Scientific Affairs
- In office May 24, 1988 – March 16, 1990
- Preceded by: John Negroponte
- Succeeded by: E. U. Curtis Bohlen

Personal details
- Born: 1943 (age 82–83) Sheridan, Wyoming, U.S.
- Education: Valparaiso University (BS); University of California, Berkeley (PhD)

Frederick M. Bernthal (born 1943) was United States Assistant Secretary of State for Oceans and International Environmental and Scientific Affairs from 1988 to 1990.

== Biography ==
Frederick M. Bernthal was born in Sheridan, Wyoming on January 10, 1943. He was educated at Valparaiso University, receiving a B.S. in chemistry in 1964. He worked at the Argonne National Laboratory in 1964, and then did graduate research at Lawrence Berkeley National Laboratory at the University of California, Berkeley, receiving a Ph.D. in chemistry in 1969. He then did postdoctoral research at Yale University in 1969–70.

Bernthal spent 1970 to 1975 as an assistant professor at Michigan State University. He was promoted to associate professor of chemistry and physics in 1975 and taught at Michigan State University until 1978.

In 1978, Bernthal became a legislative assistant to Sen. Howard Baker (R—Tenn.). From 1980 to 1983, he was Senator Baker's chief legislative assistant. In 1983, he was appointed to the Nuclear Regulatory Commission, serving there until 1985.

In 1988, President of the United States Ronald Reagan nominated Bernthal as Assistant Secretary of State for Oceans and International Environmental and Scientific Affairs and after Senate confirmation, he held that office until 1990.

In 1990, President George H. W. Bush named Bernthal Deputy Director of the National Science Foundation. He served there until 1994, when he became president of the Universities Research Association. He served on the board of Society for Science & the Public from 2000 to 2008.

Government offices
Preceded by John Negroponte	Assistant Secretary of State for Oceans and International Environmental and Scientific Affairs; May 24, 1988 – March 16, 1990	Succeeded by E. U. Curtis Bohlen
