= John F. Turner =

American politician

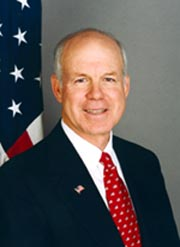

12th Assistant Secretary of State for Oceans and International Environmental and Scientific Affairs
- In office November 13, 2001 – July 11, 2005
- President: George W. Bush
- Preceded by: David B. Sandalow
- Succeeded by: Claudia A. McMurray

Director of the United States Fish and Wildlife Service
- In office 1989–1993
- Preceded by: Frank Dunkle
- Succeeded by: Mollie Beattie

Personal details
- Born: March 3, 1942 (age 84) Moose, Wyoming, U.S.
- Education: University of Notre Dame (BA); University of Michigan (MS)

John F. Turner (born March 3, 1942) was Director of the United States Fish and Wildlife Service from 1989 to 1993 and United States Assistant Secretary of State for Oceans and International Environmental and Scientific Affairs from 2001 to 2005. A lifelong river guide, dude rancher, wildlife biologist and conservative conservationist, Turner served as a Teton County Republican in the Wyoming Legislature for 20 years before being appointed to the George H. W. Bush and George W. Bush administrations.

== Early life ==
John F. Turner was born in Moose, Wyoming. He was raised in Jackson Hole, where his father owned Triangle X Ranch. He is the third generation of Turners to operate a concession the Triangle X Dude Ranch under a contract with Grand Teton National Park. The concession lies within Grand Teton National Park. The Turner's bought the land in the 1920's and then sold to the Snake River Land Company, an agent working for the Rockefeller's. The land was later donated to the federal government for the formation of Grand Teton National Park (Grand Teton National Park Service records). He was educated at the University of Notre Dame, receiving a B.A. in biology in 1964. He was assistant director for the University of Notre Dame foreign studies program in Innsbruck for 1964-65. He then attended the University of Michigan and received an M.S. in wildlife ecology in 1970.

== Career ==
Turner then returned to Jackson Hole as a partner with Triangle X Ranch. In 1970 at the age of 28, he was elected to the Wyoming House of Representatives. In 1974, he was elected to the Wyoming Senate. He served as the Wyoming Senate's vice president from 1983 to 1985; senate majority floor leader from 1985 to 1987; and president of the Wyoming Senate from 1987 to 1989. He was also vice chairman of the board for the National Wetlands System Advisory Board from 1983 to 1987 and was a member of the National Wetlands Policy Forum 1987-88.

A widely respected expert on the bald eagle, Turner published a children’s book, “The Magnificent Bald Eagle: Our National Bird,” in 1971.

In 1989, President of the United States George H. W. Bush named Turner Director of the United States Fish and Wildlife Service. He served there until 1993, when he became president and chief executive officer of The Conservation Fund. He worked there until 2001, when President George W. Bush nominated Turner to be Assistant Secretary of State for Oceans and International Environmental and Scientific Affairs; he subsequently held office until July 2005.

Turner became the first ever Beverly and Eldon Spicer Visiting Professor in Environmental and Natural Resources at the University of Wyoming in 2006. Since leaving public service, Turner has served on the Board of Directors of International Paper, Northeast Utilities, Peabody Energy, and Ashland Inc. He has been the recipient of environment leadership awards from the National Audubon Society, The Nature Conservancy and the National Wildlife Federation, along with numerous public service awards from within his home state of Wyoming. In 2010, he was awarded an honorary doctorate of law from the University of Wyoming.

Government offices
Preceded by David B. Sandalow	Assistant Secretary of State for Oceans and International Environmental and Scientific Affairs; November 13, 2001 – July 11, 2005	Succeeded by Claudia A. McMurray
