= Ron Klain =

White House chief of staff from 2021 to 2023

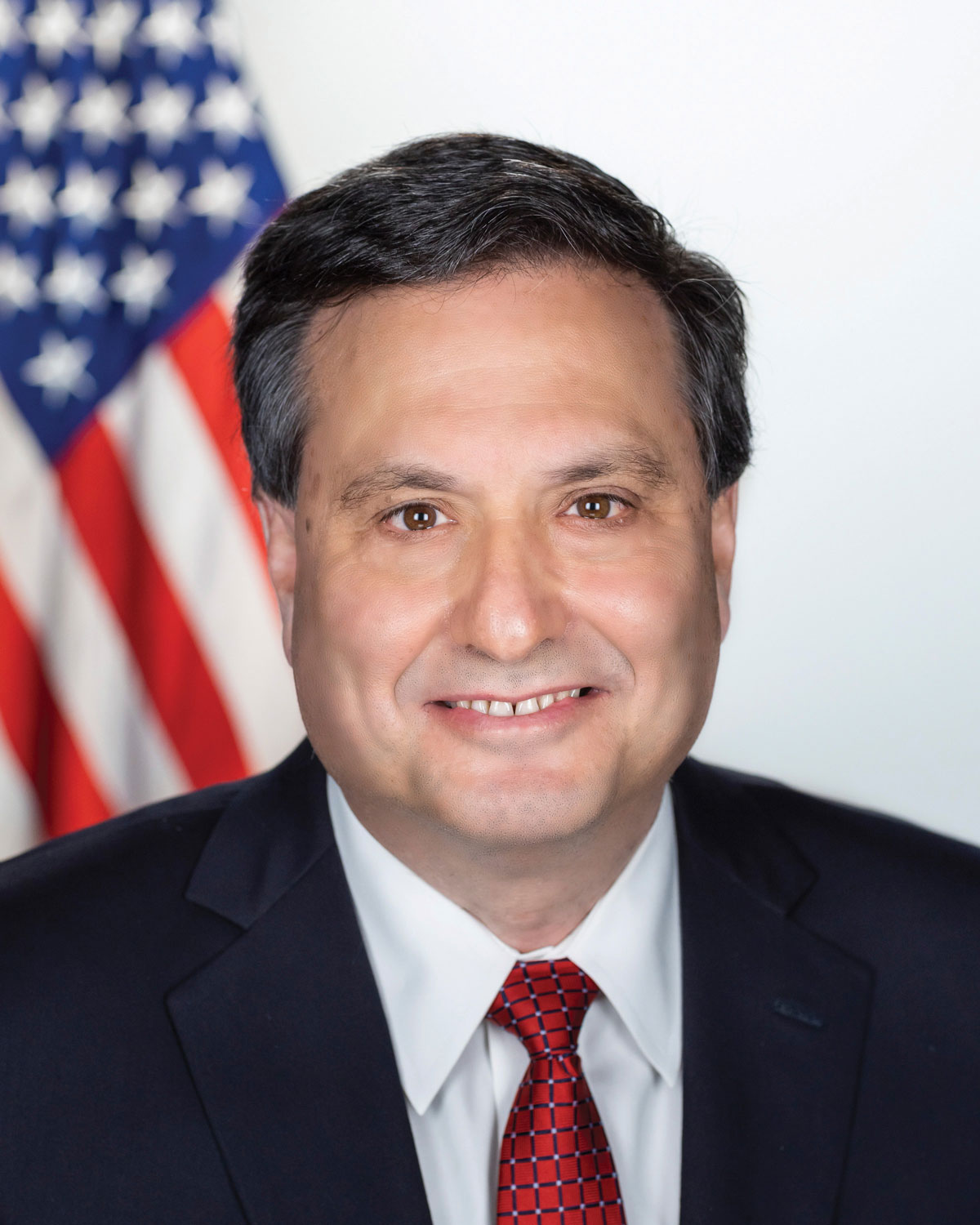
- Official portrait, 2021

30th White House Chief of Staff
- In office January 20, 2021 – February 7, 2023
- President: Joe Biden
- Deputy: Jen O'Malley Dillon; Bruce Reed
- Preceded by: Mark Meadows
- Succeeded by: Jeff Zients

White House Ebola Response Coordinator
- In office October 22, 2014 – February 15, 2015
- President: Barack Obama
- Preceded by: Position established
- Succeeded by: Position abolished

Chief of Staff to the Vice President
- In office January 20, 2009 – January 14, 2011
- Vice President: Joe Biden
- Preceded by: David Addington
- Succeeded by: Bruce Reed
- In office November 1, 1995 – August 3, 1999
- Vice President: Al Gore
- Preceded by: Jack Quinn
- Succeeded by: Charles Burson

Personal details
- Born: Ronald Alan Klain; August 8, 1961 (age 65) Indianapolis, Indiana, U.S.
- Party: Democratic
- Spouse: Monica Medina
- Children: 3
- Education: Georgetown University (BA); Harvard University (JD)

Ronald Alan Klain (born August 8, 1961) is an American attorney, political consultant, and former lobbyist who served as White House Chief of Staff under President Joe Biden from 2021 to 2023.

A Democrat, Klain previously served as chief of staff to Vice Presidents Al Gore from 1995 to 1999 and Joe Biden from 2009 to 2011. President Barack Obama also appointed Klain White House Ebola Response Coordinator following the appearance of Ebola virus cases in the United States. He served from 2014 to 2015.

Throughout 2020 he worked as a senior advisor to Biden's presidential campaign. Following his victory, Biden announced on November 12 that Klain would serve as White House chief of staff. During his tenure as chief of staff, Klain was often characterized as a key ally of the progressive wing of the Democratic Party within the White House.

In January 2023, Klain announced his plans to step down as chief of staff in the weeks after Biden's State of the Union address in February. He was succeeded in the role by Jeff Zients on February 7.

== Early life and education ==
Ronald Alan Klain was born in Indianapolis, Indiana to Stanley Klain, a building contractor, and Sarann Warner (née Horwitz), a travel agent. Klain is Jewish. He graduated from North Central High School in 1979 and was on the school's Brain Game team which finished as season runner-up. A first-generation college graduate, he received his Bachelor of Arts degree, summa cum laude, from Georgetown University in 1983. In 1987, he received his Juris Doctor degree, magna cum laude, from Harvard Law School, where he was an editor of the Harvard Law Review.

== Career ==
=== Law clerk and Capitol Hill ===
From 1983 to 1984, Klain served as legislative director for U.S. representative Ed Markey (D–MA). Klain was a law clerk for Supreme Court justice Byron White during the 1987 and 1988 terms. From 1989 to 1992, he was chief counsel to the U.S. Senate Committee on the Judiciary, overseeing the legal staff's work on matters of constitutional law, criminal law, antitrust law, and Supreme Court nominations, including the 1991 Clarence Thomas Supreme Court nomination. In 1995, Senator Tom Daschle appointed him the staff director of the Senate Democratic Leadership Committee.

=== Clinton administration ===
Klain joined the Clinton-Gore campaign in 1992 and was involved in both of Bill Clinton's presidential campaigns. He oversaw Clinton's judicial nominations. In the White House, Klain was Associate Counsel to the President, directing judicial selection efforts and leading the team that won confirmation of Supreme Court Justice Ruth Bader Ginsburg. In 1994, he became chief of staff and counselor to Attorney General Janet Reno and in 1995, chief of staff to Al Gore.

=== Gore campaign (1999–2000) ===
Klain continued to serve as Gore's chief of staff following the official launch of Gore's presidential campaign on June 16, 1999. On August 2, 1999, Klain resigned from the role to join the Washington, D.C., office of O'Melveny & Myers, a law firm. As general counsel of Gore's Recount Committee, Klain oversaw the November–December 2000 recount of votes in Florida, which ended when the Supreme Court put an end to the counting and George W. Bush was named the winner.

=== 2004–2014 ===
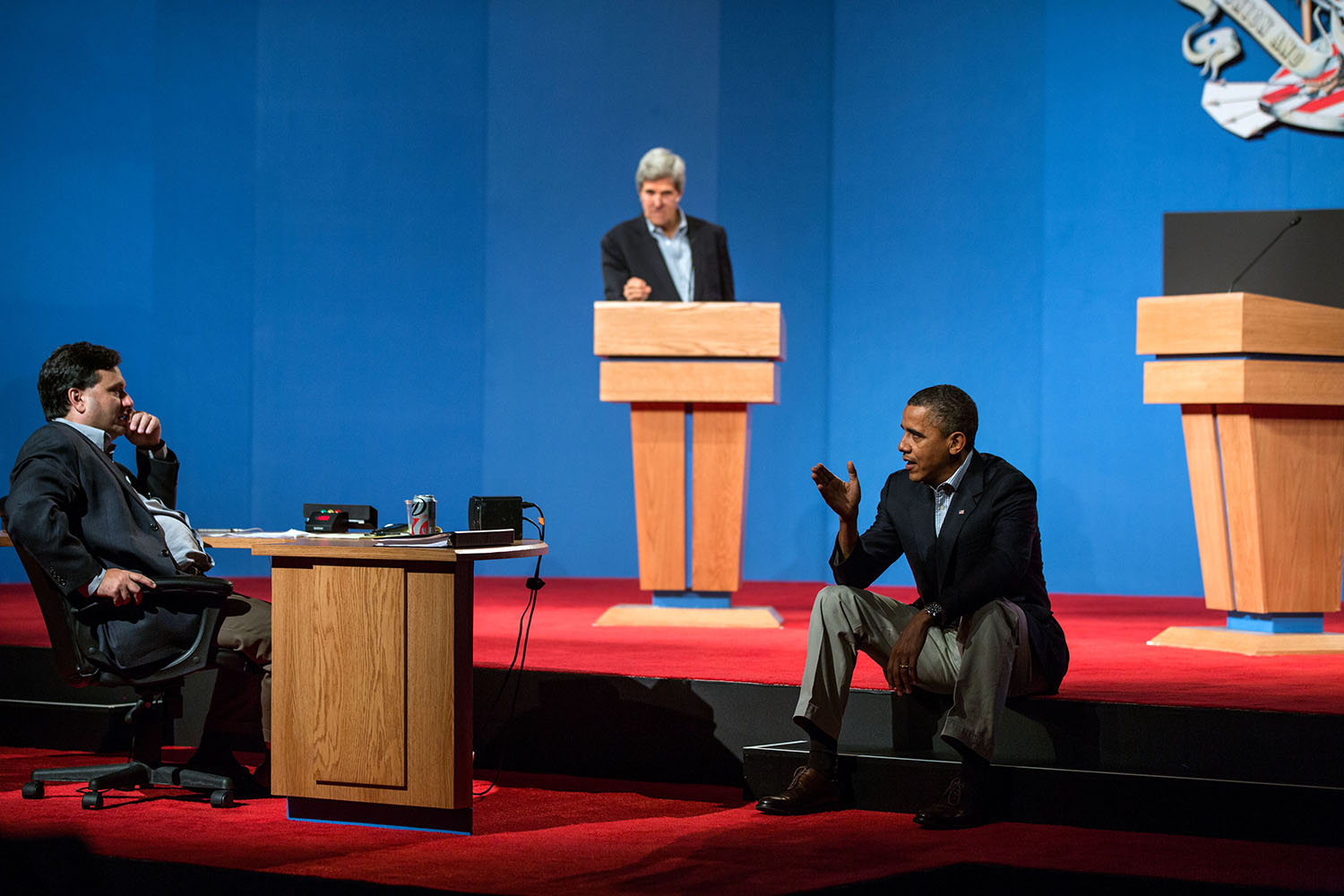
Klain prepping President Obama for a presidential debate in 2012. John Kerry (center) played the role of Mitt Romney.

During the early primaries of the 2004 presidential campaign, Klain worked as an adviser to Wesley Clark during Clark's run for president. After John Kerry won the Democratic nomination, Klain became heavily involved behind the scenes in his campaign. Klain was registered as a lobbyist for Fannie Mae until 2005.

Klain served as an informal adviser to Evan Bayh who is from Klain's home state of Indiana. In 2005, Klain left his partnership at O'Melveny & Myers to become executive vice president and general counsel of Revolution LLC, a technology venture capital firm launched by AOL co-founder Steve Case. At the time of his October 2014 appointment as Ebola response coordinator, he was general counsel at Revolution LLC and President of Case Holdings.

=== Obama administration (2008–2015) ===
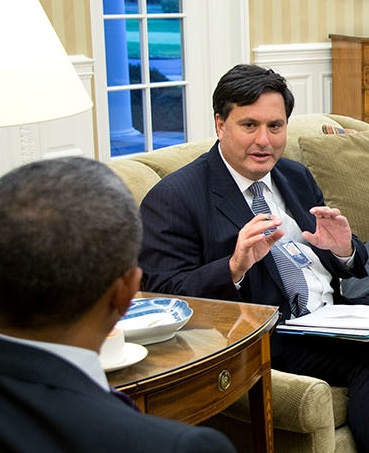
Klain briefing President Obama in his role as Ebola Response Coordinator

Klain was one of the people who assisted Barack Obama in his preparation for the 2008 United States presidential debates. On November 12, 2008, Roll Call announced that Klain had been chosen to serve as chief of staff to Vice President Joe Biden, the same role he served for Gore.

Klain had worked with Biden, having served as counsel to the United States Senate Committee on the Judiciary while Biden chaired the committee and assisted Biden's speechwriting team during the 1988 presidential campaign.

In May 2010, amid concerns about whether the now-defunct solar-panel company Solyndra was viable, Klain gave the go-ahead for an Obama visit to the factory, and stated in an email to White House advisor Valerie Jarrett that "the reality is that if POTUS visited 10 such places over the next 10 months, probably a few will be belly-up by election day 2012."

Klain was mentioned as a possible replacement for White House chief of staff Rahm Emanuel, but opted to leave the White House in January 2011 and return to Case Holdings, where he oversaw Revolution LLC and assisted Steve Case and his wife, Jean Case, in administering the Case Foundation.

On October 17, 2014, Klain was appointed the "Ebola response coordinator" sometimes referred to as Ebola "czar." Although Klain, according to Julie Hirschfeld Davis writing in The New York Times, had "no record or expertise in Ebola specifically or public health in general," the choice was praised by Ezra Klein for his bureaucratic experience with coordinating agencies. His term as Ebola response coordinator ended in February 2015.

After his term as Ebola czar, Klain worked as an external advisor to the Skoll Foundation Global Threats Fund. He also served as chairman, public advocate and private advisor for Higher Grounds Labs, which describes itself as supporting "start-ups building products that help progressives win."

=== Clinton campaign and Trump years ===
In 2015, Klain joined Hillary Clinton's ultimately unsuccessful presidential campaign. He helped Clinton prepare for the Democratic primary debates, as well as the presidential debates against Republican nominee Donald Trump. After Trump's election, he continued to work at Revolution LLC, and repeatedly criticized the administration in op-eds and television appearances.

=== Biden campaign and administration ===
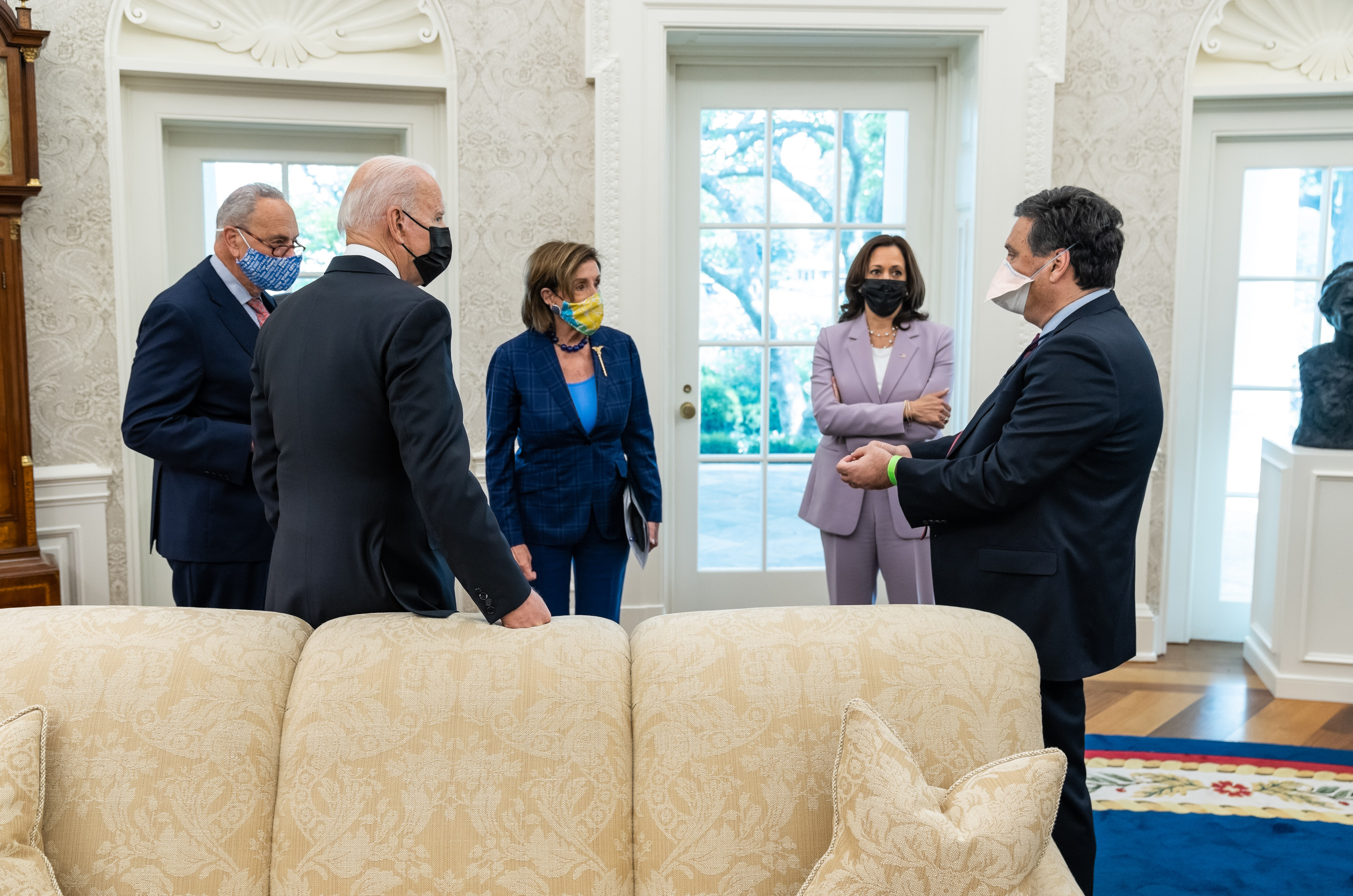
Klain with President Joe Biden, Vice President Kamala Harris, Nancy Pelosi, and Chuck Schumer in the Oval Office, July 2021

During the 2020 Biden campaign, Klain served as an advisor on the COVID-19 pandemic. In April 2020 he told Wired: "If we’re going to make Covid-19 go away, we’re going to need a very high vaccination rate. The number one public health challenge of 2021 is going to be getting people to take the vaccine." He helped Biden prepare for the presidential debates against Trump. On November 11, 2020, it was announced that President-elect Joe Biden had selected Klain to be White House Chief of Staff.

Klain has received praise for his organizational abilities and for his responsiveness while serving as President Biden's chief of staff, while drawing criticism for being overly concerned with élite opinion, as reflected by his active Twitter presence, and for being too aligned with his party's left bloc. During his first year in his position, Klain used Twitter, saying "I find being on Twitter useful as an early-warning system of things that, to be honest, reporters are talking about." He also uses the platform to take aim at critics and to push pro-Biden messages.

In October 2022, the Office of Special Counsel found that Klain had violated the Hatch Act and was warned not to do so again.

Klain was seen as a highly impactful chief of staff who achieved major legislative victories such as passing the American Rescue Plan Act and the Infrastructure Investment and Jobs Act. Klain resigned on a high note for the Biden Administration following an unexpectedly strong showing in the 2022 midterm elections and signs of easing inflation.

On January 21, 2023, it was reported that Klain would resign as chief of staff in the period following the 2023 State of the Union Address on February 7. On February 1, 2023, the White House held a goodbye transition event for Klain. Klain returned to legal services firm, O'Melveny & Myers LLP as a partner, on April 18, 2023, to lead its Strategic Counseling and Crisis Management Practice.

=== Post-Biden administration ===
On November 20, 2023, Airbnb announced that Klain would join the company as chief legal officer on January 1, 2024.

During the run-up to the 2024 presidential election, Klain publicly warned the Biden re-election campaign to refocus on immediate economic problems affecting American voters such as inflation rather than long-term projects such as infrastructure investments.

== Personal life ==
Klain is married to Monica Medina, an attorney, consultant, and co-founder of Our Daily Planet, an environmental news platform. They were college sweethearts at Georgetown and in February 2019 he tweeted that they were celebrating their 40th Valentine's Day together. They have three adult children, Hannah, Michael and Daniel.

In financial disclosures, Klain reported owning assets worth $4.4–12.2 million in 2021 compared to $1.4–3.5 million in 2009. He received a salary of almost $2 million in 2020 from the venture capital firm Revolution LLC, where he served as general counsel and executive vice president. In 2009, he reported earning a salary of $1 million.

Klain lives in Chevy Chase, Maryland, with neighbors that include U. S. Supreme Court Chief Justice John Roberts and Justice Brett Kavanaugh. He has referred to his large home as “the House That O’Melveny Built,” after his lucrative time at the international law firm O’Melveny & Myers.

== In popular culture ==
Klain was portrayed by Kevin Spacey in the HBO film Recount, which depicted the tumult of the 2000 presidential election. In 2021, he was included in the Time 100, Time's annual list of the 100 most influential people in the world. In 2023, Klain was portrayed by Jon Levine in season four of For All Mankind, which takes place in an alternate timeline in which Al Gore wins the 2000 election and Klain becomes the White House liaison to NASA.

== See also ==
- List of law clerks for the sixth seat of the Supreme Court of the United States
- Revolving door (politics)

Political offices
Preceded by Jack Quinn	Chief of Staff to the Vice President; 1995–1999	Succeeded by Charles Burson
Preceded by David Addington	Chief of Staff to the Vice President; 2009–2011	Succeeded by Bruce Reed
Preceded by Mark Meadows	White House Chief of Staff; 2021–2023	Succeeded by Jeff Zients
