= Kerri-Ann Jones =

American diplomat (born 1954)

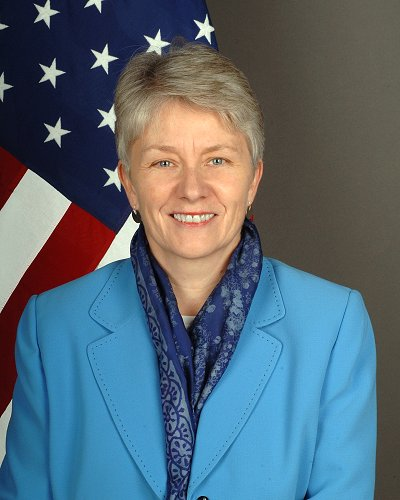

14th Assistant Secretary of State for Oceans and International Environmental and Scientific Affairs
- In office August 20, 2009 – April 25, 2014
- President: Barack Obama
- Preceded by: Claudia A. McMurray
- Succeeded by: Monica Medina (2021)

Director of the Office of Science and Technology Policy
- Acting
- In office April 4, 1998 – August 3, 1998
- President: Bill Clinton
- Preceded by: Jack Gibbons
- Succeeded by: Neal Francis Lane

Personal details
- Born: 1954 (age 71–72)
- Education: Columbia University (BS); Yale University (MS, PhD)
- Scientific career
- Fields: Biochemistry
- Workplaces: Rockefeller University; United States Agency for International Development
- Thesis: Characterization of the response to stress in yeast (Heat shock, NMR) (1985)
- Doctoral advisor: Robert G. Shulman

Kerri-Ann Jones (born 1954) was vice president of research and science at The Pew Charitable Trusts. She is the former United States Assistant Secretary of State for Oceans and International Environmental and Scientific Affairs at the U.S. State Department. Nominated by President Barack Obama in June 2009, she was sworn in on August 20 of that year.

== Biography ==
=== Education ===
Kerri-Ann Jones received a bachelor's degree in chemistry from Barnard College of Columbia University in 1975. After graduating, she worked as a research assistant in immunology and developmental biology at Rockefeller University. She received a PhD in 1985 from Yale University's Department of Molecular Biophysics and Biochemistry, where she used nuclear magnetic resonance to study the effects of stress on metabolism and gene expression.

=== Career ===
In 1985 Jones won a Science Engineering and Diplomacy Fellowship from the American Association for the Advancement of Science which placed her in the Science and Technology Bureau of the U.S. Agency for International Development (USAID). She then spent a year in New Delhi, India, as the Biotechnology Advisor at the United States Agency for International Development there.

Returning to the United States, Jones worked briefly with National Institute of Health's Fogarty International Center. She then moved to USAID (1988–1995) where she worked in technical and management positions with the Science and Technology and the Asia Near East Bureaus. She directed the Division of Technical Resources where she was responsible for a portfolio that included policy and programs in the areas of science and technology, agriculture, health, education and environment. She designed and managed the U.S. Asia Pacific Economic Cooperation (APEC) Partnership for Education, the first major U.S. contribution to APEC. She was instrumental in the initial design of the U.S.-Asia Environmental Partnership.

In 1996 President of the United States Bill Clinton nominated Jones to be associate director of the Office of Science and Technology Policy and, after Senate confirmation, she held this post until 1999. She also served on the National Security Council as the Senior Director for Science and Technology Affairs. In 2000 she became the state director for Maine's Experimental Program to Stimulate Competitive Research (EPSCOR), a grant program supported by several federal agencies including the National Science Foundation (NSF) and NIH. In 2002 she moved to the National Science Foundation as Director of the Office of International Science and Engineering. She left that post in 2005 to work as an independent consultant in Maine.

Under her role as Assistant Secretary of State, Jones also served as the U.S. co-chair of the U.S.-Ireland R&D Partnership Steering Group.

Government offices
Preceded by Jack Gibbons	Director of the Office of Science and Technology Policy; Acting; 1998	Succeeded by Neal Francis Lane
Preceded by Claudia A. McMurray	Assistant Secretary of State for Oceans and International Environmental and Scientific Affairs; 2009–2014	Succeeded by Judith G. Garber; Acting
