= Assistant Secretary of State for Oceans and International Environmental and Scientific Affairs =

U.S. government position

United States Assistant Secretary of State for Oceans and International Environmental and Scientific Affairs
- Seal of the United States Department of State

- Flag of an assistant secretary of state

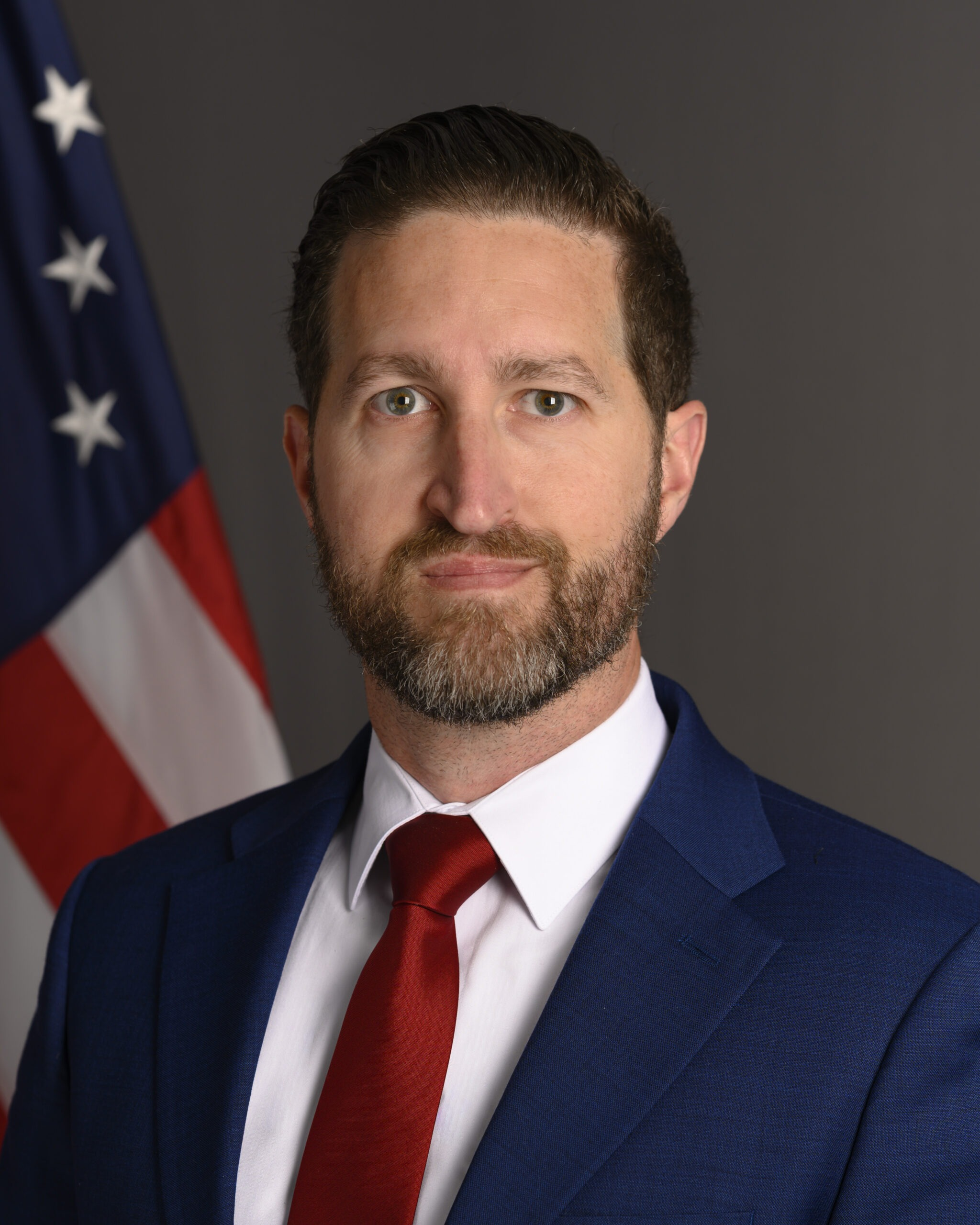
- Incumbent; Wesley Brooks since May 28, 2026
- Style: The Honorable
- Reports to: Under Secretary for Economic Growth, Energy, and the Environment
- Nominator: President of the United States
- Inaugural holder: Dixy Lee Ray
- Formation: 1975
- Website: Official Website

The assistant secretary of state for oceans and international environmental and scientific affairs is the head of the Bureau of Oceans and International Environmental and Scientific Affairs in the United States Department of State. Their mission is "to provide American leadership, diplomacy, and scientific cooperation to conserve and protect the global environment, ocean, and space for the prosperity, peace, and security of this and future generations". The Assistant Secretary of State for Oceans and International Environmental and Scientific Affairs reports to the Under Secretary of State for Economic Growth, Energy, and the Environment. The goal of the agency is to "Advance America's security and prosperity through international leadership on oceans, environment, science, space, and health".

President Joe Biden nominated Monica Medina as Assistant Secretary on April 27, 2021. Medina was confirmed by the Senate on September 28, 2021, by a vote of 61–36. In 2023 President Biden appointed Jennifer Littlejohn as the new Assistant Secretary of state. Ms. Littlejohn is the assistant secretary of Bureau of Oceans and International Environmental and Scientific Affairs. Prior to her current employment Ms. Littlejohn was a deputy director of secretary of states policy planning staff. Her position required her to "serve as a source of independent policy analysis and advice for the Secretary of State" (Policy Planning Staff). Her job mainly consists of developing considerations regarding policies throughout the organization. "The Assistant Secretary sees that such activities are designed and implemented in a manner that furthers overall U.S. foreign policy objectives" (1 FAM 504).

Ms. Littlejohn has made great impacts to help benefit the environment; her most recent project Included her traveling to Sri Lanka, India, and Maldives to discuss climate change, plastic waste, air pollution, deforestation, and more. "In India from August 21 to 28, Acting Assistant Secretary Littlejohn will engage government officials on collaboration on scientific research, space exploration, combatting wildlife trafficking, and – in Chennai – support for river restoration through the Ambassador’s Water Experts Program" (state.gov).

== Assistant secretaries of state for oceans and international environmental and scientific affairs, 1975—present ==
#	Name	Assumed office	Left office	President appointed by
1	Dixy Lee Ray	January 19, 1975	June 20, 1975	Gerald Ford
2	Frederick Irving	April 28, 1976	March 26, 1977	Gerald Ford
3	Patsy T. Mink	March 28, 1977	May 1, 1978	Jimmy Carter
4	Thomas R. Pickering	October 10, 1978	February 24, 1981	Jimmy Carter
5	James L. Malone	June 1, 1981	July 22, 1985	Ronald Reagan
6	John Negroponte	July 19, 1985	November 23, 1987	Ronald Reagan
7	Frederick M. Bernthal	May 24, 1988	March 16, 1990	Ronald Reagan
8	E. U. Curtis Bohlen	June 27, 1990	October 31, 1992	George H. W. Bush
9	Elinor G. Constable	June 2, 1993	September 15, 1995	Bill Clinton
10	Eileen B. Claussen	January 19, 1996	July 18, 1997	Bill Clinton
11	David B. Sandalow	October 28, 1999	January 19, 2001	Bill Clinton
12	John F. Turner	November 13, 2001	July 11, 2005	George W. Bush
13	Claudia A. McMurray	February 21, 2006	January 20, 2009	George W. Bush
14	Kerri-Ann Jones	August 20, 2009	April 25, 2014	Barack Obama
-	Judith G. Garber (acting)	April 26, 2014	September 7, 2017	Barack Obama; Donald Trump
-	vacant	September 7, 2017	September 7, 2020	Donald Trump
-	Jonathan M. Moore (acting)	September 8, 2020	January 20, 2021	Donald Trump
-	vacant	January 20, 2021	August 5, 2021	Joe Biden
-	Marcia Bernicat (acting)	August 6, 2021	September 28, 2021	Joe Biden
15	Monica Medina	September 28, 2021	April 28, 2023	Joe Biden
-	Jennifer R. Littlejohn (acting)	May 1, 2023	January 20, 2025	Joe Biden
-	Tony Fernandes (acting)	January 20, 2025	August 6, 2025	Donald Trump
-	John E. Thompson (acting)	August 7, 2025	May 28, 2026	Donald Trump
16	Wesley Brooks	May 28, 2026	Present	Donald Trump

== Senior bureau official for the Bureau of Oceans and International Environmental and Scientific Affairs, 2014—2021 ==
Portrait	Name	Assumed office	Left office	Title
	Judith G. Garber	April 26, 2014	January 1, 2019	(Acting Assistant Secretary April 26, 2014 – September 7, 2017) Senior Bureau Official September 8, 2017 – January 1, 2019
	Marcia Bernicat	January 1, 2019	April 3, 2020	Senior Bureau Official
	Jonathan M. Moore	April 3, 2020	September 7, 2020	Senior Bureau Official April 3 – September 7 (named Acting Assistant Secretary September 8, 2020 - January 20, 2021)
	Marcia Bernicat	January 20, 2021	August 5, 2021	Senior Bureau Official January 20 – August 5 (named Acting Assistant Secretary August 6, 2021)
