= Thomas R. Pickering =

American diplomat (born 1931)

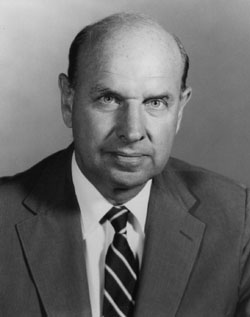
- Portrait of Pickering

17th Under Secretary of State for Political Affairs
- In office May 27, 1997 – December 31, 2000
- President: Bill Clinton
- Preceded by: Peter Tarnoff
- Succeeded by: Marc Grossman

United States Ambassador to Russia
- In office May 12, 1993 – November 1, 1996
- President: Bill Clinton
- Preceded by: Robert S. Strauss
- Succeeded by: James F. Collins

United States Ambassador to India
- In office April 6, 1992 – March 23, 1993
- President: George H. W. Bush; Bill Clinton
- Preceded by: William Clark
- Succeeded by: Frank G. Wisner

18th United States Ambassador to the United Nations
- In office March 20, 1989 – May 7, 1992
- President: George H. W. Bush
- Preceded by: Vernon A. Walters
- Succeeded by: Edward J. Perkins

United States Ambassador to Israel
- In office August 6, 1985 – December 28, 1988
- President: Ronald Reagan
- Preceded by: Samuel W. Lewis
- Succeeded by: William Andreas Brown

United States Ambassador to El Salvador
- In office September 5, 1983 – June 7, 1985
- President: Ronald Reagan
- Preceded by: Deane R. Hinton
- Succeeded by: Edwin G. Corr

United States Ambassador to Nigeria
- In office November 30, 1981 – July 9, 1983
- President: Ronald Reagan
- Preceded by: Stephen Low
- Succeeded by: Thomas W. M. Smith

4th Assistant Secretary of State for Oceans and International Environmental and Scientific Affairs
- In office October 10, 1978 – February 24, 1981
- President: Jimmy Carter; Ronald Reagan
- Preceded by: Patsy Mink
- Succeeded by: James Malone

United States Ambassador to Jordan
- In office March 2, 1974 – July 13, 1978
- President: Richard Nixon; Gerald Ford; Jimmy Carter
- Preceded by: L. Dean Brown
- Succeeded by: Nicholas A. Veliotes

5th Executive Secretary of the Department of State
- In office July 30, 1973 – January 31, 1974
- President: Richard Nixon
- Preceded by: Theodore L. Eliot Jr.
- Succeeded by: George Springsteen

Personal details
- Born: Thomas Reeve Pickering; November 5, 1931 (age 95) Orange, New Jersey, U.S.
- Spouse: Alice Stover (m. 1955; died 2011)
- Children: 2
- Education: Bowdoin College (BA); Tufts University (MA); University of Melbourne (MA)

Thomas Reeve Pickering (born November 5, 1931) is a former American diplomat. Among his many appointments, he served as U.S. ambassador to the United Nations from 1989 to 1992.

== Early life and education ==
Born in Orange, New Jersey, Pickering is the son of Hamilton Reeve Pickering and Sarah Chasteney Pickering. Raised in Rutherford, New Jersey, he graduated from Rutherford High School.

Pickering enrolled at Bowdoin College in Brunswick, Maine in 1949 with plans to join the ministry and graduated cum laude in 1953 with high honors in history and is a member of Theta Delta Chi and Phi Beta Kappa. He then earned a master's degree from the Fletcher School of Law and Diplomacy at Tufts University. Upon graduation from Tufts, he was awarded a Fulbright Fellowship and attended the University of Melbourne in Australia where he received a second master's degree in 1956. In addition to the honorary doctorate-in-laws degree that Bowdoin awarded him in 1984, Pickering has been the recipient of 12 honorary degrees.

Before joining the State Department, Pickering served on active duty in the United States Navy from 1956 to 1959, and later served in the Naval Reserve where he reached the rank of Lieutenant Commander.

== Diplomatic career ==
Pickering's four-decade-long career in Foreign Service included ambassadorships in Russia (1993–1996); India (1992–1993); to the United Nations (1989–1992); Israel (1985–1988); El Salvador (1983–1985); Nigeria (1981–1983); and Jordan (1974–1978). Additionally, he served as Under Secretary of State for Political Affairs from 1997 to 2000. He holds the rank of Career Ambassador, the highest in the U.S. Foreign Service.

=== Early career ===
Early in his career, he was assigned to the U.S. embassy in Tanzania and later was special assistant to secretaries of state William P. Rogers and Henry Kissinger. When Pickering served as United States Ambassador to Jordan in the mid-1970s, King Hussein declared him "the best American ambassador I've dealt with." From 1978 to 1981, he served as Assistant Secretary of State for Oceans and International Environmental and Scientific Affairs. He then spent time as the United States Ambassador to Nigeria.

=== Ambassador to El Salvador ===
President Ronald Reagan replaced the ambassador to El Salvador, Deane R. Hinton, and put Pickering in his place.

Pickering's time as United States Ambassador to El Salvador was particularly eventful. Only a year after having been appointed ambassador in 1984, Pickering was the subject of assassination threats from right-wing Salvadoran politicians. The same year, Republican senator Jesse Helms of North Carolina urged that Pickering be dismissed, arguing that he helped manipulate the country's elections. In both cases, President Ronald Reagan offered Pickering his full support and he secured him a job as United States Ambassador to Israel after his appointment in El Salvador. It was later noted when Pickering was nominated as U.S. ambassador to the United Nations that he played a minor role in the Iran–Contra affair while ambassador to El Salvador.

=== Ambassador to Israel ===
As ambassador to Israel, Pickering led the United States' criticism of an Israeli policy that expelled Palestinians accused of instilling uprising. Pickering stressed to Israeli prime minister Yitzhak Shamir that the United States considered the actions illegal and unhelpful for peace efforts.

=== Ambassador to the United Nations ===
President George H. W. Bush's appointment of Pickering as United States Ambassador to the United Nations was approved almost unanimously in the United States Senate in 1989 with no dissensions and only one abstention. Pickering played a critical role as Ambassador during the First Gulf War, when he helped lead the United Nations Security Council's response to Iraq's invasion of Kuwait.

=== Ambassador to India ===
Bush's decision to move Pickering from the United Nations to become the United States Ambassador to India was highly criticized given Pickering's successful tenure. The New York Times declared that Pickering was "arguably the best-ever U.S. representative to that body" and that the move was made simply because he overshadowed Secretary of State James A. Baker during the Persian Gulf Crisis.

=== Ambassador to Russia ===
Pickering's last ambassadorial appointment was made by President Bill Clinton who designated him United States Ambassador to Russia.

In December 1994, while serving as U.S. Ambassador to Russia, he wrote that "hostility to early NATO expansion is almost universally felt across the domestic political spectrum here." Although the quote would erroneously be described as coming from William J. Burns, who was serving as counselor for political affairs at the U.S. Embassy in Moscow at the time, Burns did not claim ownership of the cable, only saying, in his memoir, that "we reported [it] just after the Budapest outburst."

Following the resignation of Secretary of State Warren Christopher in 1996, Pickering was reportedly a top contender for the post, but was ultimately passed over in favor of then-UN Ambassador Madeleine Albright.

=== Under Secretary of State ===
From 1997 to 2001, Pickering served as Under Secretary of State for Political Affairs, the number-three position at the State Department. When Albright appointed him to the post, Time magazine declared him the "five star general of the diplomatic corps". In 1998, he was a special envoy to Nigeria and was meeting with imprisoned leader M. K. O. Abiola on the day of his release. In a BBC interview made at the time, Pickering recounted how during the meeting Abiola became ill, and died soon after.

== After the State Department ==
Following his retirement from the Foreign Service in 2001, Pickering served as Senior Vice President for International Relations at Boeing until 2006. Currently, he is serving as an independent board member at the world's biggest pipe company, OAO TMK, in Moscow. At present, he is affiliated with the International Crisis Group and currently serves as its Co-Chair, and oversees their international actions as co-chair. In addition, he is Chairman of the Center for the Study of the Presidency and Congress, Chairman of the Board of Advisers of the Institute for the Study of Diplomacy, Chairman of the American Academy of Diplomacy, Chairman of the Rostropovich-Vishnevskaya Foundation, and a member of the Board of Advisors of the National Bureau of Asian Research and the Global Panel Foundation based in Berlin, Prague and Sydney.

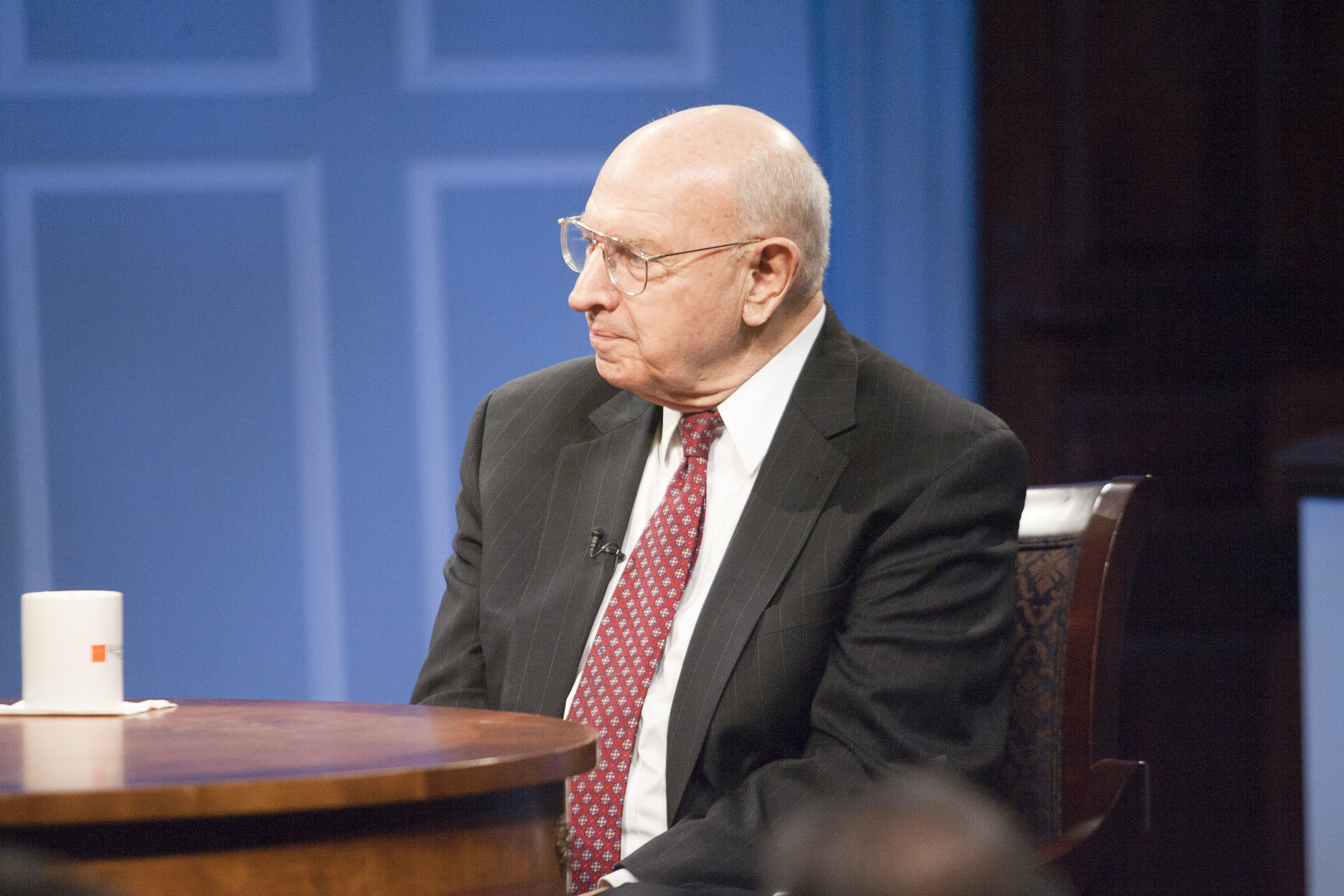
Pickering in 2014

Following his retirement, the U.S. Department of State Foreign Affairs Fellowship Program was renamed the Thomas R. Pickering Foreign Affairs Fellowship Program to honor Pickering. Fellowships are funded by the U.S. Department of State and administered by The Washington Center for Internships and Academic Seminars. In May 2004, Bowdoin awarded Pickering the Bowdoin Prize, the highest award that the College bestows upon its graduates.

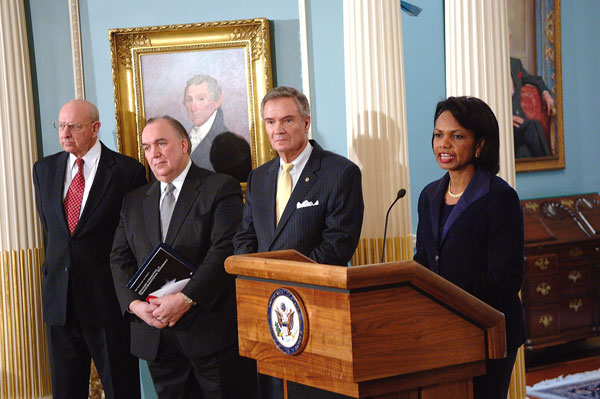
Secretary Condoleezza Rice with (left to right): Tom Pickering, John Engler and John Breaux at the presentation of Final Report of the Secretary's Advisory Committee on Transformational Diplomacy

Pickering serves on the board of directors for CRDF Global and the American Iranian Council, an organization devoted to the normalization of relations between Iran and America. He is currently a member of the Constitution Project's bipartisan Liberty and Security Committee. He is also a member of the Council on Foreign Relations and the Henry L. Stimson Center board of directors as well as the advisory board of Eurasia Group, the political risk consultancy firm, and America Abroad Media. He serves on the Guiding Coalition of the nonpartisan Project on National Security Reform. Pickering also serves as an advisory board member for the Partnership for a Secure America.

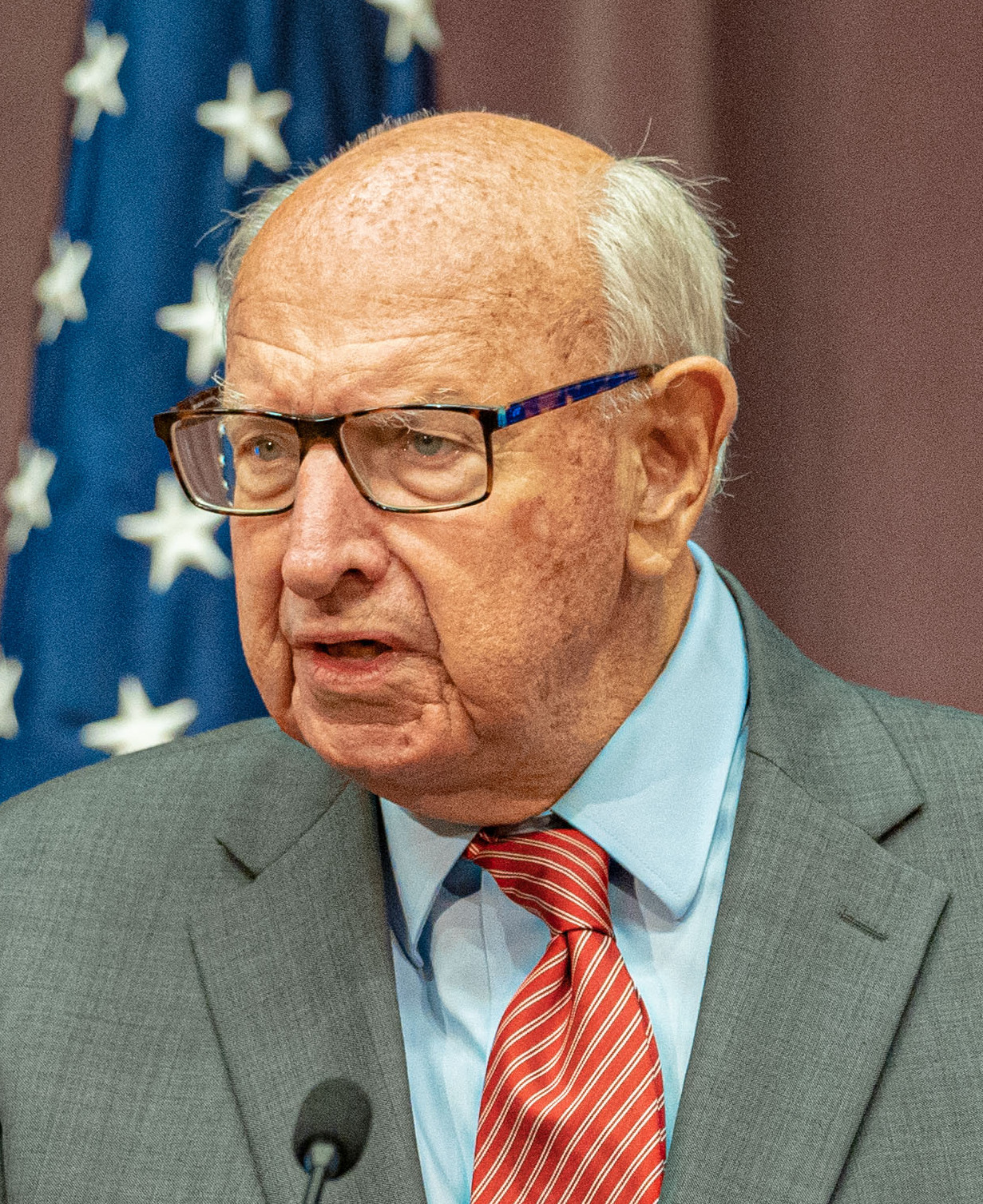
Pickering in August 2022

Pickering also serves as Co-Chairman of the International Economic Alliance (IEA), where he actively hosts and partakes in international forums attended by notable corporate leaders, ambassadors, and senior government officials from member nations of the Alliance.

Pickering is a member of the Global Leadership Foundation, an organization that works to support democratic leadership, prevent and resolve conflict through mediation, and promote good governance. He is also a board member of the National Iranian American Council (NIAC).

In 2012, along with former Chairman of the Joint Chiefs of Staff Admiral Michael Mullen, Pickering helped lead a State-Department-sponsored panel investigating the Attack on the U.S. diplomatic mission in Benghazi.

In 2014, Pickering gave the keynote speech at the Student Conference on U.S. Affairs at West Point, New York, addressing the unique challenges that disaster preparedness poses to United States foreign policy planning.

== Personal life ==
Pickering lives in Fairfax County, Virginia. His wife, the former Alice Jean Stover, whom he married in 1955, died in 2011. The couple had two children, Timothy and Margaret.

Pickering is fluent in French, Spanish, and Swahili, and has a working knowledge of Russian, Hebrew, and Arabic.

== Honors and awards ==
In 2002, Pickering was presented the Lifetime Contributions to American Diplomacy Award by the American Foreign Service Association.

In May 2015, Pickering received an honorary Doctor of Laws degree from Brandeis University. He addressed the graduates as the commencement speaker.

Government offices
Preceded by Theodore L. Eliot Jr.	Executive Secretary of the Department of State; 1973–1974	Succeeded by George Springsteen
Diplomatic posts
Preceded by L. Dean Brown	United States Ambassador to Jordan; 1974–1978	Succeeded by Nicholas A. Veliotes
Preceded by Stephen Low	United States Ambassador to Nigeria; 1981–1983	Succeeded by Thomas W. M. Smith
Preceded by Deane R. Hinton	United States Ambassador to El Salvador; 1983–1985	Succeeded by Edwin G. Corr
Preceded by Samuel W. Lewis	United States Ambassador to Israel; 1985–1988	Succeeded by William Andreas Brown
Preceded by Vernon A. Walters	United States Ambassador to the United Nations; 1989–1992	Succeeded by Edward J. Perkins
Preceded by William Clark	United States Ambassador to India; 1992–1993	Succeeded by Frank G. Wisner
Preceded by Robert S. Strauss	United States Ambassador to Russia; 1993–1996	Succeeded by James F. Collins
Political offices
Preceded by Patsy Mink	Assistant Secretary of State for Oceans and International Environmental and Scientific Affairs; 1978–1981	Succeeded by James Malone
Preceded by Peter Tarnoff	Under Secretary of State for Political Affairs; 1997–2000	Succeeded by Marc Grossman
