= John Negroponte =

American diplomat (born 1939)

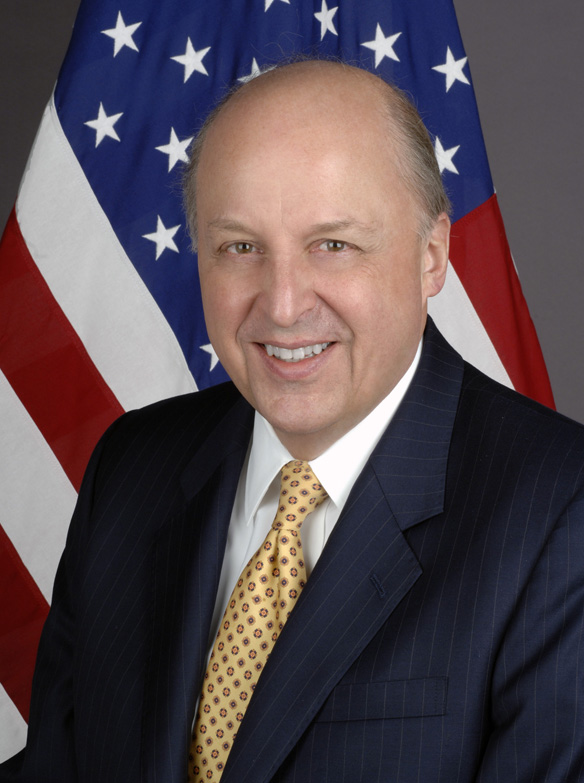
- Official portrait, 2007

15th United States Deputy Secretary of State
- In office February 27, 2007 – January 23, 2009
- President: George W. Bush; Barack Obama
- Secretary: Condoleezza Rice; Hillary Clinton
- Preceded by: Robert Zoellick
- Succeeded by: James Steinberg

1st Director of National Intelligence
- In office April 21, 2005 – February 13, 2007
- President: George W. Bush
- Preceded by: Position established
- Succeeded by: Mike McConnell

United States Ambassador to Iraq
- In office July 29, 2004 – March 17, 2005
- President: George W. Bush
- Preceded by: Krzysztof Biernacki (acting)
- Succeeded by: Zalmay Khalilzad

23rd United States Ambassador to the United Nations
- In office September 19, 2001 – June 23, 2004
- President: George W. Bush
- Preceded by: James B. Cunningham (acting)
- Succeeded by: John Danforth

United States Ambassador to the Philippines
- In office October 26, 1993 – August 5, 1996
- President: Bill Clinton
- Preceded by: Richard H. Solomon
- Succeeded by: Thomas C. Hubbard

United States Ambassador to Mexico
- In office July 3, 1989 – September 5, 1993
- President: George H. W. Bush; Bill Clinton
- Preceded by: Charles J. Pilliod Jr.
- Succeeded by: James R. Jones

16th United States Deputy National Security Advisor
- In office November 23, 1987 – January 20, 1989
- President: Ronald Reagan
- Preceded by: Colin Powell
- Succeeded by: Robert Gates

6th Assistant Secretary of State for Oceans and International Environmental and Scientific Affairs
- In office July 19, 1985 – November 23, 1987
- President: Ronald Reagan
- Preceded by: James L. Malone
- Succeeded by: Frederick M. Bernthal

United States Ambassador to Honduras
- In office November 11, 1981 – May 30, 1985
- President: Ronald Reagan
- Preceded by: Jack R. Binns
- Succeeded by: John Arthur Ferch

Personal details
- Born: John Dimitri Negroponte; July 21, 1939 (age 87) London, England, UK
- Party: Republican
- Spouse: Diana Villiers (m. 1971)
- Children: 5
- Education: Yale University (BA); Harvard University (attended)

John Dimitri Negroponte (/ˌnɛɡroʊˈpɒnti/; born July 21, 1939) is an American diplomat. In 2018, he was a James R. Schlesinger Distinguished Professor at the Miller Center for Public Affairs at the University of Virginia. He is a former J.B. and Maurice C. Shapiro Professor of International Affairs at the George Washington University's Elliott School of International Affairs. Prior to this appointment, he served as a research fellow and lecturer in international affairs at Yale University's Jackson Institute for Global Affairs, United States Deputy Secretary of State (2007–2009), and the first ever Director of National Intelligence (2005–2007).

Negroponte served in the United States Foreign Service from 1960 to 1997. From 1981 to 1996, he had tours of duty as United States ambassador in Honduras, Mexico, and the Philippines. After leaving the Foreign Service, he subsequently served in the Bush administration as U.S. permanent representative to the United Nations from 2001 to 2004, and was ambassador to Iraq from June 2004 to April 2005.

== Early life and education ==
Negroponte was born in London on July 21, 1939, to Greek parents Dimitrios Negrepontis (1915–1996) of the Negroponte family and Catherine Coumantaros (1917–2001). His father was a shipping magnate and alpine skier who competed in the 1936 Winter Olympics. Negroponte attended the Allen-Stevenson School and The Buckley School and graduated from Phillips Exeter Academy in 1956 and Yale University in 1960. He was a member of Fence Club (Psi Upsilon fraternity), alongside William H. T. Bush, the brother of President George H. W. Bush, and Porter Goss, who served as Director of Central Intelligence and Director of the Central Intelligence Agency under Negroponte from 2005 to 2006.

== Career ==
Negroponte joined the United States Foreign Service in 1960. He served at eight different Foreign Service posts in Asia (including the U.S. Embassy, Saigon), Europe and Latin America, and he also held important positions at the State Department and the White House. As a young Foreign Service officer—one of the few men in Washington who dared to openly disagree with Henry Kissinger's secretive handling of the Vietnam peace talks—Negroponte attempted to convince his superior that any peace agreement negotiated without the consent of South Vietnam's leader Nguyen Van Thieu would fail. Seymour Hersh claims in his book The Price of Power that Kissinger never forgave Negroponte, and, upon becoming Secretary of State, exiled him to Quito, Ecuador. This was to be the beginning of Negroponte's long distinguished career as an ambassador. In 1981, he became the U.S. Ambassador to Honduras. From 1985 to 1987, Negroponte held the position of Assistant Secretary of State for Oceans and International Environmental and Scientific Affairs. Subsequently, he served as Deputy Assistant to the President for National Security Affairs, from 1987 to 1989; Ambassador to Mexico, from 1989 to 1993; and Ambassador to the Philippines from 1993 to 1996. As Deputy National Security Advisor to President Ronald Reagan, he was involved in the campaign to remove General Manuel Noriega from power in Panama. From 1997 until his appointment as ambassador to the U.N., Negroponte was an executive with McGraw-Hill.

=== Ambassador to Honduras (1981–1985) ===
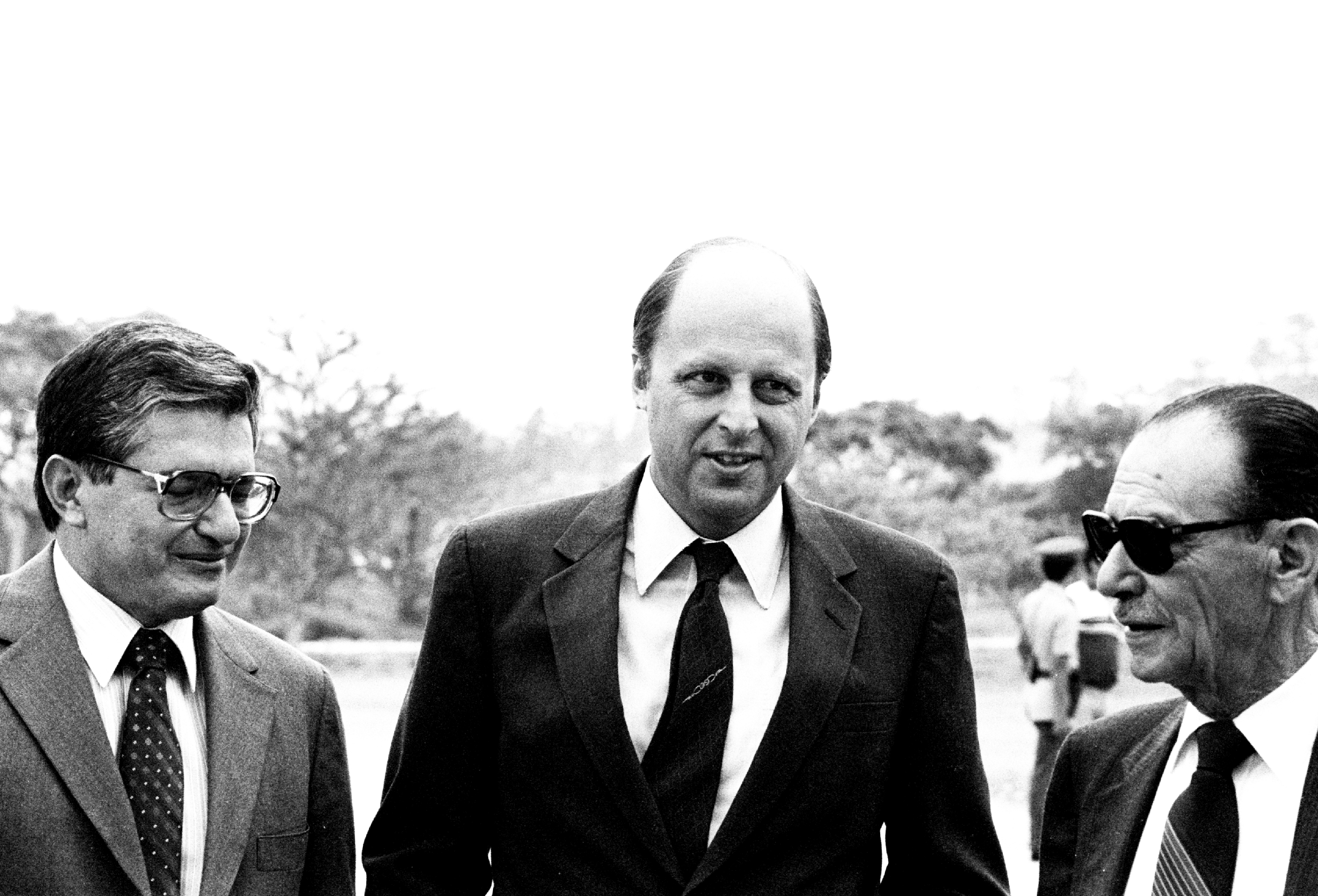
John Negroponte at the Military Camp in Honduras in April 1984

From 1981 to 1985, Negroponte was the U.S. ambassador to Honduras. During this time, the US began to maintain a significant military presence there, with the goal of overthrowing the revolutionary Sandinista government of Nicaragua, which had overthrown the Somoza dictatorship in a civil war. Military aid to Honduras grew from $4 million to $77.4 million a year. Honduras also received over $200 million in economic aid.

In 1995, The Baltimore Sun published an extensive investigation of U.S. activities in Honduras. The investigation found that Negroponte was aware of human rights abuses being committed by Battalion 3–16, but these were deliberately omitted from reports submitted to Congress. Speaking of Negroponte and other senior U.S. officials, an ex-Honduran congressman, Efraín Díaz, was quoted as saying: "Their attitude was one of tolerance and silence. They needed Honduras to loan its territory more than they were concerned about innocent people being killed."

Substantial evidence later emerged to support the contention that Negroponte knew serious violations of human rights were being committed by the Honduran government, yet did not recommend ending U.S. military aid to Honduras. Senator Christopher Dodd of Connecticut, on September 14, 2001, as reported in the Congressional Record, aired his concerns on the occasion of Negroponte's nomination to the position of UN ambassador:

Based upon the Committee's review of State Department and CIA documents, it would seem that Ambassador Negroponte knew far more about human rights abuses perpetrated by the Honduran government than he chose to share with the committee in 1989 or in embassy contributions at the time to annual State Department Human Rights reports.

Dodd cited a 1985 cable sent by Negroponte that made it clear that Negroponte was aware of and urged for reform to address the threat of "future human rights abuses" by "secret operating cells" left over by General Gustavo Álvarez Martínez, the chief of the Honduran armed forces, after he was forcibly removed from his post by fellow military commanders in 1984. The cables reveal that Negroponte repeatedly urged for updates to the Honduran criminal code and justice system to replace arbitrary measures taken by the Honduran government after events such as the destruction of the nation's main power plant at Tegucigalpa and the abduction of the entire business establishment of San Pedro Sula, Honduras' second largest city, in 1982. The previous U.S. ambassador to Honduras, Jack Binns, who was appointed by President Jimmy Carter, made numerous complaints about human rights abuses by the Honduran Army under the government of Policarpo Paz García. Binns later acknowledged that the Honduran Army was supported by military assistance from the Argentine junta and the CIA during the Carter administration, and that neither the Honduran government nor the CIA kept the embassy informed of what it was doing.

In April 2005, as the Senate confirmation hearings for the National Intelligence post were held, hundreds of documents were released by the State Department in response to a FOIA request by The Washington Post. The documents, cables that Negroponte sent to Washington while serving as ambassador to Honduras, indicated that he played a more active role than previously known in managing US efforts against the leftist Sandinista government next door in Nicaragua. According to the Post, the image of Negroponte that emerges from the cables is that of an:

exceptionally energetic, action-oriented ambassador whose anti-communist convictions led him to downplay human rights abuses in Honduras, the most reliable U.S. ally in the region. There is little in the documents the State Department has released so far to support his assertion that he used "quiet diplomacy" to persuade the Honduran authorities to investigate the most egregious violations, including the mysterious disappearance of dozens of government opponents.

The New York Times wrote that the documents revealed:

... a tough cold warrior who enthusiastically carried out President Ronald Reagan's strategy. They show he sent admiring reports to Washington about the Honduran Army chief, who was blamed for human rights violations, warned that peace talks with the Nicaraguan government might be a dangerous "Trojan horse" and pleaded with officials in Washington to impose greater secrecy on the Honduran role in aiding the contras.

The cables show that Mr. Negroponte worked closely with William J. Casey, then director of central intelligence, on the Reagan administration's anti-Communist offensive in Central America. He helped word a secret 1983 presidential "finding" authorizing support for the Contras, as the Nicaraguan rebels were known, and met regularly with Honduran military officials to win and retain their backing for the covert action.

Negroponte was opposed to early drafts of peace settlements on grounds that they would have left undisturbed the threat of expansion of the Nicaraguan armed forces with Soviet and Cuban aid. Negroponte also tried to undermine efforts by Costa Rican president Oscar Arias's Contadora peace initiative (for which Arias won a Nobel Prize). In his tenure in Honduras, Negroponte steered a middle course between State Department and journalists who favored a policy of nonresistance to the militarization of the Sandinista regime to power Nicaragua and its aid to rebel movements in Honduras and El Salvador and 'hard line' persons within the Reagan administration who would have involved the United States in Central America through actions such as blockades, bombing of Nicaraguan airfields, provision of offensive weapons, and installation of permanent military bases. However, a study of American policy has noted that:

the United States had a great deal to do with the preservation of Honduran stability. Had it not been for U.S. enticements and pressures, elections probably would not have been held in 1980 and 1981. The perpetuation of the military dictatorship would have undermined the legitimacy of the political order, making it far more vulnerable to revolutionary turmoil. By the same token, strong North American opposition to President Suazo's attempt to remain in power in 1985 helped preserve the fragile legitimacy that had been built over the preceding five years ... massive economic aid prevented the economy's collapse ... without the United States, it might well have disintegrated into chaos.

Following Bush-Gorbachev meetings beginning in 1986, both the U.S. and the Soviet Union ended military support for 'proxy wars' in Central America, and free elections in Nicaragua, Honduras and El Salvador followed. Senator Bill Bradley regarded the whole episode as "a minor issue--the supply of arms to the Nicaraguan contras, a policy that took on monumental proportions inside the Beltway and upon those liberals who saw another quagmire in every exercise of military power."

=== Assistant Secretary for Environment, Oceans and Fisheries (1985–1989) ===
In this posting, Negroponte together with Ambassador Richard Benedick negotiated the Montreal Protocol on Ozone, the most successful modern environmental treaty, overcoming opposition from Europe, Russia, and China and from some Reagan administration officials.

=== Ambassador to Mexico (1989–1993) ===
During Negroponte's tour as US Ambassador to Mexico, he was instrumental in persuading the Bush administration to respond to a Mexican initiative by negotiating the North American Free Trade Agreement (NAFTA) despite initial opposition by the U.S. Office of Trade Representative. His tenure in Mexico was thus the most consequential of any modern American ambassadorship. Another commentator noted the subsequent proliferation of Negroponte's vision in other free trade agreements. He officiated at the embassy where he liberalized visa practices.

=== Ambassador to the UN (2001–2004) ===
President George W. Bush nominated Negroponte to be U.S. ambassador to the United Nations in February 2001. There was substantial opposition to his nomination from Senate Democrats, and Negroponte was questioned over his knowledge of human rights abuses in Honduras while he was ambassador. His nomination was confirmed by the Senate on September 15, 2001, four days after the September 11 attacks on the United States. In the New York Review of Books, Stephen Kinzer reported that a State Department official told him that "Giving him this job is a way of telling the UN: 'We hate you.'" Negroponte, however, warned the Bush administration about the adverse consequences of intervening in Iraq.

Negroponte "was instrumental in winning unanimous approval of a Security Council resolution that demanded Saddam Hussein comply with U.N. mandates to disarm".

=== Ambassador to Iraq (2004–2005) ===
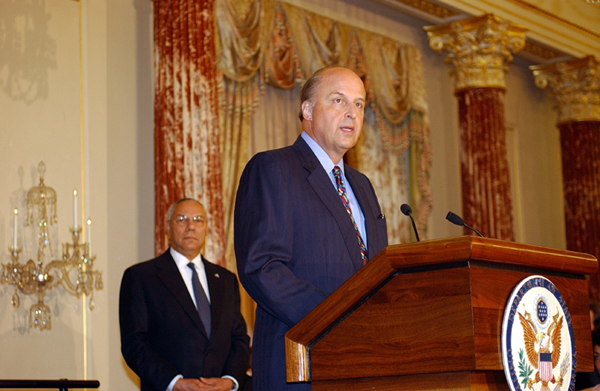
John D. Negroponte's remarks at swearing in ceremony as new U.S. Ambassador to Iraq

On April 19, 2004, Negroponte was nominated by U.S. President George W. Bush to be the United States Ambassador to Iraq after the June 30 transfer of sovereignty to the new Iraqi government. He was confirmed by the United States Senate on May 6, 2004, by a vote of 95 to 3, and was sworn in on June 23, 2004, replacing L. Paul Bremer as the U.S.'s highest ranking American civilian in Iraq. He advised the Bush administration that security had to precede reconstruction in Iraq, organized a peaceful election, and gave advice, equally unwelcome to Secretary Rumsfeld and Democrats in Congress, that a five-year commitment would be required.

=== Director of National Intelligence (2005–2007) ===
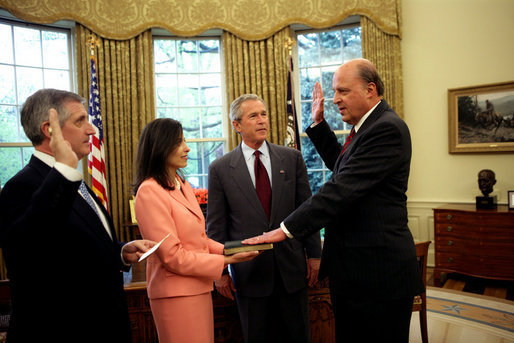
Negroponte's swearing in ceremony as DNI.

On February 17, 2005, President George W. Bush named Negroponte as the first Director of National Intelligence, (DNI), a cabinet-level position charged with coordinating the nation's Intelligence Community. On April 21, 2005, Negroponte was confirmed by a vote of 98 to 2 in the Senate, and subsequently sworn into the office that was called "substantially stronger" than its predecessor position, the Director of Central Intelligence. Part of its power stemmed from the ability to "determine" budgets, prompting President Bush to remark, "That's why John Negroponte is going to have a lot of influence. He will set the budgets." The budget of the Intelligence Community was estimated at $40 billion.

A memorandum in the Federal Register signed May 5, 2006 by President Bush states that Negroponte, as intelligence czar, be delegated the authority to exempt companies from accurate accounting standards, a power previously reserved for the chief executive under the 1934 Securities Exchange Act.

Reaction in the intelligence community to Negroponte's nomination was, according to Newsweek, "overwhelmingly positive" because he had "earned the respect of many intel professionals since those early days of the Reagan counterinsurgency." The Times noted, "if anyone can bring a semblance of unity to America's bewildering network of competing spy agencies, it is John Negroponte." According to John MacGaffin, the CIA's former associate deputy director for clandestine operations, "This is a guy who plays hardball. He's a man who understands the whole range of counterintelligence, intelligence and covert action. They're all parts of foreign policy and protecting ourselves."

Congressional reaction from Sen. Jay Rockefeller (D-WV), then-vice chairman of the Senate Intelligence Committee and Rep. Jane Harman (D-CA), then-ranking member of the House Intelligence Committee was positive.

As DNI, Negroponte, "embarked on an impressive array of reform efforts", with "perhaps the most transformational work ... [involving] the effort to retool the creaky electronic infrastructure of the intelligence community." One of Negroponte's first tests was on an over-budget satellite system. The $25 billion system, called the "Future Imagery Architecture", was created as the "foundation for the next generation of America's space-based surveillance efforts." The reality was quite different, as it became, "a managerial nightmare – five years behind schedule and billions over budget. Poor quality control and technical problems raised questions about whether the system would ever work properly." Negroponte jettisoned half the classified project.

Negroponte also appointed "mission managers" – intelligence professionals focused on America's hardest targets and most looming threats. The mission managers are focused on counterterrorism, counterproliferation, counterintelligence, Iran, North Korea, and Cuba and Venezuela. According to John McLaughlin, former Deputy Director of Central Intelligence (DDCI), the mission manager concept would likely facilitate integration of analysis, collection of information, and other intelligence activities. The mission manager concept was found to be beneficial during potential crises, such as in the days immediately following North Korea's 2006 nuclear test.

Progress made included the White House approval of more than 30 DNI recommendations on improving the flow of intelligence and terrorism data to state and local authorities; requiring intelligence agencies to accept each other's clearance; efforts to prevent groupthink; creation of an analytic ombudsman position; establishment of an Open Source center; and more "red teams" to challenge conventional thinking. The President's Daily Brief, the highly classified report given to the President each morning by Negroponte, once prepared solely by the Central Intelligence Agency, is now compiled from intelligence agencies across the government.

In spite of his progress leading the Intelligence Community, though, Negroponte wanted to return to the field in which he spent 37 years – the State Department and Foreign Service. On January 5, 2007, Negroponte announced his resignation as DNI and move to the State Department to serve as Deputy Secretary of State.

According to Newsweek, "Under Negroponte, the intel czar's office was praised by both congressional and executive-branch officials for greatly improving—via its National Counterterrorism Center—the sharing among relevant agencies of intelligence reports about terror threats."

=== U.S. Deputy Secretary of State (2007–2009) ===
On January 5, 2007, Negroponte announced his resignation as Director of National Intelligence and nomination to serve as Deputy Secretary of State under Secretary Condoleezza Rice. President George W. Bush swore him in on February 27, 2007, at the U.S. Department of State in the Benjamin Franklin Room.

As Deputy Secretary, Negroponte served as the principal deputy and adviser to the Secretary of State, acting as chief operating officer of the State Department and overseeing the formulation and conduct of U.S. foreign policy. President Bush emphasized at his swearing-in that Negroponte would "help guide diplomats deployed around the globe" and "work with Secretary Rice and the leaders of other federal agencies to ensure that America speaks with one voice."

==== Iraq policy and reconstruction ====
Negroponte played a central role in Iraq policy during the Iraq War, drawing on his previous experience as U.S. Ambassador to Iraq. In December 2007, he conducted an extensive six-day tour of Iraq, visiting nine locations across eight provinces—including Basrah, Fallujah, Ramadi, and Baghdad. During this visit, he met with over half of the Provincial Reconstruction Teams operating in Iraq, and emphasized the importance of following security gains with political reconciliation, warning that without progress, Iraq risked "falling back to the more violent patterns of the past."

Negroponte advocated for the International Compact with Iraq, a comprehensive economic reform initiative involving more than 70 countries and international organizations. He also promoted the Economic Empowerment in Strategic Regions Initiative, designed to harness private sector development in conflict areas—including the Pakistan-Afghanistan border region, Iraq, and Mindanao in the Philippines.

==== Economic diplomacy and trade policy ====
Under Negroponte's leadership, the State Department pursued an aggressive economic diplomacy agenda. He championed the approval of four pending free trade agreements with Peru, Colombia, Panama, and South Korea, arguing that their defeat would represent "a victory for Hugo Chávez of Venezuela." During his tenure, he noted that the Bush administration had negotiated more free trade agreements than all previous administrations combined, including agreements with the Dominican Republic, Central America (CAFTA-DR), Australia, Bahrain, Chile, Jordan, Morocco, Oman, and Singapore.

Negroponte also promoted Reconstruction Opportunity Zones for Afghanistan, and earthquake-affected regions of Pakistan, designed to allow duty-free entry of certain products to create job opportunities and counter extremism.

==== U.S.–China relations ====
A significant component of Negroponte's portfolio involved managing the U.S.-China Senior Dialogue, a high-level diplomatic mechanism for bilateral consultation. He co-chaired the sixth round of the Senior Dialogue with Chinese State Councilor Dai Bingguo in Washington, D.C., on December 15, 2008. In January 2009, near the end of his tenure, Negroponte traveled to Beijing to attend events commemorating the 30th anniversary of U.S.-China diplomatic relations, reflecting on the dramatic transformation in bilateral ties since his first visit to China in 1972 as part of a delegation led by Henry Kissinger.

==== Other diplomatic initiatives ====
Negroponte oversaw diplomatic engagement across multiple regions during a period of global challenges. He participated in the dedication ceremony for the new U.S. Embassy in Baghdad on January 5, 2009, and traveled to Pakistan in December 2008 for a memorial ceremony honoring American personnel killed in the 2008 Marriott Hotel bombing in Islamabad. He also conducted diplomatic missions to Ireland, Northern Ireland, and various other countries to advance U.S. foreign policy objectives.

Negroponte's tenure concluded on January 20, 2009, with the end of the Bush administration and the inauguration of President Barack Obama.

=== Later career ===
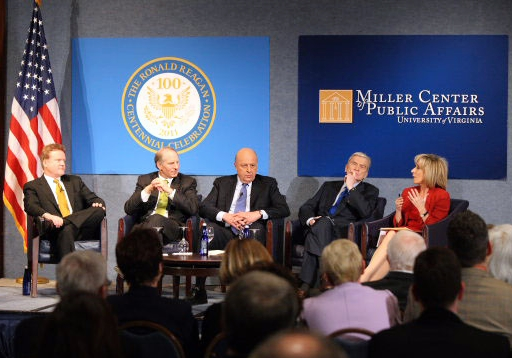
Senator Jim Webb, CFR President Richard N. Haass, former Deputy Secretary of State John Negroponte, Senator John Warner, and Andrea Mitchell at Ronald Reagan Centennial Roundtable in 2011

Negroponte joined McLarty Associates, an international strategic advisory firm headquartered in Washington, D.C., in 2009. He serves on the Leadership Council of Concordia, a think tank based in New York City focused on promoting effective public–private collaboration for greater sustainability.

=== Opposition to Trump ===
Negroponte was one of 50 signatories of a statement concerning 2016 Republican presidential candidate Donald Trump in which Trump was called "reckless" and stated that he would "put at risk our country's national security and well-being." In 2020, Negroponte, along with over 130 other former Republican national security officials, signed a statement that asserted that President Trump was unfit to serve another term, and "To that end, we are firmly convinced that it is in the best interest of our nation that Vice President Joe Biden be elected as the next President of the United States, and we will vote for him."

== Personal life ==
Negroponte speaks five languages (English, French, Greek, Spanish, and Vietnamese). He is the elder brother of Nicholas Negroponte, founder of the Massachusetts Institute of Technology's Media Lab and of the One Laptop per Child project. His brother Michel is an Emmy Award-winning filmmaker, and his other brother, George Negroponte, is an artist and was president of the Drawing Center of New York City from 2002 to 2007. Negroponte and his wife, Diana Mary Villiers (born August 14, 1947), have five adopted children, Marina, Alexandra, John, George and Sophia, all of whom were adopted from Honduras. Negroponte and his wife were married on December 14, 1971.

== Recognition ==
- National Security Medal
- State Department Secretary's Distinguished Service Award with gold service star (in lieu of second award)
- Lifetime Achievement Award, World Affairs Councils of America
- Raymond "Jit" Trainor Award for Distinction in the Conduct of Diplomacy, Georgetown University, Institute for the Study of Diplomacy (2005)
- Golden Plate Award of the American Academy of Achievement presented by Awards Council member President Vaira Vīķe-Freiberga of Latvia (2006)
- George F. Kennan Award for Distinguished Public Service, National Committee on American Foreign Policy (2011)
- Distinguished Service Award for the Advancement of Public Discourse on Foreign Policy, American Committees on Foreign Relations (2014)
- Walter and Leonore Annenberg Award for Excellence in Diplomacy, The American Academy of Diplomacy (2019)

== See also ==
- Negroponte doctrine
- The Ambassador (2005), Norwegian documentary film that examines the career of John Negroponte, focusing primarily on his time as U.S. Ambassador to Honduras in the early 1980s
- Battalion 316, Honduran army unit responsible for carrying out political assassinations and torture of suspected political opponents of the government during the 1980s
- Iran–Contra affair
- List of U.S. political appointments that crossed party lines

Diplomatic posts
Preceded by Jack R. Binns	United States Ambassador to Honduras; 1981–1985	Succeeded by John A. Ferch
Preceded by Charles J. Pilliod Jr.	United States Ambassador to Mexico; 1989–1993	Succeeded by James R. Jones
Preceded by Richard H. Solomon	United States Ambassador to the Philippines; 1993–1996	Succeeded by Thomas C. Hubbard
Preceded by James B. Cunningham; Acting	United States Ambassador to the United Nations; 2001–2004	Succeeded by John Danforth
Preceded by Krzysztof Biernacki; Acting	United States Ambassador to Iraq; 2004–2005	Succeeded by Zalmay Khalilzad
Political offices
Preceded by James L. Malone	Assistant Secretary of State for Oceans and International Environmental and Scientific Affairs; 1985–1987	Succeeded by Frederick M. Bernthal
Preceded by Colin Powell	Deputy National Security Advisor; 1987–1989	Succeeded by Robert Gates
Preceded by Robert Zoellick	United States Deputy Secretary of State; 2007–2009	Succeeded by Jim Steinberg
Government offices
New office	United States Director of National Intelligence; 2005–2007	Succeeded by Mike McConnell
