= List of foreign ministers in 2009 =

This is a list of foreign ministers in 2009.

== Africa ==
- Algeria - Mourad Medelci (2007–2013)
- Angola - Assunção dos Anjos (2008–2010)
- Benin - Jean-Marie Ehouzou (2008–2011)
- Botswana - Phandu Skelemani (2008–2014)
- Burkina Faso - Alain Bédouma Yoda (2008–2011)
- Burundi -
  1. Antoinette Batumubwira (2005–2009)
  2. Augustin Nsanze (2009–2011)
- Cameroon - Henri Eyebe Ayissi (2007–2011)
- Cape Verde - José Brito (2008–2011)
- Central African Republic -
  1. Dieudonné Kombo Yaya (2008–2009)
  2. Antoine Gambi (2009–2013)
- Chad - Moussa Faki (2008–2017)
- Comoros - Ahmed Ben Said Jaffar (2006–2010)
- Republic of Congo - Basile Ikouébé (2007–2015)
- Democratic Republic of Congo - Alexis Thambwe Mwamba (2008–2012)
- Côte d'Ivoire - Youssouf Bakayoko (2006–2010)
- Djibouti - Mahamoud Ali Youssouf (2005–present)
- Egypt - Ahmed Aboul Gheit (2004–2011)
- Equatorial Guinea - Pastor Micha Ondó Bile (2003–2012)
- Eritrea - Osman Saleh Mohammed (2007–present)
- Ethiopia - Seyoum Mesfin (1991–2010)
- Gabon - Paul Toungui (2008–2012)
- The Gambia -
  1. Omar Touray (2008–2009)
  2. Ousman Jammeh (2009–2010)
- Ghana -
  1. Akwasi Osei-Adjei (2007–2009)
  2. Muhammad Mumuni (2009–2013)
- Guinea -
  1. Amadou Lamarana Bah (2008–2009)
  2. Alexandre Cécé Loua (2009–2010)
- Guinea-Bissau -
  1. Maria da Conceição Nobre Cabral (2007–2009)
  2. Adiato Djaló Nandigna (2009)
  3. Adelino Mano Quetá (2009–2011)
- Kenya - Moses Wetangula (2008–2012)
- Lesotho - Mohlabi Tsekoa (2007–2015)
- Liberia - Olubanke King-Akerele (2007–2010)
- Libya -
  1. Abdel Rahman Shalgham (2000–2009)
  2. Moussa Koussa (2009–2011)
- Madagascar -
  1. Marcel Ranjeva (2002–2009)
  2. Ny Hasina Andriamanjato (2009–2010)
- Malawi -
  1. Joyce Banda (2006–2009)
  2. Etta Banda (2009–2011)
- Mali - Moctar Ouane (2004–2011)
- Mauritania -
  1. Mohamed Mahmoud Ould Mohamedou (2008–2009)
  2. Naha Mint Mouknass (2009–2011)
- Mauritius - Arvin Boolell (2008–2014)
- Morocco - Taieb Fassi Fihri (2007–2012)
  - Western Sahara - Mohamed Salem Ould Salek (1998–2023)
- Mozambique - Oldemiro Balói (2008–2017)
- Namibia - Marco Hausiku (2004–2010)
- Niger - Aïchatou Mindaoudou (2001–2010)
- Nigeria - Ojo Maduekwe (2007–2010)
- Rwanda -
  1. Rosemary Museminari (2008–2009)
  2. Louise Mushikiwabo (2009–2018)
- São Tomé and Príncipe - Carlos Tiny (2008–2010)
- Senegal -
  1. Cheikh Tidiane Gadio (2000–2009)
  2. Madické Niang (2009–2012)
- Seychelles -
  1. Patrick Pillay (2005–2009)
  2. James Michel (2009–2010)
- Sierra Leone - Zainab Bangura (2007–2010)
- Somalia -
  1. Ali Ahmed Jama Jangali (2008–2009)
  2. Mohamed Abdullahi Omar (2009)
  3. Ali Ahmed Jama Jangali (2009–2010)
  - Somaliland - Abdillahi Mohamed Duale (2006–2010)
  - Puntland - Farah Adan Dhala (2009–2010)
- South Africa -
  1. Nkosazana Dlamini-Zuma (1999–2009)
  2. Maite Nkoana-Mashabane (2009–2018)
- Sudan - Deng Alor (2007–2010)
- Swaziland - Lutfo Dlamini (2008–2011)
- Tanzania – Bernard Membe (2007–2015)
- Togo - Kofi Esaw (2008–2010)
- Tunisia - Abdelwahab Abdallah (2005–2010)
- Uganda - Sam Kutesa (2005–2021)
- Zambia - Kabinga Pande (2007–2011)
- Zimbabwe - Simbarashe Mumbengegwi (2005–2017)

== Asia ==
- Afghanistan - Rangin Dadfar Spanta (2006–2010)
- Armenia - Eduard Nalbandyan (2008–2018)
- Azerbaijan - Elmar Mammadyarov (2004–2020)
  - Nagorno-Karabakh - Georgy Petrosyan (2005–2011)
- Bahrain - Sheikh Khalid ibn Ahmad Al Khalifah (2005–2020)
- Bangladesh –
  1. Iftekhar Ahmed Chowdhury (2007–2009)
  2. Dipu Moni (2009–2013)
- Bhutan - Ugyen Tshering (2008–2013)
- Brunei - Pengiran Muda Mohamed Bolkiah (1984–2015)
- Cambodia - Hor Namhong (1998–2016)
- China - Yang Jiechi (2007–2013)
- East Timor - Zacarias da Costa (2007–2012)
- Georgia - Grigol Vashadze (2008–2012)
  - Abkhazia - Sergei Shamba (2004–2010)
  - South Ossetia - Murat Dzhioyev (1998–2012)
- India -
  1. Pranab Mukherjee (2006–2009)
  2. S. M. Krishna (2009–2012)
- Indonesia -
  1. Hassan Wirajuda (2001–2009)
  2. Marty Natalegawa (2009–2014)
- Iran - Manouchehr Mottaki (2005–2010)
- Iraq - Hoshyar Zebari (2003–2014)
  - Kurdistan - Falah Mustafa Bakir (2006–2019)
- Israel -
  1. Tzipi Livni (2006–2009)
  2. Avigdor Lieberman (2009–2012)
  - Palestinian Authority - Riyad al-Maliki (2007–present)
- Japan -
  1. Hirofumi Nakasone (2008–2009)
  2. Katsuya Okada (2009–2010)
- Jordan -
  1. Salah Bashir (2007–2009)
  2. Nasser Judeh (2009–2017)
- Kazakhstan –
  1. Marat Tazhin (2007–2009)
  2. Kanat Saudabayev (2009–2011)
- North Korea - Pak Ui-chun (2007–2014)
- South Korea - Yu Myung-hwan (2008–2010)
- Kuwait - Sheikh Mohammad Sabah Al-Salem Al-Sabah (2003–2011)
- Kyrgyzstan -
  1. Ednan Karabayev (2007–2009)
  2. Kadyrbek Sarbayev (2009–2010)
- Laos - Thongloun Sisoulith (2006–2016)
- Lebanon -
  1. Fawzi Salloukh (2005–2009)
  2. Ali Al Shami (2009–2011)
- Malaysia -
  1. Rais Yatim (2008–2009)
  2. Anifah Aman (2009–2018)
- Maldives - Ahmed Shaheed (2008–2011)
- Mongolia -
  1. Sükhbaataryn Batbold (2008–2009)
  2. Gombojavyn Zandanshatar (2009–2012)
- Myanmar - Nyan Win (2004–2011)
- Nepal -
  1. Upendra Yadav (2008–2009)
  2. Sujata Koirala (2009–2011)
- Oman - Yusuf bin Alawi bin Abdullah (1982–2020)
- Pakistan - Shah Mehmood Qureshi (2008–2011)
- Philippines - Alberto Romulo (2004–2011)
- Qatar - Sheikh Hamad bin Jassim bin Jaber Al Thani (1992–2013)
- Saudi Arabia - Prince Saud bin Faisal bin Abdulaziz Al Saud (1975–2015)
- Singapore - George Yeo (2004–2011)
- Sri Lanka - Rohitha Bogollagama (2007–2010)
- Syria - Walid Muallem (2006–2020)
- Taiwan -
  1. Francisco Ou (2008–2009)
  2. Timothy Yang (2009–2012)
- Tajikistan - Khamrokhon Zaripov (2006–2013)
- Thailand - Kasit Piromya (2008–2011)
- Turkey -
  1. Ali Babacan (2007–2009)
  2. Ahmet Davutoğlu (2009–2014)
- Turkmenistan - Raşit Meredow (2001–present)
- United Arab Emirates - Sheikh Abdullah bin Zayed Al Nahyan (2006–present)
- Uzbekistan - Vladimir Norov (2006–2010)
- Vietnam - Phạm Gia Khiêm (2006–2011)
- Yemen - Abu Bakr al-Qirbi (2001–2014)

== Europe ==
- Albania -
  1. Lulzim Basha (2007–2009)
  2. Ilir Meta (2009–2010)
- Andorra -
  1. Meritxell Mateu i Pi (2007–2009)
  2. Xavier Espot Miró (2009–2011)
- Austria - Michael Spindelegger (2008–2013)
- Belarus - Sergei Martynov (2003–2012)
- Belgium -
  1. Karel De Gucht (2004–2009)
  2. Yves Leterme (2009)
  3. Steven Vanackere (2009–2011)
  - Brussels-Capital Region -
    1. Guy Vanhengel (2000–2009)
    2. Jean-Luc Vanraes (2009–2013)
  - Flanders - Kris Peeters (2008–2014)
  - Wallonia -
    1. Marie-Dominique Simonet (2004–2009)
    2. Rudy Demotte (2009–2014)
- Bosnia and Herzegovina - Sven Alkalaj (2007–2012)
- Bulgaria -
  1. Ivailo Kalfin (2005–2009)
  2. Rumiana Jeleva (2009–2010)
- Croatia - Gordan Jandroković (2008–2011)
- Cyprus - Markos Kyprianou (2008–2011)
  - Northern Cyprus
    1. Turgay Avcı (2006–2009)
    2. Hüseyin Özgürgün (2009–2013)
- Czech Republic
  1. Karel Schwarzenberg (2007–2009)
  2. Jan Kohout (2009–2010)
- Denmark - Per Stig Møller (2001–2010)
  - Greenland -
    1. Per Berthelsen (2008–2009)
    2. Kuupik Kleist (2009–2013)
  - Faroe Islands - Jørgen Niclasen (2008–2011)
- Estonia - Urmas Paet (2005–2014)
- Finland - Alexander Stubb (2008–2011)
- France - Bernard Kouchner (2007–2010)
- Germany -
  1. Frank-Walter Steinmeier (2005–2009)
  2. Guido Westerwelle (2009–2013)
- Greece -
  1. Dora Bakoyannis (2006–2009)
  2. George Papandreou (2009–2010)
- Hungary -
  1. Kinga Göncz (2006–2009)
  2. Péter Balázs (2009–2010)
- Iceland -
  1. Ingibjörg Sólrún Gísladóttir (2007–2009)
  2. Össur Skarphéðinsson (2009–2013)
- Ireland - Micheál Martin (2008–2011)
- Italy - Franco Frattini (2008–2011)
- Latvia - Māris Riekstiņš (2007–2010)
- Liechtenstein -
  1. Rita Kieber-Beck (2005–2009)
  2. Aurelia Frick (2009–2019)
- Lithuania - Vygaudas Ušackas (2008–2010)
- Luxembourg - Jean Asselborn (2004–present)
- Republic of Macedonia - Antonio Milošoski (2006–2011)
- Malta - Tonio Borg (2008–2012)
- Moldova -
  1. Andrei Stratan (2004–2009)
  2. Iurie Leancă (2009–2013)
  - Transnistria - Vladimir Yastrebchak (2008–2012)
- Monaco - Franck Biancheri (2008–2011)
- Montenegro - Milan Roćen (2006–2012)
- Netherlands - Maxime Verhagen (2007–2010)
- Norway - Jonas Gahr Støre (2005–2012)
- Poland - Radosław Sikorski (2007–2014)
- Portugal - Luís Amado (2006–2011)
- Romania -
  1. Cristian Diaconescu (2008–2009)
  2. Cătălin Predoiu (acting) (2009)
  3. Teodor Baconschi (2009–2012)
- Russia - Sergey Lavrov (2004–present)
- San Marino - Antonella Mularoni (2008–2012)
- Serbia - Vuk Jeremić (2007–2012)
  - Kosovo - Skënder Hyseni (2008–2010)
- Slovakia -
  1. Ján Kubiš (2006–2009)
  2. Miroslav Lajčák (2009–2010)
- Slovenia - Samuel Žbogar (2008–2012)
- Spain - Miguel Ángel Moratinos (2004–2010)
- Sweden - Carl Bildt (2006–2014)
- Switzerland - Micheline Calmy-Rey (2003–2011)
- Ukraine -
  1. Volodymyr Ohryzko (2007–2009)
  2. Volodymyr Khandohiy (acting) (2009)
  3. Petro Poroshenko (2009–2010)
- United Kingdom - David Miliband (2007–2010)
  - Scotland -
  1. Linda Fabiani (2007–2009)
  2. Michael Russell (2009)
  3. Fiona Hyslop (2009–2020)
- Vatican City - Archbishop Dominique Mamberti (2006–2014)

== North America and the Caribbean ==
- Antigua and Barbuda - Baldwin Spencer (2005–2014)
- The Bahamas - Brent Symonette (2007–2012)
- Barbados - Maxine McClean (2008–2018)
- Belize - Wilfred Elrington (2008–2020)
- Canada - Lawrence Cannon (2008–2011)
  - Quebec - Pierre Arcand (2008–2010)
- Costa Rica - Bruno Stagno Ugarte (2006–2010)
- Cuba -
  1. Felipe Pérez Roque (1999–2009)
  2. Bruno Rodríguez Parrilla (2009–present)
- Dominica - Vince Henderson (2008–2010)
- Dominican Republic - Carlos Morales Troncoso (2004–2014)
- El Salvador -
  1. Marisol Argueta de Barillas (2008–2009)
  2. Hugo Martínez (2009–2013)
- Grenada - Peter David (2008–2010)
- Guatemala - Haroldo Rodas (2008–2012)
- Haiti -
  1. Alrich Nicolas (2008–2009)
  2. Marie-Michèle Rey (2009–2011)
- Honduras -
  1. Ángel Edmundo Orellana (2008–2009)
  2. Patricia Rodas (2009)
  3. Enrique Ortez (2009)
  4. Carlos López Contreras (2009–2010)
- Jamaica - Kenneth Baugh (2007–2012)
- Mexico - Patricia Espinosa (2006–2012)
- Netherlands Antilles - Emily de Jongh-Elhage (2006–2010)
- Nicaragua - Samuel Santos López (2007–2017)
- Panama -
  1. Samuel Lewis Navarro (2004–2009)
  2. Juan Carlos Varela (2009–2011)
- Puerto Rico –
  1. Fernando Bonilla (2005–2009)
  2. Kenneth McClintock (2009–2013)
- Saint Kitts and Nevis - Denzil Douglas (2008–2010)
- Saint Lucia -
  1. Stephenson King (2007–2009)
  2. Rufus Bousquet (2009–2011)
- Saint Vincent and the Grenadines - Sir Louis Straker (2005–2010)
- Trinidad and Tobago - Paula Gopee-Scoon (2007–2010)
- United States of America -
  1. Condoleezza Rice (2005–2009)
  2. William J. Burns (acting) (2009)
  3. Hillary Clinton (2009–2013)

== Oceania ==
- Australia - Stephen Smith (2007–2010)
- Fiji -
  1. Frank Bainimarama (2008–2009)
  2. Ratu Inoke Kubuabola (2009–2016)
- French Polynesia -
  1. Gaston Tong Sang (2008–2009)
  2. Oscar Temaru (2009)
  3. Gaston Tong Sang (2009–2011)
- Kiribati - Anote Tong (2003–2016)
- Marshall Islands -
  1. Tony deBrum (2008–2009)
  2. John Silk (2009–2012)
- Micronesia - Lorin S. Robert (2007–2019)
- Nauru - Kieren Keke (2007–2011)
- New Zealand - Murray McCully (2008–2017)
  - Cook Islands -
    1. Wilkie Rasmussen (2005–2009)
    2. Jim Marurai (2009)
    3. Sir Terepai Maoate (2009)
    4. Jim Marurai (2009–2010)
  - Niue - Toke Talagi (2008–2020)
  - Tokelau -
    1. Pio Tuia (2008–2009)
    2. Foua Toloa (2009–2010)
- Palau -
  1. Temmy Shmull (2001–2009)
  2. Sandra Pierantozzi (2009–2010)
- Papua New Guinea - Sam Abal (2007–2010)
- Samoa - Tuilaepa Aiono Sailele Malielegaoi (1998–2021)
- Solomon Islands - William Haomae (2007–2010)
- Tonga -
  1. Sonatane Tu'a Taumoepeau Tupou (2004–2009)
  2. Feleti Sevele (2009–2010)
- Tuvalu - Apisai Ielemia (2006–2010)
- Vanuatu -
  1. Pakoa Kaltonga (2008–2009)
  2. Joe Natuman (2009–2010)

== South America ==
- Argentina - Jorge Taiana (2005–2010)
- Bolivia - David Choquehuanca (2006–2017)
- Brazil - Celso Amorim (2003–2011)
- Chile -
  1. Alejandro Foxley (2006–2009)
  2. Mariano Fernández Amunátegui (2009–2010)
- Colombia - Jaime Bermúdez (2008–2010)
- Ecuador - Fander Falconí (2008–2010)
- Guyana - Carolyn Rodrigues (2008–2015)
- Paraguay -
  1. Alejandro Hamed (2008–2009)
  2. Héctor Lacognata (2009–2011)
- Peru - JJosé Antonio García Belaúnde (2006–2011)
- Suriname - Lygia Kraag-Keteldijk (2005–2010)
- Uruguay -
  1. Gonzalo Fernández (2008–2009)
  2. Pedro Vaz (2009–2010)
- Venezuela - Nicolás Maduro (2006–2013)
