= Minister of Foreign Affairs (Honduras) =

This is a list of foreign ministers of Honduras from 1944 to the present day.

- 1944–1948: Silverio Laínez
- 1948–1954: J. Edgardo Valenzuela
- 1954–1956: Esteban Mendoza
- 1956–1957: Jorge Fidel Durón
- 1957–1962: Andrés Alvarado Puerto
- 1962–1963: Roberto Perdomo Paredes
- 1963–1965: Jorge Fidel Durón
- 1965–1965 José Ángel Ulloa Donaire
- 1965–1971: Tiburcio Carías Castillo
- 1971–1972: Andrés Alvarado Puerto
- 1972–1974: César A. Batres
- 1974–1975: Ricardo Pineda Milla
- 1975–1976: Virgilio Gálvez
- 1976–1976 Roberto Perdomo Paredes
- 1976–1979: Roberto Palma Gálvez
- 1979–1980: Eliseo Pérez Cadalso
- 1980–1982: César Elvir Sierra
- 1982–1986: Edgardo Paz Barnica
- 1986–1990: Carlos López Contreras
- 1990–1994: Mario Carías Zapata
- 1994–1995: Ernesto Paz Aguilar
- 1995–1998: Delmer Urbizo Panting
- 1998–1999: Fernando Martínez Jiménez
- 1999–2002: Roberto Flores Bermúdez
- 2002–2003: Guillermo Pérez Arias
- 2003–2003 Aníbal Quiñónez
- 2003–2005: Leónidas Rosa Bautista
- 2005–2006: Mario Fortín
- 2006–2008: Milton Jiménez
- 2008–2009: Ángel Edmundo Orellana
- 2009–2009 Patricia Rodas
- 2009–2009 Enrique Ortez
- 2009–2010: Carlos López Contreras
- 2010–2011: Mario Canahuati
- 2011–2011 Alden Rivera (acting)
- 2011–2013: Arturo Corrales
- 2013–2015: Mireya Agüero
- 2015–2016: Arturo Corrales
- 2016–2019: María Dolores Agüero
- 2019–2022: Lisandro Rosales
- 2022–2025: Eduardo Enrique Reina
- 2025–2026: Javier Efraín Bú
- 2026 – : Mireya Agüero

== Sources ==
- Rulers.org – Foreign ministers E–K
