= Edmundo Orellana =

Honduran politician

Angel Edmundo Orellana Mercado (born 20 October 1948) was born in Juticalpa. He is a Honduran lawyer and politician. He served as deputy of the National Congress of Honduras representing the Liberal Party of Honduras for Francisco Morazán. Orellana is a lawyer and a notary public, and has a Ph.D. from the University of Bologna, Italy. He was also foreign minister and defense minister of Honduras under the government of Manuel Zelaya. Due to his knowledge of law, Orellana was appointed as a diplomat representing Honduras in the United Nations. In the current years, the National University of Honduras hired Edmundo Orellana to teach public administration in that same institution. Orellana is one of the most prolific politicians of Honduras, one of the most loyal people in The Liberal Party of Honduras. He did not support the fourth ballot, which President Zelaya proposed.

charges in the public administration
Foreign Minister
defense Minister
Attorney general

Political offices
Preceded by Arístides Mejía	Defense Minister of Honduras; 2009	Succeeded by Adolfo Lionel Sevilla (Acting)
Preceded by Milton Jiménez	Foreign Minister of Honduras; 2008-2009	Succeeded by Patricia Rodas
