= Mario Canahuati =

Honduran politician

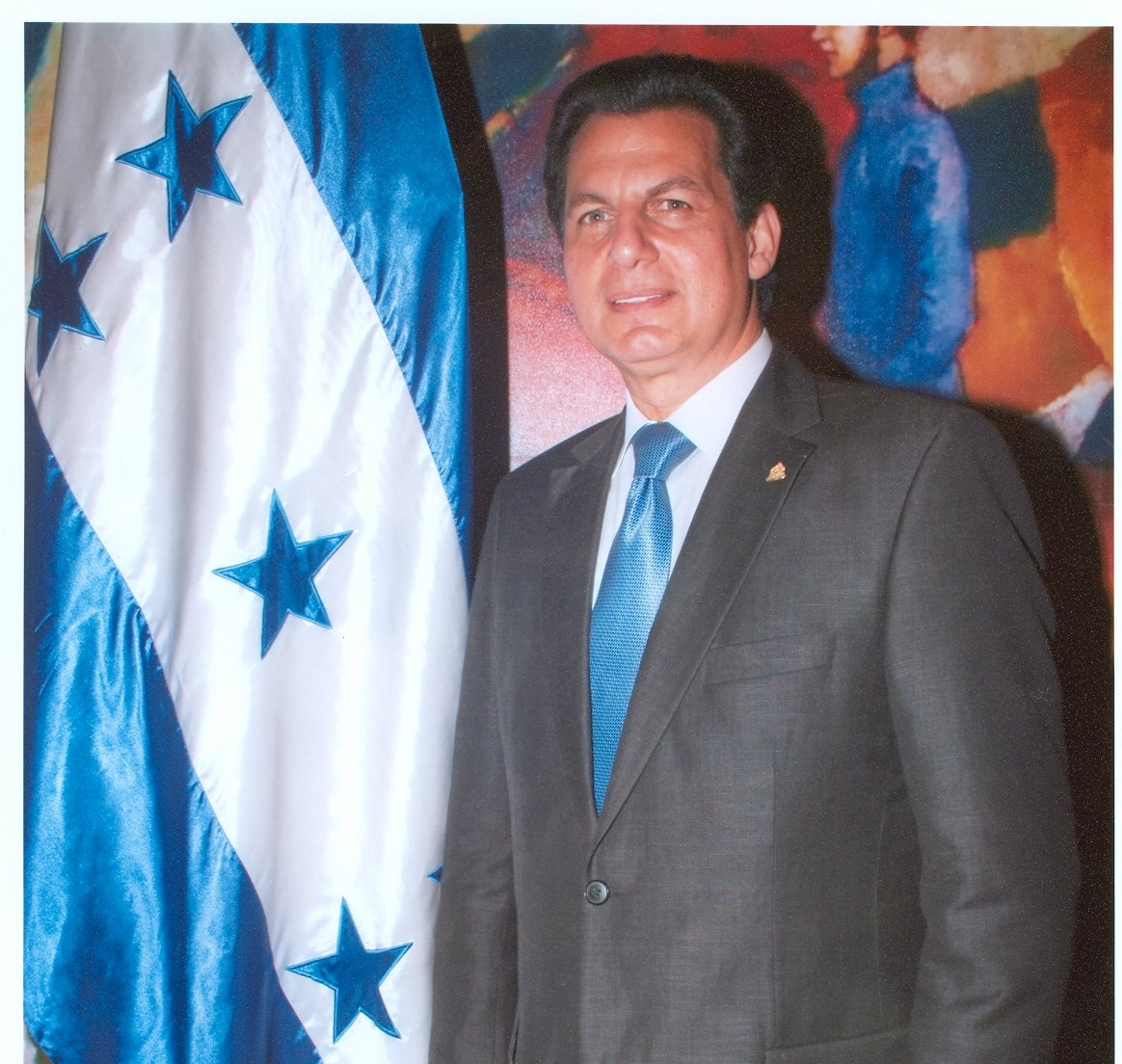

Mario Canahuati is a Honduran politician, businessman and a former Honduran ambassador to the United States. He is a former president of the Honduran Council of Private Enterprise (COHEP).

Representing the National Party of Honduras, Canahuati was the vice-presidential candidate of Porfirio Lobo Sosa in the 2005 Honduran general election, which Manuel Zelaya won. He served as Foreign Minister under President Porfirio Lobo Sosa from 2010 to 2011.

Canahuati is of Palestinian and Greek descent. He graduated from the Georgia Institute of Technology with a degree in industrial engineering in 1977.

Political offices
Preceded by Carlos López Contreras (Acting)	Foreign Minister of Honduras; 2010-2011	Succeeded by Arturo Corrales
