= Adolfo Lionel Sevilla =

Honduran politician

Adolfo Lionel Sevilla was the acting Defense Minister of Honduras under the interim government of Roberto Micheletti. He served in that position until February 24, 2010. He had previously been Deputy Minister of Defence. He is a member of the Liberal Party of Honduras.

Political offices
Preceded by Edmundo Orellana	Defense Minister of Honduras (Acting); 2009–2010	Succeeded by Marlon Pascua
