= María Dolores Agüero =

Honduran politician (born 1982)

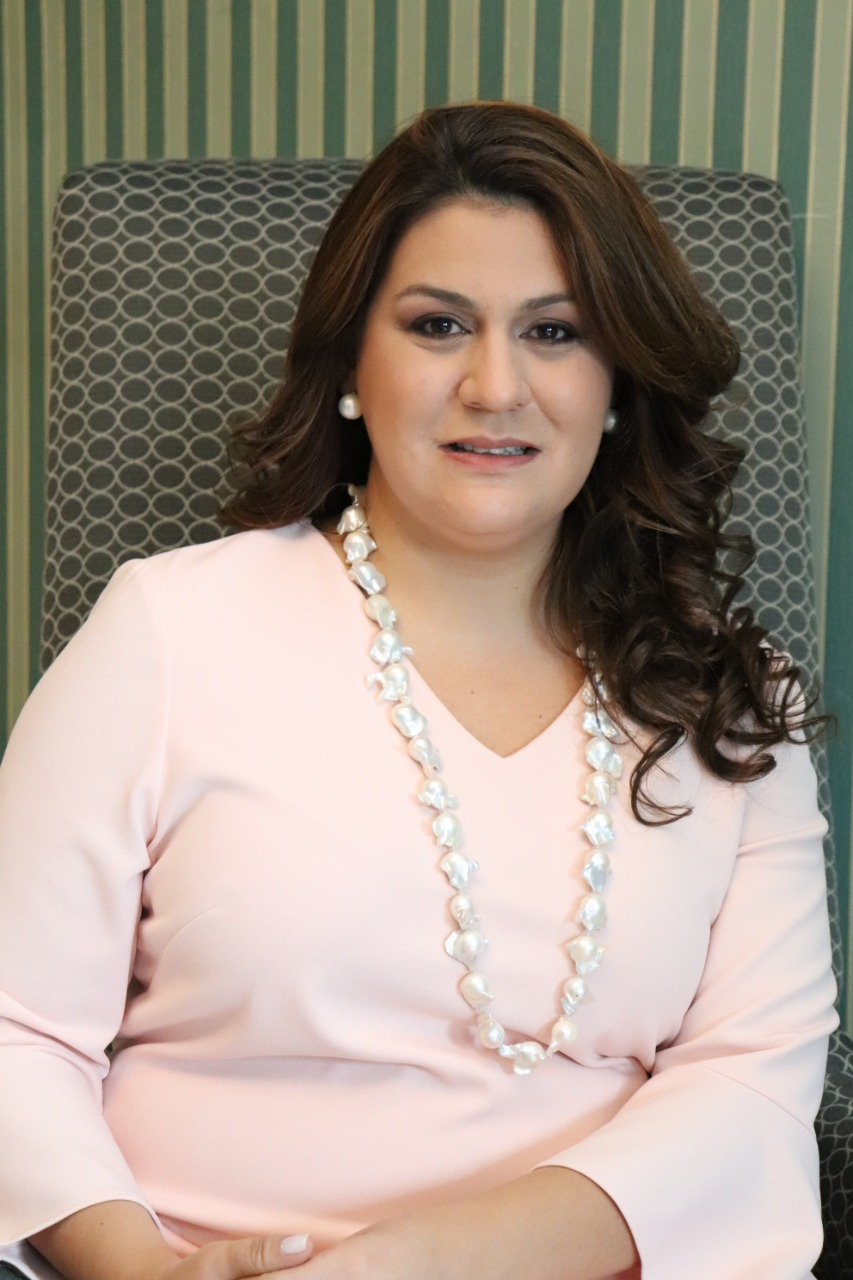
- Agüero in 2018

Minister of Foreign Affairs
- In office 27 March 2017 – 23 July 2019
- Preceded by: Arturo Corrales
- Succeeded by: Lisandro Rosales

Vice Minister of Foreign Affairs
- In office December 2015 – April 2016

Personal details
- Born: 1982 (age 43–44)

Marïa Dolores Agüero Lara (born 1982) is a Honduran politician who served as acting Foreign Minister from 14 April 2016 and was officially appointed as Minister of Foreign Affairs of Honduras on 27 March 2017 and served until 23 July 2019.

== Early life and education ==
Agüero's father is the vice president of Banco Atlántida. She has a brother and a sister. Agüero has degrees in Legal Sciences and International Law from the Universidad Nacional Autónoma de Honduras and a master's degree in International Law from the University of Chile and Heidelberg University.

== Career ==
Agüero was a legal advisor to the Honduran Private Business Council and an associate at Lópes Rodezno law firm. She began working at the Ministry of Foreign Affairs and International Cooperation in 2010, and in 2013 joined the Diplomatic and Consular Service of Honduras.

Agüero was appointed Vice Minister of Foreign Affairs in December 2015 and became acting Foreign Minister under President Juan Orlando Hernandez in April 2016 after the resignation of Arturo Corrales. She was officially appointed as Minister on 27 March 2017. In July 2019 she was succeeded by Lisandro Rosales.

== Personal life ==
She is the niece of former Foreign Affairs minister Mireya Agüero.
