= Gabriel Fino Noriega =

Honduran journalist and radio presenter

Gabriel Fino Noriega (born 1966 - died 2009) was a Honduran journalist and radio presenter who presented a daily news show on Radio Estelar. He also worked for Radio America (Honduras). He was shot multiple times and died on July 3, 2009 in San Juan Pueblo, near La Ceiba in the early days of the 2009 Honduran constitutional crisis. Noriega was in favour of a constituent assembly and opposed to the 2009 coup d'état. Local human rights organisation COFADEH attributed the assassination to the coup d'état, while an international human rights mission judged this claim to be a useful line of research.

== Career and points of view ==
Gabriel Fino Noriega reported on daily news at a local radio station, Radio Estelar, and was a local correspondent for the national radio, Radio America. expressed opinions in favor of the 4th ballot box Constitutional assembly and against the removal of Manuel Zelaya Rosales on June 28, 2009. Sectors of society were divided over the actions on June 28 and he sympathized with the Resistance that called the removal a coup and other factors of society including the governmental branches said that it was a constitutional destitution from the presidency.

== Death ==
Gabriel Fino Noriega was killed by 7 bullets on 3 July when he left his workplace. The local human rights organisation COFADEH attributes the assassination to the coup d'état. An international human rights mission considered Noriega's political points of view to offer a line of research for understanding the death, but insufficient proof that the reason for the killing was political. Radio America, his employer and police both discarded politics as a motive for his death and related his murder to personal enemies. Another motive considered by local theorists for his assassination was journalism, according to local Police Spokesman César Wilfredo Ardón.
