= Honduran Council of Private Enterprise =

The Honduran Council of Private Enterprise (Spanish: Consejo Hondureño de la Empresa Privada, COHEP) is the largest business trade organization in Honduras. COHEP is one of the three private organizations in Honduras that proposes candidates for the Supreme Court of Honduras, and also sits on the board of directors of the Empresa Nacional de Energía Eléctrica (ENEE), Honduras's government owned and operated electrical power company. Its notable presidents included Mario Canahuati and Juan Carlos Sikaffy
