= Armida Villela de López Contreras =

Honduran politician, former presidential designate

2nd Vice President of Honduras
- In office 27 January 2002 – 27 January 2006
- President: Ricardo Maduro
- Preceded by: Gladys Caballero de Arévalo
- Succeeded by: Elvin Santos

Personal details
- Born: Armida María Villela Meza; 20 April 1948 (age 78) San Pedro Sula
- Party: Liberal Party of Honduras

Armida Villela de López Contreras is a Honduran politician and former presidential designate aka Vice President of Honduras.

She was born in San Pedro Sula on 20 April 1948. She completed her primary and secondary education in her hometown and at St Godric's College in London and her law studies at the National Autonomous University of Honduras and the Complutense University of Madrid. She worked as a lawyer.

She became the second presidential designate She was the third vice president of Honduras from January 2002 to January 2006, during the term of Ricardo Maduro. She is from the Liberal Party of Honduras. During the events that led to the coup d'état of 2009, she was known as an ardent critic of the administration of Manuel Zelaya.

She is married to Carlos López Contreras.
