= Supreme Court of Honduras =

Highest judicial authority in Honduras

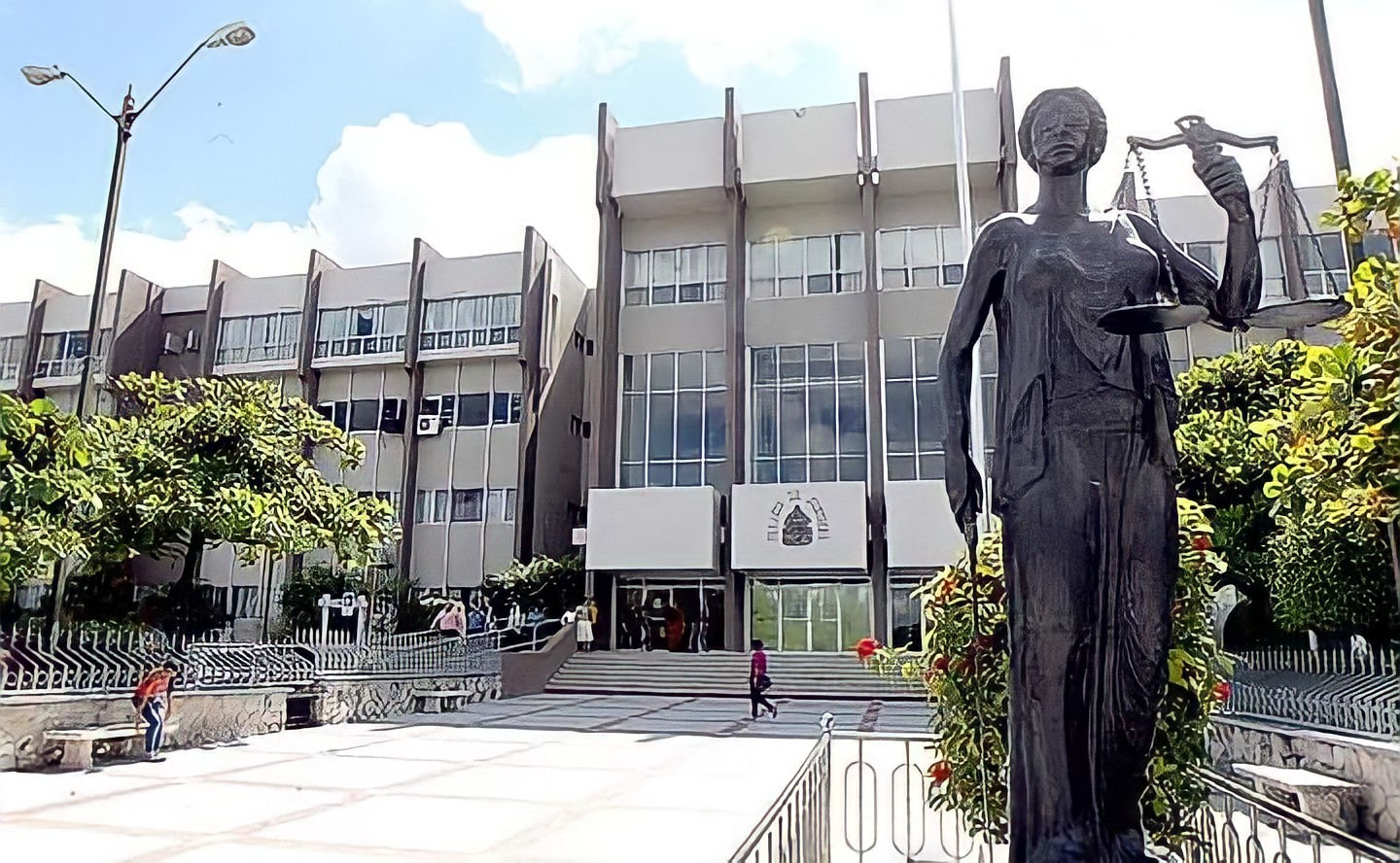
Building of the Supreme Court in Tegucigalpa.

The Supreme Court of Honduras (Spanish: Corte Suprema de Justicia de Honduras; CSJ) is the Supreme Court and Constitutional Court of Honduras. The Supreme Court is the highest judicial authority in Honduras.

== Structure, power, and duties ==
There are four chambers — civil, criminal, constitutional, and labor — with a certain number of justices assigned to each chamber as established in the 316th article of the Constitution. It has fourteen constitutional powers and duties, including:

1. Organize and direct the Judiciary;
2. Knowledge of legal proceedings involving senior officials of State, when the National Congress has declared to lead to formation of the facts;
3. Identifying the second instance of matters Courts Appeals have met in the first instance;
4. To hear extradition cases and the other to be judged according to international law;
5. To hear appeals under, review and unconstitutional under this constitution and the Law;
6. Authorize the exercise of notary who have obtained the law degree;
7. Meet the preliminary hearing at first instance against the Judges of the Appellate Courts;
8. To appoint and dismiss judges and judges on a proposal Council of the Judiciary;
9. Publish the Judicial Laws (Gaceta Judicial);
10. Prepare the draft budget of the judiciary and send to Congress;
11. To set the division of territory for jurisdictional purposes;
12. Create, delete, merge or transfer the Courts, Courts Appeals and other units of the Judiciary;
13. To issue its own internal regulations and other necessary things to fulfill their duties and;
14. The other powers conferred by the Constitution and Laws.

== Members ==
The court has 15 Judges:

- Rebeca Ráquel Obando (President)
- Sonia Marlina Dubón
- Roy Pineda
- Mario Díaz
- Francisca Villela
- Rubenia Galeano
- Gaudy Bustillo
- Anny Belinda Ochoa
- Isbela Bustillo
- Walter Miranda
- Luis Fernando Padilla
- Odalys Nájera
- Milton Jiménez
- Wagner Vallecillo
- Nelson Danilo Mairena

=== Election Process ===
The process of selecting new members of the Supreme Court of Honduras is sui generis, involving the participation of various sectors of civil society. Judges are elected by the National Congress from a list of candidates proposed by a 7-member Nominating Board consisting of:

1. A representative of the Supreme Court elected by the votes of two thirds of the judges;
2. A representative of the Honduran Bar Association, elected in Assembly;
3. The Honduran Commissioner for Human Rights;
4. A representative of the Honduran Council of Private Enterprise (COHEP), elected in Assembly;
5. A representative of the faculty of the School of Law, whose proposal will be made through the National Autonomous University of Honduras (UNAH);
6. A representative elected by civil society organizations; and
7. A representative of the trade unions.

Each entity submits a list of twenty candidates to a “Nominating Panel, of 7 members, each representing one nominating entity, which scrutinizes the qualifications of each submitted nominee on the 7 nomination lists (140 total), and any “self-nominated” candidates. The Nominating Panel selects 45 of these candidates to be included in a nomination list submitted to Congress. The National Congress selects the new 15 Supreme Court members from this list.

== History ==
=== 2008-2009 Supreme Court election crisis ===
Following months of political wrangling that dominated news in Honduras, the National Congress selected 15 new judges to ascend to the Supreme Court of Justice shortly before midnight on January 25, 2009, as the previous court’s term was set to expire that same day. The final issue was an attempt by the executive branch to re-elect a sitting member of the court who wasn’t on the slate of 45 candidates, Sonia Marlina Dubón de Flores.

The standoff included alleged threats from Defense Minister Arístides Mejía to surround the congressional building with tanks should members fail to comply with the request to reseat Dubón. An angry retort from President of the National Congress Roberto Micheletti, who said that the legislature abided by democracy and rule of law, not military threats or pressure. Mejía later denied making such threats.

President Manuel Zelaya appeared before Congress shortly after the standoff to quell rumors started by National Party opponents that he was attempting a coup over the issue. Finally, the two majority parties in Congress decided to split the court between eight Liberal Party and seven National Party candidates — a switch from the previous court, in which the National Party held a one-member majority.

The Democratic Unification (or Unified Democracy) and Innovation and Unity parties abstained from the final vote in protest of the system used to select the court. Instead of voting on a block of candidates pre-selected by the two majority parties, they would have preferred to vote on each candidate individually. Unified Democracy Congresswoman Doris Gutiérrez lamented the low numbers of women, saying, “We now have a scant 20 percent of women on the court, where we’ve always had seven or eight [of 15].” Human Rights Commissioner Ramon Custodio and several evangelical leaders said the new court would be less partisan and politicized than it had been in the past, despite Congress' final selection method. U.S. Ambassador Hugo Llorens called the selection "a great step forward for democracy, the judiciary and transparency in Honduras."

The fifteen members of the Supreme Court are appointed by agreement between the two main political parties for a seven year term. An organization claims that the highest judicial offices still being distributed between the two main parties. By requiring them to be re-elected by the National Congress it makes them subject to policies of their sponsoring party. Eight of the judges were selected by the Liberal Party and seven by the National Party.

An international mission in 2008, organized by the International Commission of Jurists and the Due Process of Law Foundation, admired the inclusive nature of the selection process, but received information from multiple sources about alleged irregularities in the elaboration of certain lists, and information concerning alleged political influence, which might serve to undermine the selection process. The Mission verified widespread distrust in the selection process, more specifically, a belief that the candidate lists are a result of political and powerful interest groups interferences. The Mission recognized the interest expressed by, and opening up of, many key actors and groups within the Honduran society towards the selection process and invited the international community to become more involved and to promote a transparent process that leads to the selection of justices with the stature required by a Supreme Court.

=== 2009 Honduran constitutional crisis ===
On 27 May 2009, the Administrative Law Tribunal issued an injunction against holding the poll at the request of the Honduran Attorney General Luis Alberto Rubi. On 16 June the Court of Appeals unanimously upheld the 27 May injunction. On 18 June, the Administrative Law Tribunal ordered Zelaya to comply with the ruling in writing within five days. On 26 June, the Supreme Court unanimously found that the Presidency had not complied with the 18 June court order and issued a sealed order to detain President Manuel Zelaya for the purposes of taking a statement. This precipitated some of the most dramatic events of the 2009 Honduran constitutional crisis.

The court was criticized by several UN experts for the dismissal of several judges in relation to the crisis. They noted the dismissals appeared related only to the public expression of opposition to events during the crisis and that the accused judges were not given the opportunity to participate in the proceedings.

== See also ==
- Politics of Honduras
- Government of Honduras
- National Congress of Honduras
- Executive branch of the government of Honduras
