= 2009 Honduran constitutional crisis =

Political crisis in Honduras

The 2009 Honduran constitutional crisis was a political crisis in Honduras over plans by President Manuel Zelaya to hold a popular referendum to either rewrite the Constitution of Honduras or write a new one.

Zelaya's planned vote to change the constitution faced opposition from a majority of the government, including the Supreme Court of Honduras and prominent members of Zelaya's Liberal Party, as it could lead to the re-election of Presidents which is permanently outlawed by the Honduran constitution. The Supreme Court upheld a lower court injunction against the referendum. A crisis occurred as the Constitution of Honduras had no process for dealing with this situation, and there were no clear procedures for removing or prosecuting a sitting President.

On the morning of 28 June 2009, Zelaya was removed in a coup d’état by the Honduran Armed Forces, when approximately 100 soldiers stormed the President's residence in Tegucigalpa and exiled him to Costa Rica. The National Congress voted to remove Zelaya as President, having read without objection a purported letter of resignation, which Zelaya stated was forged. Roberto Micheletti, the President of Congress and next in the presidential line of succession, was sworn in as interim president. Micheletti declared a "state of exception" on 1 July, suspending civil liberties and various curfews were imposed.

== State of emergency ==
On 21 September 2009, Zelaya returned in secret to Honduras, after several attempts to return had been rebuffed. It was announced that he was in the Brazilian embassy in Tegucigalpa. The next day, the Micheletti government declared a state of emergency and suspended five constitutional rights for 45 days, specifically:

- personal liberty (Article 69),
- freedom of expression (Article 72),
- freedom of movement (Article 81),
- habeas corpus (Article 84)
- freedom of association and assembly.

The decree suspending human rights was officially revoked on 19 October 2009 in La Gaceta.

== Reaction ==
These events garnered widespread condemnation as a coup d’état. The United Nations, the Organization of American States (OAS), and the European Union condemned the removal of Zelaya as a military coup, and some of these condemnations may still remain unretracted. The OAS rejected an attempt by Honduras to withdraw from the organisation and then suspended the membership of Honduras the following day. Domestic opinion remained very much divided, with demonstrations both for and against Zelaya.

Efforts by Costa Rican President Óscar Arias and the United States to effect a diplomatic solution between Micheletti and Zelaya initially resulted in a proposal by President Arias calling for Zelaya's return to the presidency, albeit with curtailed powers. Arias's proposal also stipulated political amnesty and moved the Honduran general elections up by a month, pushing them to take place in October. The US supported the San José Accord, but negotiations ultimately broke down. The two parties were unwilling to come to any lasting agreement.

== Election ==
Zelaya (elected in January 2006) insisted that the elections of 29 November should not be a precondition to his return to power.

Honduran leaders refused to reinstate Zelaya, pending the elections, but international support for the elections remained scant leading up to the polls. Many Hondurans sought to move past the crisis with the elections, which had been scheduled previous to Zelaya's ouster. Zelaya urged a boycott of the vote.

Initial returns indicated a larger than usual turnout, around 60%, a figure subsequently revised downward to 49%. Zelaya also disputed those figures at the time. Some Honduran activists ended their daily protests demanding the reinstatement of Zelaya because he was ousted in a coup, since Congress voted to keep Manuel Zelaya out of office.

The crisis drew to a close with the inauguration of the newly elected president, Porfirio Lobo, on 27 January 2010. A deal allowed Zelaya to leave the Brazilian embassy and go into exile in the Dominican Republic.

== Background ==
=== Political and socioeconomic divide in Honduras ===
Two-thirds of Honduras citizens live below the poverty line, and unemployment is estimated at 28%. It has one of Latin America's most unequal distribution of wealth: the poorest 10% of the population receives just 1.2% of the country's wealth, while the richest 10% collect 42%. Approximately twenty per cent of the nation's GDP comes from remittances of workers from abroad. The BBC called the huge wealth gap in a poor country as one of the reasons why the relations between the president and the other institutions were so strained and that his leftward movement alarmed certain sectors.

Zelaya pushed for a referendum, insisting that Honduras' grinding poverty stemmed from a constitution written in 1982 at the height of that country's brutal repression of leftists – that rigs the game for the most powerful families and interests.

Zelaya supporters, largely from labour unions and the poor, claim conservative business leaders are actually concerned because Zelaya had sharply increased the minimum wage. Víctor Meza, formerly Zelaya's interior minister, stated that: "The impression that stuck with the traditional political class and with the most conservative business leaders of the country was that Zelaya had taken a dangerous turn to the left, and therefore that their interests were in jeopardy." "We underestimated the conservatism of the Honduran political class and the military leadership." John Donaghy of Caritas has said that the real conflict in Honduras is between the poor and wealthy: "It's a system that has kept the poor down for years." To some members of Honduras's small upper class, Zelaya was ousted because of his blossoming leftist alliance with President Hugo Chávez of Venezuela which they recognised as a threat to their interests. To the working-class, it appeared Zelaya was ousted because the elite felt threatened by his efforts to improve their lives – most notably with a 60% increase in the minimum wage to about US$9.60 a day from about $6 a day. Some who protested in support of Zelaya had never voted for him.

=== Zelaya presidency ===
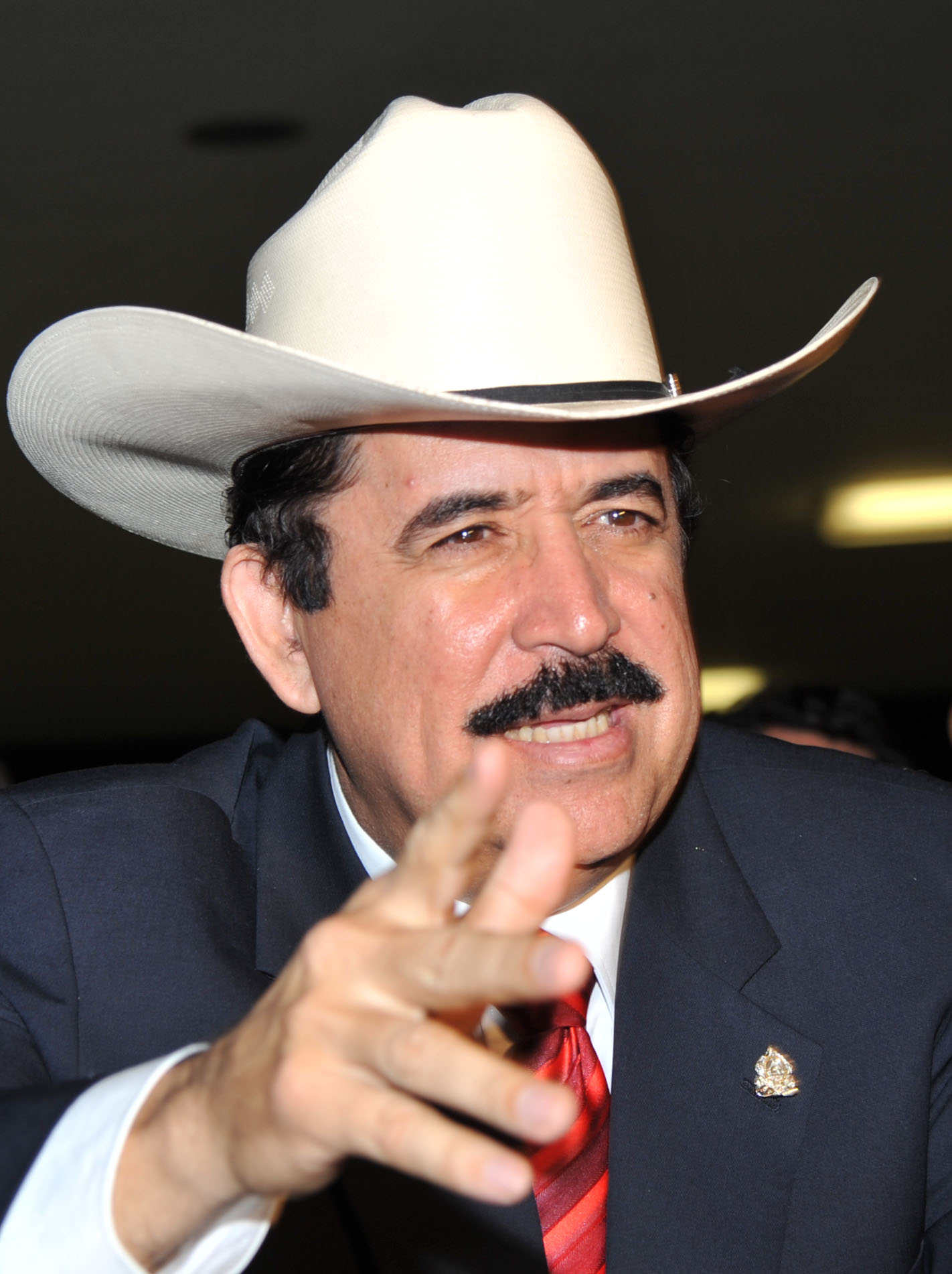
Manuel Zelaya

Manuel Zelaya, a businessman born into a wealthy Honduran family, was elected in 2005 as the candidate of the country's historically powerful Liberal Party. Zelaya's economic and social policies earned him praise from labour unions and civil society groups, but alienated him from parts of his own party. which were particularly upset by Zelaya's forging a regional alliance with the Bolivarian Alternative for the Americas (ALBA), established by Venezuelan President Hugo Chávez and other leaders in Latin America as a counter to the trade and security policies sponsored by the United States. Zelaya also planned to convert the Soto Cano Air Base ("Palmerola"), where one of the three United States Southern Command Task Forces is located, into a civilian airport (it was already in use for many civilian flights because of safety concerns about Toncontín International Airport), partly using financing from ALBA and Petrocaribe. The New York Times reported that much of Zelaya's support was derived from labour unions and the nation's poor, while the middle and upper class feared Zelaya was seeking to establish Hugo Chávez's type of socialist populism with a powerful leader in the country.

Zelaya's government was accused of harassing journalists and also accused by the Organization of American States (OAS) of imposing "subtle censorship" in Honduras.

According to The Economist, "Mr. Zelaya's presidency has been marked by a rise in crime, corruption scandals and economic populism." By April 2009, a Mitofsky opinion poll showed that, of those consulted, only one in four respondents approved of Zelaya – the lowest approval rating of 18 regional leaders.

=== Alliance with ALBA ===
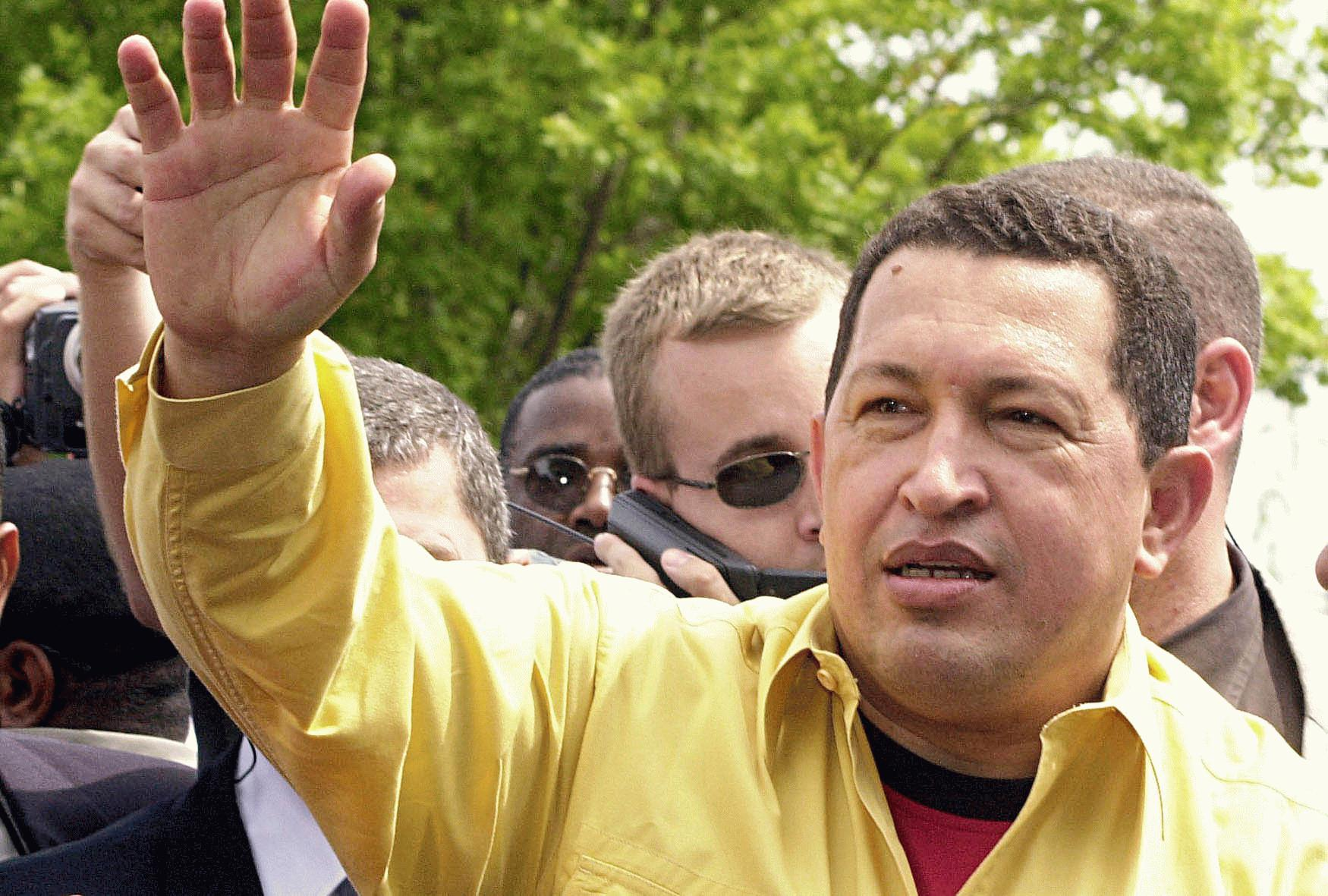
Hugo Chávez

On 22 July 2008, Zelaya announced plans to incorporate the country into the Bolivarian Alliance for the People of Our America (ALBA), an organisation founded by Hugo Chávez, and that the country had been an "observer member" for "four or more months". The Associated Press, citing Manuel Orozco of the Inter-American Dialogue, said his "campaign for changing the constitution has energized his support base of labour groups, farmers and civil organisations who have long felt marginalized in a country where a wealthy elite controls the media and much of politics".

The Honduran right opposed the ALBA alliance, and feared that Zelaya would move to eliminate the presidential term limit as other ALBA leaders had, whom they considered would-be dictators. According to National Party analyst Raúl Pineda Alvarado, Zelaya's attempt to modify the constitution was a "carbon copy" of what had happened in Venezuela, Ecuador and Nicaragua. US Republican Newt Gingrich wrote in the Washington Examiner that Chávez had used ALBA to create "a tide of incipient dictatorship" flowing out of Venezuela into other countries in Latin America. He noted that Chávez had subverted democracy in Venezuela to ensure his rule would be uncontested for decades, and "one-by-one, each of the members of ALBA have followed Chavez's lead and changed their constitutions to remove limits on the number of terms their presidents can serve." However, the notion of extending term limits in Latin America is not unique to ALBA countries, as efforts in Colombia have been made towards allowing President Álvaro Uribe seek re-election.

== Constitutional assembly plans ==
As early as August 2006, Central America Report stated that "liberal sectors" were proposing to reform "obsolete articles" in the constitution, including one against presidential re-election. The Report said that this was causing controversy. Debate regarding the convening of a constituent assembly took place in Honduras, with support from many groups. "The constitution has since 1980 been tweaked in other areas around thirty times, to the point where politicians of all camps are convinced that the document is no longer adequate. This is where the formal change proposed by Manuel Zelaya comes in: that in the November 2009 election-round, the voters will be presented with four ballot-boxes – the fourth one being used for a referendum on the question: "Do you agree with convening a constituent assembly to draw up a new constitution?"

On 11 November 2008, President Zelaya announced a non-binding referendum to see if the people wanted to have a fourth ballot box (or "Cuarta Urna") during the November 2009 election. The fourth ballot would ask voters whether they wanted to hold a National Constituent Assembly to draft a new constitution. Zelaya, whose presidential term was to expire on 27 January 2010, would be ineligible, under the term-limitations of the present constitution, to run in the 2009 election.

On 22 December 2008 Zelaya issued two emergency executive agreements ("acuerdos"), both numbered 46-A-2008, which each authorised transfer of L 30,000,000 of public money to advertising of the fourth ballot box. Only one was published in the official Gazette. The supposed advertisers paid no sales tax. The Supreme Audit Court's investigation of the advertising money raised concerns of irregularities.

On 17 February 2009, at a public showcasing of tractor equipment received from Venezuela, Manuel Zelaya stated that he would propose a fourth ballot box. On 24 March 2009, Zelaya called for a preliminary poll to be held on 28 June 2009 to gauge popular support for including the Constituent Assembly question in the November 2009 election.

=== Constitutionality of referendum ===
The President of the Congress, Micheletti, observed that Article 374 of the constitution states that no referendum can be used to alter the entrenched articles in the constitution that are specified in article 384. He went on to insist that even to announce such a referendum privately is a crime (" . . . porque eso, incluso, anunciarlo privadamente es un delito.")

Article 373 of the Constitution of Honduras states that the constitution can be modified by a two-thirds majority of the National Congress. However, Article 374 specifies that several articles are permanently entrenched; that is, they cannot be modified under any circumstances (Spanish: "en ningún caso"). The entrenched clauses include those on the system of government that is permitted, and the presidential succession. Article 239 specifically prohibits the president from attempting to amend restrictions on succession, and states that whoever does so will cease "immediately" in his or her functions. Zelaya's statement – "[t]he only one who can't be re-elected is the President, but re-election is a topic of the next National Constitutional Assembly" – is a declaration that some have argued violates Article 239. Article 239, however, is not mentioned at all in the judicial case file.

=== Court ruling ===
On 25 March, the Attorney General's office formally notified President Zelaya that he would face criminal charges of abusing power if he proceeded with the referendum.

In late May, the court of contentious administration ruled the poll illegal. Honduras' Supreme Electoral Tribunal also ruled that such a poll would be illegal. The lower court's injunction, against the poll, was upheld by the Supreme Court. In late June, the intended consultative poll was also rejected by Congress.

On 3 June, Congress passed a resolution warning Zelaya to correct his administrative conduct.

On 11 June, the Bar Association of Honduras unanimously agreed that Zelaya was violating the law. It asked Zelaya to stop the illegalities and recommended officials not follow his illegal orders.

On 23 June 2009, Congress passed a law forbidding holding official polls or referendums less than 180 days before the next general election, which would have made 28 June poll illegal. Since this bill was passed after the poll was scheduled, Zelaya rejected its applicability to this case.

The military is in charge of security and logistics in elections in Honduras. Zelaya asked them to perform their election role for the poll, but the head of the military command, General Romeo Vásquez Velásquez, refused the order to pass out the poll materials because the Supreme Court had ruled the poll to be illegal. On 24 June, Zelaya fired him. Later that day, the defence minister and heads of the army, navy and air force resigned. On 25 June, the Supreme Court ruled 5–0 that General Velásquez be reinstated. Tribunal member David Matamoros affirmed the Electoral Tribunal's support for the military's actions.

On 24 June, surveillance cameras captured how about US$2,000,000 in cash was withdrawn from the Central Bank of Honduras and allegedly driven to the office of Enrique Flores Lanza, Zelaya's chief of staff. The suspicious money was possibly used to finance the referendum.

Just days before the referendum, Zelaya published executive decree PCM-019-2009, which revoked the earlier decree PCM-05-2009. Zelaya issued a new executive decree PCM-020-2009, another attempt to legalise the referendum. According to a legal analysis by former Supreme Court President Vilma Morales, Zelaya stopped being President of Honduras.

=== Seizure of ballots ===
Ballots arrived from Venezuela on a plane and the ballot boxes were kept at the Tegucigalpa airport. The Supreme Electoral Tribunal ordered the illegal ballots to be confiscated. Investigators from the Ministerio Público and the Honduran attorney general's office arrived at the airport.

Zelaya led several hundred people to an air force base and took possession of the disputed poll ballots, which were then kept in the presidential palace to avoid their destruction.

In late June, there were large marches both for and against the proposed fourth ballot box.

The Supreme Court, Congress, and the military and the National Human Rights Commissioner recommended that voters stay home because the poll would be neither fair nor safe for voters.

== Coup d’état ==
=== Supreme court detention order ===
On 27 May 2009, the Administrative Law Tribunal issued an injunction against holding the poll at the request of Honduran Attorney General Luis Alberto Rubi. On 16 June the Court of Appeals unanimously upheld the 27 May injunction. On 18 June, the Administrative Law Tribunal ordered Zelaya to comply with the ruling in writing within five days. On 26 June the Supreme Court unanimously found that the president had not complied with 18 June order. It also found he was answerable to charges, brought by the Attorney General, for the crimes against the form of government, treason to the motherland, abuse of office and usurpation of functions that damaged the administration. To initiate the case, the Supreme Court appointed member Tomás Arita Valle, who, on 26 June, issued a sealed (secret) order to detain Zelaya for the purposes of taking a statement. Some pro-Zelaya supporters have sought to cast doubt on the Supreme Court's documentation.

=== Zelaya's detention and first exile ===
Soldiers stormed the president's residence in Tegucigalpa early in the morning of 28 June, disarming the presidential guard, waking Zelaya and putting him on a plane to Costa Rica. In San José, Costa Rica, Zelaya told TeleSUR that he had been awakened by gunshots. Masked soldiers took his cell phone, shoved him into a van and took him to an air force base, where he was put on a plane. He said he did not know that he was being taken to Costa Rica until he landed at the airport in San José. To the media, he described the events as "a coup" and "a kidnapping".

Tanks patrolled the streets and military planes flew overhead. Soldiers guarded the main government buildings. The government television station and a television station that supported the president were taken off the air. Television and radio stations broadcast no news. The electrical power, phone lines, and international cable TV were cut or blocked throughout Honduras. Public transportation was suspended.

Later that day, the Supreme Court issued a statement that it had ordered the army to arrest Zelaya. On 30 June, the military's chief lawyer, Colonel Herberth Inestroza, showed Judge Arita's arrest order. Colonel Inestroza later stated that deporting Zelaya did not comply with the court order, but that military leadership had decided to do so to avoid violence in Honduras, asking "What was more beneficial, remove this gentleman from Honduras or present him to prosecutors and have a mob assault and burn and destroy and for us to have to shoot?". Inestroza also stated that Zelaya's allegiance to Chávez was hard to stomach and "It would be difficult for us, with our training, to have a relationship with a leftist government. That's impossible. I personally would have retired, because my thinking, my principles, would not have allowed me to participate in that."

Ramón Custodio, the head of the country's human rights commission, said that Zelaya's exile was a mistake and that the military made an "error" sending Zelaya into exile rather than holding him for trial. Honduras's Supreme Court has agreed to hear a case brought by a group of lawyers and judges arguing that the military broke the law taking Zelaya out of the country. In August 2009, Micheletti himself said that a mistake was made when Zelaya was exiled.

=== Alleged impeachment and presidential succession ===
A document purporting to be a resignation letter written by President Zelaya, dated 25 June, was read to congress. Zelaya has said he did not write the letter. Later that day, in an extraordinary session Congress voted to remove Zelaya for manifest irregular conduct and putting in present danger the state of law.

The President of the National Congress was the next on the presidential line of succession because Vice-President Elvin Santos had earlier quit to run in the 2009 elections. The President of the National Congress was Roberto Micheletti, a member of Zelaya's party. By a show of hands, the National Congress – the majority of whom belonged to Zelaya's own Liberal party – named Micheletti to complete the remaining months of the presidential term.

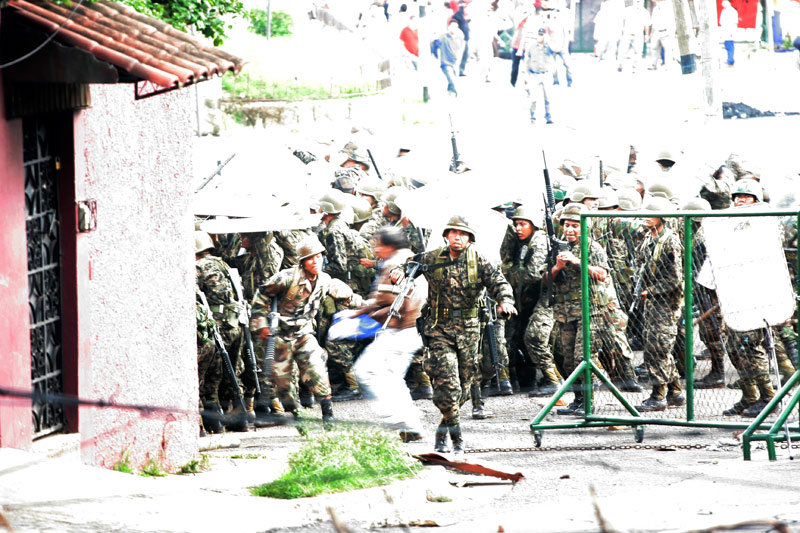
A clash between pro-Zelaya protesters and the Honduran military

At around 12:37 the Honduran National Congress unanimously agreed to:

- Under the Articles 1, 2, 3, 4, 205, 220, subsections 20, 218, 242, 321, 322, 323 of the Constitution of the Republic,
  - Disapprove Zelaya's repeated violations of the constitution, laws and court orders.
  - Remove Zelaya from office.
- Name the current President of Congress to complete the presidential term that ends on 27 January 2010.

Honduran institutions, including the National Congress, the Supreme Court, and the interim government, maintain Zelaya was replaced constitutionally. Arguments that Zelaya's ouster was illegal because the proper legal procedures were not used has been advanced by several lawyers. Acting Honduran President Roberto Micheletti said forcing deposed President Manuel Zelaya to leave the country, instead of arresting him, was a mistake.

=== Emergency measures by the interim government ===
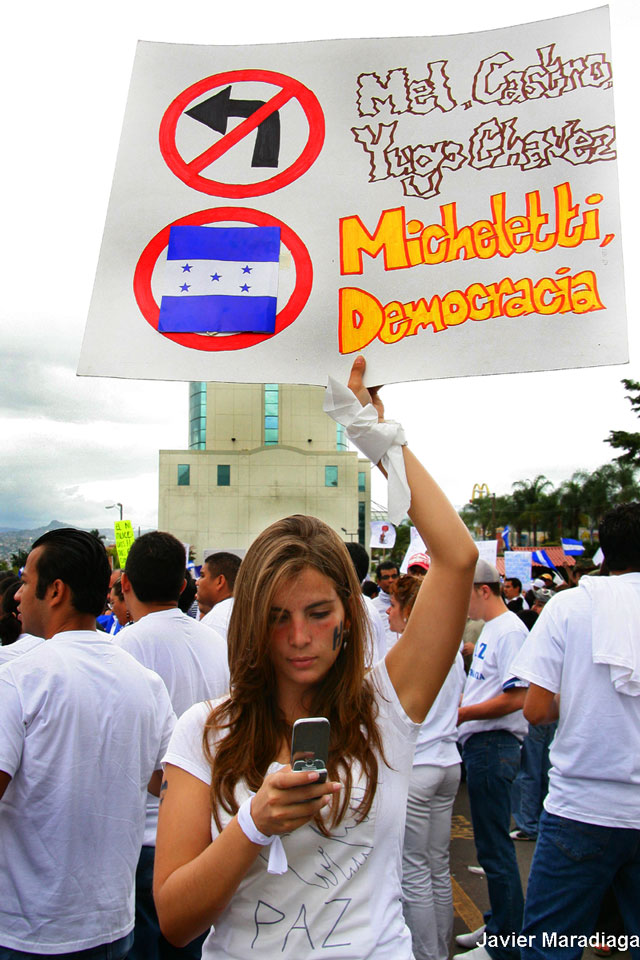
Demonstrators supporting Micheletti

Acting President Roberto Micheletti ordered a curfew which initially lasted for the 48 hours from Sunday night (28 June) and to Tuesday (30 June). The curfew law was not published in the official journal La Gaceta and was not approved by Congress. Originally the curfew ran from 9:00 p.m. to 6:00 a.m. That curfew was extended, changed, or renewed several times, in ways Amnesty International and the International Observation Mission called "arbitrary". On 1 July, Congress issued an order (decreto ejecutivo N° 011-2009) which extended restrictions between 22:00 and 05:00 local time and also suspended four constitutional guarantees, including freedom of transit, due process, and freedom from unwarranted search and seizure.

The ambassadors of Cuba, Venezuela, and Nicaragua stated that on 29 June that they were detained and beaten by Honduran troops before being released. Also, several allies of Zelaya were taken into custody by the military. Among them were: Foreign Minister Patricia Rodas; the mayor of the city San Pedro Sula, Rodolfo Padilla Sunseri; several congressmen of the Democratic Unification Party (PUD); and several other government officials. A dozen former ministers from the Zelaya government, as well as PUD presidential candidate Cesar Ham, went into hiding. A Venezuelan state-owned media outlet claimed that Tomás Andino Mencías, a member of the party, said that PUD lawmakers were led away by the military when they tried to enter the parliament building for 28 June vote on Zelaya's deposal.

Several TV stations, radio stations, and newspaper's websites were temporarily shut down. The Miami Herald reported that the "crackdown on the media" began before dawn on the 28th. It said that only pro-Micheletti stations were allowed to broadcast and that they carried only news friendly to the new government. Associated Press personnel were detained and removed from their hotel, but later released. A number of local reporters and media sources reported on harassment and restrictions. Alejandro Villatoro, director of Radio Globo, said that he was arrested and "kidnapped" for some hours by the military.

Honduran newspaper La Prensa reported on 30 June that an armed group of Zelaya supporters, attacked its main headquarters by throwing stones and other objects at their windows, until police intervened.

== Events after 28 June ==
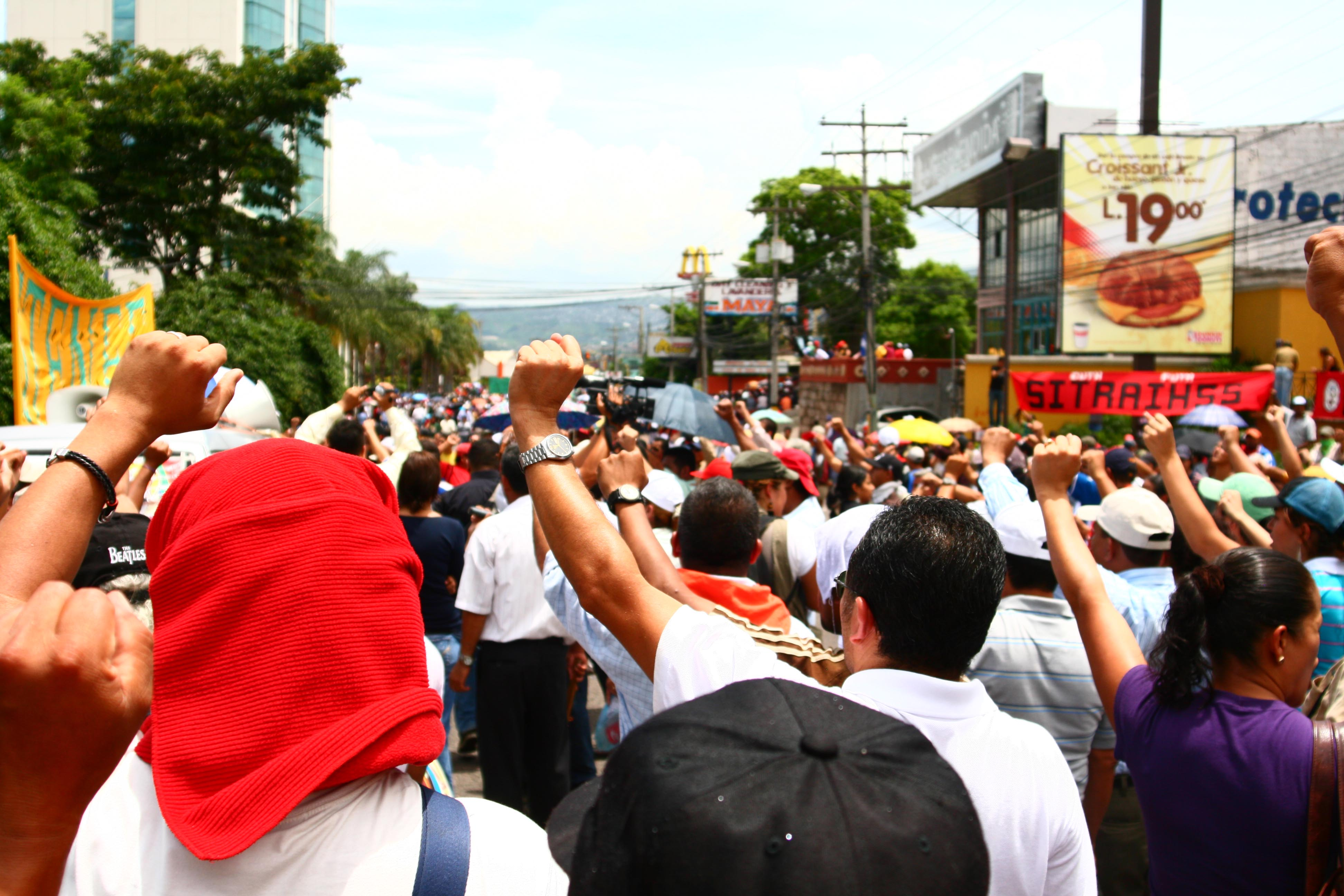
Pro-Zelaya protesters marching in Tegucigalpa

Protests against the coup began almost immediately, as several thousand Zelaya supporters gathered near the Presidential Palace, confronting the guarding soldiers and lit tires on fire. In response to daily pro-Zelaya protests, Congress approved a decree on 1 July that applied an overnight curfew and allowed security forces to arrest people at home and hold them for more than 24 hours.

On 30 June, the United Nations General Assembly unanimously adopted a resolution which called for the reinstatement of Zelaya as the President of Honduras. Zelaya spoke in front of the General Assembly where he was applauded several times. In his speech, Zelaya promised not to seek another term as President and said that he would not accept a second term if he were asked to serve again.

30 June also saw the first rally in support of Zelaya's removal take place in the capital, as thousands of Zelaya opponents took to the main square. Roberto Micheletti made an appearance and said that the November general elections will be held as scheduled and that a new president will be sworn in on 27 January 2010. General Romeo Vásquez Velásquez also attended and spoke at the rally.

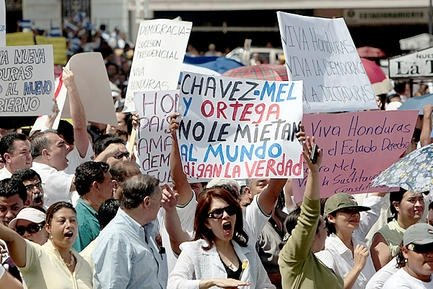
Anti-Zelaya demonstrators in Tegucigalpa

Honduras was formally suspended from the Organization of American States on 4 July, after the Micheletti government ignored an ultimatum by the OAS to re-instate Zelaya as president. OAS Secretary General José Miguel Insulza had arrived in Honduras the previous day to negotiate Zelaya's return.

Zelaya met with US Secretary of State Hillary Clinton in Washington on 7 July. At this meeting, Zelaya agreed to a US-backed proposal for negotiation talks with Micheletti government representatives in Costa Rica set for 9 July. The talks, with Costa Rican President Óscar Arias serving as mediator, proved unsuccessful, as both sides remained far apart according to regional leaders. The participants only agreed to meet again sometime in the future, as Zelaya left Costa Rica to gather more international support.

Meanwhile, Micheletti announced that he accepted the resignation of his Foreign Minister Enrique Ortez, who, in a TV interview, had called US President Barack Obama "[un] negrito que no sabe nada de nada" ("a little black man who knows nothing about nothing"). The US Embassy in Honduras strongly condemned the comments, which Micheletti described as "a scandalous epithet". However, Micheletti immediately reinstated Ortez as Minister of Government and Justice.

In mid-July Honduran Roman Catholic Cardinal Óscar Andrés Rodríguez Maradiaga said that he supported Zelaya's removal from office, saying that Zelaya now "doesn't have any authority, moral or legal", while opposing his expulsion from the country. On 15 July 2009, interim president Roberto Micheletti stated he would be prepared to step down "if at some point that decision is needed to bring peace and tranquility to the country, but without the return, and I stress this, of former President Zelaya".

In a 16 July interview President Óscar Arias said that he had a mandate from 34 world governments to restore constitutional order in Honduras, by which he meant restore President Zelaya. He rejected Micheletti's proposal to step down if Zelaya did not return to power. He said, "we will see if we can talk of an amnesty, and for whom, over political crimes (veremos si se puede hablar de una amnistía, y para quiénes, sobre delitos políticos)". "Zelaya must abandon his goal of installing a fourth ballot box", he continued. Arias indicated he intended to propose a reconciliation government headed by Zelaya combined with political amnesty.

Meanwhile, both pro- and anti-Zelaya demonstrations continued on an almost daily basis throughout the deeply polarised country.

=== Venezuela, Nicaragua and Cuba ===
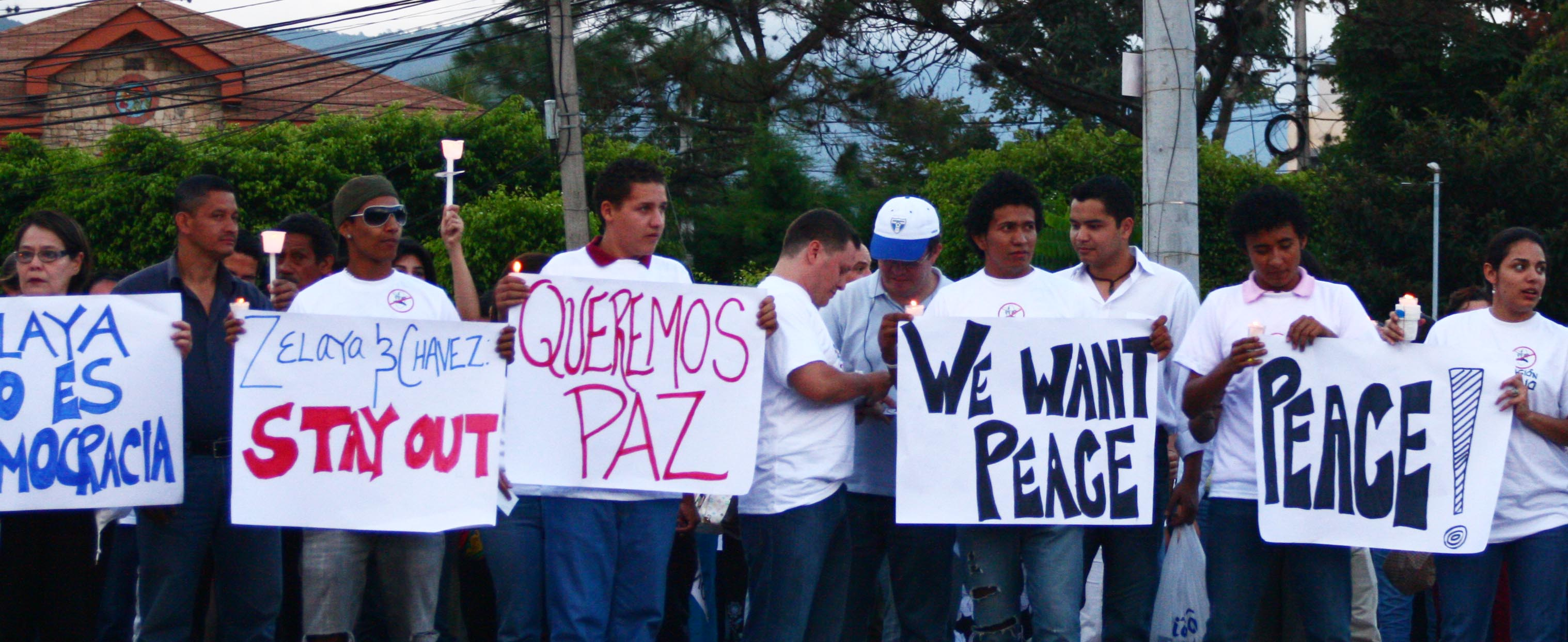
Hondurans promoting peace and opposing Zelaya and Chávez

After Zelaya's exile, Chavez alleged that the Venezuelan ambassador was assaulted by Honduran soldiers; Chavez said that if the ambassador were killed or the Venezuelan Embassy were violated, this would constitute an act of war requiring a military response. On 2 July, Honduran police arrested several Cubans and Nicaraguans present at demonstrations, and police sources claimed Venezuelans were active in the anti-coup movement. On 5 July, Venezuelan media showed Hugo Chávez watching Zelaya's attempt to land. Accidentally visible in Chávez's office was the text "051345JUL09 Swarm of africanized bees, Presidential Podium, wounded by stings and desperation of the people", the military-style code for 5, 13 July:45 coincided with a violent confrontation in Honduras. On 8 July, Colombia arrested 80 Venezuelans who attempted to travel to Honduras. On 27 July, police confiscated a booklet in a car owned by Carlos Eduardo Reina, a leader of pro-Zelaya operations. It allegedly contained a list of 15 receipts, dated 24 July, and references to a meeting near Nicaraguan border. The receipts totalled 160,000 US dollars. Hugo Chávez allegedly made payments to ambassadors of Honduras.

In October 2009, Daniel Ortega hinted that the "Resistance" is searching for weapons and training centres. Hugo Chávez said "I'm just warning... no one to be surprised if there is an armed movement in the mountains of Honduras".

=== Opposition to the interim government ===
Much of the opposition to the de facto Micheletti government and its actions were coordinated through a wide coalition of grassroots organisations and political parties and movements formerly known as Frente Nacional contra el Golpe de Estado en Honduras (FNGE), now Frente Nacional de Resistencia Popular. The FNGE aimed to restore elected President Manuel Zelaya in replacement of the de facto Roberto Micheletti government, which is perceived by the participating organisations as a dictatorship, considering the documented human rights violations since the coup d’état and the reappearance of figures involved in disappearances and torture in former coups d’état. The FNGE supports a process of participatory democracy that should lead to a national constituent assembly.

FNGE held marches every day since 28 June, except the days when a curfew was imposed, where demonstrations took place in grassroot neighbourhoods. Notable marches on 5 July 15 September, and 27 January involved over 200,000 people per day.

=== Human rights complaints ===
A number of groups have published reports, including COFADEH, International Federation of Human Rights, "La Misión Internacional de Solidaridad, Observación y Acompañamiento a Honduras", "Quixote Center Emergency Delegation of Solidarity, Accompaniment and Witness", Amnesty International, the Inter-American Commission on Human Rights (IACHR), and Human Rights Watch that documented instances of sexual violence, excessive use of military force, arbitrary detentions, threats at gunpoint against judges responsible for habeas corpus detention and beating members of the media and several confirmed deaths and disappearances allegedly attributable to the de facto government.

19-year-old Isis Obed Murillo Mencías was shot in the head on 5 July when Zelaya's plane was trying to land at Toncontin Airport; Roger Iván Bados, former union leader, member of the Democratic Unification Party and Bloque Popular, shot dead on 11 July while entering his home in San Pedro Sula; 40-year-old campesino leader and Democratic Unification Party member Ramón García on 12 July, after he was forced by unknown people to get off a bus; 23-year-old Pedro Magdiel Muñoz Salvador, allegedly detained by police during anti-coup protests and taken to an El Paraíso police station on 24 July, was allegedly found at 6:30 am the following morning with 42 stab wounds; 38-year-old high school teacher Roger Abraham Vallejo Soriano, shot in the head allegedly by security forces during protests on 31 July, died on 1 August On 3 July, Radio América journalist Gabriel Fino Noriega was murdered near La Ceiba.

On or just before 4 August 2009, the National Telecommunications Commission (CONATEL) terminated Radio Globo's transmission frequency rights. The Paris-based press freedom group Reporters Without Borders released a statement on 29 June stating that, "The suspension or closure of local and international broadcast media indicates that the coup leaders want to hide what is happening." Carlos Lauría of the New York-based Committee to Protect Journalists said: "The de facto government clearly used the security forces to restrict the news... Hondurans did not know what was going on. They clearly acted to create an information vacuum to keep people unaware of what was actually happening." However, in an interview published on 9 July 2009 in The Washington Post, Ramón Custodio López, Honduras's human rights ombudsman, said he had received no official complaints from journalists: "This is the first I have heard about an occupation or military raid of a station," he said. "I try to do the best job I can, but there are things that escape my knowledge."

On 21 August 2009, the Inter-American Commission on Human Rights (IACHR) dispatched a six-member delegation which reported accusations it received. The delegation was told of alleged violent confrontations and arbitrary arrests. Someone even accused police of rape. Some alleged that judges were threatened "at gunpoint". According to the received allegations, 3,500 and 4,000 people had been arrested. The IACHR also received accusations that the government has threatened, detained and beaten members of the media. Based on the statements it received, the delegation concluded that there was "an atmosphere of intimidation that inhibits the free exercise of freedom of expression". On the same day, 93 academics and authors, mostly from United States universities, criticised Human Rights Watch's lack of statements and reports on Honduras between 8 July and 21 August. Four days later, Human Rights Watch published a summary of the IACHR report and stated that it had published reports up to 8 July and that human rights supporters had encouraged the IACHR to "directly [intervene]". ABC News (United States) claimed that HRW had "commissioned" the IACHR report.

Violent confrontations with media continued from both Zelaya supporters and opponents during the week of 12 August 2009.

On 10 October, Honduras' interim leaders put in place new rules that threaten broadcasters with closure for airing reports that "attack national security", further restricting media freedom following the closure of two opposition stations.

=== Zelaya's secret return to Honduras ===
Zelaya made two initial, open attempts to return to his country, which were rebuffed. On 5 July he attempted to return by air, and the Micheletti government responded by closing Toncontín International Airport and sending the military to guard the runways. As thousands of Zelaya supporters gathered at the airport to meet him, one was confirmed dead and scores injured, when "several soldiers walked through [the crowd] and began firing indiscriminately".

On 26 July, Zelaya briefly entered into Honduran territory, at a border crossing between Honduras and Nicaragua near Las Manos in El Paraíso Department.

On 21 September 2009, Zelaya and his wife arrived at the Brazilian embassy in Tegucigalpa. Zelaya stated that to reach the embassy he travelled through mountains for fifteen hours, and took back roads to avoid checkpoints, but he did not state from which country he entered Honduras. He stated to Canal 36 that "I am here in Tegucigalpa. I am here for the restoration of democracy, to call for dialogue".

Michelletti initially denied that Zelaya had returned. After admitting the return, he issued a curfew and asked the Brazilian government to put Zelaya in Honduran custody to be put on trial. Brazilian foreign minister Celso Amorim stated that Brazil did not aid Zelaya's return.

Thousands of Zelaya supporters soon congregated around the embassy. Security Vice-Minister Mario Perdomo ordered checkpoints to be placed on highways leading to Tegucigalpa, to "stop those people coming to start trouble". Defense Minister Lionel Sevilla suspended all air flights to Tegucigalpa. Late that day, Honduran security forces used tear gas and batons to disperse the crowds outside the Brazilian embassy. The interim government also surrounded the area with military and several agencies reported that 'hooded men' had stormed the building next to the embassy. About 50 pro-Zelaya supporters have been reported wounded by police.

Electricity was cut off to the embassy area and Canal 36 TV; however, Radio Globo sent out a broadcast that included a call for generators and a pledge by the head of the electrical workers union to send technicians which shortly led to power being restored to the immediate area. The curfew was then extended until 6:00 pm the following day, a drastic measure because it means that all workplaces will be closed during daylight hours.

Installed inside the embassy, Zelaya complained of harassment from the Micheletti government aided by Israeli mercenaries. He claimed they had installed a mobile phone jammer, which he showed to the press, and assaulted the occupants of the embassy with toxic gases and radiation, which allegedly caused nose or stomach bleeding or related symptoms in over 25 people inside the embassy.

On 24 September, Brazil called an emergency meeting of the United Nations Security Council. The Brazilian foreign minister Celso Amorim told the Security Council that "since the day it has sheltered President Zelaya at its premises, the Brazilian Embassy has been virtually under siege" and that "it has been submitted to acts of harassment and intimidation by the de facto authorities". The UN Security Council defended the inviolability of Brazilian embassy and "called upon the de facto government of Honduras to cease harassing the Brazilian embassy and to provide all necessary utilities and services, including water, electricity, food and continuity of communications".

Amnesty International representative Susan Lee described human rights violations by Micheletti's security forces following Zelaya's return as "alarming". These included a "sharp rise in police beatings" and hundreds of arrests of political demonstrators throughout Honduras, and intimidation of human rights defenders by police firing tear gas canisters into the building of the human rights NGO Comité de Familiares de Detenidos Desaparecidos en Honduras (COFADEH), at a moment when about 100 people were in the COFADEH office, many who were in COFADEH to report human rights violations earlier that day. Dozens of the protestors detained were held in unauthorised detention sites in Tegucigalpa on 22 September. Amnesty International also reported limits imposed by the de facto authorities on free speech, in which Radio Globo and the TV channel 36 "suffered power stoppages or constant interruptions to their transmissions which prevented them from broadcasting". Susan Lee stated "The only way forward is for the de facto authorities to stop the policy of repression and violence and instead respect the rights of freedom of expression and association."

On 28 September 2009, after pressure from home and abroad, Micheletti said that he would lift his decree suspending civil liberties. As of 2 October 2009, Mr. Micheletti had not done so, but told a visiting delegation of Republican members of the US Congress that he would lift the decree and restore civil liberties by Monday, 5 October 2009 at the latest, according to a spokesman for a member of the delegation. On 5 October 2009, Micheletti said that he was lifting the decree but also said that the pro-Zelaya media that had been closed down by the de facto government, Radio Globo and Canal 36 TV, would have to appear before the courts to regain their broadcast permits. On 19 October 2009, the decree was reversed in the official gazette.

=== Negotiations and accord ===
On 29 October 2009, the de facto Micheletti government signed an agreement with Zelaya's negotiators that would allow the Honduran Congress to vote on whether the ousted president would be restored and allowed to serve out the few remaining months of his term. Zelaya chose not to give a list of candidates for the unity government to Micheletti, arguing that the Congress was unacceptably delaying the agreed-upon vote on his restoration.

When Micheletti announced he had, unilaterally, formed the unity government without input from Zelaya, Zelaya declared the agreement "dead" early on 6 November. The United States sent diplomats to help to resurrect the pact, but Zelaya insisted that he would not accept any deal to restore him to office if it meant he must recognise the elections of 29 November.

=== Elections ===
With Micheletti indicating that he would temporarily step down to allow voters to concentrate on the upcoming presidential elections, and congressional and judicial leadership refusing to reinstate Zelaya before the elections, Panamá, Costa Rica, and the United States indicated that they would support the outcome, but international support for the elections remained scant leading up to the polls.

In the days preceding the elections, United States, Israel, Italy, Colombia, Panama, Peru, Germany, Costa Rica and Japan also announced their intentions to recognise the results of the elections.

Organisations and individuals in Honduras, including the National Resistance Front against the coup d’État in Honduras, Marvin Ponce of the Democratic Unification Party, and Bertha Oliva of Comité de Familiares de Detenidos Desaparecidos en Honduras, and internationally, including Mercosur, President Cristina Kirchner of Argentina and the Union of South American Nations, said that elections held on 29 November under Micheletti would not be legitimate.

On 29 November 2009, a presidential election was held, according to the Honduran constitution. Five candidates ran for president. Early returns indicate that conservative Porfirio Lobo was elected with around 55% of the votes. Official numbers for the turnout of the election placed it at around 60%, which was subsequently officially revised down to 49% – a considerable decline on the 55% 2005 election turnout.

The European Parliament did not send observers. However, observers were sent by the centre-right European People's Party, who reported a "high degree of civic maturity and exemplar democratic behaviour" during the elections.

=== Zelaya-reinstatement proposal rejected by Congress ===
On 2 December, the National Congress debated regarding the possible reinstatement of Zelaya to the presidency. A vast majority of the lawmakers voted against Zelaya's reinstatement. The 128 member Congress voted 111 to 14 against reinstating Zelaya, affirming its 28 June decision. This decision was made as part of the Tegucigalpa/San Jose Accord, and called on the International Community to respect the decision. Almost all congressmen from Zelaya's own political party as well as the opposition National Party voted against the reinstatement, and supported the victory of Porfirio Lobo Sosa as the new president of Honduras in the November 2009 elections.

Zelaya criticised the vote and urged governments not to restore ties with the incoming administration of Porfirio Lobo. "Today, the lawmakers at the service of the dominant classes ratified the coup d’état in Honduras," Zelaya said in a statement released shortly after the vote. "They have condemned Honduran to exist outside the rule of law.".

On 4 December, Juan Barahona-led activists ended five months of daily protests demanding the reinstatement of Zelaya, saying they are moving on now that Congress has voted to keep Manuel Zelaya out of office. Juan Barahona, who had been leading protests since late June when Zelaya was forced out of the country, said that his supporters are "closing that chapter" of their struggle. Barahona said it's time for Hondurans who support policies in favour of the poor and other themes that Zelaya espoused to shift their focus to the 2013 elections.

=== Second exile ===
On 20 January 2010, the Dominican Republic and President-elect Porfirio Lobo agreed to a deal that would allow Zelaya to be transported safely from the Brazilian embassy in Tegucigalpa where he had been, to the Dominican Republic upon Lobo taking office on 27 January. Lobo stated that he would ensure Zelaya would leave safely and "with dignity". Lobo negotiated with Dominican President Leonel Fernández. Lobo also discussed the situation with former presidential candidates who signed a statement on the agreement, as well as requesting that sanctions placed against Honduras as a result of the incident be lifted. The next day, Zelaya agreed to the deal, while a close advisor said he would remain politically active and hope to later return to political activity.

=== Zelaya's return after charges dropped ===
In May 2011 a court in Honduras dropped all corruption charges against Zelaya, allowing him to return to Honduras. He did so on 28 May 2011 to a massive reception at Toncontin International Airport. On 1 June the OAS voted to re-admit Honduras into the OAS.

=== Future developments ===
In 2015, a Supreme Court decision during the Juan Orlando Hernández administration invalidated Article 239 of the Constitution, allowing him to run for re-election in 2017 (and allowing all former presidents to run for the office again). Zelaya stated that he believed the court did not have a right to unilaterally terminate the Article, again calling for a referendum on the issue. The decision bypassed the entrenched nature of the Article as it was overturned by a court decision, rather than an attempted amendment. After her election, President Xiomara Castro stated that she wished to seek annulment of the order repealing Article 239.

== Reaction ==
No foreign government recognised Micheletti as president. US President Barack Obama, along with leaders and officials of governments throughout the hemisphere and the rest of the world, condemned the removal of President Zelaya as undemocratic and called the action taken against him a coup d’état. However, in the United States, the Congressional Research Service (a nonpartisan entity within the Library of Congress working on behalf of the United States Congress), after studying the relevant texts of Honduran law, determined that "The Supreme Court of Honduras has constitutional and statutory authority to ... request of the assistance of the public forces to enforce its rulings," and did not misapply its authority in this case: "Available sources indicate that the judicial and legislative branches applied constitutional and statutory law in the case against President Zelaya in a manner that was judged by the Honduran authorities from both branches of the government to be in accordance with the Honduran legal system."

Americas-based international organisations such as the Organization of American States, Mercosur, and the Bolivarian Alternative for the Americas also condemned the events. Over ten Latin American countries, as well as all European Union countries, agreed to withdraw their ambassadors from Honduras until Zelaya is returned to power.

- United Nations: A one-page resolution, passed by acclamation in the then 192-member body, condemned the removal of Zelaya as a coup and demanded his "immediate and unconditional restoration" as president. The resolution calls "firmly and categorically on all states to recognize no government other than that" of Zelaya.
- Americas: The OAS called for an emergency meeting on Sunday, where it approved a resolution demanding "the immediate, safe and unconditional return of the constitutional president, Manuel Zelaya". Secretary General José Miguel Insulza called the situation "a military coup". On 4 July 2009, the OAS carried out a prior ultimatum by unanimously suspending Honduras.
- United States: The United States Department of State condemned the ouster of Zelaya and continued to recognise him as the only constitutional president of Honduras. Although US officials characterised the events as a coup, suspended joint military operations on 1 July, suspended all non-emergency, non-immigrant visas, and cut off certain non-humanitarian aid to Honduras, they have held back from formally designating Zelaya's ouster a "military coup", which would require them to cut off almost all aid to Honduras. However, on 24 September, the Law Library of Congress issued a report stating that the Honduran Congress had constitutional power to remove Zelaya from office, but indicating that his expatriation was unconstitutional. On 29 October, LLOC refused to retract the report. The State Department warned the Micheletti government that it might not recognise the results of 29 November elections if Zelaya were not allowed to return to power first, but ultimately recognised the elections at the last second, despite Zelaya not having been returned to power.
- European Union: The European Union called on the Honduran military to release the president and "restore constitutional order". All EU ambassadors had left the country by 2 July.
- The World Bank: World Bank President Robert Zoellick stated that the World Bank had "paused" all lending for development programs to Honduras, said to be around US$80 million for the next fiscal year.
- The nine members of the Bolivarian Alliance for the Americas announced in a joint statement that they would not recognise any new government in Honduras.
- Caribbean: In a press release, CARICOM denounced the coup and voiced its concern over the treatment of Honduran and diplomatic officials during the coup. "The Caribbean Community condemns the military action which has interrupted the democratic process in Honduras and which contravenes the principles of the Inter-American Democratic Charter. The Community therefore calls for the immediate reinstatement of President Zelaya."
- The Association of Caribbean States condemned the coup in a statement and called for Zelaya's reinstatement. Additionally it stated, "we highlight our condemnation of the brutal treatment that Honduras military personnel gave to the Minister of Foreign Affairs, Patricia Rodas as well as the Ambassadors of Cuba, Nicaragua and Venezuela. This situation is a serious violation of International law, and the Vienna Convention on Diplomatic Relations."
- Mercosur and Paraguay: President of Paraguay and current president pro tempore of Mercosur Fernando Lugo condemned the coup and said that no member state of Mercosur will recognise a Honduran government that is not led by Manuel Zelaya. Lugo also called for those behind the coup to be punished by serving prison sentences.
- South American Union and Chile: Chilean president Michelle Bachelet, speaking on behalf of her government and UNASUR, condemned the coup.
- The Inter-American Development Bank (IADB): IADB President Luis Alberto Moreno stated that the IADB is pausing all new loans to Honduras until democracy is restored.
- The Central American Bank for Economic Integration: Central America's development bank says it is provisionally freezing credits to Honduras.

Reactions of individual countries are dealt with in the International reaction to the 2009 Honduran coup d’état.

== See also ==
- Elections in Honduras
- Executive branch of the government of Honduras
- Government of Honduras
- Legal history in Honduras
- Politics of Honduras
