= Rebeca Ráquel =

Honduran judge (born 1954)

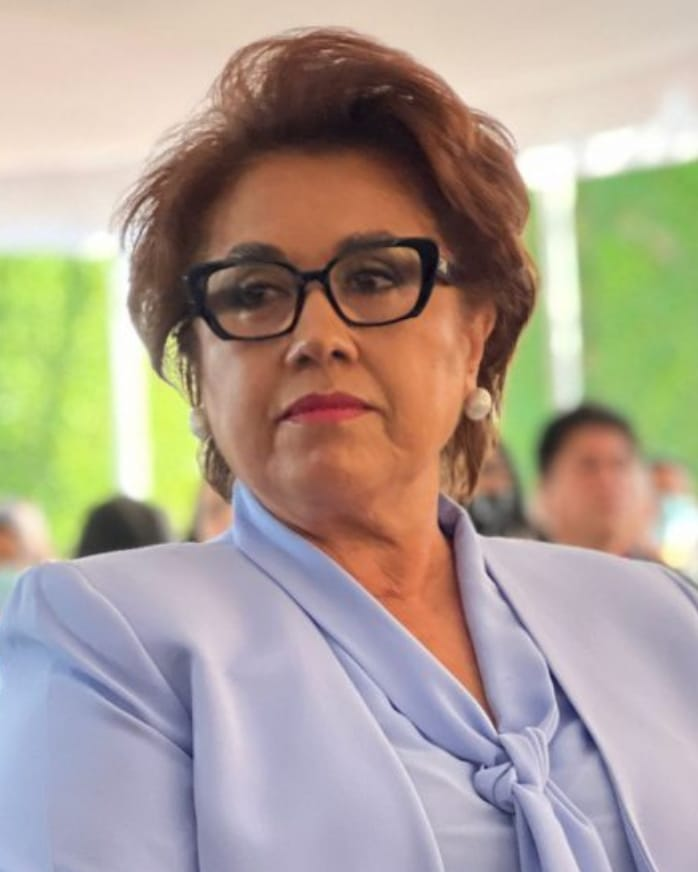

President of the Supreme Court of Honduras
- In office 16 February 2023 – 25 March 2026
- Preceded by: Rolando Argueta
- Succeeded by: Wagner Vallecillo

Personal details
- Born: 11 April 1954 (age 72) Tegucigalpa, Honduras
- Party: Partido Libre
- Children: 4
- Education: National Autonomous University of Honduras

Rebeca Lizette Ráquel Obando (born 11 April 1954) is a Honduran lawyer, public notary and judge. She serves as president of the Supreme Court of Honduras between 2023 and 2026.

== Career ==
Ráquel was born on 11 April 1954 in Tegucigalpa, Honduras. She earned a degree in legal and social sciences from National Autonomous University of Honduras in 2000.

She served as a judge from 2001 to 2006, when she became executive director of the Educational Credit Institute (Educrédito), a position she held until 2009. As a judge, Ráquel specialised in domestic violence. Since 2013, she has practiced law and was licensed to practice as a notary in May 2015. Ráquel is member of the Partido Libre and is a distant relative of then president Xiomara Castro. She has also been linked to the Jericó Mining Company, which was under investigation for ties to drug trafficking.

On 17 February 2023 the Congress of Honduras elected the 15 new judges of the Supreme Court of Honduras and Ráquel as its new president after the nomination by the Supreme Court's Honduras Nominating Committee and Partido Libre. She was elected for the term 2023-2030 and was the second woman to hold the office after Vilma Cecilia Morales. On 25 March 2026 she announced her resignation following the National Congress’s approval of a reform that transferred powers previously held exclusively by the President of the Supreme Court to the full bench of the Court, thus avoiding a possible impeachment.

== Personal life ==
Ráquel is married to a notary and lawyer, which whom have 4 children. She also speaks English.
