= Marlon Pascua =

Honduran politician

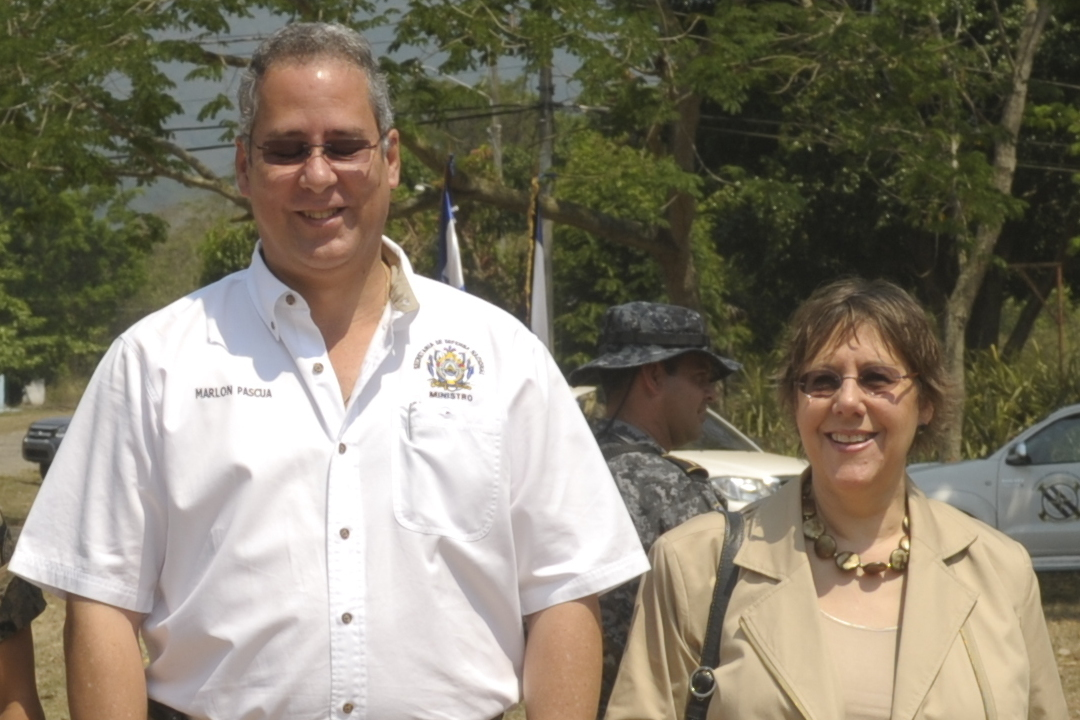
Marlon Pascua with U.S. Ambassador Lisa Kubiske in 2012

Marlon Pascua Cerrato served as the Defense Minister of Honduras from 2010 to 2014.

Political offices
Preceded by Adolfo Lionel Sevilla	Defense Minister of Honduras; 2010–2014	Succeeded by Samuel Reyes Rendón
