= Carlos López Contreras =

Honduran politician

Carlos López Contreras (born January 31, 1942) is a Honduran politician and member of the National Party. He served as Foreign Minister from July 13, 2009 to January 27, 2010 under the interim presidency of Roberto Micheletti. He was an Ambassador in Belgium and in the Netherlands.

He is married to Armida Villela de López Contreras.

Political offices
Preceded by Enrique Ortez (Acting)	Foreign Minister of Honduras (Acting); 2009-2010	Succeeded by Mario Canahuati
