= Bertha Oliva =

Honduran human rights campaigner (born 1956)

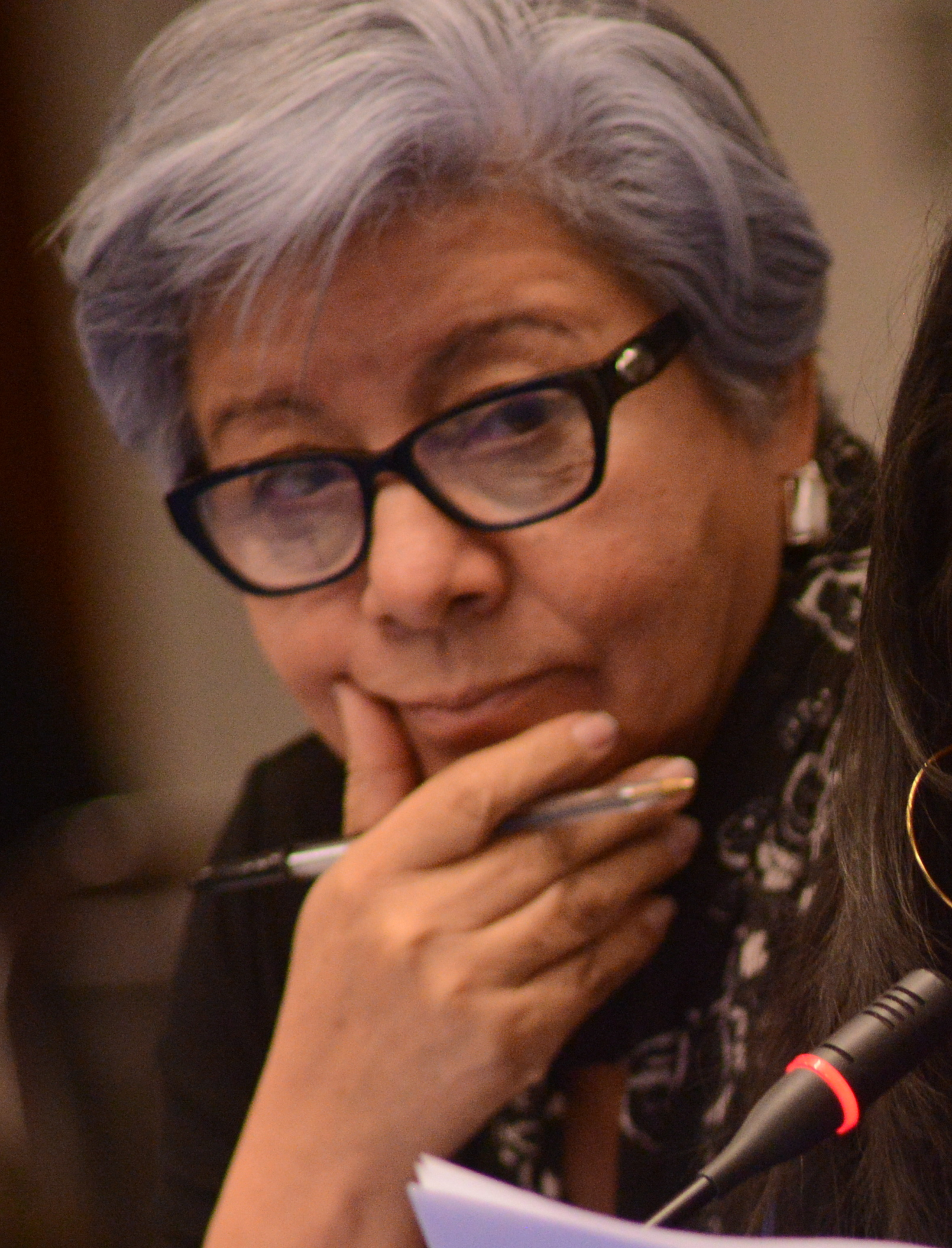
- Bertha Oliva in 2017
- Born: 1956 (age 69–70)
- Occupation: Human rights campaigner

Bertha Oliva Nativí (born c. 1956) is a Honduran human rights campaigner. She is the founder and coordinator of the Committee of Relatives of the Disappeared in Honduras (COFADEH, by its Spanish initials), a non-governmental organization promoting the rights of relatives of the victims of forced disappearances between 1979 and 1989.

Oliva founded the organization after her husband, Prof. Tomás Nativí, founder of the People’s Revolutionary Union (URP), was taken from his home by State forces in June 1981. She was three months pregnant at the time. Her husband has never been seen since.

== Career ==
COFADEH is recognized as having played a major role in the dissolution of Honduras' Department of National Investigations, the repeal of compulsory military service, and the liberation of the country's last political prisoners in 1992.

Oliva, and her organization COFADEH, have been active partners in the Global Response campaign Honduras:Protect Forests and Environmental Activists.

Oliva opposed the 2009 military coup against President Manuel Zelaya. After elections in late 2013 returned the rightwing National Party to power, Bertha Oliva said: "The police and military are using the cover of the US-led war on drugs in Honduras to eliminate many people, maybe including me: I am on the death list again."

== Awards ==
Oliva received the Human Rights Award from Honduras' National Commission on Human Rights, and was nominated along with five other Honduran women as one of the 1000 Peace Women for the Nobel Prize in 2005.

In November 2010, the Dutch government awarded Oliva the 2010 Human Rights Tulip award.

== See also ==
- Human rights in Honduras
