= Mireya Agüero =

Honduran politician (born 1958)

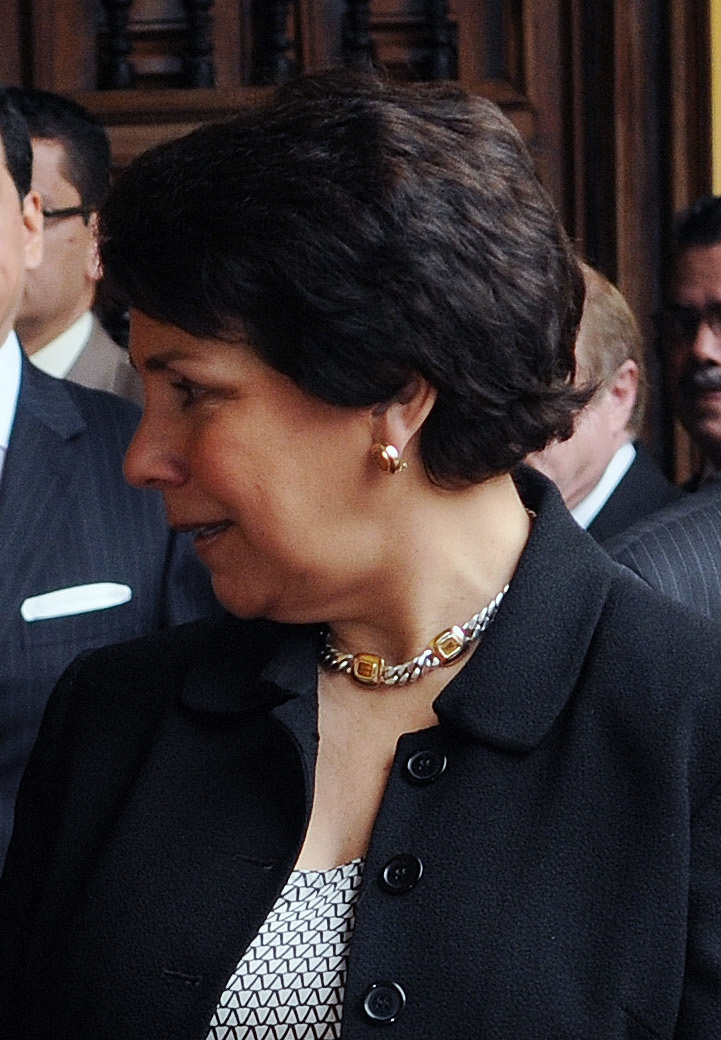
- Agüero in 2013

Minister of Foreign Affairs
- Incumbent
- Assumed office 27 January 2026
- President: Nasry Asfura
- Preceded by: Javier Efraín Bú
- In office 1 May 2013 – 15 November 2014
- President: Porfirio Lobo Sosa; Juan Orlando Hernández
- Preceded by: Arturo Corrales
- Succeeded by: Arturo Corrales

Personal details
- Born: 1958 (age 67–68) Tegucigalpa, Honduras
- Party: National
- Spouse: Héctor Luis Corrales Barahona
- Children: 4
- Relatives: María Dolores Agüero (niece)
- Occupation: Lawyer • Diplomat • Politician

Mireya Agüero or Mireya Agüero de Corrales (born 1958) is a Honduran politician who is currently serving as minister for foreign affairs since 2026, and previously from 2013 to 2014.

== Career ==
Agüero has a law degree and a degree in international relations. She joined the civil service in 1981 and the foreign service in 1983.

She rose through the ranks and was made a Minister for Foreign Affairs for Honduras in May 2013. Agüero was appointed by President Porfirio Lobo following a brief period as Vice Minister to replace Arturo Corrales who had been moved to Minister of Security.

Agüero worked under the new President Juan Orlando Hernández the following year, but she tendered her resignation in 2014 and it took effect on 15 November.

In October 2015 it was announced that President Hernández was appointing Agüero's niece, María Dolores Agüero, to be the vice Minister of Foreign Affairs.

On 25 January 2026, President-elect Nasry Asfura announced Agüero as the new Minister of Foreign Affairs.
