= Milton Jiménez =

Honduran lawyer and politician

Milton Danilo Jiménez Puerto (born November 8, 1961) is a Honduran lawyer and was Foreign Minister of Honduras from 2006 to 2008.

== Biography ==
Milton Jiménez at 20 years of age was a law student at the National Autonomous University of Honduras and an activist in the Revolutionary University Force (Fuerza Universitaria Revolucionaria-FUR) when he was temporarily detained-disappeared in April 1982. His case illustrates the circumstances of the arrest, detention, and the torture suffered by those detained, and evidences the existence of clandestine jails. It also reveals the subordinate role of the judicial branch, according to The Preliminary Report on Disappearances of the National Commissioner for the Protection of Human Rights in Honduras. Jiménez was nominee for the Letelier-Moffit Award on Human Rights, in 1990. Jiménez became a successful practicing lawyer.

== Foreign minister ==
Jiménez resigned as foreign minister on January 3, 2008, following his arrest for drink-driving on December 30, 2007. The day before his resignation, a local television channel broadcast video of his arrest. When announcing his resignation, Jiménez, who was visibly bruised and had a black eye, said that he had made a mistake, but he also alleged that the police had punched him.

Political offices
| Preceded by Leonidas Rosa Bautista | Foreign Minister of Honduras; 2006-2008 | Succeeded by Edmundo Orellana |
