= Canal 36 =

Television station in Honduras

Canal 36 is a television station in Honduras. It was briefly closed down by order of the government of Roberto Micheletti on September 28, 2009 during the 2009 Honduran constitutional crisis, along with Radio Globo, because of its support for deposed President of Honduras Manuel Zelaya, but then was re-opened. It is owned by Esdras Amado Lopez.
