= Enrique Ortez =

Honduran politician (1931–2022)

Enrique Ortez Colindres (29 October 1931 – 30 March 2022) was a Honduran politician and member of the Liberal Party who came to prominence during his time as Foreign Minister in the interim government of Roberto Micheletti in 2009.

== Racial comments concerning Obama ==
During a television interview on June 29, 2009, Ortez commented that U.S. president Barack Obama, who refused to back the coup or to recognize the interim government as legitimate, was "un negrito que no sabe nada de nada" (English: a little black man who knows nothing about nothing); he also referred to Obama as "el negrito del batey" (translated as a black plantation worker). The US ambassador to Honduras, Hugo Llorens, expressed outrage regarding Ortez's comments, and the anti-coup movement both in and outside of Honduras used Ortez's comments against the government. Ortez sent a letter of apology to the White House and was reassigned to the office of minister for justice on July 10.

== Death ==
He died on 30 March 2022 at the age of 90.

Political offices
Preceded by Patricia Rodas	Foreign Minister of Honduras (Acting); 2009	Succeeded by Carlos López Contreras (Acting)
