= Committee of Relatives of the Disappeared in Honduras =

Human rights NGO in Honduras

Committee of Relatives of the Disappeared in Honduras (COFADEH, Spanish: Comité de Familiares de Detenidos Desaparecidos en Honduras) is a human rights NGO in Honduras founded in 1982 by 12 families of disappeared Hondurans, including Bertha Oliva de Nativí (also spelt: Berta, Olivia), whose husband Professor Tomás Nativí was disappeared in 1981.

== Background ==
Honduras had a history of several coups d'etat and military governments during the second half of the twentieth century. A civilian government was elected in 1981, but human rights violations continued. The military unit Battalion 3-16, which received training and support from the United States Central Intelligence Agency both in Honduras and at U.S. military bases and in Chile during the presidency of the dictator Augusto Pinochet., carried out political assassinations and torture of suspected political opponents of the government. Amnesty International estimated that at least 184 people were "disappeared" from 1980 to 1992 in Honduras, most likely by the Honduran military.

== Creation ==
According to COFADEH, people from 69 families in Honduras were disappeared in 1982. At the end of the year, 12 families, including Bertha Oliva de Nativí, whose husband Professor Tomás Nativí was disappeared in 1981, created COFADEH.

COFADEH became a legally recognised organisation in 2001.

== Aims ==
COFADEH states that its original aim was to get back their disappeared family members alive. It says that this has been achieved in some cases, but not for the majority. It claims that "between 1980 and 1989 at least 184 persons disappeared without any investigation carried out by the state nor with any conviction of [those] responsible." Since then it has extended its aims to include other severe violations of human rights, promotion and education of human rights, and "investigation and legal documentation of cases".

== Threats against COFADEH members ==
COFADEH states that Bertha Oliva de Nativi, other members of COFADEH and their families have "been a target of constant threats", stating that "Almost all of them have received threats, some have been assaulted, kidnapped and followed." Amnesty International states that Bertha Oliva received "two death threats" on 27 January 2009 and an "act of surveillance" on 11 March 2009.

On 22 September 2009, following the return of elected president Manuel Zelaya to Honduras during the 2009 Honduran constitutional crisis, 15 police under the responsibility of de facto president Roberto Micheletti fired tear gas canisters at the COFADEH office in Tegucigalpa, at a moment when about 100 people were in the COFADEH office. Amnesty International stated that the attack occurred when a large number of people were at the COFADEH office to report human rights violations that had occurred earlier that day.

== Interactions with international human rights organisations ==
COFADEH was interviewed in June 2002 by the United Nations High Commissioner for Refugees regarding whether or not Battalion 3-16 still existed. The COFADEH representative replied that Battalion 3-16 had taken various forms since 1979.
