= Enrique Flores Lanza =

Honduran lawyer and politician

Enrique Flores Lanza is a Honduran lawyer and politician. He was appointed Minister of the Presidency under Mel Zelaya in January 2008, having previously been the president's legal advisor. Described by one source as "a famous human rights lawyer", he has been a member of the Committee for the Defense of Human Rights in Honduras (CODEH) as well as "director of the Consultorio Juridico Popular, a national NGO that defends women's and children's rights... [and] consultant to the Instituto Interamericano de los Derechos del Nino". In the 1980s he was a "legal advisor to the Direccion General de Tributacion" under the government of President Roberto Suazo Cordova (1982-1986).

He has also been a professor in the Faculty of Economics at the Universidad Nacional Autónoma de Honduras (UNAH).

During Zelaya's run for the presidency Flores was described as "secretary of political training on the CCEPL."
