= La Gaceta (Honduras) =

- Owner: Government of Honduras
- Founded: November 7, 1890; 135 years ago
- Country: Honduras
- Website: https://enag.gob.hn/index.php/gaceta-digital

La Gaceta (Spanish; The Gazette), commonly referred to as Official Journal The Gazette, is the official newspaper of the Honduras government, written and published in Tegucigalpa. All legal provisions are published in it.

The Honduran Constitution mandates that all laws must be published in The Gazette, which enters into force 20 days later, unless otherwise is indicated for both cases. It also mandates that all administrative acts of any State body with general legal effects, as well as rulings of unconstitutionality, be published by this medium.

== History ==
The first printing press to arrive in Honduras was brought by general Francisco Morazán in 1829. It was installed in the San Francisco Barracks in Tegucigalpa, where it was run by Cayetano Castro, a Nicaraguan. The next year, the first official newspaper of the Republic of Honduras, The Gazette of the Government, was founded under the direction of the minister general of the Government, Liberato Moncada. It had only 13 issues of 4 pages each, the first of them being published on May 26. The journal was suspended due to the invasion of general Vicente Domínguez at the northern zone. Afterwards there were many official newspapers:

Chronology
Official name	Circulation period	Printing place	Notes
The Gazette of the Government	1830 (13 numbers)	Tegucigalpa	First official journal
Official Knowledge	December 1831 - March 1832 (7 numbers)		Discontinued after the invasion of general Vicente Domínguez
Official Bulletin of the State of Honduras Supreme Government	June 1832 - May 1834	Comayagua	National printing house
Gazette of the State of Honduras Supreme Government	June 1835 - March 28, 1837	Comayagua	
Official Weekly of Honduras	March 1837 - March 1838	Comayagua	
Official Political Thermometer	March 1838 - July 20, 1839	Comayagua	
The Official Editor of Honduras	September 15, 1840 - 1848	Comayagua	Published twice in a month, anti-unionism and defamatory of Francisco Morazán
The Stenographer of the National Diet (Note: Diet: Payment granted to Congress representatives and delegates to cover for duty expenses.)	1847		
Official Gazette of Honduras	1848 - 1864 (13 numbers)		
Official Bulletin of the Honduras Supreme Government	January 16, 1851 - August 15, 1851 (16 numbers)	Comayagua	Printing house of José María Sánchez
The Official Body	Early 1862 - July 8, 1862 (20 numbers)	Guarita and after Santa Rosa de Copán	
Gazette of Honduras, after Official Gazette of Honduras	1862 - December 31, 1862 (71 numbers)	Comayagua	
Official Gazette	1864		
Official Gazette of Honduras	1864 - 1868	Comayagua	
Official Gazette	June 20, 1871 - 1871	Comayagua	Three times a month
Official Bulletin	1871 - 1873	Comayagua	Complemento of The Gazette
The National	February 18, 1874 - December 1875	Tegucigalpa	Official journal of the transitory government
Official Gazette of the Honduras Government	October 25, 1876 - 1877	Comayagua	
Gazette of Honduras	February 7, 1877 - August 25, 1877		
The Gazette	November 7, 1890 – present day (as of 2025)	Tegucigalpa	

Previously, in addition to publishing laws and decrees, official newspapers included poetry (such as that of Father Reyes) proclamations and news from other Central American countries, while currently they are limited to publishing legal content.

The Gazette is currently printed and published by the National Graphic Arts Company (ENAG), an administratively autonomous public institution.
