= Patricia Rodas =

Honduran politician (born 1960)

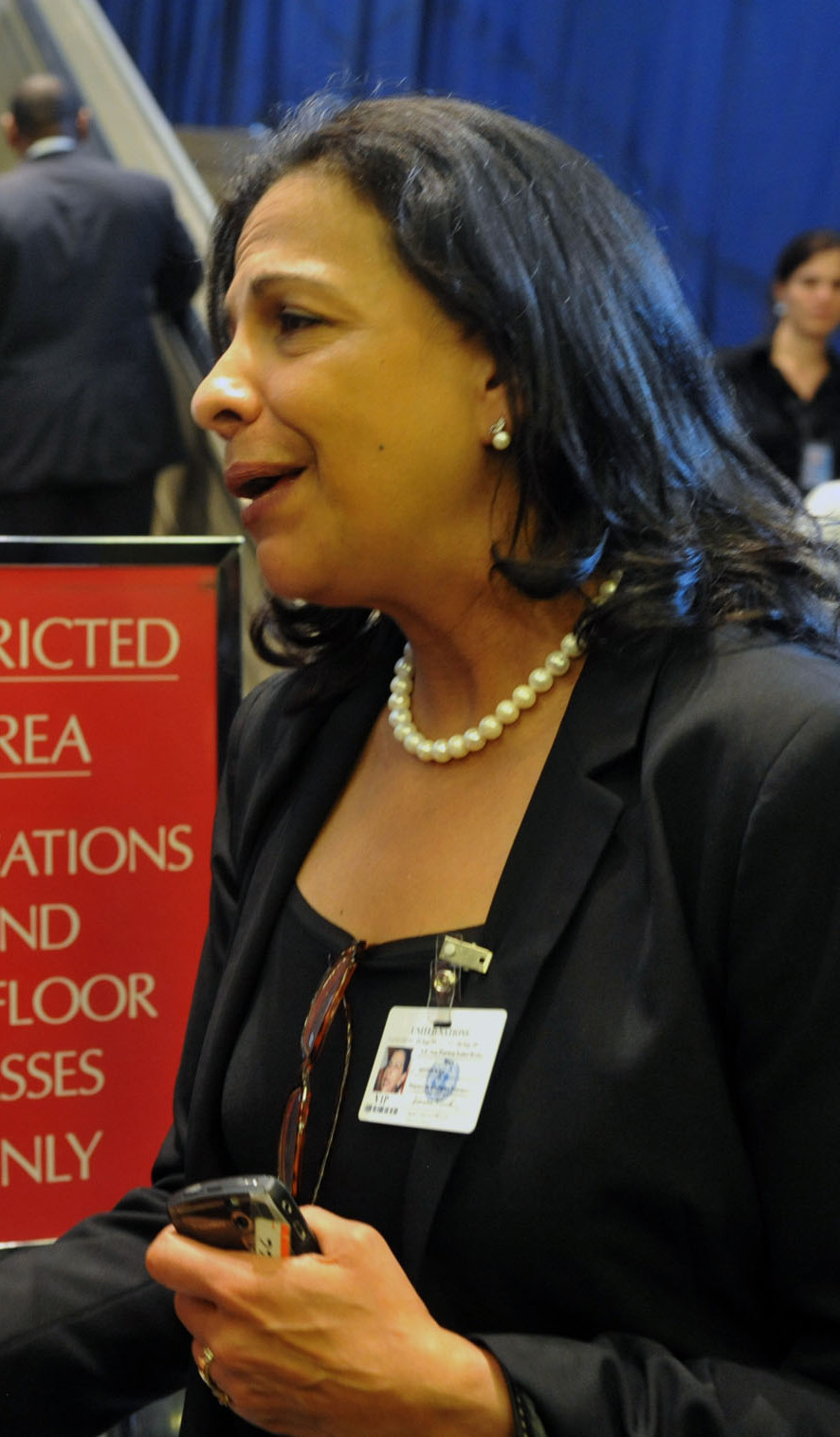

Minister of Foreign Affairs
- In office January 6, 2009 – June 28, 2009
- President: Manuel Zelaya

Personal details
- Born: June 22, 1960 (age 66) Comayagüela, Honduras
- Party: Liberty and Refoundation
- Other political affiliations: Liberal Party of Honduras (former)
- Parents: Modesto Rodas Alvarado (father); Margarita Baca Saravia (mother)
- Education: International University of Andalucía (PhD); Autonomus University of Honduras (BA)

Patricia Isabel Rodas Baca (born 22 June 1960) is a Honduran politician who is a former Minister for Foreign Affairs and leading member of the Liberal Party of Honduras. Deposed in July 2009, she subsequently played a role in establishing the Liberty and Refoundation party.

== Biography ==
Patricia Rodas is the daughter of the former president of the National Congress of Honduras, Modesto Rodas Alvarado, a popular left-wing leader within the Liberal Party whose presidential candidacy in 1963 was deliberately halted by a coup d’état that sacked Ramón Villeda Morales from office and installed military rule. She began her own political career in the Liberal Party, rising to the role of President of the party's Central Executive Council, before being appointed foreign minister in the government of Manuel Zelaya.

=== 2009 Honduran constitutional crisis ===
Deposed during the 2009 Honduran constitutional crisis, she was held captive by the Honduran military and forced into exile in Mexico. While there, she became a spokesperson for Zelaya in his attempts to regain the presidency.

== See also ==
- Manuel Zelaya § Constitutional crisis

Political offices
| Preceded by Edmundo Orellana | Foreign Minister of Honduras; 2009 | Succeeded by Enrique Ortez (Acting) |
