= Arturo Corrales =

Honduran politician

Arturo Gerardo Corrales Álvarez is a former Foreign Minister and Security Minister of Honduras. In October 2016, he became a special envoy to the United States “charged with improving ties with the United States as the two countries work together to stabilize the Central American region and reduce the surge of migrants to the north.“ He was also President of the Christian Democratic Party of Honduras and ran for President on their ticket.

Corrales resigned his position as Foreign Minister due to a scandal concerning an alleged cover up of police involvement in assassination plots while he was Security Minister.

He studied civil engineering at the National Autonomous University of Honduras (UNAH) and earned a Master's Degree in Engineering, in Management Engineering, from the University of Florida, Gainesville.
