= 2015–16 Honduran Cup =

Honduran Cup
Copa Presidente

Tournament details
- Country: Honduras
- Dates: 7 October 2015 – 23 July 2016
- Teams: 64

Final positions
- Champions: Juticalpa
- Runners-up: Real España
- Third place: Olimpia
- Fourth place: Real Sociedad

Tournament statistics
- Matches played: 70
- Goals scored: 203 (2.9 per match)
- All statistics correct as of 23 July 2016.

The 2015–16 Honduran Cup was the 11th staging of the Honduran Cup and the second edition as Copa Presidente. Olimpia were the defending champions. The cup was a creation of the Honduran government funded by money allocated to national security fund. Its purpose was to support the growth of sport to detract the youth from vices and to promote national tourism for rural towns.

The cup was contested by 64 teams from the top 3 divisions of the country. There was a total of 10 teams from Liga Nacional (1st division), 27 from Liga de Ascenso (2nd division) and 27 from Liga Mayor (3rd division). It was the first time in which the tournament covered two calendar years.

Juticalpa F.C. obtained its first title after defeating Real C.D. España in the final match.

== Participants ==
Liga Nacional

Honduras Progreso (El Progreso, Yoro)
Juticalpa (Juticalpa, Olancho)
Marathón (San Pedro Sula, Cortés)
Motagua (Tegucigalpa, Francisco Morazán)
Olimpia (Tegucigalpa, Francisco Morazán)

Platense (Puerto Cortés, Cortés)
Real España (San Pedro Sula, Cortés)
Real Sociedad (Tocoa, Colón)
Victoria (La Ceiba, Atlántida)
Vida (La Ceiba, Atlántida)

Liga de Ascenso

Liga Mayor

== Schedule and format ==
The first round started on 7 October 2015 and the final is scheduled to be held on 23 July 2016.

Round	Date		Fixtures	Clubs
Round	First leg	Second leg	Fixtures	Clubs
Round of 64	7–8 October 2015		32	64 → 32
Round of 32	4–5 November 2015		16	32 → 16
Round of 16	13 January 2016		8	16 → 8
Quarterfinals	17 February 2016	1–2 March 2016	8	8 → 4
Semifinals	23–24 March 2016	13 April 2016	4	4 → 2
Third place playoff	22 July 2016		1	—
Final	23 July 2016		1	2 → 1

== Prize fund ==
Round	Prize fund per club
3rd place team	L. 100,000
2nd place team	L. 300,000
2015–16 Honduran Cup Winner	L. 500,000

== Round of 64 ==
7 October 2015 Round of 64	Fluminense	0–1	Juticalpa	Jacaleapa, El Paraíso
13:00 (UTC−06:00)			Martínez	Stadium: Estadio Alberto Salinas

7 October 2015 Round of 64	Gracias a Dios	0–1	Victoria	Puerto Lempira, Gracias a Dios
13:00 (UTC−06:00)			29' Ramírez	Stadium: Estadio Municipal

7 October 2015 Round of 64	Juventud Para Cristo	1–4	Platense	La Entrada, Copán
14:00 (UTC−06:00)	Rojas 59'		2' Monje; 10' Abadía; 63' 72' Lalín	Stadium: Estadio Alsacias

7 October 2015 Round of 64	Gualaco	0–2	Atlético Olanchano	Gualaco, Olancho
14:00 (UTC−06:00)			Núñez; Murillo	Stadium: Estadio Municipal

7 October 2015 Round of 64	Gremio	1–4	Jaguares UPNFM	Nacaome, Valle
14:00 (UTC−06:00)			Turcios; Ramos; Tilguath	Stadium: Estadio José Elizas Nasar

7 October 2015 Round of 64	San Lorenzo	2–0	Alianza de Becerra	San Lorenzo, Valle
14:00 (UTC−06:00)				Stadium: Estadio Ángel Augusto Martínez

7 October 2015 Round of 64	Real Juventud (LP)	1–2	Comayagua	La Paz, La Paz
14:30 (UTC−06:00)				Stadium: Estadio Roberto Suazo Córdoba

7 October 2015 Round of 64	San Juan Bosco	1–2	Motagua	Choluteca, Choluteca
15:00 (UTC−06:00)	Pérez 36'		44' Hernández; 46' Gómez; (red card) 74' Peralta	Stadium: Estadio Fausto Flores Lagos; Referee: Said Martínez

7 October 2015 Round of 64	Racing	1–5	Atlético Esperanzano	Ojos de Agua, Comayagua
15:00 (UTC−06:00)				Stadium: Estadio Municipal

7 October 2015 Round of 64	Milán	2–3	Honduras Progreso	La Masica, Atlántida
15:00 (UTC−06:00)	Herrera		40' Rice; 53' (pen.) Alvarado; 82' Solís	Stadium: Estadio Masiqueño

7 October 2015 Round of 64	Pinares	1–6	Olimpia	Catacamas, Olancho
15:00 (UTC−06:00)	Acosta 39'		1' 24' 81' Rojas; 5' Mejía; 20' 34' Velásquez	Stadium: Estadio Rubén Guifarro; Referee: Manuel Zelaya

7 October 2015 Round of 64	Candelaria	1–3	Real España	Candelaria, Lempira
16:00 (UTC−06:00)	Padilla 88' (pen.)		2' Mejía; 90' Barahona	Stadium: Estadio Marco Augusto Hernández; Referee: Geovanny Mendoza

7 October 2015 Round of 64	Lempira	3–3 (5–4 p)	Atlético Municipal (SC)	Taulabé, Comayagua
16:00 (UTC−06:00)				Stadium: Estadio Rafael Leonardo Callejas

7 October 2015 Round of 64	Gimnástico	5–1	Español	Tegucigalpa, Francisco Morazán
17:00 (UTC−06:00)				Stadium: Cancha Emilio Larach

7 October 2015 Round of 64	Atlético Halcón Júnior	2–2 (1–3 p)	Atlético Limeño	San Pedro Sula, Cortés
18:00 (UTC−06:00)				Stadium: Estadio Francisco Morazán

7 October 2015 Round of 64	Empa	0–1	Vida	El Progreso, Yoro
19:00 (UTC−06:00)				Stadium: Estadio Humberto Micheletti

7 October 2015 Round of 64	Social Sol	3–2	Yoro	Olanchito, Yoro
19:00 (UTC−06:00)				Stadium: Estadio San Jorge

7 October 2015 Round of 64	Villanueva	3–4	Nacional	Villanueva, Cortés
19:00 (UTC−06:00)				Stadium: Estadio José Adrián Cruz

7 October 2015 Round of 64	Real Juventud (SB)	2–2 (4–5 p)	Espartano	Santa Bárbara, Santa Bárbara
19:00 (UTC−06:00)				Stadium: Estadio Argelio Sabillón

7 October 2015 Round of 64	Trinidad	0–2	Marathón	Trinidad, Santa Bárbara
19:30 (UTC−06:00)			40' Benedith; 86' Castro	Stadium: Cancha de Las Américas

8 October 2015 Round of 64	Independiente (MJ)	1–3	Valle	Monjarás, Choluteca
14:00 (UTC−06:00)				Stadium: Estadio Evaristo Najar Romero

8 October 2015 Round of 64	San Antonio	1–3	Lepaera	San Marcos, Ocotepeque
15:00 (UTC−06:00)				Stadium: Estadio Francis

8 October 2015 Round of 64	Sutrasco	3–1	Tela	Coyoles Central, Yoro
15:00 (UTC−06:00)				Stadium: Estadio Rafael Ruiz Leiva

8 October 2015 Round of 64	Juventud Otoreña	1–4	Atlético Independiente	Jesús de Otoro, Intibucá
15:00 (UTC−06:00)				Stadium: Estadio Manuel Castillo Girón

8 October 2015 Round of 64	Independiente (CN)	3–2	Valencia	Cantarranas, Francisco Morazán
15:00 (UTC−06:00)				Stadium: Estadio Francisco Gaytán

8 October 2015 Round of 64	Juventus Valencia	0–3	Real Sociedad	Roatán, Bay Islands
15:30 (UTC−06:00)				Stadium: Estadio Juan Galindo

8 October 2015 Round of 64	Strikers	1–0	Arsenal	Roatán, Bay Islands
15:30 (UTC−06:00)				Stadium: Estadio Luis Abbott

8 October 2015 Round of 64	Atlético Municipal (TC)	2–2 (5–3 p)	Trujillo	Tocoa, Colón
15:30 (UTC−06:00)				Stadium: Estadio Municipal

8 October 2015 Round of 64	Sula	1–1 (4–3 p)	Olimpia Occidental	Macuelizo, Santa Bárbara
16:00 (UTC−06:00)				Stadium: Estadio Meliton Dubón

8 October 2015 Round of 64	Concepción	1–1 (5–4 p)	Deportes Savio	San Marcos, Ocotepeque
17:00 (UTC−06:00)				Stadium: Estadio Francis

8 October 2015 Round of 64	Bucanero	2–2 (3–1 p)	Atlético Boca Júnior	La Ceiba, Atlántida
19:00 (UTC−06:00)				Stadium: Estadio Nilmo Edwards

8 October 2015 Round of 64	Parrillas One	1–0	Atlético Choloma	San Pedro Sula, Cortés
19:00 (UTC−06:00)				Stadium: Estadio Francisco Morazán

== Round of 32 ==
4 November 2015 Round of 32	San Lorenzo	0–2	Olimpia	San Lorenzo, Valle
14:00 (UTC−06:00)			Mejía; Rojas	Stadium: Estadio Ángel Augusto Martínez

4 November 2015 Round of 32	Independiente (CN)	0–1	Motagua	Cantarranas, Francisco Morazán
15:00 (UTC−06:00)			58' Silva	Stadium: Estadio Francisco Gaytán

4 November 2015 Round of 32	Lempira	0–3	Valle	Taulabé, Comayagua
15:00 (UTC−06:00)				Stadium: Estadio Rafael Leonardo Callejas

4 November 2015 Round of 32	Atlético Olanchano	2–1	Jaguares UPNFM	Catacamas, Olancho
15:00 (UTC−06:00)				Stadium: Estadio Rubén Guifarro

4 November 2015 Round of 32	Atlético Limeño	1–0	Espartano	La Lima, Cortés
15:00 (UTC−06:00)				Stadium: Estadio Limeño

4 November 2015 Round of 32	Sutrasco	1–1 (3–4 p)	Vida	Coyoles Central, Yoro
15:00 (UTC−06:00)	Figueroa 56'		53' Álvarez	Stadium: Estadio Rafael Ruiz Leiva

4 November 2015 Round of 32	Atlético Municipal (TC)	1–1 (3–4 p)	Honduras Progreso	Tocoa, Colón
15:00 (UTC−06:00)

4 November 2015 Round of 32	Concepción	0–1	Marathón	San Marcos, Ocotepeque
15:00 (UTC−06:00)			Cunningham	Stadium: Estadio Francis

4 November 2015 Round of 32	Nacional	Forfeit	Real Sociedad	Villanueva, Cortés
16:00 (UTC−06:00)				Stadium: Estadio José Adrián Cruz

4 November 2015 Round of 32	Sula	0–1	Real España	Macuelizo, Santa Bárbara
16:00 (UTC−06:00)				Stadium: Estadio Meliton Dubón

4 November 2015 Round of 32	Comayagua	0–1	Juticalpa	Comayagua, Comayagua
18:00 (UTC−06:00)				Stadium: Estadio Carlos Miranda

4 November 2015 Round of 32	Lepaera	0–0 (6–7 p)	Atlético Esperanzano	Lepaera, Lempira
18:00 (UTC−06:00)

4 November 2015 Round of 32	Parrillas One	2–1	Platense	San Pedro Sula, Cortés
19:00 (UTC−06:00)				Stadium: Estadio Francisco Morazán

4 November 2015 Round of 32	Gimnástico	0–0 (3–4 p)	Atlético Independiente	Tegucigalpa, Francisco Morazán
19:00 (UTC−06:00)				Stadium: Cancha Emilio Larach

4 November 2015 Round of 32	Social Sol	1–1 (4–5 p)	Victoria	Olanchito, Yoro
19:00 (UTC−06:00)				Stadium: Estadio San Jorge

5 November 2015 Round of 32	Strikers	1–1 (5–6 p)	Atlético Boca Júnior	Roatán, Bay Islands
14:00 (UTC−06:00)				Stadium: Estadio Luis Abbott

== Round of 16 ==
13 January 2016 Round of 16	Atlético Limeño	0–1	Marathón	La Lima, Cortés
14:00 (UTC−06:00)			73' Reyes	Stadium: Estadio Limeño; Referee: David Cruz

13 January 2016 Round of 16	Atlético Boca Júnior	2–2 (4–5 p)	Real España	Tocoa, Colón
15:00 (UTC−06:00)	Ortiz 18'; Yánez 59'		12' Vargas; 44' Arita	Stadium: Estadio Roberto Martínez
	Penalties
	Barralaga (penalty missed); Ponce (penalty scored); Ortiz (penalty scored); Castellanos (penalty scored); Calderón (penalty scored)		(penalty scored) Romero; (penalty scored) Vargas; (penalty scored) Arita; (penalty scored) Torres; (penalty scored) Chávez

13 January 2016 Round of 16	Atlético Olanchano	0–1	Juticalpa	Catacamas, Olancho
15:00 (UTC−06:00)			Mejía	Stadium: Estadio Rubén Guifarro; Referee: Melvin Matamoros

13 January 2016 Round of 16	Atlético Esperanzano	0–1	Motagua	La Esperanza, Intibucá
15:30 (UTC−06:00)			38' Hernández	Stadium: Estadio Romualdo Bueso; Referee: Said Martínez

13 January 2016 Round of 16	Valle	0–6	Olimpia	Nacaome, Valle
16:00 (UTC−06:00)			17' Quioto; 26' Bengoché; 63' Güity; 77' Álvarez; 80' 89' Estupiñán	Stadium: Estadio José Elias Nazar

13 January 2016 Round of 16	Vida	1–0	Victoria	La Ceiba, Atlántida
19:00 (UTC−06:00)	Canales 90' (pen.)			Stadium: Estadio Nilmo Edwards; Referee: Marlon Díaz

13 January 2016 Round of 16	Atlético Independiente	1–2	Real Sociedad	Siguatepeque, Comayagua
19:00 (UTC−06:00)				Stadium: Estadio Roberto Martínez Ávila

13 January 2016 Round of 16	Parrillas One	3–5	Honduras Progreso	San Pedro Sula, Cortés
19:30 (UTC−06:00)	Grant 44'; Salazar 70' (pen.); Valerio 84'		5' 37' González; 18' (pen.) 77' Elvir; 32' Moncada	Stadium: Estadio Olímpico Metropolitano; Referee: Orlando Hernández

== Quarterfinals ==
=== 1st legs ===
17 February 2016 Quarterfinals	Juticalpa	0–0	Motagua	Juticalpa, Olancho
17:00 (UTC−06:00)				Stadium: Estadio Juan Ramón Brevé Vargas; Referee: Nelson Salgado

17 February 2016 Quarterfinals	Real España	1–0	Marathón	San Pedro Sula, Cortés
19:00 (UTC−06:00)	Chávez 71'			Stadium: Estadio Francisco Morazán

17 February 2016 Quarterfinals	Honduras Progreso	2–2	Olimpia	El Progreso, Yoro
19:00 (UTC−06:00)	Rice 35'; Alvarado 82' (pen.)		65' Estupiñán; 73' Elis	Stadium: Estadio Humberto Micheletti

17 February 2016 Quarterfinals	Vida	2–2	Real Sociedad	La Ceiba, Atlántida
19:00 (UTC−06:00)	Canales 32' 90'		4' 18' Martínez	Stadium: Estadio Nilmo Edwards

=== 2nd legs ===
1 March 2016 Quarterfinals	Olimpia	2–1	Honduras Progreso	Tegucigalpa, Francisco Morazán
19:00 (UTC−06:00)	Alvarado (penalty missed) 84' (pen.); Johnson 54'		13' (pen.) Zaldívar	Stadium: Estadio Tiburcio Carías Andino; Referee: Said Martínez

2 March 2016 Quarterfinals	Real Sociedad	2–0	Vida	Sonaguera, Colón
15:00 (UTC−06:00)	Martínez 23'; Abbott 82'			Stadium: Estadio Juan de Dios Martínez

2 March 2016 Quarterfinals	Marathón	1–0 (2–4 p)	Real España	San Pedro Sula, Cortés
15:00 (UTC−06:00)	Suazo 88'			Stadium: Estadio Yankel Rosenthal
	Penalties
	Reyes (penalty missed); Moreira (penalty missed); Palacios (penalty scored); Martínez (penalty scored)		(penalty scored) Acosta; (penalty missed) Benavídez; (penalty scored) Gutiérrez; (penalty scored) Delgado; (penalty scored) López

2 March 2016 Quarterfinals	Motagua	1–1	Juticalpa	Tegucigalpa, Francisco Morazán
19:00 (UTC−06:00)	Silva 68'		33' Mejía	Stadium: Estadio Tiburcio Carías Andino

== Semifinals ==
=== 1st legs ===
23 March 2016 Semifinals	Juticalpa	3–2	Real Sociedad	Juticalpa, Olancho
18:00 (UTC−06:00)	Peña 44'; Ramírez 50' 90+5'		61' 81' Altamirano	Stadium: Estadio Juan Ramón Brevé Vargas; Referee: Manuel Zelaya

24 March 2016 Semifinals	Real España	1–1	Olimpia	San Pedro Sula, Cortés
19:00 (UTC−06:00)	Arita 90'		11' Rojas	Stadium: Estadio Francisco Morazán; Referee: Raúl Castro

=== 2nd legs ===
13 April 2016 Semifinals	Real Sociedad	2–3	Juticalpa	Tocoa, Colón
15:00 (UTC−06:00)	Martínez 14' 38'		32' Lanza; 46' Padilla; 47' Caetano	Stadium: Estadio Francisco Martínez Durón

13 April 2016 Semifinals	Olimpia	0–3	Real España	Tegucigalpa, Francisco Morazán
19:00 (UTC−06:00)			21' Arita; 60' López; 90+1' de Souza	Stadium: Estadio Tiburcio Carías Andino

== Third place match ==
22 July 2016 3rd place	Olimpia	3–1	Real Sociedad	Villanueva, Cortés
19:00 (UTC−06:00)	Costly 30' 38'; Mejía 79' (pen.)		24' Peña	Stadium: Estadio José Adrián Cruz

== Final ==
23 July 2016
17:00 (UTC−06:00)
Final

Juticalpa	2–1	Real España
Mejía 67'; Oviedo 86' (pen.)		45' Zalazar

Estadio Carlos Miranda
Comayagua, Comayagua
Referee: Armando Castro

Juticalpa	Real España

GK	1	(Argentina) Sebastián Portigliatti
DF	2	(Honduras) Marlon Peña	(yellow card) 56'
DF	19	(Honduras) Sergio Mendoza
MF	3	(Honduras) Erick Peña
MF	5	(Honduras) Jesús Munguía
MF	16	(Honduras) Esdras Padilla	(substituted off) 89'
MF	30	(Honduras) José Williams
FW	8	(Honduras) Edwin León	(substituted off) 63'
FW	20	(Honduras) Juan Mejía	(substituted off) 79'
FW	21	(Honduras) Rony Flores
FW	24	(Honduras) Sendel Cruz
Substitutions:
–	–	(Honduras) Aldo Oviedo	(substituted on) 63'
FW	9	(Honduras) Horacio Parham	(substituted on) 79'
DF	11	(Honduras) José Hernández	(substituted on) 89'
Manager:
(Honduras) Wilmer Cruz

GK	1	(Honduras) Kevin Hernández
DF	2	(Honduras) Osman Chávez	(yellow card) 21'
DF	5	(Honduras) Wilfredo Barahona
DF	18	(Honduras) José Velásquez
DF	25	(Honduras) Javier Portillo	(yellow card) 27'
DF	28	(Honduras) César Oseguera
MF	10	(Argentina) Luciano Ursino	(substituted off) 71'
MF	23	(Honduras) Edder Delgado
FW	14	(Honduras) Cristhian Altamirano
FW	19	(Argentina) Domingo Zalazar	(substituted off) 61'
FW	35	(Uruguay) Claudio Cardozo
Substitutions:
FW	59	(Honduras) Román Valencia	(substituted on) 61'
–	–	(Colombia) Jhovany Mina	(substituted on) 71'
–	–
Manager:
(Honduras) Mauro Reyes

== Controversy ==
Juticalpa F.C. and Real C.D. España qualified to the tournament's final after defeating C.D. Real Sociedad and Club Deportivo Olimpia respectively. The final match was scheduled to be played by the end of May. After Juticalpa and Real España were eliminated from the league, both teams decided to postpone the match until July and sent their players on vacations. By the middle of July, both teams had released and acquired new players for the upcoming season. The cup organizers released a statement disclosing that the clubs couldn't use the new signed players as these weren't initially registered at the beginning of the tournament. Consequently, Juticalpa announced that they would not show to the game claiming that they were short on players. A day later, the tournament's committee gave up at the pressure and finally announced that the clubs could use the new signings.
