= 2015–16 Honduran Liga Nacional =

Liga Nacional
- Season: 2015–16
- Champions: Apertura: Honduras Progreso; Clausura: Olimpia
- Relegated: Victoria
- Champions League: Honduras Progreso; Olimpia
- Matches: 200
- Goals: 544 (2.72 per match)
- Top goalscorer: Vega (25)
- Biggest home win: Motagua 7–1 Real España (14 November 2015)
- Biggest away win: Victoria 0–4 Real Sociedad (9 January 2016); Victoria 0–4 Olimpia (27 February 2016)
- Highest scoring: Victoria 4–4 Real España (31 October 2015); Motagua 7–1 Real España (14 November 2015)
- Longest unbeaten run: Real Sociedad (18)
- Longest losing run: Victoria (7)
- All statistics correct as of 22 May 2016.

The 2015–16 Honduran Liga Nacional season was the 50th Honduran Liga Nacional edition, since its establishment in 1965. For this season, the system format remained the same as the previous season. The tournament began on 31 July 2015 and ended on 22 May 2016.

== 2015–16 teams ==
Location of teams in 2015–16 season

A total of 10 teams will contest the tournament, including 9 sides from the 2014–15 season plus Juticalpa F.C., promoted from the 2014–15 Liga de Ascenso.

Team	Location	Stadium	Capacity
Honduras Progreso	El Progreso	Estadio Humberto Micheletti	5,000
Juticalpa	Juticalpa	Estadio Juan Ramón Brevé Vargas	20,000
Marathón	San Pedro Sula	Estadio Yankel Rosenthal	15,000
Motagua	Tegucigalpa	Estadio Tiburcio Carías Andino	35,000
Olimpia	Tegucigalpa	Estadio Tiburcio Carías Andino	35,000
Platense	Puerto Cortés	Estadio Excélsior	7,910
Real España	San Pedro Sula	Estadio Francisco Morazán	26,781
Real Sociedad	Tocoa	Estadio Francisco Martínez Durón	3,000
Victoria	La Ceiba	Estadio Nilmo Edwards	18,000
Vida	La Ceiba	Estadio Nilmo Edwards	18,000

== Managerial changes ==
Team	Outgoing manager	Manner of departure	Vacancy	Replaced by	Appointment	Position in table
Juticalpa	(Honduras) Roger Espinoza	Sacked	7 September 2015	(Honduras) Emilio Umanzor	8 September 2015	7th (Apertura)
Platense	(Uruguay) Ricardo Ortiz	Sacked	8 September 2015	(Honduras) Guillermo Bernárdez	8 September 2015	10th (Apertura)
Vida	(Honduras) Ramón Maradiaga	Resigned	20 September 2015	(Honduras) Elvin López	21 September 2015	4th (Apertura)
Real Sociedad	(Colombia) Horacio Londoño	Resigned	22 September 2015	(Honduras) Mauro Reyes	22 September 2015	5th (Apertura)
Real España	(Argentina) Mario Zanabria	Resigned	3 November 2015	(Uruguay) Miguel Falero	3 November 2015	10th (Apertura)
Victoria	(Honduras) Jorge Pineda	Resigned	19 January 2016	(Colombia) Horacio Londoño	19 January 2016	10th (Clausura)
Juticalpa	(Honduras) Emilio Umanzor	Sacked	1 February 2016	(Honduras) Wilmer Cruz	1 February 2016	8th (Clausura)
Marathón	(Colombia) Jairo Ríos	Sacked	19 February 2016	(Honduras) Carlos Pavón	19 February 2016	4th (Clausura)
Victoria	(Colombia) Horacio Londoño	Resigned	5 April 2016	(Honduras) Jorge Lozano	5 April 2016	10th (Clausura)

== Apertura ==
The Apertura tournament is the first half of the 2015–16 season. It began on 1 August with a 1–0 C.D. Victoria's win over Platense F.C. at Estadio Nilmo Edwards. Juticalpa F.C.'s first ever Liga Nacional game occurred on 9 August with great success for the debs as they managed to beat Real C.D. España with a 2–0 score. This game also served as the first ever official game at recently opened stadium Juan Ramón Brevé Vargas. On 30 August, C.D.S. Vida defeated Club Deportivo Olimpia with a 2–3 away score for the first time after 21 years at Estadio Tiburcio Carías Andino. That Olimpia's defeat represented their first time losing three consecutive games playing in Tegucigalpa since 2001 and their worst season start ever with a 1–0–4 record at the moment. On 7 September, Juticalpa's Roger Espinoza became the first coach to be sacked due to poor results. On 12 September, Vida's defender Elder Torres broke an all-time record against C.D. Motagua for being sent off after only 8 seconds of kickoff in a match played at Tegucigalpa. That same night, Olimpia's coach Héctor Vargas reached his 400 game as a manager in the Honduran Liga Nacional since his debut in 1998. On 26 September, manager Ramón Maradiaga coached his last game with Vida leading his team in a 2–0 victory over C.D. Real Sociedad as he was hired by the El Salvador national football team on their quest to the 2018 FIFA World Cup. On 4 October, Malian defender Mamadou Traoré became the first African player to score a goal in the history of the league in the Platense's 2–1 win over Vida. On 7 October, Marathón's president Yankel Rosenthal was arrested in Miami after the United States Department of Justice released a statement saying that he, as well as his uncle Jaime Rosenthal and cousin Yani Rosenthal were labeled "specially designated narcotics traffickers" under the Kingpin Act. On 6 November, C.D. Honduras Progreso clinched their first ever regular season title after defeating 1–0 Marathón at Estadio Humberto Micheletti. On 14 November, Motagua defeated Real España 7–1 at Tegucigalpa setting a record as the largest victory against them; representing also, the worst regular season finish for Real España with only 15 points of 54 possible (27.78%). On 10 December, international midfielder and Olimpia player Arnold Peralta was shot dead by a gunman in La Ceiba, five days after playing his last game in the semifinals. On 19 December, Honduras Progreso lifted their first league title after defeating Motagua on penalty shootouts after a 4–4 aggregate.

=== Regular season ===
==== Standings ====
Pos	Team	Pld	W	D	L	GF	GA	GD	Pts	Qualification or relegation
1	Honduras Progreso	18	11	3	4	31	21	+10	36	Qualification to the Semifinals
2	Motagua	18	9	5	4	41	25	+16	32	Qualification to the Semifinals
3	Olimpia	18	8	2	8	32	25	+7	26	Qualification to the Second round
4	Vida	18	7	5	6	19	24	−5	26	Qualification to the Second round
5	Marathón	18	6	6	6	19	20	−1	24	Qualification to the Second round
6	Real Sociedad	18	6	5	7	26	22	+4	23	Qualification to the Second round
7	Platense	18	5	7	6	20	20	0	22	
8	Juticalpa	18	6	4	8	19	22	−3	22	
9	Victoria	18	4	7	7	20	35	−15	19	
10	Real España	18	3	6	9	26	39	−13	15	

Updated to match(es) played on 19 November 2015. Source:

==== Results ====
As of 19 November 2015

Home \ Away	HON	JUT	MAR	MOT	OLI	PLA	RES	RSO	VIC	VID
Honduras Progreso		1–0	1–0	4–1	4–1	4–3	4–2	2–1	1–1	1–1
Juticalpa	0–1		2–0	1–2	0–1	3–1	2–0	0–1	2–1	0–3
Marathón	1–2	1–1		2–1	1–0	0–0	2–0	0–3	2–0	5–2
Motagua	3–0	2–2	2–0		1–0	2–1	7–1	2–4	5–1	5–0
Olimpia	2–1	2–2	4–1	1–2		0–1	1–2	2–0	6–0	2–3
Platense	1–1	2–0	0–0	1–1	4–2		1–0	1–1	1–1	2–1
Real España	1–2	2–0	1–3	2–2	1–2	1–1		1–1	4–2	0–1
Real Sociedad	0–1	0–1	1–1	3–1	1–2	1–0	3–3		1–1	4–0
Victoria	1–0	1–1	0–0	2–2	1–4	1–0	4–4	2–1		1–0
Vida	2–1	1–2	0–0	0–0	0–0	1–0	1–1	2–0	1–0	

Source: Soccerway
Legend: Blue = home team win; Yellow = draw; Red = away team win.

=== Postseason ===
==== Playoffs ====
3rd seeded	Agg.	6th seeded	1st leg	2nd leg
Olimpia	5–4	Real Sociedad	2–2	3–2
4th seeded	Agg.	5th seeded	1st leg	2nd leg
Vida	0–0	Marathón	0–0	0–0

Match details
22 November 2015
13:30 (UTC−06:00)
1st leg

Real Sociedad	2–2	Olimpia
Abbott 50'; Tobías 75' (pen.)	Report	67' Alvarado; 79' Fonseca

Estadio Francisco Martínez Durón
Tocoa, Colón
Attendance: 2,030
Referee: Melvin Matamoros

Real Sociedad	Olimpia

GK	27	(Honduras) Francisco Reyes
DF	3	(Honduras) Robbie Matute
DF	5	(Honduras) Hilder Colón
DF	18	(Honduras) Henry Clark	(substituted off) 85'
DF	19	(Honduras) José Tobías
DF	–	(Honduras) Jonathan Paz	(yellow card) 46'
MF	15	(Honduras) Enuar Salgado	(substituted off) 36'
FW	7	(Honduras) Marco Vega
FW	11	(Honduras) Rony Martínez	(substituted off) 70'
FW	24	(Honduras) Christian Altamirano
–	22	(Honduras) Kemsie Abbott
Substitutions:
DF	6	(Honduras) José Barralaga	(substituted on) 36'	(yellow card) 85'
MF	10	(Honduras) César Zelaya	(substituted on) 70'
–	21	(Honduras) David Carranza	(substituted on) 85'
Manager:
(Honduras) Mauro Reyes

GK	28	(Honduras) Donis Escober
DF	4	(Brazil) Fábio de Souza
DF	5	(Honduras) Ever Alvarado
DF	14	(Honduras) José Fonseca
DF	36	(Honduras) Kevin Álvarez
MF	7	(Honduras) Carlos Mejía
MF	10	(Honduras) Bayron Méndez	(yellow card) 48'	(substituted off) 66'
MF	20	(Honduras) Óliver Morazán
MF	26	(Honduras) Óscar Salas	(substituted off) 65'
FW	17	(Honduras) Alberth Elis	(yellow card) 75'
FW	31	(Honduras) Romell Quioto	(yellow card) 55'	(substituted off) 86'
Substitutions:
DF	12	(Honduras) Bryan Johnson	(substituted on) 65'
FW	33	(Honduras) Michaell Chirinos	(substituted on) 66'
FW	21	(Honduras) Roger Rojas	(substituted on) 86'
Manager:
(Argentina) Héctor Vargas

25 November 2015
19:00 (UTC−06:00)
2nd leg

Olimpia	3–2	Real Sociedad
Quioto 8'; Méndez (penalty missed); Elis 48'; Mejía 90+1'	Report	28' Tobías; 45' Vega

Estadio Tiburcio Carías Andino
Tegucigalpa, Francisco Morazán
Attendance: 6,656
Referee: Raúl Castro

Olimpia	Real Sociedad

GK	27	(Honduras) Noel Valladares
DF	4	(Brazil) Fábio de Souza
DF	5	(Honduras) Ever Alvarado
DF	30	(Honduras) Johnny Palacios
MF	7	(Honduras) Carlos Mejía	(yellow card) 45'	(substituted off) 69'
MF	8	(Honduras) Arnold Peralta	(yellow card) 51'
MF	10	(Honduras) Bayron Méndez	(substituted off) 66'
MF	20	(Honduras) Óliver Morazán
MF	26	(Honduras) Óscar Salas	(substituted off) 85'
FW	17	(Honduras) Alberth Elis
FW	31	(Honduras) Romell Quioto
Substitutions:
MF	29	(Honduras) German Mejía	(substituted on) 63'
FW	33	(Honduras) Michaell Chirinos	(substituted on) 69'
DF	36	(Honduras) Kevin Álvarez	(substituted on) 85'
Manager:
(Argentina) Héctor Vargas

GK	27	(Honduras) Francisco Reyes
DF	3	(Honduras) Robbie Matute	(yellow card) 68'
DF	5	(Honduras) Hilder Colón	(yellow card) 78'
DF	6	(Honduras) José Barralaga	(yellow card) 44'	(substituted off) 68'
DF	17	(Honduras) Osman Melgares
DF	18	(Honduras) Henry Clark
DF	19	(Honduras) José Tobías
DF	–	(Honduras) Jonathan Paz	(yellow card) 55'
FW	7	(Honduras) Marco Vega	(substituted off) 88'
FW	24	(Honduras) Christian Altamirano	(substituted off) 79'
–	22	(Honduras) Kemsie Abbott
Substitutions:
FW	11	(Honduras) Rony Martínez	(substituted on) 68'
MF	10	(Honduras) César Zelaya	(substituted on) 79'
–	21	(Honduras) David Carranza	(substituted on) 88'
Manager:
(Honduras) Mauro Reyes

22 November 2015
15:00 (UTC−06:00)
1st leg

Marathón	0–0	Vida
	Report

Estadio Yankel Rosenthal
San Pedro Sula, Cortés
Attendance: 3,179
Referee: Miguel Torres

Marathón	Vida

GK	31	(Honduras) José Zúniga
DF	2	(Honduras) Luis Palacios
DF	4	(Honduras) Bryan Castro	(yellow card) 44'
DF	5	(Honduras) Carlos Palacios
MF	6	(Honduras) Jairo Puerto	(substituted off) 72'
MF	16	(Honduras) Allan Banegas
MF	17	(Honduras) Wilmer Fuentes	(substituted off) 46'
MF	46	(Honduras) John Suazo
FW	8	(Honduras) Walter Martínez
FW	11	(Honduras) Diego Reyes
FW	18	(Honduras) Darvis Argueta	(substituted off) 46'
Substitutions:
FW	–	(Honduras) Georgie Welcome	(substituted on) 46'
DF	19	(Honduras) Mario Berríos	(substituted on) 46'
FW	29	(Honduras) Joseph Cunningham	(substituted on) 72'
Manager:
(Colombia) Jairo Ríos

GK	18	(Honduras) Orlin Vallecillo	(yellow card) 80'
DF	6	(Honduras) Secundino Martínez
DF	16	(Honduras) Brayan García	(substituted off) 65'
DF	23	(Honduras) Chestyn Onofre
DF	33	(Argentina) Leonardo Domínguez
MF	2	(Honduras) José Arévalo	(yellow card) 66'
MF	8	(Honduras) Jesús Canales
MF	20	(Honduras) Rodolfo Espinal	(yellow card) 40'
MF	22	(Honduras) Miguel Valerio
FW	9	(Honduras) Franco Güity	(substituted off) 75'
–	11	(Honduras) Brayan Moya	(substituted off) 46'
Substitutions:
MF	12	(Honduras) Raúl Santos	(substituted on) 46'
FW	7	(Honduras) Cholby Martínez	(substituted on) 65'
MF	3	(Honduras) Nolberto García	(substituted on) 75'
Manager:
(Honduras) Elvin López

25 November 2015
19:00 (UTC−06:00)
2nd leg

Vida	0–0	Marathón
	Report

Estadio Nilmo Edwards
La Ceiba, Atlántida
Attendance: 4,614
Referee: Héctor Rodríguez

Vida	Marathón

GK	1	(Honduras) Ricardo Canales	(yellow card) 58'
DF	6	(Honduras) Secundino Martínez
DF	23	(Honduras) Chestyn Onofre
DF	33	(Argentina) Leonardo Domínguez
MF	2	(Honduras) José Arévalo
MF	8	(Honduras) Jesús Canales
MF	12	(Honduras) Raúl Santos	(substituted off) 68'
MF	20	(Honduras) Rodolfo Espinal
MF	22	(Honduras) Miguel Valerio
FW	7	(Honduras) Cholby Martínez	(substituted off) 60'
–	11	(Honduras) Brayan Moya	(yellow card) 33'	(substituted off) 46'
Substitutions:
MF	10	(Honduras) Maycol Montero	(substituted on) 46'
DF	4	(Honduras) Sonny Fernández	(substituted on) 60'
DF	16	(Honduras) Brayan García	(substituted on) 68'
Manager:
(Honduras) Elvin López

GK	31	(Honduras) José Zúniga
DF	2	(Honduras) Luis Palacios	(substituted off) 52'
DF	5	(Honduras) Carlos Palacios
DF	19	(Honduras) Mario Berríos
DF	21	(Honduras) Daniel Tejeda
MF	6	(Honduras) Jairo Puerto	(substituted off) 66'
MF	17	(Honduras) Wilmer Fuentes
MF	46	(Honduras) John Suazo
FW	8	(Honduras) Walter Martínez
FW	11	(Honduras) Diego Reyes	(yellow card) 33'
FW	–	(Honduras) Georgie Welcome	(yellow card) 68'
Substitutions:
FW	29	(Honduras) Joseph Cunningham	(substituted on) 52'	(yellow card) 85'
FW	18	(Honduras) Darvis Argueta	(substituted on) 66'
–	–	–
Manager:
(Colombia) Jairo Ríos

==== Semifinals ====
1st seeded	Agg.	4th seeded	1st leg	2nd leg
Honduras Progreso	1–0	Vida	0–0	1–0
2nd seeded	Agg.	3rd seeded	1st leg	2nd leg
Motagua	2–2	Olimpia	1–1	1–1

Match details
28 November 2015
19:00 (UTC−06:00)
1st leg

Vida	0–0	Honduras Progreso
	Report

Estadio Nilmo Edwards
La Ceiba, Atlántida
Attendance: 4,886
Referee: Saíd Martínez

Vida	Honduras

GK	18	(Honduras) Orlin Vallecillo
DF	6	(Honduras) Secundino Martínez
DF	23	(Honduras) Chestyn Onofre
DF	33	(Argentina) Leonardo Domínguez
MF	2	(Honduras) José Arévalo	(substituted off) 65'
MF	8	(Honduras) Jesús Canales
MF	13	(Honduras) Elder Torres
MF	20	(Honduras) Rodolfo Espinal
MF	22	(Honduras) Miguel Valerio	(yellow card) 56'
FW	7	(Honduras) Cholby Martínez	(red card) 76'
FW	11	(Honduras) Brayan Velásquez	(yellow card) 70'	(substituted off) 80'
Substitutions:
MF	10	(Honduras) Maycol Montero	(substituted on) 65'
MF	12	(Honduras) Raúl Santos	(substituted on) 80'
–	–
Manager:
(Honduras) Elvin López

GK	27	(Belize) Woodrow West
DF	1	(Honduras) Pastor Martínez
DF	3	(Honduras) Jorge Zaldívar
DF	17	(Honduras) Dílmer Gutiérrez
DF	31	(Honduras) Carlos Sánchez
MF	6	(Honduras) Juan Delgado
MF	12	(Honduras) Mariano Acevedo	(yellow card) 88'
MF	15	(Honduras) Franklyn Morales	(yellow card) 66'
FW	10	(Honduras) Edwin León	(substituted off) 55'
FW	13	(Honduras) Ángel Tejeda
FW	23	(Honduras) Pedro Mencía	(substituted off) 75'
Substitutions:
MF	8	(Honduras) Jorge Cardona	(substituted on) 55'
FW	19	(Honduras) Aly Arriola	(substituted on) 75'
–	–
Manager:
(Honduras) Héctor Castellón

6 December 2015
15:00 (UTC−06:00)
2nd leg

Honduras Progreso	1–0	Vida
León 88'	Report

Estadio Humberto Micheletti
El Progreso, Yoro
Attendance: 2,280
Referee: Miguel Torres

Honduras	Vida

GK	27	(Belize) Woodrow West
DF	1	(Honduras) Pastor Martínez
DF	3	(Honduras) Jorge Zaldívar	(substituted off) 71'
DF	17	(Honduras) Dilmer Gutiérrez
DF	31	(Honduras) Carlos Sánchez
MF	6	(Honduras) Juan Delgado
MF	12	(Honduras) Mariano Acevedo
MF	15	(Honduras) Franklyn Morales	(yellow card) 50'
FW	10	(Honduras) Edwin León	(substituted off) 90+1'
FW	13	(Honduras) Ángel Tejeda
FW	23	(Honduras) Pedro Mencía	(substituted off) 70'
Substitutions:
MF	8	(Honduras) Jorge Cardona	(substituted on) 70'
MF	7	(Honduras) Luis Alvarado	(substituted on) 71'
DF	4	(Honduras) Dederick Cálix	(substituted on) 90+1'
Manager:
(Honduras) Héctor Castellón

GK	1	(Honduras) Ricardo Canales
DF	6	(Honduras) Secundino Martínez
DF	16	(Honduras) Brayan García	(substituted off) 67'
DF	23	(Honduras) Chestyn Onofre
DF	33	(Argentina) Leonardo Domínguez
MF	2	(Honduras) José Arévalo
MF	8	(Honduras) Jesús Canales	(substituted off) 84'
MF	12	(Honduras) Raúl Santos	(yellow card) 50'
MF	20	(Honduras) Rodolfo Espinal
MF	22	(Honduras) Miguel Valerio	(yellow card) 36'
FW	11	(Honduras) Brayan Velásquez	(substituted off) 69'
Substitutions:
FW	14	(Honduras) Darián Álvarez	(substituted on) 67'
MF	32	(Honduras) Marvin Bernárdez	(substituted on) 69'	(yellow card) 80'
DF	4	(Honduras) Sonny Fernández	(substituted on) 84'
Manager:
(Honduras) Elvin López

29 November 2015
18:00 (UTC−06:00)
1st leg

Olimpia	1–1	Motagua
Méndez 22'	Report	35' Hernández

Estadio Tiburcio Carías Andino
Tegucigalpa, Francisco Morazán
Attendance: 12,087
Referee: Geovanny Mendoza

Olimpia	Motagua

GK	28	(Honduras) Donis Escober
DF	4	(Brazil) Fábio de Souza
DF	5	(Honduras) Ever Alvarado	(yellow card) 16'
DF	30	(Honduras) Johnny Palacios
DF	36	(Honduras) Kevin Álvarez
MF	7	(Honduras) Carlos Mejía	(substituted off) 60'
MF	8	(Honduras) Arnold Peralta	(yellow card) 40'	(substituted off) 46'
MF	10	(Honduras) Bayron Méndez
MF	20	(Honduras) Óliver Morazán
FW	17	(Honduras) Alberth Elis
FW	31	(Honduras) Romell Quioto	(substituted off) 81'
Substitutions:
MF	–	(Honduras) Mayron Flores	(substituted on) 46'
FW	33	(Honduras) Michaell Chirinos	(substituted on) 60'
FW	21	(Honduras) Roger Rojas	(substituted on) 81'
Manager:
(Argentina) Héctor Vargas

GK	25	(Honduras) Marlon Licona
DF	2	(Honduras) Juan Montes
DF	3	(Honduras) Henry Figueroa
DF	4	(Honduras) Júnior Izaguirre
DF	24	(Honduras) Omar Elvir
DF	27	(Honduras) Félix Crisanto	(substituted off) 7'
MF	6	(Honduras) Reinieri Mayorquín
MF	22	(Argentina) Santiago Vergara
FW	7	(Honduras) Erick Andino	(substituted off) 73'
FW	14	(Honduras) Irving Reyna	(yellow card) 21'	(substituted off) 82'
FW	30	(Honduras) Eddie Hernández	(yellow card) 60'
Substitutions:
DF	18	(Honduras) Wilmer Crisanto	(substituted on) 7'
FW	34	(Honduras) Kevin López	(substituted on) 73'
MF	16	(Honduras) Héctor Castellón	(substituted on) 82'
Manager:
(Argentina) Diego Vásquez

5 December 2015
19:00 (UTC−06:00)
2nd leg

Motagua	1–1	Olimpia
López 84'	Report	21' Quioto

Estadio Tiburcio Carías Andino
Tegucigalpa, Francisco Morazán
Attendance: 15,058
Referee: Armando Castro

Motagua	Olimpia

GK	25	(Honduras) Marlon Licona
DF	2	(Honduras) Juan Montes
DF	3	(Honduras) Henry Figueroa	Red card
DF	4	(Honduras) Júnior Izaguirre	(yellow card) 18'	(substituted off) 75'
DF	18	(Honduras) Wilmer Crisanto	(yellow card) 78'
DF	24	(Honduras) Omar Elvir
MF	6	(Honduras) Reinieri Mayorquín	(yellow card) 36'	(substituted off) 84'
MF	22	(Argentina) Santiago Vergara	(yellow card) 4'
FW	7	(Honduras) Erick Andino	(substituted off) 59'
FW	14	(Honduras) Irvin Reyna
FW	30	(Honduras) Eddie Hernández
Substitutions:
FW	10	(Brazil) Israel Silva	(substituted on) 59'
FW	34	(Honduras) Kevin López	(substituted on) 75'
DF	8	(Honduras) Orlin Peralta	(substituted on) 84'
Manager:
(Argentina) Diego Vásquez

GK	27	(Honduras) Noel Valladares
DF	4	(Brazil) Fábio de Souza
DF	5	(Honduras) Ever Alvarado
DF	12	(Honduras) Bryan Johnson	(yellow card) 51'
DF	30	(Honduras) Johnny Palacios	Red card
MF	8	(Honduras) Arnold Peralta	(yellow card) 27'
MF	10	(Honduras) Bayron Méndez
MF	–	(Honduras) Mayron Flores	(yellow card) 61'	(substituted off) 65'
MF	26	(Honduras) Óscar Salas
FW	17	(Honduras) Alberth Elis
FW	31	(Honduras) Romell Quioto	(yellow card) 60'	(substituted off) 72'
Substitutions:
MF	20	(Honduras) Óliver Morazán	(substituted on) 65'
FW	33	(Honduras) Michaell Chirinos	(substituted on) 72'	(substituted off) 76'
DF	36	(Honduras) Kevin Álvarez	(substituted on) 76'
Manager:
(Argentina) Héctor Vargas

==== Final ====
1st seeded	Agg.	2nd seeded	1st leg	2nd leg
Honduras Progreso	4–4	Motagua	3–3	1–1

Match details
12 December 2015
19:30 (UTC−06:00)
1st leg

Motagua	3–3	Honduras Progreso
Hernández 8' 27'; Silva 45'	Report	4' 54' Elvir; 38' Morales

Estadio Tiburcio Carías Andino
Tegucigalpa, Francisco Morazán
Attendance: 16,528
Referee: Saíd Martínez

Motagua	Honduras

GK	25	(Honduras) Marlon Licona
DF	2	(Honduras) Juan Montes
DF	4	(Honduras) Júnior Izaguirre	(substituted off) 61'
DF	5	(Honduras) Marcelo Pereira
DF	18	(Honduras) Wilmer Crisanto	(yellow card) 29'
DF	24	(Honduras) Omar Elvir
MF	16	(Honduras) Héctor Castellanos
MF	22	(Argentina) Santiago Vergara
FW	10	(Brazil) Israel Silva	(yellow card) 45'	(substituted off) 63'
FW	14	(Honduras) Irvin Reyna	(substituted off) 70'
FW	30	(Honduras) Eddie Hernández	(yellow card) 28'
Substitutions:
FW	34	(Honduras) Kevin López	(substituted on) 61'
FW	7	(Honduras) Erick Andino	(substituted on) 63'
FW	11	(Argentina) Lucas Gómez	(substituted on) 70'
Manager:
(Argentina) Diego Vásquez

GK	27	(Belize) Woodrow West	(yellow card) 65'
DF	1	(Honduras) Pastor Martínez
DF	3	(Honduras) Jorge Zaldívar	(substituted off) 46'
DF	4	(Honduras) Dederick Cálix
DF	17	(Honduras) Dilmer Gutiérrez	(yellow card) 21'
DF	31	(Honduras) Carlos Sánchez
MF	6	(Honduras) Juan Delgado	Red card
MF	12	(Honduras) Mariano Acevedo	(yellow card) 87'
MF	15	(Honduras) Franklyn Morales	(substituted off) 74'
FW	13	(Honduras) Ángel Tejeda
FW	35	(Honduras) Frédixon Elvir	(substituted off) 70'
Substitutions:
MF	7	(Honduras) Luis Alvarado	(substituted on) 46'
MF	20	(Honduras) Leonardo Isaula	(substituted on) 70'
MF	16	(Honduras) Johny Gómez	(substituted on) 74'
Manager:
(Honduras) Héctor Castellón

19 December 2015
19:15 (UTC−06:00)
2nd leg

Honduras Progreso	1–1	Motagua
Figueroa 32' (o.g.)	Report	6' López
Penalties
Arriola (penalty scored); Alvarado (penalty scored); Sánchez (penalty scored); Acevedo (penalty scored)	4–1	(penalty missed) Andino; (penalty missed) Vergara; (penalty scored) Crisanto

Estadio Humberto Micheletti
El Progreso, Yoro
Attendance: 6,000
Referee: Armando Castro

Honduras	Motagua

GK	27	(Belize) Woodrow West
DF	1	(Honduras) Pastor Martínez	(substituted off) 117'
DF	3	(Honduras) Jorge Zaldívar
DF	17	(Honduras) Dilmer Gutiérrez
DF	31	(Honduras) Carlos Sánchez
MF	12	(Honduras) Mariano Acevedo
MF	15	(Honduras) Franklyn Morales
MF	20	(Honduras) Leonardo Isaula	(substituted off) 90'
FW	10	(Honduras) Edwin León
FW	13	(Honduras) Ángel Tejeda
FW	35	(Honduras) Frédixon Elvir	(substituted off) 72'
Substitutions:
MF	8	(Honduras) Jorge Cardona	(substituted on) 72'
FW	19	(Honduras) Aly Arriola	(substituted on) 90'
MF	7	(Honduras) Luis Alvarado	(substituted on) 117'
Manager:
(Honduras) Héctor Castellón

GK	25	(Honduras) Marlon Licona
DF	2	(Honduras) Juan Montes	(substituted off) 58'
DF	3	(Honduras) Henry Figueroa
DF	4	(Honduras) Júnior Izaguirre
DF	24	(Honduras) Omar Elvir
MF	6	(Honduras) Reinieri Mayorquín	(substituted off) 90'
MF	22	(Argentina) Santiago Vergara
FW	10	(Brazil) Israel Silva	(substituted off) 54'
FW	14	(Honduras) Irvin Reyna
FW	30	(Honduras) Eddie Hernández	Red card
FW	34	(Honduras) Kevin López
Substitutions:
FW	7	(Honduras) Erick Andino	(substituted on) 54'
DF	18	(Honduras) Wilmer Crisanto	(substituted on) 58'
MF	16	(Honduras) Héctor Castellanos	(substituted on) 90'
Manager:
(Argentina) Diego Vásquez

== Clausura ==
The Clausura tournament is the second half of the 2015–16 season. The tournament started on 9 January 2016 at Estadio Yankel Rosenthal in the 1–2 C.D. Honduras Progreso's away victory over C.D. Marathón. This Honduras Progreso's win marks their fourth consecutive victory playing in their season's inaugural game, a flawless record since their promotion in 2014. For their second year in a row, Club Deportivo Olimpia launched an exclusive yellow jersey which will be used in the month of February to show their support to the fight against Childhood cancer. On 16 February, all-time C.D.S. Vida's top scorer Carlos Alvarado died at the age of 65. On the night of 6 April, there were two records accomplished by two players; Javier Portillo became the player with the most red cards in the league with 14 in total. Meanwhile, Leonardo Isaula played its 502nd match in the history of the league, breaking the previous mark left by Rony Morales who had 501 appearances. On 10 April, C.D. Victoria consummated their relegation to Liga de Ascenso after Real C.D. España defeated Marathón on week 14; it was the first relegation for Victoria since 2003. The season ended on 22 May 2016 as Olimpia conquered its 30th national title after defeating C.D. Real Sociedad in the finals with a 5–2 aggregated score.

=== Regular season ===
==== Standings ====
Pos	Team	Pld	W	D	L	GF	GA	GD	Pts	Qualification or relegation
1	Olimpia	18	11	4	3	37	13	+24	37	Qualification to the Semifinals
2	Real Sociedad	18	10	7	1	35	15	+20	37	Qualification to the Semifinals
3	Real España	18	9	5	4	29	19	+10	32	Qualification to the Second round
4	Motagua	18	9	3	6	28	22	+6	30	Qualification to the Second round
5	Juticalpa	18	8	4	6	25	22	+3	28	Qualification to the Second round
6	Marathón	18	7	4	7	25	20	+5	25	Qualification to the Second round
7	Vida	18	4	7	7	18	24	−6	19	
8	Honduras Progreso	18	3	6	9	21	30	−9	15	
9	Platense	18	3	6	9	18	34	−16	15	
10	Victoria	18	1	4	13	10	47	−37	7	

Updated to match(es) played on 1 May 2016. Source:

==== Results ====
As of 1 May 2016

Home \ Away	HON	JUT	MAR	MOT	OLI	PLA	RES	RSO	VIC	VID
Honduras Progreso		1–1	0–0	1–2	0–2	1–1	2–4	1–1	1–1	3–2
Juticalpa	2–1		1–3	4–2	2–1	2–0	1–1	1–2	2–1	1–1
Marathón	1–2	2–0		3–1	0–1	1–1	1–2	0–3	3–0	1–0
Motagua	2–1	2–0	2–1		1–4	2–0	0–0	3–3	4–0	1–1
Olimpia	2–2	0–1	0–0	1–0		3–0	3–1	1–1	5–0	4–0
Platense	2–1	0–2	2–3	0–2	1–2		2–1	1–1	2–3	1–0
Real España	1–0	1–0	1–0	1–0	2–3	6–1		2–2	3–1	1–0
Real Sociedad	3–0	2–0	2–1	2–0	0–0	2–2	1–0		2–0	3–1
Victoria	1–4	0–3	0–3	0–2	0–3	2–2	1–1	0–4		0–2
Vida	2–0	2–2	2–2	0–2	2–1	0–0	1–1	2–1	0–0	

Source: Soccerway
Legend: Blue = home team win; Yellow = draw; Red = away team win.

=== Postseason ===
==== Playoffs ====
3rd seeded	Agg.	6th seeded	1st leg	2nd leg
Real España	2–1	Marathón	0–1	2–0
4th seeded	Agg.	5th seeded	1st leg	2nd leg
Motagua	3–1	Juticalpa	0–1	3–0

Match details
5 May 2016
15:30 (UTC−06:00)
1st leg

Marathón	1–0	Real España
Moreira 41'	Report

Estadio Yankel Rosenthal
San Pedro Sula, Cortés
Attendance: 1,655
Referee: Raúl Castro

Marathón	Real España

GK	25	(Honduras) Dénovan Torres
DF	3	(Honduras) Samuel Córdova	(yellow card) 53'
DF	5	(Honduras) Carlos Palacios	(yellow card) 47'
DF	12	(Honduras) José Perdomo	(yellow card) 18'
MF	6	(Honduras) Jairo Puerto
MF	16	(Honduras) Allan Banegas
MF	17	(Honduras) Wilmer Fuentes	(yellow card) 6'
FW	7	(Colombia) William Zapata	(substituted off) 71'
FW	8	(Honduras) Walter Martínez	(substituted off) 83'
FW	9	(Brazil) Josimar Moreira	(substituted off) 90+1'
FW	24	(Colombia) Éder Munive
Substitutions:
FW	11	(Honduras) Diego Reyes	(substituted on) 71'
FW	28	(Honduras) Carlos Valentín	(substituted on) 83'	(yellow card) 86'
MF	46	(Honduras) John Suazo	(substituted on) 90+1'
Manager:
(Honduras) Carlos Pavón

GK	22	(Honduras) Luis López
DF	2	(Honduras) Osman Chávez
DF	7	(Honduras) Odis Borjas
DF	18	(Honduras) José Velásquez	(substituted off) 84'
DF	25	(Honduras) Javier Portillo	(red card) 33'
DF	28	(Honduras) César Oseguera
MF	6	(Honduras) Bryan Acosta
MF	19	(Honduras) Iván López	(substituted off) 90+1'
MF	23	(Honduras) Edder Delgado	(yellow card) 75'
MF	38	(Honduras) Jhow Benavídez
FW	35	(Uruguay) Claudio Cardozo	(substituted off) 46'
Substitutions:
MF	20	(Honduras) José Arévalo	(substituted on) 46'	(yellow card) 64'
MF	12	(Honduras) Gerson Rodas	(substituted on) 84'
FW	11	(Uruguay) Cristhian Gutiérrez	(substituted on) 90+1'
Manager:
(Uruguay) Miguel Falero

8 May 2016
19:00 (UTC−06:00)
2nd leg

Real España	2–0	Marathón
Cardozo 6' (pen.); Acosta 9'	Report

Estadio Francisco Morazán
San Pedro Sula, Cortés
Attendance: 5,464
Referee: Saíd Martínez

Real España	Marathón

GK	22	(Honduras) Luis López
DF	2	(Honduras) Osman Chávez
DF	7	(Honduras) Odis Borjas	(yellow card) 57'
DF	28	(Honduras) César Oseguera
DF	29	(Honduras) Allans Vargas
MF	6	(Honduras) Bryan Acosta
MF	17	(Uruguay) Bruno Foliados	(yellow card) 34'	(substituted off) 75'
MF	19	(Honduras) Iván López	(substituted off) 87'
MF	23	(Honduras) Edder Delgado
MF	38	(Honduras) Jhow Benavídez
FW	35	(Uruguay) Claudio Cardozo	(yellow card) 12'	(substituted off) 46'
Substitutions:
FW	36	(Honduras) Rudy Meléndrez	(substituted on) 46'	(yellow card) 74'
MF	12	(Honduras) Gerson Rodas	(substituted on) 75'
FW	11	(Uruguay) Cristhian Gutiérrez	(substituted on) 87'
Manager:
(Uruguay) Miguel Falero

GK	25	(Honduras) Dénovan Torres
DF	3	(Honduras) Samuel Córdova
DF	5	(Honduras) Carlos Palacios
DF	12	(Honduras) José Perdomo	(yellow card) 55'
MF	6	(Honduras) Jairo Puerto
MF	16	(Honduras) Allan Banegas	(substituted off) 80'
MF	17	(Honduras) Wilmer Fuentes	(yellow card) 90+1'
FW	7	(Colombia) William Zapata	(substituted off) 56'
FW	8	(Honduras) Walter Martínez	(yellow card) 18'
FW	9	(Brazil) Josimar Moreira
FW	24	(Colombia) Éder Munive	(yellow card) 27'
Substitutions:
FW	11	(Honduras) Diego Reyes	(substituted on) 56'	(substituted off) 66'
MF	20	(Honduras) Joshua Vargas	(substituted on) 66'	(yellow card) 71'
DF	19	(Honduras) Mario Berríos	(substituted on) 80'
Manager:
(Honduras) Carlos Pavón

5 May 2016
18:00 (UTC−06:00)
1st leg

Juticalpa	1–0	Motagua
Ramírez 10'	Report

Estadio Juan Ramón Brevé Vargas
Juticalpa, Olancho
Attendance: 4,300
Referee: Armando Castro

Juticalpa	Motagua

GK	29	(Honduras) Harold Fonseca
DF	2	(Honduras) Marlon Peña
DF	14	(Honduras) Orvin Paz	(yellow card) 67'
DF	19	(Honduras) Sergio Mendoza
MF	3	(Honduras) Erick Peña
MF	8	(Honduras) Aldo Oviedo
MF	10	(Honduras) Carlos Lanza	(substituted off) 81'
MF	23	(Honduras) Randy Diamond	(substituted off) 56'
MF	30	(Honduras) José Williams
FW	17	(Honduras) Brayan Ramírez
FW	21	(Honduras) Rony Flores
Substitutions:
MF	7	(Honduras) Juan Ocampo	(substituted on) 56'
FW	9	(Brazil) Douglas Caetano	(substituted on) 81'
Manager:
(Honduras) Wilmer Cruz

GK	25	(Honduras) Marlon Licona
DF	2	(Honduras) Juan Montes
DF	3	(Honduras) Henry Figueroa
DF	5	(Honduras) Marcelo Pereira	(yellow card) 75'
DF	8	(Honduras) Orlin Peralta	(substituted off) 46'
DF	18	(Honduras) Wilmer Crisanto
MF	16	(Honduras) Héctor Castellanos
MF	22	(Argentina) Santiago Vergara	(substituted off) 75'
MF	27	(Honduras) Félix Crisanto	(yellow card) 60'
FW	10	(Brazil) Israel Silva
FW	11	(Argentina) Lucas Gómez	(substituted off) 68'
Substitutions:
FW	14	(Honduras) Irvin Reyna	(substituted on) 46'	(yellow card) 90+1'
FW	7	(Honduras) Erick Andino	(substituted on) 68'
DF	24	(Honduras) Omar Elvir	(substituted on) 75'
Manager:
(Argentina) Diego Vásquez

8 May 2016
16:00 (UTC−06:00)
2nd leg

Motagua	3–0	Juticalpa
Vergara 10'; Gómez 17'; Andino 82'	Report

Estadio Tiburcio Carías Andino
Tegucigalpa, Francisco Morazán
Attendance: 5,187
Referee: Geovanny Mendoza

Motagua	Juticalpa

GK	1	(Argentina) Sebastián Portigliatti
DF	2	(Honduras) Juan Montes
DF	3	(Honduras) Henry Figueroa
DF	4	(Honduras) Júnior Izaguirre
DF	18	(Honduras) Wilmer Crisanto
DF	24	(Honduras) Omar Elvir	(substituted off) 71'
MF	6	(Honduras) Reinieri Mayorquín	(substituted off) 68'
MF	22	(Argentina) Santiago Vergara
FW	10	(Brazil) Israel Silva	(substituted off) 61'
FW	11	(Argentina) Lucas Gómez	(yellow card) 31'
FW	14	(Honduras) Irvin Reyna
Substitutions:
FW	7	(Honduras) Erick Andino	(substituted on) 61'
MF	16	(Honduras) Héctor Castellanos	(substituted on) 68'
DF	27	(Honduras) Félix Crisanto	(substituted on) 71'
Manager:
(Argentina) Diego Vásquez

GK	29	(Honduras) Harold Fonseca
DF	2	(Honduras) Marlon Peña
DF	14	(Honduras) Orvin Paz	(substituted off) 56'
DF	19	(Honduras) Sergio Mendoza
MF	3	(Honduras) Erick Peña	(substituted off) 69'
MF	8	(Honduras) Aldo Oviedo
MF	30	(Honduras) José Williams
FW	9	(Brazil) Douglas Caetano	(substituted off) 56'
FW	17	(Honduras) Brayan Ramírez
FW	20	(Honduras) Juan Mejía
FW	21	(Honduras) Rony Flores
Substitutions:
MF	16	(Honduras) Esdras Padilla	(substituted on) 56'
MF	23	(Honduras) Randy Diamond	(substituted on) 56'
MF	10	(Honduras) Carlos Lanza	(substituted on) 69'
Manager:
(Honduras) Wilmer Cruz

==== Semifinals ====
1st seeded	Agg.	4th seeded	1st leg	2nd leg
Olimpia	2–0	Motagua	0–0	2–0
2nd seeded	Agg.	3rd seeded	1st leg	2nd leg
Real Sociedad	5–2	Real España	2–2	3–0

Match details
12 May 2016
19:00 (UTC−06:00)
1st leg

Motagua	0–0	Olimpia
	Report

Estadio Tiburcio Carías Andino
Tegucigalpa, Francisco Morazán
Attendance: 6,947
Referee: Héctor Rodríguez

Motagua	Olimpia

GK	1	(Argentina) Sebastián Portigliatti
DF	2	(Honduras) Juan Montes
DF	3	(Honduras) Henry Figueroa	(substituted off) 40'
DF	4	(Honduras) Júnior Izaguirre	(yellow card) 70'
DF	18	(Honduras) Wilmer Crisanto
DF	27	(Honduras) Félix Crisanto	(yellow card) 29'
MF	6	(Honduras) Reinieri Mayorquín	(yellow card) 55'	(substituted off) 83'
MF	22	(Argentina) Santiago Vergara
FW	10	(Brazil) Israel Silva	(substituted off) 66'
FW	11	(Argentina) Lucas Gómez
FW	14	(Honduras) Irvin Reyna	(yellow card) 42'
Substitutions:
DF	5	(Honduras) Marcelo Pereira	(substituted on) 40'
MF	7	(Honduras) Erick Andino	(substituted on) 66'
DF	24	(Honduras) Omar Elvir	(substituted on) 83'
Manager:
(Argentina) Diego Vásquez

GK	28	(Honduras) Donis Escober	(yellow card) 36'
DF	2	(Honduras) Kevin Álvarez	(yellow card) 71'
DF	4	(Brazil) Fábio de Souza
DF	5	(Honduras) Ever Alvarado
DF	30	(Honduras) Johnny Palacios	(red card) 72'
MF	6	(Honduras) David Meza	(substituted off) 56'
MF	16	(Honduras) Alexander López
MF	20	(Honduras) Óliver Morazán
FW	13	(Honduras) Carlo Costly
FW	17	(Honduras) Alberth Elis	(yellow card) 61'
FW	31	(Honduras) Romell Quioto	(yellow card) 18'	(substituted off) 84'
Substitutions:
MF	7	(Honduras) Carlos Mejía	(substituted on) 56'	(substituted off) 75'
DF	14	(Honduras) José Fonseca	(substituted on) 75'
MF	24	(Honduras) Mayron Flores	(substituted on) 84'
Manager:
(Argentina) Héctor Vargas

15 May 2016
16:00 (UTC−06:00)
2nd leg

Olimpia	2–0	Motagua
Costly 34'; Quioto 43'	Report

Estadio Tiburcio Carías Andino
Tegucigalpa, Francisco Morazán
Attendance: 14,516
Referee: Óscar Moncada

Olimpia	Motagua

GK	28	(Honduras) Donis Escober
DF	2	(Honduras) Kevin Álvarez	(substituted off) 59'
DF	4	(Brazil) Fábio de Souza
DF	5	(Honduras) Ever Alvarado	(yellow card) 66'
DF	14	(Honduras) José Fonseca
MF	16	(Honduras) Alexander López
MF	20	(Honduras) Óliver Morazán	(yellow card) 32'
MF	26	(Honduras) Óscar Salas
FW	13	(Honduras) Carlo Costly	(substituted off) 77'
FW	17	(Honduras) Alberth Elis
FW	31	(Honduras) Romell Quioto	(yellow card) 7'	(substituted off) 69'
Substitutions:
MF	29	(Honduras) German Mejía	(substituted on) 59'
MF	24	(Honduras) Mayron Flores	(substituted on) 69'	(yellow card) 85'
FW	33	(Honduras) Michaell Chirinos	(substituted on) 77'	(yellow card) 80'
Manager:
(Argentina) Héctor Vargas

GK	1	(Argentina) Sebastián Portigliatti
DF	2	(Honduras) Juan Montes	(yellow card) 86'
DF	4	(Honduras) Júnior Izaguirre	(substituted off) 46'
DF	5	(Honduras) Marcelo Pereira
DF	18	(Honduras) Wilmer Crisanto
DF	27	(Honduras) Félix Crisanto
MF	6	(Honduras) Reinieri Mayorquín	(yellow card) 73'
MF	22	(Argentina) Santiago Vergara
FW	10	(Brazil) Israel Silva
FW	14	(Honduras) Irvin Reyna	(yellow card) 10'	(substituted off) 46'
FW	11	(Argentina) Lucas Gómez	(yellow card) 67'	(substituted off) 71'
Substitutions:
MF	7	(Honduras) Erick Andino	(substituted on) 46'	(yellow card) 67'
DF	24	(Honduras) Omar Elvir	(substituted on) 46'
FW	21	(Honduras) Foslyn Grant	(substituted on) 71'
Manager:
(Argentina) Diego Vásquez

12 May 2016
19:00 (UTC−06:00)
1st leg

Real España	2–2	Real Sociedad
Cardozo 2'; Acosta 90+3' (pen.)	Report	23' (pen.) 56' Tobías

Estadio Francisco Morazán
San Pedro Sula, Cortés
Attendance: 5,141
Referee: Armando Castro

Real España	Real Sociedad

GK	22	(Honduras) Luis López	(yellow card) 27'
DF	2	(Honduras) Osman Chávez
DF	7	(Honduras) Odis Borjas
DF	25	(Honduras) Javier Portillo
DF	29	(Honduras) Allans Vargas	(yellow card) 27'
MF	6	(Honduras) Bryan Acosta	(yellow card) 76'
MF	17	(Uruguay) Bruno Foliados	(substituted off) 69'
MF	23	(Honduras) Edder Delgado
MF	38	(Honduras) Jhow Benavídez
FW	11	(Uruguay) Cristhian Gutiérrez	(substituted off) 73'
FW	35	(Uruguay) Claudio Cardozo	(yellow card) 61'
Substitutions:
MF	12	(Honduras) Gerson Rodas	(substituted on) 69'
FW	50	(Honduras) Darwin Arita	(substituted on) 73'
Manager:
(Uruguay) Miguel Falero

GK	1	(Honduras) Donaldo Morales
DF	2	(Honduras) Jhonatan Paz	(yellow card) 79'
DF	3	(Honduras) Robbie Matute
DF	4	(Honduras) Hilder Colón
DF	14	(Honduras) Carlos Solórzano
DF	18	(Honduras) Henrry Clark
DF	19	(Honduras) José Tobías	(substituted off) 87'
DF	23	(Honduras) Hárlinton Gutierres
MF	13	(Honduras) Sergio Peña	(substituted off) 77'
FW	7	(Honduras) Marco Vega	(yellow card) 47'
FW	11	(Honduras) Rony Martínez	(substituted off) 75'
Substitutions:
FW	9	(Honduras) Kemsie Abbott	(substituted on) 75'
MF	15	(Honduras) Enuar Salgado	(substituted on) 77'
MF	31	(Honduras) Pablo Arzú	(substituted on) 87'
Manager:
(Honduras) Mauro Reyes

15 May 2016
14:00 (UTC−06:00)
2nd leg

Real Sociedad	3–0	Real España
Martínez 3' 38'; Vega 65' (pen.)	Report

Estadio Francisco Martínez Durón
Tocoa, Colón
Attendance: 2,720
Referee: Melvin Matamoros

Real Sociedad	Real España

GK	1	(Honduras) Donaldo Morales
DF	2	(Honduras) Jhonatan Paz	(yellow card) 29'	(substituted off) 67'
DF	3	(Honduras) Robbie Matute	(red card) 56'
DF	4	(Honduras) Hilder Colón
DF	18	(Honduras) Henrry Clark
DF	19	(Honduras) José Tobías
DF	23	(Honduras) Hárlinton Gutierres
MF	13	(Honduras) Sergio Peña
FW	7	(Honduras) Marco Vega	(substituted off) 70'
FW	11	(Honduras) Rony Martínez	(substituted off) 66'
FW	24	(Honduras) Cristhian Altamirano
Substitutions:
DF	14	(Honduras) Carlos Solórzano	(substituted on) 66'
MF	20	(Honduras) Elkin González	(substituted on) 67'
FW	10	(Honduras) Jerry Palacios	(substituted on) 70'
Manager:
(Honduras) Mauro Reyes

GK	22	(Honduras) Luis López	(red card) 59'
DF	2	(Honduras) Osman Chávez
DF	7	(Honduras) Odis Borjas
DF	25	(Honduras) Javier Portillo
DF	29	(Honduras) Allans Vargas	(red card) 56'
MF	6	(Honduras) Bryan Acosta	(substituted off) 78'
MF	19	(Honduras) Iván López	(yellow card) 32'	(substituted off) 63'
MF	20	(Honduras) José Arévalo
MF	23	(Honduras) Edder Delgado
MF	38	(Honduras) Jhow Benavídez
FW	35	(Uruguay) Claudio Cardozo	(substituted off) 62'
Substitutions:
GK	1	(Honduras) Kevin Hernández	(substituted on) 62'
FW	11	(Uruguay) Cristhian Gutiérrez	(substituted on) 63'
DF	28	(Honduras) César Oseguera	(substituted on) 78'
Manager:
(Uruguay) Miguel Falero

==== Final ====
1st seeded	Agg.	2nd seeded	1st leg	2nd leg
Olimpia	5–2	Real Sociedad	2–1	3–1

Match details
18 May 2016
14:00 (UTC−06:00)
1st leg

Real Sociedad	1–2	Olimpia
Palacios 86' (pen.)	Report	35' López; 67' Costly

Estadio Francisco Martínez Durón
Tocoa, Colón
Attendance: 2,447
Referee: Óscar Moncada

Real Sociedad	Olimpia

GK	1	(Honduras) Donaldo Morales
DF	2	(Honduras) Jhonatan Paz
DF	4	(Honduras) Hilder Colón
DF	14	(Honduras) Carlos Solórzano	(yellow card) 27'	(substituted off) 59'
DF	18	(Honduras) Henrry Clark
DF	19	(Honduras) José Tobías	(substituted off) 84'
DF	23	(Honduras) Hárlinton Gutierres
MF	13	(Honduras) Sergio Peña	(substituted off) 53'
FW	7	(Honduras) Marco Vega
FW	11	(Honduras) Rony Martínez
FW	24	(Honduras) Cristhian Altamirano
Substitutions:
FW	9	(Honduras) Kemsie Abbott	(substituted on) 53'
FW	10	(Honduras) Jerry Palacios	(substituted on) 59'
DF	17	(Honduras) Osman Melgares	(substituted on) 84'
Manager:
(Honduras) Mauro Reyes

GK	28	(Honduras) Donis Escober	(yellow card) 77'
DF	2	(Honduras) Kevin Álvarez
DF	4	(Brazil) Fábio de Souza
DF	5	(Honduras) Ever Alvarado
DF	14	(Honduras) José Fonseca
MF	6	(Honduras) David Meza	(yellow card) 63'
MF	16	(Honduras) Alexander López	(substituted off) 55'
MF	20	(Honduras) Óliver Morazán
MF	26	(Honduras) Óscar Salas	(substituted off) 77'
FW	13	(Honduras) Carlo Costly
FW	31	(Honduras) Romell Quioto	(substituted off) 59'
Substitutions:
DF	30	(Honduras) Johnny Palacios	(substituted on) 55'
FW	17	(Honduras) Alberth Elis	(substituted on) 59'
MF	24	(Honduras) Mayron Flores	(substituted on) 77'
Manager:
(Argentina) Héctor Vargas

22 May 2016
16:00 (UTC−06:00)
2nd leg

Olimpia	3–1	Real Sociedad
Salas 70'; Solórzano 74' (o.g.); Costly 90+3'	Report	53' Vega

Estadio Tiburcio Carías Andino
Tegucigalpa, Francisco Morazán
Attendance: 27,827
Referee: Melvin Matamoros

Olimpia	Real Sociedad

GK	28	(Honduras) Donis Escober
DF	2	(Honduras) Kevin Álvarez
DF	4	(Brazil) Fábio de Souza
DF	5	(Honduras) Ever Alvarado	(yellow card) 88'
DF	30	(Honduras) Johnny Palacios
MF	16	(Honduras) Alexander López	(substituted off) 88'
MF	20	(Honduras) Óliver Morazán
MF	26	(Honduras) Óscar Salas	(substituted off) 74'
FW	13	(Honduras) Carlo Costly
FW	17	(Honduras) Alberth Elis
FW	31	(Honduras) Romell Quioto	(substituted off) 19'
Substitutions:
FW	33	(Honduras) Michaell Chirinos	(substituted on) 19'
MF	7	(Honduras) Carlos Mejía	(substituted on) 74'	(yellow card) 81'
MF	29	(Honduras) German Mejía	(substituted on) 88'
Manager:
(Argentina) Héctor Vargas

GK	1	(Honduras) Donaldo Morales
DF	2	(Honduras) Jhonatan Paz	(substituted off) 41'
DF	4	(Honduras) Hilder Colón
DF	14	(Honduras) Carlos Solórzano
DF	18	(Honduras) Henrry Clark
DF	19	(Honduras) José Tobías
DF	23	(Honduras) Hárlinton Gutierres
MF	20	(Honduras) Elkin González	(substituted off) 73'
FW	7	(Honduras) Marco Vega
FW	11	(Honduras) Rony Martínez	(yellow card) 33'	(substituted off) 56'
FW	24	(Honduras) Cristhian Altamirano
Substitutions:
MF	13	(Honduras) Sergio Peña	(substituted on) 41'
FW	10	(Honduras) Jerry Palacios	(substituted on) 56'
FW	9	(Honduras) Kemsie Abbott	(substituted on) 73'
Manager:
(Honduras) Mauro Reyes

== Top goalscorers ==
As of 22 May 2016

- 25 goals:

(Honduras) Marco Vega (Real Sociedad)

- 18 goals:

(Honduras) Alberth Elis (Olimpia)

- 17 goals:

(Uruguay) Claudio Cardozo (Real España)

- 15 goals:

(Brazil) Israel Silva (Motagua)

- 14 goals:

Ángel Tejeda (Honduras Progreso)
(Honduras) Rony Flores (Platense / Juticalpa)

- 13 goals:

(Argentina) Lucas Gómez (Motagua)

- 11 goals:

(Honduras) Diego Reyes (Marathón)
(Honduras) Eddie Hernández (Motagua)
(Honduras) José Tobías (Real Sociedad)

- 10 goals:

(Honduras) Franco Güity (Vida)
(Honduras) Erick Andino (Motagua)
(Honduras) Carlo Costly (Olimpia)

- 9 goals:

Frédixon Elvir (Honduras Progreso)
(Honduras) Romell Quioto (Olimpia)

- 8 goals:

(Argentina) Santiago Vergara (Motagua)
(Honduras) Víctor Ortiz (Victoria)

- 7 goals:

(Colombia) Javier Estupiñán (Olimpia)
(Honduras) Christian Altamirano (Real Sociedad)
(Honduras) Jhow Benavídez (Real España)
(Honduras) Rony Martínez (Real Sociedad)
(Honduras) Jesús Canales (Vida)

- 6 goals:

(Honduras) Michaell Chirinos (Olimpia)
(Honduras) Jairo Puerto (Marathón)
Franklyn Morales (Honduras Progreso)
(Honduras) Jerry Palacios (Real Sociedad)
(Honduras) Julio de León (Platense)

- 5 goals:

(Honduras) Ever Alvarado (Olimpia)
(Honduras) Carlos Lanza (Juticalpa)
(Honduras) Iván López (Real España)
(Honduras) Bryan Moya (Vida)
(Honduras) Bryan Acosta (Real España)
(Honduras) Kevin López (Motagua)
Pedro Mencía (Honduras Progreso)

- 4 goals:

(Honduras) Mario Berríos (Marathón)
(Honduras) Esdras Padilla (Juticalpa)
(Honduras) Bayron Méndez (Olimpia)
(Honduras) Luis Lobo (Platense)
(Brazil) Josimar Moreira (Marathón)
(Colombia) Mario Abadía (Platense / Victoria)
Jorge Zaldívar (Honduras Progreso)
(Honduras) Juan Mejía (Real España / Juticalpa)
(Brazil) Douglas Caetano (Juticalpa)
(Honduras) Henry Martínez (Real Sociedad)
(Mali) Mamadou Traoré (Platense)
(Honduras) Erick Bernárdez (Juticalpa)
(Honduras) Walter Martínez (Marathón)
(Honduras) Javier Portillo (Juticalpa / Real España)
(Honduras) Óscar Salas (Olimpia)

- 3 goals:

(Honduras) Allan Lalín (Platense)
Edwin León (Honduras Progreso)
(Honduras) Kemsie Abbott (Real Sociedad)
(Honduras) Reinieri Mayorquín (Motagua)
(Honduras) Carlos Mejía (Olimpia)
(Uruguay) Christian Gutiérrez (Real España)
(Honduras) Gerson Rodas (Real España)
(Honduras) José Arévalo (Vida / Real España)
(Honduras) Juan Ocampo (Juticalpa)
(Honduras) Miguel Castillo (Victoria)
(Honduras) Nery Medina (Victoria)
(Honduras) Roger Rojas (Olimpia)
(Honduras) Wilmer Crisanto (Motagua)
(Honduras) Kevin Álvarez (Olimpia)
(Honduras) Sendel Cruz (Juticalpa)
(Argentina) Luciano Ursino (Real España)
Pastor Martínez (Honduras Progreso)
(Honduras) Maycol Montero (Vida)
(Honduras) Juan Montes (Motagua)
(Honduras) Samuel Córdova (Marathón)
(Honduras) Edder Delgado (Real España)
(Colombia) William Zapata (Marathón)

- 2 goals:

(Honduras) Ramón Núñez (Real España)
(Honduras) Ian Osorio (Platense)
Carlos Sánchez (Honduras Progreso)
(Honduras) Omar Elvir (Motagua)
(Honduras) Carlos Bernárdez (Victoria)
Mariano Acevedo (Honduras Progreso)
(Honduras) Bryan Ramírez (Juticalpa)
(Honduras) Juan Munguía (Real Sociedad)
(Honduras) Marlon Mancías (Victoria)
(Honduras) José García (Juticalpa)
(Honduras) Aldo Oviedo (Juticalpa)
(Honduras) José Güity (Vida)
(Honduras) Randy Diamond (Victoria / Juticalpa)
(Honduras) Alexander López (Olimpia)
Dederick Cálix (Honduras Progreso)
(Honduras) Darvis Argueta (Marathón)
(Honduras) Henry Bermúdez (Vida)
(Honduras) Alexander Aguilar (Platense)
(Honduras) Porciano Ávila (Victoria)
Juan Delgado (Honduras Progreso)

- 1 goal:

(Honduras) Luis Berríos (Marathón)
(Honduras) Harlinton Gutiérrez (Real España)
(Honduras) Bryan Johnson (Olimpia)
(Honduras) Osman Melgares (Real Sociedad)
(Honduras) Carlos Palacios (Marathón)
(Honduras) Enuar Salgado (Real Sociedad)
(Brazil) Fábio de Souza (Olimpia)
(Argentina) Julián Fernández (Real España)
(Honduras) Foslyn Grant (Motagua)
(Honduras) José Fonseca (Olimpia)
(Honduras) Hilder Colón (Real Sociedad)
(Argentina) Mariano Lutzky (Vida)
(Honduras) Sergio Mendoza (Juticalpa)
(Honduras) Getsel Montes (Platense)
(Honduras) Irvin Reyna (Motagua)
(Colombia) Robert Campaz (Platense)
(Honduras) Dennis Castillo (Victoria)
(Colombia) Éder Munive (Marathón)
(Honduras) Darwin Mejía (Vida)
(Honduras) Elkin González (Real Sociedad)
(Honduras) Johnny Palacios (Olimpia)
(Honduras) Bryan Martínez (Victoria)
(Honduras) Shalton González (Real Sociedad)
(Honduras) Arnold Peralta (Olimpia)
(Honduras) Félix Crisanto (Motagua)
(Honduras) Orvin Paz (Juticalpa)
(Honduras) Marlon Peña (Juticalpa)
(Honduras) Kevin Maradiaga (Vida)
(Honduras) Allan Banegas (Marathón)
(Argentina) Franco Tisera (Victoria)
(Honduras) David Carranza (Real Sociedad)
(Honduras) Mayron Flores (Olimpia)
(Honduras) German Mejía (Olimpia)
(Colombia) Luis Castro (Platense)
(Honduras) Pablo Álvarez (Real España)
(Honduras) Raúl Santos (Vida)
(Honduras) Robbie Matute (Real Sociedad)
(Honduras) Norberto García (Vida)
Leonardo Isaula (Honduras Progreso)
(Honduras) Marcelo Pereira (Motagua)
(Honduras) Devron García (Victoria)
(Honduras) Román Castillo (Motagua)
(Honduras) Marvin Bernárdez (Vida)
(Honduras) Darixon Vuelto (Victoria)
(Honduras) David Mendoza (Platense)
(Honduras) Nissi Sauceda (Victoria)
(Honduras) Román Valencia (Real España)
(Honduras) Cholby Martínez (Vida)
(Uruguay) Richard Rodríguez (Platense)
(Honduras) Georgie Welcome (Marathón)
(Honduras) Rembrandt Flores (Olimpia)
(Honduras) Roby Norales (Platense)
(Honduras) Víctor Berríos (Marathón)
(Honduras) Júnior Lacayo (Victoria)
(Honduras) Joshua Vargas (Marathón)
(Honduras) Darwin Arita (Real España)

- 1 own goal:

(Honduras) Juan Montes (Motagua)
(Honduras) Cholby Martínez (Vida)
(Honduras) Marcelo Pereira (Motagua)
(Honduras) Henry Figueroa (Motagua)
(Honduras) Mauricio Sabillón (Marathón)
(Honduras) Carlos Solórzano (Real Sociedad)

- 2 own goals:

(Honduras) Wilfredo Barahona (Real España)

== Aggregate table ==
Relegation is determined by the aggregated table of both Apertura and Clausura tournaments. On 10 April 2016, C.D. Victoria officially became the team relegated to Liga de Ascenso.

Pos	Team	Pld	W	D	L	GF	GA	GD	Pts	Qualification or relegation
1	Olimpia	36	19	6	11	69	38	+31	63	2016–17 CONCACAF Champions League
2	Motagua	36	18	8	10	69	47	+22	62	
3	Real Sociedad	36	16	12	8	61	37	+24	60	
4	Honduras Progreso	36	14	9	13	52	51	+1	51	2016–17 CONCACAF Champions League
5	Juticalpa	36	14	8	14	44	44	0	50	
6	Marathón	36	13	10	13	44	40	+4	49	
7	Real España	36	12	11	13	55	58	−3	47	
8	Vida	36	11	12	13	37	48	−11	45	
9	Platense	36	8	13	15	38	54	−16	37	
10	Victoria	36	5	11	20	30	82	−52	26	Relegation to the 2016–17 Liga de Ascenso

Updated to match(es) played on 1 May 2016. Source:

== Attendances ==
#	Football club	Average attendance
1	CD Olimpia	4,883
2	Juticalpa	4,850
3	CDS Vida	3,845
4	Honduras Progreso	3,838
5	Motagua	2,279
6	CD Marathón	2,162
7	Platense FC	1,878
8	CD Victoria	1,811
9	Real Sociedad de Tocoa	1,602
10	Real España	1,372
