= 2015 Honduran Supercup =

Motagua	Olimpia
- Date: 8 August 2015

The 2015 Honduran Supercup was a match arranged by the Honduran Liga Nacional which was scheduled to take place on 8 August 2015 between C.D. Motagua, winners of the 2014–15 Honduran Liga Nacional (Apertura) and C.D. Olimpia, winners of the 2015 Honduran Cup. This would have been the third edition of the Honduran Supercup and the first one since 1999; however the match appears to have been abandoned with no disclosed reason.

== The game ==
8 August 2015
(UTC−06:00)

Motagua	A	Olimpia

Juticalpa, Olancho
Estadio Juan Ramón Brevé Vargas

== See also ==
- 2015–16 Honduran Liga Nacional
- 2015–16 Honduran Cup
