= 2026 Honduran Supercup =

- Poster of the event
- Event: Honduran Supercup
Olimpia	Motagua
1	0
- Date: 23 July 2026
- Venue: Estadio Nacional, Tegucigalpa
- Referee: Saíd Martínez
- Weather: 79° F

The 2026 Honduran Supercup will be a match arranged by the Honduran Liga Nacional which will take place during the summer of 2026 between C.D. Olimpia, winners of the 2025 Apertura and F.C. Motagua, winners of the 2026 Clausura. This will be the third official edition of the Honduran Supercup, the 7th overall, and the first under the current format.

C.D. Marathón are the defending champions.

== Qualified teams ==
Team	Method of qualification	Appearances	Previous best
Olimpia	Winners of 2025 Apertura	4th	Winners (1997, 2016 I, 2016 II)
Motagua	Winners of 2026 Clausura	3rd	Winners (1999, 2017)

== Background ==
The game was announced before the start of the 2025–26 season. The competition hasn't been played since 2019.

== Match ==
23 July 2026	Olimpia	1–0	Motagua	Tegucigalpa
19:00	Cuello 54'			Stadium: Estadio Nacional; Referee: Saíd Martínez

== See also ==
- 2026–27 Honduran Liga Nacional
