= Carlos Lanza =

Honduran footballer (born 1989)

Personal information
- Full name: Carlos Ovidio Lanza Martínez
- Date of birth: 15 May 1989 (age 37)
- Place of birth: Talanga, Honduras
- Height: 1.84 m (6 ft 1/2 in)
- Position: Forward

Team information
- Current team: Juticalpa
- Number: 10

Senior career*
Years	Team	Apps	(Gls)
2007–2010	Municipal Silca		
2011	Juventus		
2012–	Juticalpa		

International career^{‡}
2017–2018	Honduras	7	(0)
- * Club domestic league appearances and goals as of 28 May 2017 ‡ National team caps and goals as of 2 June 2018

Carlos Ovidio Lanza Martínez (born 15 May 1989) is a Honduran professional footballer who plays as a forward for Honduran club Juticalpa F.C..

== Honduras national team ==
Lanza was called to represent the Honduras national football team in the 2017 CONCACAF Gold Cup

== Honours and achievements ==
=== Juticalpa ===
- Liga de Ascenso:
  - Winners (3): 2012–13 A, 2014–15 A, 2014–15 C
  - Runners-up (1): 2013–14 C
- Honduran Cup:
  - Winners (1): 2015–16
- Honduran Supercup:
  - Runners-up (1): 2016
