= 2016 Honduran Supercup (December) =

Juticalpa	Olimpia
0	3
- Date: 30 December 2016
- Venue: Estadio Juan Ramón Brevé Vargas, Juticalpa
- Referee: Héctor Núñez

The 2016 Honduran Supercup was a match arranged by the Honduran Liga Nacional which took place on 30 December 2016 between Juticalpa F.C., winners of the 2015–16 Honduran Cup and Club Deportivo Olimpia, winners of the 2015–16 Liga Nacional (Clausura tournament).

== Qualified teams ==
Team	Method of qualification	Appearances
Juticalpa	Winners of 2015–16 Honduran Cup	1st
Olimpia	Winners of 2015–16 Honduran Liga Nacional (Clausura)	3rd

== Background ==
Both Juticalpa F.C. and Club Deportivo Olimpia qualified as reigning champions of the 2015–16 season (Cup and League respectively). Juticalpa defeated Real C.D. España in the Cup final with a 2–1 score. Meanwhile, Olimpia was crowned as 2015–16 Clausura champions after convincingly overcoming in the finals against C.D. Real Sociedad with a 5–2 global result.

The previous match between both sides ended with a 1–2 away win to Olimpia at Estadio Juan Ramón Brevé Vargas on 2 November 2016 in a league encounter.

== Match ==
The game started at 19:00 CST as scheduled. Club Deportivo Olimpia entered the field with their alternate uniform, while Juticalpa F.C. used their home kits. Olimpia's recently signed midfielder Brayan Velásquez opened the scoreboard at the 24th minute. Before the end of the first half, Olimpia's coach Héctor Vargas instructed his players to abandon the match claiming that Juticalpa was playing too violent and the referee was being too permissive. Minutes after, Olimpia decided to resume the game. The second half started despite the first one didn't end. Adding to the controversy, referee Héctor Núñez, who had sent-off Olimpia's defender Elmer Güity in the first half, allowed Olimpia to make a substitution in the second half and let them resume the match with eleven players; failing to execute Law 12. Michaell Chirinos (66th) and Óscar Salas (81st) sealed the victory and gave Olimpia its 3rd ever Honduran Supercup.

30 December 2016
19:00 CST

Juticalpa	0–3	Olimpia
		24' Velásquez; 66' Chirinos; 81' Salas

Juticalpa, Olancho
Estadio Juan Ramón Brevé Vargas
Referee: Héctor Núñez

Juticalpa	Olimpia

GK	31	(Honduras) José Zúniga
DF	2	(Honduras) Marlon Peña
DF	4	(Honduras) José Murillo
MF	5	(Honduras) Jesús Munguía
MF	7	(Honduras) Juan Ocampo
MF	10	(Honduras) Carlos Lanza
MF	14	(Honduras) Ángel Oseguera
MF	16	(Honduras) Esdras Padilla
MF	17	(Honduras) Brayan Ramírez
MF	22	(Honduras) Alexander Aguilar
MF	30	(Honduras) José Willians
Substitutions:
Manager:
(Honduras) Jorge Pineda

GK	1	(Honduras) Edrick Menjívar
DF	3	(Honduras) Elmer Güity
DF	12	(Honduras) Bryan Johnson
DF	19	(Honduras) José Tobías
DF	64	(Honduras) Elvin Casildo
MF	7	(Honduras) Carlos Mejía
MF	10	(Honduras) Bayron Méndez
MF	16	(Honduras) Gerson Rodas
MF	29	(Honduras) German Mejía
MF	–	(Honduras) Brayan Velásquez
FW	–	(Honduras) Roger Rojas
Substitutions:
Manager:
(Argentina) Héctor Vargas

== See also ==
- 2016–17 Honduran Liga Nacional
- 2017 Honduran Cup
