= Carlo Costly =

Honduran footballer (born 1982)

Personal information
- Full name: Carlo Yaír Costly Molina
- Date of birth: 18 July 1982 (age 44)
- Place of birth: San Pedro Sula, Honduras
- Height: 1.90 m (6 ft 3 in)
- Position: Striker

Youth career
- Atlético Celaya
- Monarcas Morelia
- Atlas
- UNAM

Senior career*
Years	Team	Apps	(Gls)
2006–2007	Platense	19	(10)
2007	→ GKS Bełchatów (loan)	11	(6)
2007–2010	GKS Bełchatów	48	(8)
2009	→ Birmingham City (loan)	8	(0)
2010	Vaslui	13	(4)
2011–2012	Atlas	11	(2)
2011	→ Houston Dynamo (loan)	11	(1)
2012–2013	Veria	25	(6)
2013	Guizhou Zhicheng	11	(7)
2014	Real España	13	(7)
2014–2015	Gaziantepspor	7	(0)
2015–2018	Olimpia	87	(38)
2019–2020	Marathón	35	(11)
2020	Platense	10	(1)
2021	Marathón	20	(5)
2022–2024	Lone FC	11	(4)

International career
2007–2017	Honduras	78	(32)
- * Club domestic league appearances and goals as of 22 June 2022

Carlo Yaír Costly Molina (Spanish pronunciation: [ˈkaɾlo ˈkostli]; born 18 July 1982) is a Honduran former professional footballer who played as a striker.

Prior to moving to Europe, he played with Platense, where he was the top scorer of the Honduras Apertura in 2006–07.

== Club career ==
Carlo Costly is the son of Anthony Costly. His parents separated and his mother, soon after, married a Mexican. Costly moved to Mexico City when he was 14 years old and lived there for the following 11 years where he kicked off his football career. He had spells in the Mexican league with the reserve teams of Atlético Celaya, Monarcas Morelia, Atlas and Pumas UNAM.

He moved back to Honduras where the path to international success began. Despite leaving Mexico, Costly still keeps a house in the state of Nayarit. His big chance was given to him by Club Deportivo Platense and, with them, he became the top scorer of the Honduras Apertura 2006–07, scoring ten goals in 19 games.

His early success earned him a chance with Polish club GKS Bełchatów, who loaned him for half a season. Having impressed, the club spent a record €500,000 on signing him.

After a while he became unsettled in Poland, and was linked in the press with a move to Football League Championship side Plymouth Argyle, and supposedly linked with League One side Leeds United, before being reported to be on trial with Premier League side Birmingham City. Costly remained at GKS Bełchatów for the time being.

In January 2009, Costly joined Birmingham City of the second tier of English football on loan until the end of the 2008–09 season. He made his debut for the club on 7 February 2009, coming on as a second-half substitute in a 1–1 draw with Burnley. The loan was not made permanent at the end of the season.

On 24 January 2010, Costly was bought by SC Vaslui, signing a 3.5-year contract. He was injured and treated in Italy where they told him he would recover before 2010 FIFA World Cup, but he was unable to rejoin the Honduras national football team due to FIFA rules. He then went on to sign for Atlas in Mexico, once he recovered from his injury.

Costly spent the latter part of the 2011 Major League Soccer season on loan with Houston Dynamo. In September 2012, Veria F.C. announced Carlos Costly's transfer.

Costly joined China League One side Guizhou Zhicheng on 24 July 2013. On 4 August, he scored two goals in his debut against Yanbian Baekdu Tigers.

Costly signed for Real España on 2 January 2014. After the 2014 FIFA World Cup, he stated he would not return to the national team and joined Gaziantepspor at the beginning of the 2014–15 season.

In 2015, Costly joined Olimpia, a move that lasted four years until his signing for Marathón.

== International career ==
Since scoring on his debut against Trinidad and Tobago in 2007, Costly has been a standout performer for the Honduras national team helping the Catrachos reach the semi-finals of the CONCACAF Gold Cup in 2009 and 2011. He is the Honduras national team's second-top goalscorer of all time in Gold Cup matches, scoring eight goals, including a hat-trick against Grenada in the 2011 tournament.

He was an important member of the Honduran team that qualified for the 2010 FIFA World Cup but was unable to play at the tournament finals due to injury.

Costly scored seven goals in 13 appearances in 2014 FIFA World Cup qualification, including a hat-trick against Canada. In June 2014, he was named in the Honduran squad for the 2014 FIFA World Cup. Costly made his FIFA World Cup debut in a 3–0 defeat against France on 15 June. In the next match, he scored his country's first World Cup goal in 32 years as the team lost 2–1 to Ecuador. Costly started the final Honduras game of the 2014 FIFA World Cup but limped off injured in the 39th minute. Immediately after the match, Costly announced his retirement from the national team stating that "we have to give opportunities to the young players." Despite this, Costly was still called up to the Honduras national team for the 2018 World Cup qualifiers Costly's last ever match with Honduras was in a 0–0 draw with Australia in the first leg of the 2018 CONCACAF–AFC intercontinental playoff where he came on the 73rd minute replacing Anthony Lozano.

== Career statistics ==
=== Club ===
As of 28 April 2013

Appearances and goals by club, season and competition
Club	Season	League			Domestic Cups		Continental		Total	
Club	Season	Division	Apps	Goals	Apps	Goals	Apps	Goals	Apps	Goals
Platense	2006–07	LINA	18	10	–		–		18	10
Bełchatów	2006–07	Ekstraklasa	11	6	2	2	–		13	8
Bełchatów	2007–08	Ekstraklasa	26	5	5	0	2	0	33	5
Bełchatów	2008–09	Ekstraklasa	12	2	0	0	0	0	12	2
Bełchatów	2009–10	Ekstraklasa	10	1	0	0	0	0	10	1
Bełchatów	Total		59	14	7	2	2	0	68	16
Vaslui	2009–10	Liga I	13	4	–		–		13	4
Veria	2012–13	Super League Greece	25	6	2	2	–		27	8
Career total			115	34	9	4	2	0	126	38

=== International ===
Scores and results list Honduras goal tally first, score column indicates score after each Costly goal.

List of international goals scored by Carlo Costly
No.	Date	Venue	Opponent	Score	Result	Competition
1	2 June 2007	Estadio Francisco Morazán, San Pedro Sula, Honduras	Trinidad and Tobago	3–1	3–1	Friendly
2	8 June 2007	Giants Stadium, East Rutherford, United States	Panama	2–3	2–3	2007 CONCACAF Gold Cup
3	10 June 2007	Giants Stadium, East Rutherford, United States	Mexico	1–1	2–1	2007 CONCACAF Gold Cup
4	10 June 2007	Giants Stadium, East Rutherford, United States	Mexico	2–1	2–1	2007 CONCACAF Gold Cup
5	6 February 2008	Estadio Olímpico Metropolitano, San Pedro Sula, Honduras	Paraguay	2–0	2–0	Friendly
6	11 October 2008	Estadio Olímpico Metropolitano, San Pedro Sula, Honduras	Canada	2–1	3–1	2010 FIFA World Cup qualification
7	1 April 2009	Estadio Olímpico Metropolitano, San Pedro Sula, Honduras	Mexico	1–0	3–1	2010 FIFA World Cup qualification
8	1 April 2009	Estadio Olímpico Metropolitano, San Pedro Sula, Honduras	Mexico	3–0	3–1	2010 FIFA World Cup qualification
9	6 June 2009	Soldier Field, Chicago, United States	United States	1–0	1–2	2010 FIFA World Cup qualification
10	4 July 2009	Qwest Field, Seattle, United States	Haiti	1–0	1–0	2009 CONCACAF Gold Cup
11	11 July 2009	Gillette Stadium, Foxborough, United States	Grenada	4–0	4–0	2009 CONCACAF Gold Cup
12	12 August 2009	Estadio Olímpico Metropolitano, San Pedro Sula, Honduras	Costa Rica	1–0	4–0	2010 FIFA World Cup qualification
13	12 August 2009	Estadio Olímpico Metropolitano, San Pedro Sula, Honduras	Costa Rica	4–0	4–0	2010 FIFA World Cup qualification
14	14 November 2009	Estadio Tiburcio Carías Andino, Tegucigalpa, Honduras	Latvia	1–0	2–1	Friendly
15	29 May 2011	Robertson Stadium, Houston, United States	El Salvador	1–0	2–2	Friendly
16	10 June 2011	FIU Stadium, Miami, United States	Grenada	2–1	7–1	2011 CONCACAF Gold Cup
17	10 June 2011	FIU Stadium, Miami, United States	Grenada	4–1	7–1	2011 CONCACAF Gold Cup
18	10 June 2011	FIU Stadium, Miami, United States	Grenada	5–1	7–1	2011 CONCACAF Gold Cup
19	10 August 2011	Lockhart Stadium, Fort Lauderdale, United States	Venezuela	1–0	2–0	Friendly
20	10 August 2011	Lockhart Stadium, Fort Lauderdale, United States	Venezuela	2–0	2–0	Friendly
21	2 June 2012	Robert F. Kennedy Memorial Stadium, Washington, D.C., United States	El Salvador	3–0	3–0	Friendly
22	16 October 2012	Estadio Olímpico Metropolitano, San Pedro Sula, Honduras	Canada	3–0	8–1	2014 FIFA World Cup qualification
23	16 October 2012	Estadio Olímpico Metropolitano, San Pedro Sula, Honduras	Canada	5–0	8–1	2014 FIFA World Cup qualification
24	16 October 2012	Estadio Olímpico Metropolitano, San Pedro Sula, Honduras	Canada	8–1	8–1	2014 FIFA World Cup qualification
25	22 March 2013	Estadio Olímpico Metropolitano, San Pedro Sula, Honduras	Mexico	1–2	2–2	2014 FIFA World Cup qualification
26	6 September 2013	Estadio Azteca, Mexico City, Mexico	Mexico	2–1	2–1	2014 FIFA World Cup qualification
27	10 September 2013	Estadio Francisco Morazán, San Pedro Sula, Honduras	Panama	2–1	2–2	2014 FIFA World Cup qualification
28	15 October 2013	Independence Park, Kingston, Jamaica	Jamaica	1–0	2–2	2014 FIFA World Cup qualification
29	19 November 2013	BBVA Compass Stadium, Houston, United States	Ecuador	1–1	2–2	Friendly
30	19 November 2013	BBVA Compass Stadium, Houston, United States	Ecuador	2–1	2–2	Friendly
31	1 June 2014	BBVA Compass Stadium, Houston, United States	Israel	2–4	2–4	Friendly
32	20 June 2014	Arena da Baixada, Curitiba, Brazil	Ecuador	1–0	1–2	2014 FIFA World Cup

== Honours ==
Houston Dynamo

- MLS Eastern Conference: 2011

Olimpia

- Liga Profesional de Honduras: 2015–16 C
- Honduran Supercup: 2016 I, 2016 II
- CONCACAF League: 2017

Marathón

- Honduran Supercup: 2019

Individual

- Top goalscorers in Liga Nacional de Honduras: 2006–07 A
