= Héctor Vargas =

Argentine footballer and manager

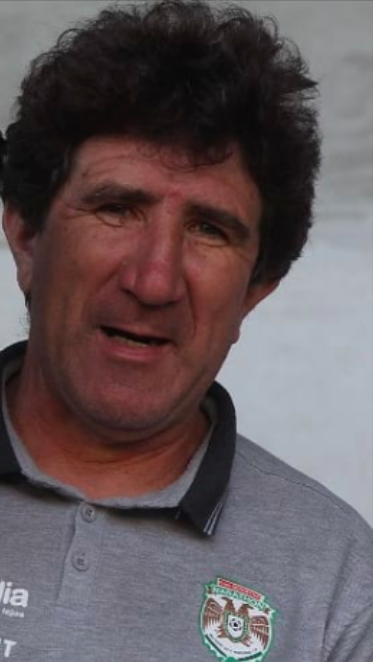
- Hector Vargas

Personal information
- Full name: Héctor Vargas
- Date of birth: 15 March 1959 (age 67)
- Place of birth: Ibarreta, Argentina
- Position: Midfielder

Senior career*
| Years | Team | Apps | (Gls) |
| 1979–1983 | Estudiantes | | |
| 1984–1986 | Temperley | | |
| 1986–1987 | Gimnasia | | |
| 1987–1988 | Bucaramanga | | |
| 1988–1991 | Estudiantes | | |

Managerial career
- 1992–1994: Estudiantes
- 1997–1999: Universidad
- 1999–2000: Vida
- 2000–2002: Universidad
- 2004–2005: Universidad
- 2006–2007: Platense
- 2007–2009: Hispano
- 2009–2011: Platense
- 2012–2013: Victoria
- 2013–2017: Olimpia
- 2017–2021: Marathón
- 2022–2023: Real España
- 2023-2024: C.D.S. Vida
- 2024: Zacapa
- 2024-: Real Sociedad
- * Club domestic league appearances and goals as of 8 December 2013

Héctor Vargas (born 15 March 1959) is an Argentinian football manager.

== Club career ==
As a player, Vargas started his career at Estudiantes, before having spells at Temperley, Gimnasia and in Colombia.

== Managerial career ==
Vargas alo started his managerial career at Estudiantes, before moving to Honduras to take charge of Universidad in 1997. He then managed Vida, Universidad again, Platense and from 2007 Hispano. He returned at Platense in May 2009. In January 2012 he was appointed manager of Victoria, where he stayed until 4 December 2013 when he was appointed manager of C.D. Olimpia. In 2017, he got sacked from Olimpia and was appointed as coach for C.D Marathón.

== Personal life ==
Vargas is married to a Honduran woman called Laura, born in August 28, 1978. and they have a daughter called Sofía, born in January 25, 2001 and two children, one called Stephano, born in April 5, 2005 and another called Mathias, born in March 24, 2014.

== Honours and awards ==
=== Club ===
C.D. Olimpia

- Liga Profesional de Honduras: 2013–14 C, 2014–15 C, 2015–16 C
- Honduran Cup: 2015
- Honduran Supercup: 2016 I, 2016 II

C.D. Marathón

- Liga Profesional de Honduras: 2017–18 C
- Honduran Supercup: 2019
