= Romell Quioto =

Honduran footballer (born 1991)

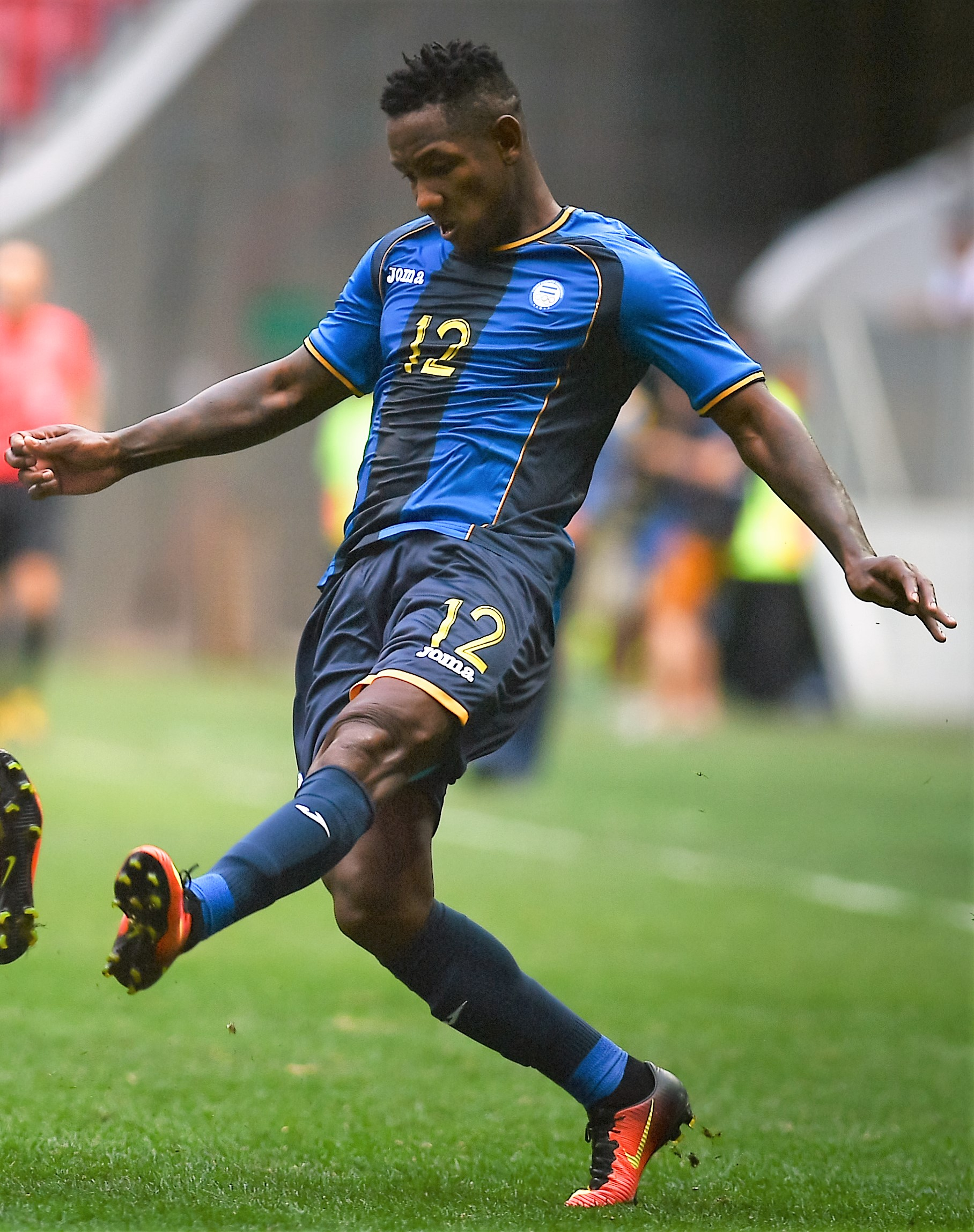
- Quioto with Honduras at the 2016 Summer Olympics

Personal information
- Full name: Romell Samir Quioto Robinson
- Date of birth: 9 August 1991 (age 35)
- Place of birth: Balfate, Honduras
- Height: 1.78 m (5 ft 10 in)
- Position: Forward

Team information
- Current team: Al-Ula
- Number: 67

Youth career
- 2008–2009: Unión Ájax

Senior career*
Years	Team	Apps	(Gls)
2010–2013	Vida	76	(19)
2012	→ Wisła Kraków (loan)	9	(0)
2014–2016	Olimpia	96	(38)
2017–2019	Houston Dynamo	76	(15)
2020–2023	CF Montréal	81	(35)
2024	Tractor	0	(0)
2024–2025	Al-Arabi (KSA)	41	(23)
2025–2026	Al-Najma (KSA)	9	(0)
2026	Al-Faisaly	17	(11)
2026–	Al-Ula	0	(0)

International career^{‡}
2010	Honduras U20	2	(0)
2012–2016	Honduras Olympic	8	(2)
2012–2025	Honduras	82	(19)
- * Club domestic league appearances and goals as of 21:15, 12 July 2026 (UTC) ‡ National team caps and goals as of 24 November 2025

Romell Samir Quioto Robinson (born 9 August 1991), nicknamed El Romántico (The Romantic), is a Honduran professional footballer who plays as a forward for Saudi First Division League club Al-Ula.

== Club career ==
=== C.D.S. Vida ===
Quioto came up through the youth ranks of Unión Ájax before being sold to Liga Nacional side C.D.S. Vida. Quioto made his debut for Vida in the Liga Nacional during the 2010 Clausura season and scored his first goal 6 March 2010 in a 4–1 victory over Real Juventud. For the 2012–13 season, he was loaned out to Polish Ekstraklasa side Wisła Kraków. He had 2 assists in his debut, a 5–0 win against Luboński 1943 in the Polish Cup Quioto stepped on a players leg on 31 August 2012 and received a five-game suspension. By the time he returned, Quioto had lost his place in the team and could only make a few substitute appearances. The loan was terminated in January 2013. Quioto returned to Vida for the 2013 Clausura and he finished joint top scorer for the 2013 Apertura

=== C.D. Olimpia ===
On 30 November 2013, Quioto signed with C.D. Olimpia. He made his debut for Olimpia on 12 January 2014 in a 1–1 draw against C.D. Real Sociedad. He scored his first goal for Olimpia on 26 January in their Clásico Moderno match against rival club Real España. He made his first appearance in the CONCACAF Champions League on 5 August 2014 against Alpha United. On 9 May 2015, Quioto played in the 2015 Honduran Cup, scoring a goal in the 3–1 win over Platense. Quioto was part of the Olimpia squad that won the 2014 Clausura, the 2015 Clausura, and the 2016 Clausura, as well as the 2015 Honduran Cup and the 2016 Honduran Supercup Clausura.

=== Houston Dynamo ===
On 23 December 2016, Romell Quioto was sold to Major League Soccer team Houston Dynamo. He scored on his Dynamo debut on 4 March 2017 in a 3–1 win over Seattle Sounders FC. The goal was named MLS Goal of the Week and he was named to the Team of the Week. He would score in his first 3 games for Houston. He scored in his next two games as well. After a quiet April, Quioto registered his fourth goal and his first assist for Houston on 6 May in a 4–0 win over Orlando City SC. Quioto helped the Dynamo qualify for the MLS Playoffs for the first time since 2013. The Dynamo reached the Western Conference Finals before falling to the Sounders.

in 2018, Quioto got off to a slow start, with no goals or assists in the first five matches. However, in the 6th game of the season, he scored once and assisted twice in a 5–1 win over Toronto. This was the start of a period of great form for Quioto, scoring three with six assists in a seven-game stretch. He was twice named to the MLS Team of the Week during this stretch. On September 29, Quioto scored in the 87th minute to give Houston a 3–2 win over the San Jose Earthquakes. In the final match of the regular season Quioto scored one to help the Dynamo overcome a 2–0 deficit to defeat the LA Galaxy 3–2. Quioto was named to the Team of the Week as a result. Although the Dynamo missed out on the MLS playoffs for 2018, they won the 2018 US Open Cup, the first in club history. He scored 2 goals in the Dynamo's 4–2 win over Sporting Kansas City on 18 July. In the final, Quioto hit a shot that resulted in an own-goal, helping the Dynamo defeat the Philadelphia Union 3–0. The Open Cup win qualified them for the 2019 CONCACAF Champions League. Quioto finished the year with 8 goals and 12 assists in 36 games across all competitions.

Quioto made his first appearance of the 2019 season in Houston's opening game, a 1–0 win over C.D. Guastatoya in the Champions League on 19 February. He picked up his first assist of the year on 9 March, sending in a cross that Mauro Manotas directed into the net in the 86th minute to give the Dynamo a 2–1 win over the Montreal Impact. Quioto scored his first goal of the season 6 July in a 3–2 defeat at FC Cincinnati. He would find the back of the net again in the Dynamo's next match, however they would lose again, this time to LAFC. On 8 August, Quioto was sent off for elbowing NYCFC defender Rónald Matarrita in the back of the head. The Dynamo would go on to lose 3–2. After the game, Dynamo head coach Wilmer Cabrera announced that he had apologized to the referees and the NYCFC coaches and players for Quioto's actions, stating "I will not tolerate it more on the team because we come to play football. I apologize to the fans, the Houston Dynamo team and the entire league because what happened today." Quioto apologized for his actions on social media after the game. On 16 August, the MLS announced that Quioto had been suspended an additional game, besides the automatic suspension for a red card, and fined an undisclosed amount for violent conduct as well as fined him for failing to leave the field quickly after receiving the red card. Even after the suspension, Quioto did not return to the Dynamo first team. He was not allowed in the locker room and trained separately from the rest of the team. On 7 October 2019, Quioto revealed through his social media accounts that he would no longer continue with the Dynamo. He had not played for two months.

=== CF Montréal ===
On 20 November 2019, Quioto was traded to the Montreal Impact, later renamed CF Montréal, in exchange for Víctor Cabrera and $100,000 in allocation money. In his debut, on 19 February 2020 against Deportivo Saprissa in the first leg of the CONCACAF Champions League Round of 16 tie, he scored once in a 2–2 draw. He started the return leg, a 0–0 draw that saw Montreal advance on away goals. He made his MLS debut for the Impact on 29 February, scoring once in a 2–1 over the New England Revolution. In early March, before matchweek 3, the MLS season was suspended due to the COVID-19 Pandemic. Play resumed in July with the MLS is Back Tournament, with group stage games counting for the regular season. Quioto scored once in four appearances as Montreal reached the round of 16 at the tournament. On 25 August, in the Impact's first game since the MLS is Back Tournament ended, Quioto scored once as Montreal beat Vancouver Whitecaps FC 2–0. He scored in consecutive matches on 13 September and 16 September, both against Vancouver. On 20 September he scored against the Philadelphia Union to make it a goal in three straight games. However, he did not finish the match as he was shown a red card in the 16th minute after elbowing Mark McKenzie of the Union in the head. In addition to the automatic one-game suspension for a red card, the MLS suspended him an additional match and fined him an undisclosed amount. On 8 November, in the final match of the regular season, Quioto set up Victor Wanyama in the 74th minute and scored in the 88th to give Montreal a 3–2 win over D.C. United, which enabled Montreal to qualify for the playoffs. On 20 November, in the Impact's opening match of the playoffs, Quioto scored once as Montreal lost 2–1 to the New England Revolution. On 30 November, Quioto signed a contract extension with Montreal until 2022 with a team option for 2023. Having amassed 8 goals and 6 assists in 19 appearances, he was named the Montreal Impact MVP.

=== Tractor ===
On 13 January 2024, after seven continuous seasons in Major League Soccer, Quioto joined Persian Gulf Pro League club Tractor. However, his contract was terminated on 2 February that year, without making a single appearance for the Iranian side.

=== Saudi Arabia ===
==== Al-Arabi ====
On 7 February 2024, Quioto signed with Saudi First Division League club Al-Arabi. He made his debut in the league the following 20 February, in a 1–0 away loss to Al-Safa Club. Quioto came off the bench and even scored a goal, but it was ruled out by VAR. He would go on to score his first goal for the club on 5 March, in a 5–2 away victory against city rivals Al-Najma. Quioto left the club following the expiration of his contract in the summer of 2025.

==== Al-Najma ====
On 3 August 2025, Quioto signed with newly promoted Saudi Pro League club Al-Najma.

==== Al-Faisaly ====
After ten appearances without a single goal contribution for Al-Najma, Quioto signed with second-tier side Al-Faisaly on 21 January 2026. He made his debut for the club five days later, scoring the third goal in the 3–0 away rout of his former side Al-Arabi.

==== Al-Ula ====
On 8 July 2026, after achieving promotion to the top flight with Al-Faisaly, Quioto joined second-tier side Al-Ula.

== International career ==
He earned his first cap for Honduras on 29 February 2012 in a friendly match against Ecuador. Quioto represented Honduras at the 2016 Summer Olympics and made 6 appearances and scored 1 goal, helping Honduras finish 4th. He scored his first senior team goal on 10 February 2016, a 1–3 loss to Guatemala in a friendly. On 10 October 2017, Quioto scored the winning goal against Mexico in the last match of 2018 World Cup Qualifiers which sent the Hondurans to the Inter-Continental Playoff where they lost to Australia.

On 15 October 2025, following a 3–0 win against Haiti — in which he scored once — Quioto entered the list of the national team's all-time top scorers, moving past historic player David Suazo and equaling Eduardo Bennett.

On 19 November 2025, the day after Honduras disastrously failed to qualify for the 2026 FIFA World Cup, Quioto retired from the national team following Honduras' goalless draw against Costa Rica.

== Personal life ==
On 22 June 2018, Quioto received his US Green Card, qualifying him as a domestic player for MLS roster purposes.

== Career statistics ==
=== Club ===
As of match played 30 March 2026

Appearances and goals by club, season and competition
Club	Season	League			National cup (Note: Includes Polish Cup, U.S. Open Cup, Canadian Championship, King's Cup)		Continental		Other		Total	
Club	Season	Division	Apps	Goals	Apps	Goals	Apps	Goals	Apps	Goals	Apps	Goals
Vida	2009–10	Liga Nacional	9	2	—		—		—		9	2
Vida	2010–11	Liga Nacional	15	1	—		—		—		15	1
Vida	2011–12	Liga Nacional	23	8	—		—		—		23	8
Vida	2012–13	Liga Nacional	13	2	—		—		—		13	2
Vida	2013–14	Liga Nacional	16	6	—		—		—		16	6
Vida	Total		76	19	—		—		—		76	19
Wisła Kraków (loan)	2012–13	Ekstraklasa	9	0	2	0	—		—		11	0
Olimpia	2013–14	Liga Nacional	19	5	—		—		—		19	5
Olimpia	2014–15	Liga Nacional	35	17	—		5 (Note: Appearances in CONCACAF Champions League)	2	—		40	19
Olimpia	2015–16	Liga Nacional	30	9	—		3	0	—		33	9
Olimpia	2016–17	Liga Nacional	12	7	—		2	2	—		14	9
Olimpia	Total		96	38	2	0	10	4	—		117	42
Houston Dynamo	2017	MLS	22	7	0	0	—		4 (Note: Appearance(s) in MLS Cup Playoffs)	0	26	7
Houston Dynamo	2018	MLS	32	6	4	2	—		—		36	8
Houston Dynamo	2019	MLS	18	2	0	0	4	0	1 (Note: Appearance in Leagues Cup)	0	23	2
Houston Dynamo	Total		72	15	4	2	4	0	5	0	85	17
CF Montréal	2020	MLS	19	8	—		4	1	2 (Note: One ppearance in MLS is Back Tournament knockout stage, one appearance in MLS Cup Playoffs)	0	25	10
CF Montréal	2021	MLS	19	8	1	1	—		—		20	9
CF Montréal	2022	MLS	30	15	1	0	3	1	1	0	35	16
CF Montréal	2023	MLS	13	3	1	0	—		—		14	3
CF Montréal	Total		81	34	3	1	7	2	3	1	94	38
Tractor	2023–24	Persian Gulf Pro League	0	0	0	0	—		—		0	0
Al-Arabi	2023–24	Saudi First Division League	13	10	—		—		—		13	10
Al-Arabi	2024–25	Saudi First Division League	28	13	2	2	—		—		30	15
Al-Arabi	Total		41	23	2	2	—		—		43	25
Al-Najma	2025–26	Saudi Pro League	9	0	1	0	—		—		10	0
Al-Faisaly	2025–26	Saudi First Division League	17	11	—		—		—		17	11
Career total			392	140	12	5	21	6	8	1	442	152

=== International ===
Appearances and goals by national team and year
National team	Year	Apps	Goals
Honduras	2012	1	0
Honduras	2014	7	0
Honduras	2015	8	0
Honduras	2016	11	4
Honduras	2017	13	3
Honduras	2018	3	1
Honduras	2019	4	0
Honduras	2021	7	4
Honduras	2022	9	1
Honduras	2023	4	1
Honduras	2024	0	0
Honduras	2025	15	5
Total		82	19

Scores and results list Honduras' goal tally first, score column indicates score after each Quioto goal.

List of international goals scored by Romell Quioto
No.	Date	Venue	Opponent	Score	Result	Competition
1	10 February 2016	Estadio Mateo Flores, Guatemala City, Guatemala	Guatemala	1–0	1–3	Friendly
2	29 March 2016	Estadio Olímpico Metropolitano, San Pedro Sula, Honduras	El Salvador	2–0	2–0	2018 FIFA World Cup qualification
3	2 September 2016	Estadio Olímpico Metropolitano, San Pedro Sula, Honduras	Canada	2–1	2–1	2018 FIFA World Cup qualification
4	15 November 2016	Estadio Olímpico Metropolitano, San Pedro Sula, Honduras	Trinidad and Tobago	1–0	3–1	2018 FIFA World Cup qualification
5	13 June 2017	Estadio Rommel Fernandez, Panama City, Panama	Panama	1–0	2–2	2018 FIFA World Cup qualification
6	5 September 2017	Estadio Olímpico Metropolitano, San Pedro Sula, Honduras	United States	1–0	1–1	2018 FIFA World Cup qualification
7	10 October 2017	Estadio Olímpico Metropolitano, San Pedro Sula, Honduras	Mexico	3–2	3–2	2018 FIFA World Cup qualification
8	11 October 2018	Estadi Olímpic Lluís Companys, Barcelona, Spain	United Arab Emirates	1–0	1–1	Friendly
9	13 July 2021	BBVA Stadium, Houston, United States	Grenada	4–0	4–0	2021 CONCACAF Gold Cup
10	17 July 2021	BBVA Stadium, Houston, United States	Panama	1–0	3–2	2021 CONCACAF Gold Cup
11	17 July 2021	BBVA Stadium, Houston, United States	Panama	3–2	3–2	2021 CONCACAF Gold Cup
12	16 November 2021	Estadio Nacional, San José, Costa Rica	Costa Rica	1–1	1–2	2022 FIFA World Cup qualification
13	6 June 2022	Estadio Olímpico Metropolitano, San Pedro Sula, Honduras	Curaçao	1–2	1–2	2022–23 CONCACAF Nations League A
14	15 October 2023	Estadio Nacional Chelato Uclés, Tegucigalpa, Honduras	Cuba	3–0	4–0	2023–24 CONCACAF Nations League A
15	21 March 2025	Bermuda National Stadium, Devonshire Parish, Bermuda	Bermuda	1–2	5–3	2025 CONCACAF Gold Cup qualification
16	21 March 2025	Bermuda National Stadium, Devonshire Parish, Bermuda	Bermuda	3–2	5–3	2025 CONCACAF Gold Cup qualification
17	21 June 2025	Shell Energy Stadium, Houston, United States	El Salvador	1–0	2–0	2025 CONCACAF Gold Cup
18	10 September 2025	Estadio Nacional Chelato Uclés, Tegucigalpa, Honduras	Nicaragua	1–0	2–0	2026 FIFA World Cup qualification
19	13 October 2025	Estadio Nacional Chelato Uclés, Tegucigalpa, Honduras	Haiti	3–0	3–0	2026 FIFA World Cup qualification

== Honours ==
Olimpia

- Liga Nacional: 2014 Clausura, 2015 Clausura, 2016 Clausura
- Honduran Cup: 2015
- Supercopa de Honduras: 2016 Clausura

Houston Dynamo

- U.S. Open Cup: 2018

CF Montréal

- Canadian Championship: 2021

Individual

- Montreal Impact MVP: 2020
