= 2016 Honduran Supercup (July) =

Honduras Progreso	Olimpia
3	3
- Olimpia won 5–4 on penalty shoot-outs
- Date: 8 July 2016
- Venue: Estadio Humberto Micheletti, El Progreso
- Referee: Melissa Borjas

The 2016 Honduran Supercup was a match arranged by the Honduran Liga Nacional which took place on 8 July 2016 between C.D. Honduras Progreso, winners of the 2015–16 Liga Nacional (Apertura tournament) and Club Deportivo Olimpia, winners of the 2015 Honduran Cup. This was the first Honduran Supercup since 1999 after the 2015 edition was abandoned with no disclosed reason.

== Qualified teams ==
Team	Method of qualification	Appearances
Honduras Progreso	Winners of 2015–16 Honduran Liga Nacional (Apertura)	1st
Olimpia	Winners of 2015 Honduran Cup	2nd

== Background ==
C.D. Honduras Progreso qualified as reigning champions of the 2015–16 Honduran Liga Nacional (Apertura); meanwhile Club Deportivo Olimpia entered as the 2015 Honduran Cup winners. Honduras Progreso defeated C.D. Motagua in the Apertura finals on penalty shoot-outs after a 4–4 aggregated score. Olimpia was crowned as Cup winners after a convincingly 3–1 over Platense F.C. in the final match.

The previous match between both sides ended with a 2–2 draw at Estadio Tiburcio Carías Andino on 20 March 2016 for a league encounter.

== Match ==
On a mostly cloudy night, the game started at 19:15 CST as scheduled. It was the first time in Honduran football that a game was officiated by female referees at a professional level. Both teams entered the field with their alternate uniforms. C.D. Honduras Progreso's attacker Ángel Tejeda scored first with a penalty kick at the 26th minute after Club Deportivo Olimpia's defender Bryan Johnson committed a foul inside the 18-yard box. In the second half, Olimpia made three consecutive goals at the 52nd, 57th and 65th minutes, scored by Carlo Costly, José Fonseca and Bryan Johnson respectively. Johny Gómez scored the 2–3 for Honduras Progreso at the 69th minute and Nixon Duarte tied the game at the 73rd before the end of regulation. The match went straight to penalty shoot-outs where Olimpia won 5–4. During the shoot-outs, Jorge Cardona's kick went so wide and high he sent the ball outside the stadium.

8 July 2016
19:15 CST

Honduras Progreso	3–3	Olimpia
Tejeda 26' (pen.); Gómez 69'; Duarte 73'		52' Costly; 57' Fonseca; 65' Johnson
Penalties
Alvarado (penalty missed); Bermúdez (penalty scored); Sánchez (penalty scored); Acevedo (penalty scored); Tejeda (penalty scored); Smith (penalty missed); Cardona (penalty missed)	4–5	(penalty scored) Mejía; (penalty scored) Rodas; (penalty scored) Güity; (penalty missed) Tobías; (penalty scored) Johnson; (penalty missed) Fonseca; (penalty scored) Estupiñán

El Progreso, Yoro
Estadio Humberto Micheletti
Referee: Melissa Borjas

Honduras Progreso	Olimpia

GK	27	(Belize) Woodrow West
DF	1	(Honduras) Pastor Martínez
DF	17	(Honduras) Dílmer Gutiérrez
DF	21	(Costa Rica) Roy Smith
DF	22	(Honduras) Nixon Duarte
DF	31	(Honduras) Carlos Sánchez
MF	6	(Honduras) Juan Delgado	(substituted off) 78'
MF	11	(Honduras) Víctor Moncada
MF	16	(Honduras) Johny Gómez	(substituted off) 75'
FW	13	(Honduras) Ángel Tejeda
FW	35	(Honduras) Frédixon Elvir	(substituted off) 65'
Substitutions:
MF	8	(Honduras) Jorge Cardona	(substituted on) 65'
DF	2	(Honduras) Johny Rivera	(substituted on) 75'
MF	12	(Honduras) Mariano Acevedo	(substituted on) 78'
Manager:
(Honduras) Héctor Castellón

GK	28	(Honduras) Donis Escober
DF	3	(Honduras) Elmer Güity
DF	12	(Honduras) Bryan Johnson
DF	14	(Honduras) José Fonseca
DF	19	(Honduras) José Tobías
MF	6	(Honduras) David Meza	(substituted off) 67'
MF	7	(Honduras) Carlos Mejía
MF	10	(Honduras) Bayron Méndez	(substituted off) 73'
MF	20	(Honduras) Óliver Morazán	(substituted off) 82'
MF	24	(Honduras) Mayron Flores	(substituted off) 37'
FW	13	(Honduras) Carlo Costly	(substituted off) 75'
Substitutions:
FW	18	(Colombia) Javier Estupiñán	(substituted on) 37'
MF	29	(Honduras) German Mejía	(substituted on) 67'
MF	16	(Honduras) Gerson Rodas	(substituted on) 73'
FW	25	(Honduras) Jorge Bengoché	(substituted on) 75'
MF	38	(Honduras) Carlos Pineda	(substituted on) 82'
Manager:
(Argentina) Héctor Vargas

== See also ==
- 2016–17 Honduran Liga Nacional
- 2016–17 Honduran Cup
