= José María Durón =

Honduran footballer (born 1952)

Personal information
- Full name: José María Durón Ruiz
- Date of birth: 1952 (age 73–74)
- Place of birth: Tegucigalpa, Francisco Morazán, Honduras
- Position: Defender

Senior career*
Years	Team	Apps	(Gls)
1971–1983	Motagua		(2)

International career
1972–1973	Honduras	4	(0)
- * Club domestic league appearances and goals

José María Durón Ruiz (born 1952) is a retired Honduran football player and manager. Nicknamed "Chema", he played for Motagua throughout his entire career spanning from the 1970s to the early 1980s. He also represented Honduras for the 1973 CONCACAF Championship.

== Club career ==
Durón made his debut during the 1971–72 Honduran Liga Nacional for Motagua where he notably scored one of two goals in the away match against Troya on 29 August 1971 which ended in a 2–0 victory. Despite the club having a rough start around this time, Durón was part of the Motagua squad that won the 1973–74 Honduran Liga Nacional. Despite the Aguilas having a strong roster throughout the 1970s, Real España maintained a foothold on the top-flight throughout the majority of the 1970s with Motagua returning to achieve their third title in the decade following the 1978–79 Honduran Liga Nacional. Durón later scored his second and final goal for the club during a 1–1 draw against Marathón in a home match on 2 September 1981. He played for an additional season before his retirement following the 1982–83 Honduran Liga Nacional as the club's captain.

== International career ==
Durón represented Honduras for the 1973 CONCACAF Championship, making 4 appearances throughout the tournament.

== Managerial career ==
Throughout the early 2010s, Durón worked within youth football in order to develop future talents for Honduras. He then briefly managed Juticalpa as an interim manager following Jorge Pineda getting fired from the club due to poor performance. He later served in the reserves in throughout the 2017–18 season, winning the title by the end.

== Personal life ==
At some point, Durón suffered from a lumbar problem and later operated on, causing movement problems for him and having to be taken care of in his sister's house. During the COVID-19 pandemic, it was revealed he had further knee problems with most of the operation funds being provided by his former club of Motagua.
