= San Marcos, Ocotepeque =

San Marcos
- Municipality
- Location within Honduras
- Coordinates: 14°24′N 88°57′W
- Country: Honduras
- Department: Ocotepeque
- Villages: 14

Area
  - Municipality: 169 km^{2} (65 sq mi)

Population (2020 projection)
  - Municipality: 22,598
  - Density: 134/km^{2} (346/sq mi)
  - Urban: 7,754
- Postal code: 43201

San Marcos is a town, with a population of 6,836 (2013 census), and a municipality in the Honduran department of Ocotepeque.

This municipality of 22,000 people is located in Western Honduras bordering Guatemala and El Salvador. It's situated between the highest point in Honduras, Mount Meredon, and the Rio Grande and Suntulin Rivers. It was founded by Spanish and Belgian gold miners. San Marcos de Ocotepeque is a bustle of cultural activity ranging from plays to literary events.

== Demographics ==
At the time of the 2013 Honduras census, San Marcos municipality had a population of 19,978. Of these, 98.27% were Mestizo, 0.89% White, 0.50% Indigenous, 0.30% Black or Afro-Honduran and 0.05% others.

== Sources ==
- Honduras Coffee
- Honduran Specialty Coffee
