= 2014–15 Honduran Liga Nacional de Ascenso =

Liga de Ascenso
- Season: 2014–15
- Champions: Apertura: Juticalpa; Clausura: Juticalpa
- Promoted: Juticalpa
- All statistics correct as of 31 May 2015.

The 2014–15 Honduran Liga Nacional de Ascenso was the 48th season of the Second level in Honduran football and the 13th under the name Liga Nacional de Ascenso. Under the management of Roger Espinoza, Juticalpa F.C. won the tournament after winning both the Apertura and Clausura seasons and obtained automatic promotion to the 2015–16 Honduran Liga Nacional.

== Promotion ==
As winners of both Apertura and Clausura, Juticalpa F.C. obtained automatic promotion to 2015–16 Honduran Liga Nacional and no promotion series was required.
