= Hilder Colón =

Honduran footballer

Hilder Jobany Colón Alvarez is a Honduran professional footballer. He represented Honduras in the football competition at the 2012 Summer Olympics.
