= Bruno Foliados =

Uruguayan footballer (born 1992)

Personal information
- Full name: Bruno Foliados Suárez
- Date of birth: 17 January 1992 (age 34)
- Place of birth: Montevideo, Uruguay
- Height: 1.70 m (5 ft 7 in)
- Positions: Winger; forward

Team information
- Current team: Cerro

Youth career
- Defensor Sporting

Senior career*
Years	Team	Apps	(Gls)
2013–2014	Defensor Sporting	1	(0)
2013	→ Toledo (loan)	5	(0)
2014–2015	Boston River	19	(4)
2015	Sud América	7	(0)
2016	Real España	13	(0)
2016–2019	Boston River	62	(7)
2020	Deportivo Cuenca	7	(1)
2020	Cerro Largo	9	(0)
2021–	Cerro	2	(0)
- * Club domestic league appearances and goals as of 15:34, 6 July 2021 (UTC)

Bruno Foliados Suárez (born 17 January 1992) is a Uruguayan professional footballer who plays as a winger or forward for Uruguayan club Cerro.

== Career ==
In 2014, Foliados signed for Uruguayan second division club Boston River, where he made 19 league appearances and scored 4 goals. On 13 September 2014, he debuted for Boston River in a 2–0 win over Plaza Colonia. On 5 October 2014, Foliados scored his first goal for Boston River in a 1–1 draw with Rocha.

Before the second half of the 2015–16 season, Foliados signed for Honduran team Real España.

Before the 2020 season, Foliados signed for Deportivo Cuenca in Ecuador, where he suffered a skull fracture.
