= Marvin Bernárdez =

Honduran footballer (born 1995)

Personal information
- Full name: Marvin Javier Bernárdez García
- Date of birth: 5 February 1995 (age 31)
- Place of birth: La Ceiba, Honduras
- Height: 1.77 m (5 ft 10 in)
- Position: Winger

Team information
- Current team: Vida
- Number: 31

Senior career*
Years	Team	Apps	(Gls)
2014–2020	Vida	94	(5)
2020–2021	Olimpia	20	(1)
2021–	Vida	54	(4)
- * Club domestic league appearances and goals

Marvin Javier Bernárdez García (born 5 February 1995) is a Honduran professional footballer who plays as a winger for Vida in the Liga Nacional de Fútbol Profesional de Honduras
