= Éder Munive =

Colombian footballer (born 1989)

Personal information
- Full name: Éder Daniel Munive Royero
- Date of birth: 17 September 1989 (age 37)
- Place of birth: Valledupar, Colombia
- Height: 1.88 m (6 ft 2 in)
- Position: Defender

Team information
- Current team: Unión Magdalena
- Number: 4

Youth career
- Envigado

Senior career*
Years	Team	Apps	(Gls)
2009–2013	Envigado	67	(3)
2014	Malacateco	18	(0)
2015	Walter Ferretti	30	(4)
2016	Marathón	29	(1)
2017–2018	Walter Ferretti	57	(10)
2019–2021	Leones	30	(13)
2021	Atlético Huila	12	(2)
2022	Unión Comercio	12	(0)
2023–	Unión Magdalena	15	(0)
- * Club domestic league appearances and goals as of 1 January 2024

Éder Daniel Munive Royero (born 17 September 1989 in Valledupar, Colombia) is a Colombian professional footballer who plays as a defender for Colombian Categoría Primera B club Unión Magdalena.
