= San Juan de Flores =

Cantarranas
- Municipality
- Nickname: Cantarranas
- Location in Honduras
- Coordinates: 14°16′N 87°02′W
- Country: Honduras
- Department: Francisco Morazán

Area
  - Total: 392 km^{2} (151 sq mi)

Population (2015)
  - Total: 16,070
  - Density: 41.0/km^{2} (106/sq mi)

Cantarranas is a municipality in the Honduran department of Francisco Morazán.

It is also known as Cantaranas (or Singing Frogs in English) and is located approximately 55 minutes north of the capital, Tegucigalpa and about 20 minutes away from Valle de Angeles.

== Annual Events ==
- Festival de Alimentos tradicionales en vías de extinción(Food festival - food near extinction)

Includes all typical/traditional Honduran food. The Food Festival is organized in April of each year.
