= Coyoles Central =

- Location within Honduras
- Coordinates: 15°24′00″N 86°40′00″W
- Country: Honduras
- Department: Yoro
- Municipality: Olanchito

Government
  - Type: Democratic Municipality
  - Mayor of Olanchito: José Tomás Ponce Posas (Libre)
- Elevation: 199 m (653 ft)

Population (2006-01-17)
  - Total: 1,144
- Time zone: UTC-6 (Central America)

Coyoles Central is a village in the municipality of Olanchito in Honduras. It is located in the department of Yoro, in the central part of Honduras, 160 km north of the capital Tegucigalpa. Coyoles Central initially served as a company town for workers of Standard Fruit Company, and was one of the principle settings in the book Prisión Verde, by Ramón Amaya Amador.

Coyoles Central is 199 meters above sea level and the population is 1144. The terrain around Coyoles Central is varied. (Note: Calculated from the variance of all elevation data (DEM 3 ") from Viewfinder Panoramas, within 10 km radius.) The highest point nearby is 1253 meters above sea level, 6.6 km south of Coyoles Central. (Note: Elevation data from Viewfinder Panoramas.) Around Coyoles Central, the terrain is quite sparsely populated, with 22 inhabitants per square kilometer. The closest major community is Olanchito, 13.4 km northeast of Coyoles Central. The surroundings around Coyoles Central are a mosaic of farmland and natural vegetation.

The region is characterized by a Savanna climate. Average annual temperature is 22 °C. The warmest month is May, when the average temperature is 24 °C, and the coldest is November, with 20 °C. Average annual precipitation is 1599 millimeters. The rainiest month is September, with an average 213 mm precipitation, and the driest is February, with an average 38 mm precipitation.

Climate data for Coyoles Central
Month	Jan	Feb	Mar	Apr	May	Jun	Jul	Aug	Sep	Oct	Nov	Dec	Year
Mean daily maximum °C (°F)	24 (75)	26 (79)	28 (82)	29 (84)	29 (84)	26 (79)	24 (75)	26 (79)	27 (81)	24 (75)	22 (72)	23 (73)	26 (79)
Mean daily minimum °C (°F)	16 (61)	17 (63)	18 (64)	18 (64)	20 (68)	20 (68)	19 (66)	18 (64)	18 (64)	19 (66)	17 (63)	17 (63)	18 (64)
Average precipitation mm (inches)	105 (4.1)	38 (1.5)	75 (3.0)	42 (1.7)	161 (6.3)	192 (7.6)	130 (5.1)	213 (8.4)	213 (8.4)	195 (7.7)	193 (7.6)	42 (1.7)	1,599 (63.0)

== Notable people ==
- Moisés Canelo distinguished himself when young by singing in the banana fields of Coyoles Central. This provided the initial basis for his career as a famous Honduran singer and songwriter.
