= Josimar (footballer, born 1988) =

Brazilian footballer

Personal information
- Full name: Josimar Moreira Matos de Souza
- Date of birth: 7 July 1988 (age 38)
- Place of birth: Cruzeiro do Sul, Brazil
- Height: 1.95 m (6 ft 5 in)
- Position: Forward

Senior career*
Years	Team	Apps	(Gls)
2008–2010	Cruzeiro		
2011	Grêmio Coariense		
2011–2012	Rio Negro		
2012	Confiança		
2013	Salgueiro		
2014	Auto Esporte	12	(9)
2014	Bragantino	1	(0)
2014	Central	2	(0)
2015	Parrillas One	13	(3)
2015	FAS	21	(9)
2015–2016	Marathón		
2017	Sonsonate		
- * Club domestic league appearances and goals

Josimar Moreira Matos de Souza (born 7 July 1988), commonly known as Josimar, is a Brazilian professional footballer who played as a forward.
