= Juticalpa F.C. =

Honduran football club

Juticalpa
- Full name: Juticalpa Fútbol Club S.A.D.
- Nicknames: Canecheros, Juticalpenses, Verdes, Verde del Oriente, Juti-Juti, El Equipo de todos los Olanchanos.
- Founded: 14 August 2004; 22 years ago
- Ground: Estadio Juan Ramón Brevé Vargas; Juticalpa, Honduras
- Capacity: 20,000
- Manager: Nerlin Membreño
- League: Liga Nacional de Ascenso
- 2018–19: Liga Nacional, 9th (relegated)
Home colours	Away colours	Third colours

Juticalpa Fútbol Club is a Honduran football club, based in Juticalpa, Honduras.

Nicknamed Los Canecheros, they currently play in the Honduran second division. Their home venue is the currently renovated and expanded Estadio Juan Ramón Brevé Vargas.

== Achievements ==
- Honduran Cup
  - Winners (1): 2015–16
- Honduran Supercup
  - Runners-up (1): 2016
- Liga de Ascenso
  - Winners (3): 2012–13 A, 2014–15 A, 2014–15 C
  - Runners-up (2): 2005–06 A, 2013–14 C

== Current squad ==
Note: Flags indicate national team as defined under FIFA eligibility rules; some limited exceptions apply. Players may hold more than one non-FIFA nationality.

No.	Pos.	Nation	Player
1	GK	HON	Denovan Torres
3	MF	HON	Yair Medrano
4	MF	HON	Kelvin Matute
6	DF	HON	Junior García
7	FW	HON	Aldo Fajardo
9	FW	HON	Josué Villafranca
10	MF	HON	Marcelo Canales
11	FW	COL	Luis Hurtado
12	DF	HON	Leonel Casildo
13	FW	HON	Shalton González
15	MF	HON	Norman Gaboriell
16	MF	HON	Yervis Gutiérrez
17	MF	HON	Messy Cerrato
18	FW	HON	Júnior Lacayo
19	MF	ARG	Ilan Rappoport
20	DF	HON	Roger González

No.	Pos.	Nation	Player
21	MF	HON	Luis Garrido
23	MF	HON	Héctor Castellanos
24	DF	URU	Fabricio Silva
25	DF	HON	David Mendoza
27	DF	HON	Wisdom Quaye
28	DF	HON	Axel Gómez
30	MF	HON	Juan Josué Rodríguez
31	GK	HON	Cesar Calix
33	DF	HON	Fabricio Galindo
34	FW	ARG	Diego Ledesma
35	GK	COL	Sebastián Alzáte
37	FW	HON	Oscar Mendoza
38	FW	HON	Rodrigo Rodríguez
39	MF	HON	Johan Centeno
45	MF	HON	Jorge Velasquez
51	DF	HON	Klifox Bernárdez

== League and cups performance ==
Regular season			Postseason		Others		
Season	Finish	Record	Finish	Record	Cup	Supercup	International
2015–16 A	8th	6–4–8 (19:22)	Didn't enter		Winners	Didn't enter	
2015–16 C	5th	8–4–6 (25:22)	Playoffs	1–0–1 (1:3)	Winners	Didn't enter	
2016–17 A	8th	3–9–6 (24:26)	Didn't enter		Round of 16	Runners-up	Didn't enter
2016–17 C	9th	2–5–11 (23:37)	Didn't enter		Round of 16	Runners-up	Didn't enter
2017–18 A	5th	8–4–6 (39:30)	Playoffs	0–0–2 (2:5)	Not held	Didn't enter	Didn't enter
2017–18 C	9th	5–2–11 (25:32)	Didn't enter		Not held	Didn't enter	Didn't enter
2018–19 A	9th	3–6–9 (19:34)	Didn't enter		Round of 16	Didn't enter	Didn't enter
2018–19 C	8th	2–10–6 (20:33)	Relegated	0–0–2 (3:6)	Round of 16	Didn't enter	Didn't enter

== List of coaches ==
- (Colombia) Jairo Rios
- (Honduras) Roger Espinoza (2012–2015)
- (Honduras) Emilio Umanzor (2015–2016)
- (Honduras) Wilmer Cruz (2016)
- (Honduras) Jorge Pineda (2016–2017)
- (Honduras) José María Durón (Interim) (2017)
- (Honduras) Mauro Reyes (2017–2018)
- (Honduras) Ramon Maradiaga (2018)
- (Honduras) Hector Castellon (2018)
- (Uruguay) Robert Lima (2019)
- (Honduras) Wilmer Cruz (2019)
- (Honduras) Danilo Turcios (2019–2020)
- (Honduras) Raúl Cáceres (2020–2021)
- (Honduras) Róger Espinoza (2021)
- (Honduras) Nerlin Membreño (2022)
- (Honduras) Carlos Padilla (2023)
- (Honduras) Mauro Reyes (2023)
- (Honduras) Humberto Rivera (2023)
- (Honduras) Nerlin Membreño (2024
- (Uruguay) Fernando Araújo (2024–Present)
