= Brayan Velásquez =

Honduran footballer (born 1996)

Brayan Velasquez Garcia (born 8 May 1996) is a Honduran professional footballer who plays as a forward. He has represented Honduras at the 2013 FIFA U-17 World Cup.

== Club career ==
In August 2014, Velásquez made his professional debut with Club Deportivo Olimpia.

In February 2016, Velásquez was loan to Lobos UPNFM.

In 2017, Velásquez was loan to Juticalpa F.C.

== International career ==
In 2013, Velasquez represented Honduras at the FIFA U-17 World Cup where he played all matches. Honduras only made it to the quarter finals. Velasquez had two goals and one assist.
