= Estadio Juan Ramón Brevé Vargas =

Coordinates: 14.65857°N 86.21630°W

Juan Ramón Brevé Vargas
- Interactive map of Juan Ramón Brevé Vargas
- Full name: Estadio Juan Ramón Brevé Vargas
- Location: Juticalpa, Honduras
- Owner: Juticalpa Municipality
- Capacity: 20,000
- Surface: GrassMaster
- Field size: 100 x 65 m

Construction
- Groundbreaking: 2008
- Built: 2008–2015
- Opened: 12 July 2015; 11 years ago
- Cost: L40,000,000.00
- Architect: Fernando Zaldívar

Tenants
- Juticalpa F.C. Olancho FC

Estadio Juan Ramón Brevé Vargas is a soccer venue in Juticalpa, Olancho, Honduras. It is the headquarters of Juticalpa F.C. and Olancho FC, both of the Honduran Liga Nacional. It was inaugurated in July 2015.

== First game ==
The first official game was played on Sunday 9 August 2015 between hosts Juticalpa F.C. and Real C.D. España for the game week two of the 2015–16 Honduran Liga Nacional season. The match ended with a 2–0 victory for the home team. The first official goal was scored by Real España's defender Wilfredo Barahona in his own net. It was also Juticalpa's first ever game in first division.

9 August 2015
14:00 (UTC−06:00)
Week 2

Juticalpa	2–0	Real España
Barahona 28' (o.g.); Ocampo 76'	Report

Estadio Juan Ramón Brevé Vargas
Attendance: 5,058
Referee: Nelson Salgado

== First hat-trick ==
On 18 August 2016, Juticalpa F.C.'s midfielder Carlos Lanza became the first player to score a hat-trick at Estadio Juan Ramón Brevé Vargas in the 3–1 home team's victory over C.D. Social Sol.
