= Honduran Supercup =

- Founded: 1997; 29 years ago
- Abolished: 2019
- Region: Honduras
- Teams: 2
- Last champions: Marathón (1st title)
- Most championships: Olimpia (3)
- 2026

The Honduran Supercup is a Honduran football competition held yearly as a preseason match between the reigning champions of the Liga Nacional and the Honduran Cup. The competition started unofficially in 1997, but was discontinued after just two seasons. In 2015, it was intended to be reactivated, but the match between F.C. Motagua and Club Deportivo Olimpia was scheduled but not played. One year later, a new Supercup edition was finally reestablished after 17 years of dormancy. The Honduran football authorities however, did not consider the competition official until 2017.

== Winners ==
Year	Winners	Score	Runners-up	Venue
Unofficial editions
1997	Olimpia	1–0	Platense	Estadio Francisco Morazán
1999	Motagua	1–0	Platense	Estadio Tiburcio Carías Andino
2015	Motagua v Olimpia (abandoned)			Estadio Juan Ramón Brevé Vargas
2016 I	Olimpia	3–3 (5–4 pen.)	Honduras Progreso	Estadio Humberto Micheletti
2016 II	Olimpia	3–0	Juticalpa	Estadio Juan Ramón Brevé Vargas
Official editions
2017	Motagua	2–1	Marathón	Estadio Francisco Morazán
2019	Marathón	0–0 (4–2 pen.)	Platense	Estadio Carlos Miranda

== Titles by club ==
Rank	Club	Champions	Runners-up	Winning years
1	Olimpia	3	0	1997, 2016, 2016
2	Motagua	2	0	1999, 2017
3	Marathón	1	1	2019
4	Platense	0	3	—
5	Honduras Progreso	0	1	—
6	Juticalpa	0	1	—

== Re-launch ==
In January 2015, the Honduran Secretary of State for Culture, Arts and Sports gathered with the Honduran League to discuss a possible reactivation of the competition in 2016. An official Super Cup has not been played since 1999.

== Other versions ==
In 2014 and 2016, there were three exhibition versions of the tournament re-branded as Supercopa Diez, sponsored by local daily sports newspaper Diario Deportivo Diez. These unofficial editions faced the champions of the Liga Nacional against the champions of the Liga de Ascenso.

Year	Champion	Result	Runner up
2014	Honduras Progreso	2–1	Real España
2014	Olimpia	1–1	Honduras Progreso
2016	Honduras Progreso	2–1	Social Sol

== See also ==
- Honduran League
- Honduran Cup
