= 2011–12 Honduran Liga Nacional =

Liga Nacional
- Season: 2011–12
- Champions: Apertura: Olimpia; Clausura: Olimpia
- Relegated: Platense
- Champions League: Olimpia; Marathón
- Matches: 180
- Goals: 441 (2.45 per match)
- Top goalscorer: Apertura: Cardozo (15); Clausura: Torlacoff (9)
- Biggest home win: Olimpia 7–2 Deportes Savio (21 March 2012)
- Biggest away win: Deportes Savio 2–5 Real España (4 March 2012)
- Highest scoring: Olimpia 7–2 Deportes Savio (21 March 2012)
- Longest unbeaten run: Motagua (23)
- Longest losing run: Necaxa (5)

The 2011–12 season in Honduran Liga Nacional was divided into two tournaments (Apertura and Clausura) and determined the 59th and 60th champions in the history of the league. It also provided two berths for the 2012–13 CONCACAF Champions League. The Apertura tournament was played in the second half of 2011, while the Clausura was played in the first half of 2012. A new change in the system was used for this season; unlike previous years, 6 teams qualified to the final round, matching team 3rd vs team 6th and team 4th vs team 5th, those who advanced played the semifinals against 1st and 2nd.

== 2011–12 teams ==
On 18 June 2011, Atlético Choloma obtained promotion to the 2011–12 season and replaced Hispano F.C.

Location of teams in 2011–12 season

Atlético Choloma	Deportes Savio	Marathón	Motagua	Necaxa
Olimpia	Platense	Real España	Victoria	Vida

- C.D. Necaxa is from Tegucigalpa but will play their home games at Choluteca.

== Apertura ==
The Apertura tournament was scheduled to be played from August to December 2011. The regular-season fixture was announced on 21 July 2011 and as with the previous season C.D.S. Vida and Real C.D. España played the inaugural match on 6 August in La Ceiba, ending in a 1–1 draw. In round 14, C.D. Marathón defeated Real España 2–0 in the Clásico Sampedrano and ensured its participation in the final round reaching 27 points; meanwhile, Real España qualified to the postseason in Round 15, thanks to its 2–0 home victory over Atlético Choloma. On 6 November, Club Deportivo Olimpia defeated Marathón 1–0 at Estadio Tiburcio Carías Andino and became the third club to guarantee a spot in the final round. After round 17, Real España and Marathón had not only qualified to the final round but ensured their participation in the semifinals; also Vida and Deportes Savio got in the postseason after their draws against Olimpia and Real España respectively. Round 17 also defined the elimination of Atlético Choloma. And in the very last round, C.D. Necaxa became the last team to advance to the postseason by defeating Olimpia 0–1 at Tegucigalpa. C.D. Motagua, C.D. Platense and C.D. Victoria were eliminated.

Deportes Savio and Necaxa, two teams which had never qualified to a postseason before, made it to the second round. The brackets paired Olimpia (3rd) versus Necaxa (6th) and Vida (4th) versus Deportes Savio (5th). Olimpia got the ticket to the semifinals with a 2–1 victory over Necaxa; meanwhile the series between Vida and Deportes Savio was decided in a coin flipping, due to a 3–3 aggregated score; both teams were also tied in the regular season with a 2–0 home win by each side; Vida advanced after the draw performed by the league's board of directors on 27 November 2011.

Once in the semifinals, Real España got rid of Vida with a 5–1 aggregated score and played the final against Olimpia, who eliminated Marathón for the second consecutive time in a semifinal series. On 17 December 2011, Olimpia obtained its 24th league title after defeating Real España with a 3–0 aggregate score; midfielder Carlos Will Mejía was the hero of the series scoring all three goals.

=== Regular season ===
==== Standings ====
Pos	Team	Pld	W	D	L	GF	GA	GD	Pts	Qualification or relegation
1	Real España	18	9	7	2	25	13	+12	34	Qualification to the Semifinals
2	Marathón	18	9	4	5	32	19	+13	31	Qualification to the Semifinals
3	Olimpia	18	7	5	6	16	11	+5	26	Qualification to the Second round
4	Vida	18	7	5	6	19	21	−2	26	Qualification to the Second round
5	Deportes Savio	18	6	6	6	22	25	−3	24	Qualification to the Second round
6	Necaxa	18	6	5	7	16	20	−4	23	Qualification to the Second round
7	Motagua	18	6	4	8	20	19	+1	22	
8	Platense	18	6	3	9	14	23	−9	21	
9	Victoria	18	5	4	9	21	25	−4	19	
10	Atlético Choloma	18	3	9	6	18	27	−9	18	

Updated to match(es) played on 19 November 2011. Source:

==== Results ====
As of 19 November 2011

Home \ Away	ACH	SAV	MAR	MOT	NEC	OLI	PLA	RES	VIC	VID
Atlético Choloma		2–2	3–1	1–1	0–1	1–0	3–1	1–4	1–1	1–1
Deportes Savio	3–1		1–1	0–3	1–2	0–0	2–0	1–1	2–0	2–0
Marathón	1–1	5–0		2–1	3–0	0–2	1–0	2–0	3–2	1–2
Motagua	0–0	2–1	1–4		1–1	0–1	2–0	0–2	3–0	3–0
Necaxa	0–0	1–2	1–0	1–0		0–0	1–1	1–3	1–0	0–1
Olimpia	2–0	1–1	1–0	1–1	0–1		1–0	0–1	1–2	4–1
Platense	1–1	1–0	0–3	1–0	3–2	1–0		0–0	2–1	2–0
Real España	2–0	2–2	1–1	0–1	2–2	2–0	1–0		0–0	1–0
Victoria	4–0	1–2	2–2	2–1	2–1	0–2	2–0	1–2		1–1
Vida	2–2	2–0	1–2	2–0	1–0	0–0	3–1	1–1	1–0	

Source: Soccerway
Legend: Blue = home team win; Yellow = draw; Red = away team win.

=== Final round ===
==== Second round ====
===== Olimpia vs Necaxa =====
23 November 2011
15:00 (UTC−06:00)
1st leg

Necaxa	1–1	Olimpia
Welcome 51'	Report	Pérez 83' (o.g.)

Estadio Fausto Flores Lagos
Choluteca, Choluteca
Attendance: 2,854
Referee: Armando Castro

Necaxa	Olimpia

GK	28	(Honduras) John Bodden
DF	2	(Honduras) Carlos Valle
DF	3	(Honduras) Samir García
DF	27	(Honduras) Luis Santamaría
MF	13	(Honduras) Nery Medina
MF	11	(Belize) Harrison Róches	(yellow card) 65'
MF	12	(Honduras) Jesús Navas	(substituted off) 71'
MF	14	(Honduras) Irvin Reyna
MF	17	(Honduras) Carlos Pérez
MF	26	(Honduras) Leonardo Isaula	Substituted off
FW	33	(Honduras) Shannon Welcome
Substitutions:
DF	23	Luis Guzmán	(substituted on) 71'
FW	9	Rubén Licona	Substituted on
Manager:
(Honduras) Jorge Pineda

GK	28	(Honduras) Donis Escober
DF	3	(Honduras) Henry Bermúdez
DF	4	(Brazil) Fábio de Souza	(yellow card) 26'
DF	5	(Honduras) Brayan Beckeles	(yellow card) 82'
DF	6	(Honduras) Juan García	Red card
DF	32	(Honduras) Boniek García
MF	8	(Honduras) Reynaldo Tilguath	(substituted off) 46'
MF	19	(Honduras) Luis Garrido
MF	25	(Honduras) Javier Portillo
FW	18	(Brazil) Douglas Caetano	Substituted off
FW	33	(Uruguay) Ramiro Bruschi	(substituted off) 75'
Substitutions:
MF	12	(Honduras) Miguel Castillo	(substituted on) 46'
FW	21	(Honduras) Roger Rojas	Substituted on
MF	7	(Honduras) Carlos Mejía	(substituted on) 75'
Manager:
(Argentina) Danilo Tosello

26 November 2011
19:30 (UTC−06:00)
2nd leg

Olimpia	1–0	Necaxa
Rojas 24'	Report

Estadio Tiburcio Carías Andino
Tegucigalpa, Francisco Morazán
Attendance: 2,197
Referee: Héctor Rodríguez

Olimpia	Necaxa

GK	28	(Honduras) Donis Escober
DF	3	(Honduras) Henry Bermúdez
DF	4	(Brazil) Fábio de Souza
DF	5	(Honduras) Brayan Beckeles
DF	30	(Honduras) Johnny Palacios
DF	32	(Honduras) Boniek García
MF	12	(Honduras) Miguel Castillo	(substituted off) 84'
MF	19	(Honduras) Luis Garrido
MF	25	(Honduras) Javier Portillo	Yellow card	(substituted off) 72'
FW	21	(Honduras) Roger Rojas	(substituted off) 86'
FW	33	(Uruguay) Ramiro Bruschi
Substitutions:
MF	8	(Honduras) Reynaldo Tilguath	(substituted on) 72'
MF	7	(Honduras) Carlos Mejía	(substituted on) 84'
FW	18	(Brazil) Douglas Caetano	(substituted on) 86'
Manager:
(Argentina) Danilo Tosello

GK	28	(Honduras) John Bodden
DF	2	(Honduras) Carlos Valle
DF	3	(Honduras) Samir García
DF	27	(Honduras) Luis Santamaría
MF	11	(Belize) Harrison Róches
MF	12	(Honduras) Jesús Navas	Substituted off
MF	13	(Honduras) Nery Medina	(yellow card) 39'
MF	14	(Honduras) Irvin Reyna	(substituted off) 81'
MF	17	(Honduras) Carlos Pérez
FW	33	(Honduras) Shannon Welcome	(substituted off) 74'
–	–	(Honduras) Nissi Sauceda
Substitutions:
FW	9	(Honduras) Rubén Licona	(substituted on) 74'
–	–	(Honduras) Héctor Muñoz	(substituted on) 81'
MF	–	(Honduras) José Burgos	Substituted on	Yellow card
Manager:
(Honduras) Jorge Pineda

- Olimpia won 2–1 on aggregate score.

===== Vida vs Deportes Savio =====
24 November 2011
18:00 (UTC−06:00)
1st leg

Deportes Savio	2–1	Vida
Rápalo 37'; Mejía 89' (pen.)	Report	Nascimento 40'

Estadio Sergio Antonio Reyes
Santa Rosa de Copán, Copán
Attendance: 1,371
Referee: Mario Moncada (1st half)
Miguel Torres (2nd half)

Deportes Savio	Vida

GK	28	(Honduras) Junior Morales
DF	5	(Honduras) Israel Fonseca
DF	17	(Honduras) Vicente Solórzano	Red card
DF	27	(Honduras) Kevin Johnson
DF	–	(Honduras) Óscar Fortín
MF	7	(Honduras) Julián Rápalo	(substituted off) 65'
MF	10	(Honduras) Óscar Zepeda
MF	23	(Honduras) Irving Guerreo
MF	26	(Honduras) Marco Mejía	Yellow card
FW	9	(Honduras) Juan Mejía	(substituted off) 89'
FW	13	(Brazil) Ney Costa	Yellow card
Substitutions:
MF	–	(Honduras) Boniek García	(substituted on) 65'	(substituted off) 90+3'
DF	16	(Honduras) Edder García	(substituted on) 89'
–	–	(Honduras) José Tobías	(substituted on) 90+3'
Manager:
(Honduras) Hernán García

GK	18	(Honduras) Obed Enamorado	Yellow card
DF	2	(Colombia) Luis Castro
DF	20	(Honduras) Jorge Lozano
DF	24	(Honduras) Manuel Doño
MF	8	(Honduras) Orlin Peralta
MF	12	(Honduras) Arnold Peralta
MF	19	(Argentina) Pablo Genovese
MF	21	(Honduras) Mario Chávez
MF	23	(Honduras) Chestyn Onofre	(yellow card) 27'
FW	10	(Brazil) Jocimar Nascimento
FW	26	(Colombia) Charles Córdoba	(substituted off) 79'
Substitutions:
FW	31	(Honduras) Rommel Quioto	(substituted on) 79'
Manager:
(Honduras) Carlos Martínez

26 November 2011
19:30 (UTC−06:00)
2nd leg

Vida	2–1	Deportes Savio
Nascimento 8'; Córdoba 80' (pen.)	Report	Morales 90+2'

Estadio Nilmo Edwards
La Ceiba, Atlántida
Attendance: 3,212
Referee: Raúl Castro

Vida	Deportes Savio

GK	18	(Honduras) Obed Enamorado
DF	2	(Colombia) Luis Castro	Yellow card
DF	20	(Honduras) Jorge Lozano
DF	21	(Honduras) Mario Chávez
MF	8	(Honduras) Orlin Peralta
MF	12	(Honduras) Arnold Peralta
MF	17	(Honduras) Francisco Pavón	(yellow card) 25'	(substituted off) 63'
MF	22	(Honduras) Abner Méndez	Yellow card	(substituted off) 46'
MF	23	(Honduras) Chestyn Onofre	Yellow card
FW	10	(Brazil) Jocimar Nascimento
FW	26	(Colombia) Charles Córdoba	(substituted off) 84'
Substitutions:
DF	24	(Honduras) Manuel Doño	(substituted on) 46'
MF	19	(Argentina) Pablo Genovese	(substituted on) 63'
FW	31	(Honduras) Rommel Quioto	(substituted on) 84'
Manager:
(Honduras) Carlos Martínez

GK	28	(Honduras) Junior Morales	(yellow card) 78'
DF	4	(Belize) Elroy Smith	(substituted off) 46'
DF	5	(Honduras) Israel Fonseca	Yellow card
DF	16	(Honduras) Edder García	(substituted off) 46'
DF	27	(Honduras) Kevin Johnson	(substituted off) 63'
DF	–	(Honduras) Óscar Fortín
MF	7	(Honduras) Julián Rápalo
MF	23	(Honduras) Irving Guerreo
MF	26	(Honduras) Marco Mejía
MF	–	(Honduras) Bryan Castro
FW	9	(Honduras) Juan Mejía	Yellow card
Substitutions:
FW	13	(Brazil) Ney Costa	(substituted on) 46'
MF	10	(Honduras) Óscar Zepeda	(substituted on) 46'
–	–	(Honduras) José Tobías	(substituted on) 63'
Manager:
(Honduras) Hernán García

- Vida 3–3 Deportes Savio on aggregate score; Vida advanced on a coin toss.

==== Semifinals ====
===== Real España vs Vida =====
30 November 2011
19:30 (UTC−06:00)
1st leg

Vida	0–1	Real España
	Report	Delgado 67'

Estadio Nilmo Edwards
La Ceiba, Atlántida
Attendance: 5,436
Referee: Geovanny Mendoza

Vida	Real España

GK	18	(Honduras) Obed Enamorado
DF	2	(Colombia) Luis Castro
DF	21	(Honduras) Mario Chávez
DF	24	(Honduras) Manuel Doño
MF	8	(Honduras) Orlin Peralta	(substituted off) 46'
MF	12	(Honduras) Arnold Peralta
MF	19	(Argentina) Pablo Genovese
MF	20	(Honduras) Jorge Lozano
MF	23	(Honduras) Chestyn Onofre	(yellow card) 43'	(substituted off) 71'
FW	10	(Brazil) Jocimar Nascimento
FW	26	(Colombia) Charles Córdoba	(substituted off) 62'
Substitutions:
MF	17	(Honduras) Francisco Pavón	(substituted on) 46'
FW	31	(Honduras) Rommel Quioto	(substituted on) 62'
MF	22	(Honduras) Abner Méndez	(substituted on) 71'
Manager:
(Honduras) Carlos Martínez

GK	1	(Honduras) Kevin Hernández
DF	13	(Honduras) Maynor Martínez
DF	21	(Honduras) Daniel Tejeda
DF	24	(Honduras) Ever Alvarado
DF	29	(Uruguay) Sergio Bica	(yellow card) 89'
MF	7	(Honduras) Mario Martínez	(substituted off) 85'
MF	8	(Uruguay) Julio Rodríguez	(substituted off) 70'
MF	20	(Honduras) Alfredo Mejía
MF	23	(Honduras) Edder Delgado	(yellow card) 59'
FW	10	(Honduras) Christian Martínez	(substituted off) 62'
FW	17	(Honduras) Allan Lalín
Substitutions:
FW	11	(Honduras) Luis Lobo	(substituted on) 62'	(yellow card) 81'
MF	12	(Honduras) Gerson Rodas	(substituted on) 70'
DF	4	(Honduras) Hilder Colón	(substituted on) 85'
Manager:
(Argentina) Mario Zanabria

3 December 2011
19:30 (UTC−06:00)
2nd leg

Real España	4–1	Vida
Lalín 45+1'; Martínez 47'; Lobo 55'; Delgado 90+1'	Report	Pavón 6'

Estadio Francisco Morazán
San Pedro Sula, Cortés
Attendance: 5,844
Referee: José Pineda

Real España	Vida

GK	22	(Uruguay) Marcelo Macías
DF	13	(Honduras) Maynor Martínez
DF	21	(Honduras) Daniel Tejeda
DF	24	(Honduras) Ever Alvarado
DF	29	(Uruguay) Sergio Bica
MF	7	(Honduras) Mario Martínez
MF	20	(Honduras) Alfredo Mejía
MF	23	(Honduras) Edder Delgado
FW	10	(Honduras) Christian Martínez	(substituted off) 69'
FW	17	(Honduras) Allan Lalín	(substituted off) 74'
FW	11	(Honduras) Luis Lobo	(yellow card) 18'	(substituted off) 81'
Substitutions:
FW	9	(Honduras) Carlos Pavón	(substituted on) 69'
MF	6	(Honduras) Jairo Puerto	(substituted on) 74'
MF	12	(Honduras) Gerson Rodas	(substituted on) 81'
Manager:
(Argentina) Mario Zanabria

GK	18	(Honduras) Obed Enamorado
DF	2	(Colombia) Luis Castro
DF	20	(Honduras) Jorge Lozano	(yellow card) 50'
DF	21	(Honduras) Mario Chávez	(substituted off) 69'
MF	8	(Honduras) Orlin Peralta	(yellow card) 79'
MF	17	(Honduras) Francisco Pavón	(substituted off) 64'
MF	19	(Argentina) Pablo Genovese	(yellow card) 8'
MF	22	(Honduras) Abner Méndez
MF	23	(Honduras) Chestyn Onofre
FW	26	(Colombia) Charles Córdoba
FW	31	(Honduras) Rommel Quioto
Substitutions:
–	–	(Honduras) Jesús Canales	(substituted on) 64'
FW	–	(Honduras) Henry Martínez	(substituted on) 69'
Manager:
(Honduras) Carlos Martínez

- Real España won 5–1 on aggregate score.

===== Marathón vs Olimpia =====
1 December 2011
19:00 (UTC−06:00)
1st leg

Olimpia	1–0	Marathón
Mejía 85'	Report

Estadio Tiburcio Carías Andino
Tegucigalpa, Francisco Morazán
Attendance: 10,747
Referee: Raúl Castro

Olimpia	Marathón

GK	28	(Honduras) Donis Escober
DF	3	(Honduras) Henry Bermúdez
DF	4	(Brazil) Fábio de Souza
DF	5	(Honduras) Brayan Beckeles
DF	13	(Honduras) Luis Garrido	(yellow card) 14'	(substituted off) 46'
DF	30	(Honduras) Johnny Palacios	(yellow card) 74'
DF	32	(Honduras) Boniek García
MF	12	(Honduras) Miguel Castillo
MF	26	(Honduras) Néstor Martínez	(substituted off) 60'
FW	21	(Honduras) Roger Rojas
FW	33	(Uruguay) Ramiro Bruschi	(substituted off) 76'
Substitutions:
FW	7	(Honduras) Carlos Mejía	(substituted on) 46'
FW	18	(Brazil) Douglas Caetano	(substituted on) 60'
MF	25	(Honduras) Javier Portillo	(substituted on) 76'	(yellow card) 87'
Manager:
(Argentina) Danilo Tosello

GK	1	(Belize) Shane Orio
DF	3	(Honduras) Astor Henríquez	(yellow card) 74'
DF	5	(Honduras) Erick Norales	(yellow card) 23'
DF	23	(Honduras) Mauricio Sabillón
DF	–	(Honduras) Rommel Murillo	(yellow card) 82'
MF	7	(Honduras) Emil Martínez	(yellow card) 68'	(substituted off) 71'
MF	8	(Honduras) Reinieri Mayorquín	(yellow card) 22'	(substituted off) 51'
MF	12	(Honduras) Mariano Acevedo
MF	19	(Honduras) Mario Berríos
FW	9	(Uruguay) Claudio Cardozo	(yellow card) 83'
FW	15	(Honduras) Marco Vega	(substituted off) 64'
Substitutions:
MF	14	(Honduras) Orvin Paz	(substituted on) 51'
FW	–	(Uruguay) Héctor Acuña	(substituted on) 64'
MF	26	(Honduras) Wilmer Fuentes	(substituted on) 71'
Manager:
(Uruguay) Manuel Keosseian

4 December 2011
15:00 (UTC−06:00)
2nd leg

Marathón	0–0	Olimpia
	Report

Estadio Yankel Rosenthal
San Pedro Sula, Cortés
Attendance: 5,931
Referee: Héctor Rodríguez

Marathón	Olimpia

GK	1	(Belize) Shane Orio
DF	3	(Honduras) Astor Henríquez	(substituted off) 76'
DF	5	(Honduras) Erick Norales	(yellow card) 63'
DF	23	(Honduras) Mauricio Sabillón
DF	–	(Honduras) Rommel Murillo
MF	7	(Honduras) Emil Martínez
MF	8	(Honduras) Reinieri Mayorquín
MF	14	(Honduras) Orvin Paz	(substituted off) 63'
MF	19	(Honduras) Mario Berríos	Red card
FW	9	(Uruguay) Claudio Cardozo
FW	–	(Uruguay) Héctor Acuña	(substituted off) 82'
Substitutions:
FW	15	(Honduras) Marco Vega	(substituted on) 63'
MF	–	(Honduras) Bani Lozano	(substituted on) 76'
FW	–	(Uruguay) Diego Silva	(substituted on) 82'
Manager:
(Uruguay) Manuel Keosseian

GK	28	(Honduras) Donis Escober	(yellow card) 34'
DF	3	(Honduras) Henry Bermúdez
DF	4	(Brazil) Fábio de Souza
DF	5	(Honduras) Brayan Beckeles	(yellow card) 66'
DF	13	(Honduras) Luis Garrido
DF	30	(Honduras) Johnny Palacios
DF	32	(Honduras) Boniek García	(substituted off) 72'
MF	12	(Honduras) Miguel Castillo
MF	25	(Honduras) Javier Portillo	(yellow card) 90'
FW	18	(Brazil) Douglas Caetano	(substituted off) 77'
FW	33	(Uruguay) Ramiro Bruschi	(substituted off) 63'
Substitutions:
FW	7	(Honduras) Carlos Mejía	(substituted on) 63'	(yellow card) 74'
MF	8	(Honduras) Reynaldo Tilguath	(substituted on) 72'
FW	21	(Honduras) Roger Rojas	(substituted on) 77'
Manager:
(Argentina) Danilo Tosello

- Olimpia won 1–0 on aggregate score.

==== Final ====
===== Real España vs Olimpia =====
11 December 2011
16:00 (UTC−06:00)
1st leg

Olimpia	1–0	Real España
Mejía 84'	Report

Estadio Tiburcio Carías Andino
Tegucigalpa, Francisco Morazán
Attendance: 22,818
Referee: Geovanny Mendoza

Olimpia	Real España

GK	28	(Honduras) Donis Escober
DF	3	(Honduras) Henry Bermúdez	(yellow card) 41'
DF	4	(Brazil) Fábio de Souza
DF	5	(Honduras) Brayan Beckeles
DF	13	(Honduras) Luis Garrido
DF	30	(Honduras) Johnny Palacios	(yellow card) 90'
DF	32	(Honduras) Boniek García
MF	8	(Honduras) Reynaldo Tilguath	(yellow card) 40'	(substituted off) 58'
MF	25	(Honduras) Javier Portillo	(substituted off) 90+1'
FW	18	(Brazil) Douglas Caetano	(yellow card) 61'
FW	33	(Uruguay) Ramiro Bruschi	(substituted off) 69'
Substitutions:
FW	7	(Honduras) Carlos Mejía	(substituted on) 58'
FW	21	(Honduras) Roger Rojas	(substituted on) 69'	(yellow card) 90+2'
MF	12	(Honduras) Miguel Castillo	(substituted on) 90+1'
Manager:
(Argentina) Danilo Tosello

GK	1	(Honduras) Kevin Hernández
DF	13	(Honduras) Maynor Martínez
DF	21	(Honduras) Daniel Tejeda
DF	29	(Uruguay) Sergio Bica
DF	24	(Honduras) Ever Alvarado	(yellow card) 25'	(substituted off) 46'
MF	7	(Honduras) Mario Martínez	(substituted off) 46'
MF	8	(Uruguay) Julio Rodríguez
MF	20	(Honduras) Alfredo Mejía	(yellow card) 85'
MF	23	(Honduras) Edder Delgado
FW	10	(Honduras) Christian Martínez	(substituted off) 58'
FW	14	(Honduras) Luis Lobo
Substitutions:
FW	17	(Honduras) Allan Lalín	(substituted on) 46'
DF	–	(Honduras) Johnny Calderón	(substituted on) 46'
MF	12	(Honduras) Gerson Rodas	(substituted on) 58'
Manager:
(Argentina) Mario Zanabria

17 December 2011
19:30 (UTC−06:00)
2nd leg

Real España	0–2	Olimpia
	Report	Mejía 82' 84'

Estadio Francisco Morazán
San Pedro Sula, Cortés
Attendance: 18,000
Referee: Héctor Rodríguez

Real España	Olimpia

GK	22	(Uruguay) Marcelo Macías
DF	21	(Honduras) Daniel Tejeda	Red card
DF	29	(Uruguay) Sergio Bica	(yellow card) 65'
DF	24	(Honduras) Ever Alvarado
MF	7	(Honduras) Mario Martínez	(yellow card) 87'
MF	8	(Uruguay) Julio Rodríguez	(yellow card) 76'
MF	20	(Honduras) Alfredo Mejía	(substituted off) 58'
MF	23	(Honduras) Edder Delgado
MF	–	(Honduras) Henry Acosta
FW	17	(Honduras) Allan Lalín	(substituted off) 46'
FW	9	(Honduras) Carlos Pavón	(substituted off) 80'
Substitutions:
FW	14	(Honduras) Luis Lobo	(substituted on) 46'
MF	6	(Honduras) Jairo Puerto	(substituted on) 58'	Red card
FW	10	(Honduras) Christian Martínez	(substituted on) 80'
Manager:
(Argentina) Mario Zanabria

GK	28	(Honduras) Donis Escober
DF	3	(Honduras) Henry Bermúdez	(yellow card) 33'
DF	4	(Brazil) Fábio de Souza
DF	5	(Honduras) Brayan Beckeles	(yellow card) 65'
DF	13	(Honduras) Luis Garrido	(substituted off) 89'
DF	30	(Honduras) Johnny Palacios	(yellow card) 34'
MF	8	(Honduras) Reynaldo Tilguath	(yellow card) 58'	(substituted off) 58'
MF	25	(Honduras) Javier Portillo
MF	32	(Honduras) Boniek García
FW	18	(Brazil) Douglas Caetano
FW	33	(Uruguay) Ramiro Bruschi	(substituted off) 63'
Substitutions:
MF	7	(Honduras) Carlos Mejía	(substituted on) 58'
FW	21	(Honduras) Roger Rojas	(substituted on) 63'
MF	10	(Honduras) Danilo Turcios	(substituted on) 89'
Manager:
(Argentina) Danilo Tosello

- Olimpia won 3–0 on aggregate score.

Liga Nacional
2011–12 Apertura champion

24th title

=== Top goalscorers ===
As of 17 December 2011

- 15 goals:

(Uruguay) Claudio Cardozo (Marathón)

- 9 goals:

(Honduras) Jerry Bengtson (Motagua)

- 7 goals:

(Colombia) Charles Córdoba (Vida)

- 6 goals:

(Honduras) Marco Vega (Marathón)
(Honduras) Juan Mejía (Deportes Savio)
(Uruguay) Óscar Torlacoff (Atlético Choloma)

- 5 goals:

(Honduras) Franco Güity (Atlético Choloma)
(Brazil) Jocimar Nascimento (Vida)
(Brazil) Ney Costa (Deportes Savio)
(Honduras) Roger Rojas (Olimpia)

- 4 goals:

(Honduras) Carlos Pavón (Real España)
(Honduras) Julián Rápalo (Deportes Savio)
(Honduras) Allan Lalín (Real España)
(Belize) Harrison Róches (Necaxa)
(Uruguay) Julio Rodríguez (Real España)
(Honduras) Luis Lobo (Real España)
(Colombia) Mauricio Copete (Victoria)
(Honduras) Nery Medina (Necaxa)
(Honduras) Carlos Mejía (Olimpia)

- 3 goals:

(Honduras) John Beaumont (Platense)
(Honduras) Roby Norales (Motagua)
(Honduras) Edder Delgado (Real España)
(Honduras) Carlos Oliva (Victoria)
(Honduras) Víctor Mena (Victoria)
(Honduras) Francisco Pavón (Vida)
(Honduras) Rommel Quioto (Vida)
(Honduras) Elmer Zelaya (Victoria)

- 2 goals:

(Honduras) Óscar Durón (Necaxa)
(Honduras) Francisco López (Atlético Choloma)
(Honduras) Mario Martínez (Real España)
(Belize) Elroy Smith (Deportes Savio)
(Honduras) Henry Córdoba (Platense)
(Uruguay) Héctor Acuña (Marathón)
(Honduras) Carlos Discua (Motagua)
(Honduras) Rubén Licona (Necaxa)
(Honduras) Reynaldo Tilguath (Olimpia)
(Honduras) Saul Martínez (Marathón)
(Honduras) Óscar Bonilla (Victoria)
(Brazil) Fábio Prates (Deportes Savio)
(Honduras) Mario Berríos (Marathón)
(Honduras) Amado Guevara (Motagua)
(Honduras) Jaime Rosales (Victoria)
(Honduras) Fredixon Elvir (Olimpia)
(Honduras) Hilder Colón (Real España)
(Uruguay) Ramiro Bruschi (Olimpia)
(Honduras) Marvin Sánchez (Atlético Choloma)
(Honduras) Shannon Welcome (Necaxa)
(Honduras) Christian Martínez (Real España)

- 1 goal:

(Honduras) Nahún Solís (Platense)
(Honduras) Kervin Johnson (Deportes Savio)
(Honduras) Daniel Tejeda (Real España)
(Uruguay) Diego Silva (Marathón)
(Panama) Luis Jaramillo (Victoria)
(Honduras) Johnny Palacios (Olimpia)
(Honduras) Ábner Méndez (Vida)
(Honduras) Elvis Scott (Platense)
(Honduras) Jerry Díaz (Platense)
(Honduras) Pedro Fernández (Vida)
(Honduras) José Tobías (Deportes Savio)
(Honduras) Henry Bermúdez (Olimpia)
(Honduras) Kevin Johnson (Deportes Savio)
(Honduras) Junior Morales (Deportes Savio)
(Honduras) Marco Mejía (Deportes Savio)
(Honduras) Boniek García (Olimpia)
(Honduras) Óscar Zepeda (Deportes Savio)
(Honduras) Bayron Méndez (Platense)
(Honduras) Ever Alvarado (Real España)
(Honduras) Milton Ruiz (Victoria)
(Honduras) Néstor Martínez (Olimpia)
(Honduras) Jesús Navas (Necaxa)
(Honduras) Érick Vallecillo (Atlético Choloma)
(Honduras) Juan Raudales (Atlético Choloma)
(Honduras) David Meza (Platense)
(Colombia) Luis Castro (Vida)
(Honduras) Carlos Morán (Motagua)
(Honduras) Júnior Padilla (Motagua)
(Brazil) Fábio de Souza (Olimpia)
(Honduras) Edward Suazo (Platense)
(Honduras) Aarón Bardales (Necaxa)
(Honduras) Mariano Acevedo (Marathón)
(Honduras) Wilmer Crisanto (Victoria)
(Honduras) Mitchel Rivera (Platense)
(Honduras) Ramón Castillo (Platense)
(Honduras) Brayan Beckeles (Olimpia)
(Honduras) Román Castillo (Vida)
(Honduras) Jorge Claros (Motagua)
(Honduras) Johnny Calderón (Real España)
(Honduras) Mario Chávez (Vida)
(Honduras) José Burgos (Necaxa)
(Honduras) Maynor Suazo (Atlético Choloma)
(Honduras) Michet Ávila (Motagua)
(Honduras) Gerson Rodas (Real España)

- 1 own-goal:

(Honduras) Carlos Discua (Motagua)
(Honduras) Víctor Mena (Victoria)
(Honduras) Wilfredo Barahona (Atlético Choloma)
(Honduras) Carlos Pérez (Necaxa)
(Honduras) Julián Rápalo (Deportes Savio)

== Clausura ==
The Clausura tournament started on 7 January and is set to finish in May 2012. The inauguration round started with a 2–2 drawn between C.D.S. Vida and C.D. Marathón at Estadio Nilmo Edwards and the Atlético Choloma's 2–1 home victory over C.D. Victoria. Club Deportivo Olimpia became the first team to ensure a postseason spot on 25 March in the 0–0 drawn against C.D. Motagua in the Honduran Superclásico; Marathón did it on 1 April in the 2–2 home drawn against C.D. Platense. Two weeks later, on 14 April, Motagua qualified thanks to its 0–1 away win at Marathón. Also on 14 April, C.D. Platense, was mathematically relegated to the Liga de Ascenso. One day later, Deportes Savio lost any postseason hopes, due to their 1–2 away lost at Estadio Excélsior against Platense. On 18 April, Atlético Choloma, Real C.D. España and Vida qualified to the Final round leaving Victoria and C.D. Necaxa eliminated.

All Second round clashes were determined on the very last round of the Regular phase; Atlético Choloma made history and qualified to the playoffs on their second season franchise and faced Real España, where they were eliminated after a 1–3 defeat on aggregate. Marathón had a drop in their last games performance and gave up the chance to play directly in the semifinals, they finished thirds and had to face Vida who finished fourth. In this phase, Marathón beat Vida with a tight 2–1 win on aggregate. Once in the semifinals, Olimpia had no troubles to eliminate Real España with a notorious 6–0 win on aggregate; meanwhile in the other series, Marathón surprised Motagua with a 0–2 away win at Tegucigalpa.

In the final series, Olimpia and Marathón faced each other in this instance for the 9th time. The first leg at Estadio Olímpico Metropolitano ended in a 0–0 draw, the game was mainly dominated by the home team but they were unable to score. In the second leg, Olimpia with an early second half goal by Brazilian striker Douglas Caetano captured its 25th domestic league. This title came in the year of the centenary for the White Lions.

=== Regular season ===
==== Standings ====
Pos	Team	Pld	W	D	L	GF	GA	GD	Pts	Qualification or relegation
1	Olimpia	18	10	5	3	32	14	+18	35	Qualification to the Semifinals
2	Motagua	18	7	11	0	22	10	+12	32	Qualification to the Semifinals
3	Marathón	18	8	7	3	25	19	+6	31	Qualification to the Second round
4	Atlético Choloma	18	8	5	5	20	18	+2	29	Qualification to the Second round
5	Real España	18	7	4	7	28	26	+2	25	Qualification to the Second round
6	Vida	18	5	9	4	24	25	−1	24	Qualification to the Second round
7	Victoria	18	7	1	10	28	28	0	22	
8	Necaxa	18	4	4	10	20	25	−5	16	
9	Deportes Savio	18	4	4	10	25	41	−16	16	
10	Platense	18	1	8	9	14	32	−18	11	

Updated to match(es) played on 22 April 2012. Source:

==== Results ====
As of 22 April 2012

Home \ Away	ACH	SAV	MAR	MOT	NEC	OLI	PLA	RES	VIC	VID
Atlético Choloma		2–1	2–3	0–0	2–0	1–0	1–0	1–1	2–1	2–1
Deportes Savio	0–0		1–1	1–4	2–1	2–4	2–1	2–5	2–1	3–3
Marathón	1–1	1–0		0–1	1–1	1–0	2–2	2–1	2–1	2–3
Motagua	1–0	0–0	1–1		2–0	0–0	1–1	2–0	2–0	1–1
Necaxa	2–0	2–1	0–1	2–2		0–0	5–0	0–1	2–3	0–0
Olimpia	2–0	7–2	1–0	0–0	4–0		2–0	2–2	1–0	1–0
Platense	0–2	2–1	1–1	1–1	0–3	0–3		1–1	2–2	1–1
Real España	3–1	2–1	1–3	1–1	2–0	1–2	1–0		1–2	4–0
Victoria	1–2	5–1	0–1	1–2	3–2	2–0	3–2	2–1		1–2
Vida	1–1	0–3	2–2	1–1	1–0	3–3	0–0	4–0	1–0	

Source: Soccerway
Legend: Blue = home team win; Yellow = draw; Red = away team win.

=== Final round ===
==== Second round ====
===== Marathón vs Vida =====
25 April 2012
19:30 (UTC−06:00)
1st leg

Vida	0–0	Marathón
	Report

Estadio Nilmo Edwards
La Ceiba, Atlántida
Attendance: 2,166
Referee: Geovanny Mendoza

Vida	Marathón

GK	18	(Honduras) Obed Enamorado
DF	2	(Colombia) Luis Castro
DF	14	(Honduras) Carlos Solórzano	Substituted off
DF	16	(Honduras) Irbin Guerrero	Yellow card
DF	20	(Honduras) Jorge Lozano
DF	23	(Honduras) Chestyn Onofre
DF	26	(Honduras) Óscar Morales
MF	12	(Honduras) Arnold Peralta	Substituted off
MF	19	(Argentina) Pablo Genovese	Yellow card
FW	10	(Colombia) Charles Córdoba
FW	31	(Honduras) Romell Quioto
Substitutions:
MF	22	(Honduras) Abner Méndez	Substituted on
DF	8	(Honduras) Orlin Peralta	Substituted on
–	–	–
Manager:
(Honduras) Carlos Martínez

GK	1	(Belize) Shane Orio
DF	2	(Honduras) Pastor Martínez
DF	20	(Honduras) Mario Beata
DF	23	(Honduras) Mauricio Sabillón	Yellow card
MF	6	(Honduras) David Meza
MF	7	(Honduras) Alexander Aguilar	Substituted off
MF	11	(Honduras) Christian Altamirano	Substituted off
MF	12	(Honduras) Mariano Acevedo	Yellow card
MF	17	(Honduras) Wilmer Fuentes
MF	19	(Honduras) Mario Berríos	Substituted off
FW	33	(Honduras) Mitchel Brown
Substitutions:
FW	10	(Honduras) Jerry Palacios	Substituted on
MF	8	(Honduras) Reinieri Mayorquín	Substituted on
MF	16	(Honduras) Oliver Fúnez	Substituted on
Manager:
(Honduras) Ramón Maradiaga

29 April 2012
15:30 (UTC−06:00)
2nd leg

Marathón	2–1	Vida
Palacios 29'; Meza 84'	Report	Méndez 57'

Estadio Yankel Rosenthal
San Pedro Sula, Cortés
Attendance: 1,455
Referee: Melvin Matamoros

Marathón	Vida

GK	1	(Belize) Shane Orio
DF	5	(Honduras) Yobani Ávila
DF	13	(Honduras) Romel Murillo	(red card) 45'
DF	22	(Honduras) Quiarol Arzú	(substituted off) 78'
DF	23	(Honduras) Mauricio Sabillón
MF	6	(Honduras) David Meza
MF	7	(Honduras) Alexander Aguilar	(substituted off) 60'
MF	17	(Honduras) Wilmer Fuentes
MF	19	(Honduras) Mario Berríos	Yellow card
FW	10	(Honduras) Jerry Palacios	(substituted off) 60'
FW	25	(Honduras) Luis Ramírez
Substitutions:
FW	15	(Honduras) Marco Vega	(substituted on) 60'
FW	33	(Honduras) Mitchel Brown	(substituted on) 60'
MF	16	(Honduras) Oliver Fúnez	(substituted on) 78'
Manager:
(Honduras) Ramón Maradiaga

GK	18	(Honduras) Obed Enamorado
DF	2	(Colombia) Luis Castro
DF	8	(Honduras) Orlin Peralta
DF	16	(Honduras) Irbin Guerrero
DF	20	(Honduras) Jorge Lozano
DF	23	(Honduras) Chestyn Onofre	Yellow card	(substituted off) 46'
DF	24	(Honduras) Manuel Doño	Yellow card
MF	12	(Honduras) Arnold Peralta	Yellow card
MF	19	(Argentina) Pablo Genovese	(substituted off) 86'
FW	10	(Colombia) Charles Córdoba	(substituted off) 80'
FW	31	(Honduras) Romell Quioto	Yellow card	(red card) 45'
Substitutions:
MF	22	(Honduras) Abner Méndez	(substituted on) 46'
DF	14	(Honduras) Carlos Solórzano	(substituted on) 80'
FW	13	(Brazil) Ney Costa	(substituted on) 86'
Manager:
(Honduras) Carlos Martínez

- Marathón won 2–1 on aggregate score.

===== Atlético Choloma vs Real España =====
25 April 2012
18:30 (UTC−06:00)
1st leg

Real España	1–0	Atlético Choloma
Lalín 47'	Report

Estadio Francisco Morazán
San Pedro Sula, Cortés
Attendance: 2,184
Referee: Héctor Rodríguez

Real España	Atlético Choloma

GK	1	(Honduras) Kevin Hernández
DF	14	(Honduras) Ever Alvarado
DF	21	(Honduras) Daniel Tejeda
DF	29	(Uruguay) Sergio Bica
MF	7	(Honduras) Mario Martínez	(substituted off) 77'	Yellow card
MF	8	(Uruguay) Julio Rodríguez
MF	16	(Honduras) Juan Acevedo
MF	23	(Honduras) Edder Delgado	Yellow card
MF	28	(Honduras) Henry Acosta
FW	17	(Honduras) Allan Lalín	(substituted off) 78'
FW	20	(Argentina) Jonatan Hansen
Substitutions:
FW	11	(Honduras) Luis Lobo	(substituted on) 77'
FW	6	(Honduras) Jairo Puerto	(substituted on) 78'
–	–	–
Manager:
(Argentina) Mario Zanabria

GK	25	(Honduras) Ricardo Canales
DF	5	(Honduras) Wilfredo Barahona
DF	15	(Honduras) Johnny Barrios
DF	17	(Honduras) Máximo Arzú
DF	26	(Honduras) Roy Posas	Yellow card
MF	8	(Honduras) Mauricio Castro	(substituted off) 66'
MF	10	(Honduras) Alex Andino
MF	16	(Honduras) Marvin Sánchez
MF	19	(Honduras) César Oseguera
MF	30	(Honduras) Juan Raudales
FW	7	(Honduras) Franco Güity
Substitutions:
MF	13	(Honduras) Aldo Oviedo	(substituted on) 66'
–	–	–
–	–	–
Manager:
(Honduras) Edwin Pavón

28 April 2012
19:30 (UTC−06:00)
2nd leg

Atlético Choloma	1–2	Real España
Torlacoff 39'	Report	Alvarado 42'; Rodríguez 75'

Estadio Rubén Deras
Choloma, Cortés
Attendance: 1,011
Referee: José Pineda

Atlético Choloma	Real España

GK	25	(Honduras) Ricardo Canales
DF	15	(Honduras) Johnny Barrios
DF	26	(Honduras) Roy Posas
MF	8	(Honduras) Mauricio Castro
MF	13	(Honduras) Aldo Oviedo
MF	16	(Honduras) Marvin Sánchez	(substituted off) 63'
MF	19	(Honduras) César Oseguera	(substituted off) 59'
MF	20	(Honduras) Walter Castro	(substituted off) 77'
MF	30	(Honduras) Juan Raudales
FW	7	(Honduras) Franco Güity
FW	28	(Uruguay) Óscar Torlacoff
Substitutions:
DF	5	(Honduras) Wilfredo Barahona	(substituted on) 59'
FW	11	(Brazil) Everaldo Ferreira	(substituted on) 63'
MF	10	(Honduras) Alex Andino	(substituted on) 77'
Manager:
(Honduras) Edwin Pavón

GK	22	(Uruguay) Marcelo Macías	Yellow card
DF	14	(Honduras) Ever Alvarado
DF	21	(Honduras) Daniel Tejeda
DF	29	(Uruguay) Sergio Bica
MF	7	(Honduras) Mario Martínez	Yellow card	(substituted off) 72'
MF	8	(Uruguay) Julio Rodríguez	(substituted off) 84'
MF	16	(Honduras) Juan Acevedo
MF	23	(Honduras) Edder Delgado
MF	28	(Honduras) Henry Acosta
FW	9	(Honduras) Carlos Pavón	Yellow card	(substituted off) 55'
FW	20	(Argentina) Jonatan Hansen
Substitutions:
FW	17	(Honduras) Allan Lalín	(substituted on) 55'
FW	11	(Honduras) Luis Lobo	(substituted on) 72'	Yellow card
DF	4	(Honduras) Hilder Colón	(substituted on) 84'
Manager:
(Argentina) Mario Zanabria

- Real España won 3–1 on aggregate score.

==== Semifinals ====
===== Olimpia vs Real España =====
3 May 2012
19:30 (UTC−06:00)
1st leg

Real España	0–1	Olimpia
	Report	García 90+4'

Estadio Francisco Morazán
San Pedro Sula, Cortés
Attendance: 6,543
Referee: Geovanny Mendoza

Real España	Olimpia

GK	1	(Honduras) Kevin Hernández
DF	14	(Honduras) Ever Alvarado	(yellow card) 10'	(red card) 89'
DF	21	(Honduras) Daniel Tejeda
DF	29	(Uruguay) Sergio Bica
MF	7	(Honduras) Mario Martínez	(substituted off) 63'
MF	8	(Uruguay) Julio Rodríguez
MF	16	(Honduras) Juan Acevedo
MF	23	(Honduras) Edder Delgado
MF	28	(Honduras) Henry Acosta	(yellow card) 40'
FW	17	(Honduras) Allan Lalín	(substituted off) 75'
FW	20	(Argentina) Jonatan Hansen	(substituted off) 71'
Substitutions:
FW	6	(Honduras) Jairo Puerto	(substituted on) 63'
FW	11	(Honduras) Luis Lobo	(substituted on) 71'
FW	9	(Honduras) Carlos Pavón	(substituted on) 75'
Manager:
(Argentina) Mario Zanabria

GK	28	(Honduras) Donis Escober
DF	4	(Brazil) Fábio de Souza
DF	5	(Honduras) Brayan Beckeles
DF	6	(Honduras) Juan García
DF	30	(Honduras) Johnny Palacios
DF	32	(Honduras) Boniek García
MF	8	(Honduras) Reynaldo Tilguath	(yellow card) 76'	(substituted off) 76'
MF	19	(Honduras) Luis Garrido	(yellow card) 78'
MF	25	(Honduras) Javier Portillo
MF	33	(Uruguay) Ramiro Bruschi	(substituted off) 59'
FW	17	(Honduras) Juan Mejía	(yellow card) 13'	(substituted off) 64'
Substitutions:
FW	21	(Honduras) Roger Rojas	(substituted on) 59'
MF	7	(Honduras) Carlos Mejía	(substituted on) 64'
FW	9	(Brazil) Cristiano dos Santos	(substituted on) 76'
Manager:
(Argentina) Danilo Tosello

6 May 2012
16:00 (UTC−06:00)
2nd leg

Olimpia	5–0	Real España
Tilguath 36' (pen.); Mejía 46'; Bruschi 49'; Rojas 58' 81'	Report

Estadio Tiburcio Carías Andino
Tegucigalpa, Francisco Morazán
Attendance: 7,123
Referee: Armando Castro

Olimpia	Real España

GK	28	(Honduras) Donis Escober
DF	4	(Brazil) Fábio de Souza
DF	5	(Honduras) Brayan Beckeles
DF	6	(Honduras) Juan García
DF	30	(Honduras) Johnny Palacios
DF	32	(Honduras) Boniek García
MF	8	(Honduras) Reynaldo Tilguath	(substituted off) 65'
MF	19	(Honduras) Luis Garrido
MF	25	(Honduras) Javier Portillo	(yellow card) 73'
MF	33	(Uruguay) Ramiro Bruschi	(substituted off) 55'
FW	17	(Honduras) Juan Mejía	(substituted off) 51'
Substitutions:
FW	21	(Honduras) Roger Rojas	(substituted on) 51'
MF	7	(Honduras) Carlos Mejía	(substituted on) 55'
MF	20	(Honduras) Irvin Reyna	(substituted on) 65'
Manager:
(Argentina) Danilo Tosello

GK	22	(Uruguay) Marcelo Macías
DF	4	(Honduras) Hilder Colón
DF	18	(Honduras) David Roura
DF	21	(Honduras) Daniel Tejeda
DF	29	(Uruguay) Sergio Bica
MF	7	(Honduras) Mario Martínez	(yellow card) 40'
MF	8	(Uruguay) Julio Rodríguez	(substituted off) 74'
MF	23	(Honduras) Edder Delgado	(red card) 38'
MF	28	(Honduras) Henry Acosta
FW	11	(Honduras) Luis Lobo	(substituted off) 44'
FW	17	(Honduras) Allan Lalín	Substituted on
Substitutions:
MF	16	(Honduras) Juan Acevedo	(substituted on) 44'
FW	6	(Honduras) Jairo Puerto	(substituted on) 74'
FW	20	(Argentina) Jonatan Hansen	Substituted on
Manager:
(Argentina) Mario Zanabria

- Olimpia won 6–0 on aggregate score.

===== Motagua vs Marathón =====
2 May 2012
19:30 (UTC−06:00)
1st leg

Marathón	0–0	Motagua
	Report

Estadio Olímpico Metropolitano
San Pedro Sula, Cortés
Attendance: 5,795
Referee: Héctor Rodríguez

Marathón	Motagua

GK	1	(Belize) Shane Orio
DF	3	(Honduras) Mauricio Sabillón
DF	5	(Honduras) Yobani Ávila
DF	20	(Honduras) Mario Beata	(substituted off) 80'
DF	22	(Honduras) Quiarol Arzú
MF	6	(Honduras) David Meza	Yellow card
MF	7	(Honduras) Alexander Aguilar
MF	17	(Honduras) Wilmer Fuentes
MF	19	(Honduras) Mario Berríos
FW	10	(Honduras) Jerry Palacios	Yellow card	(substituted off) 59'
FW	25	(Honduras) Luis Ramírez	(substituted off) 75'
Substitutions:
MF	16	(Honduras) Oliver Fúnez	(substituted on) 59'	Yellow card
FW	15	(Honduras) Marco Vega	(substituted on) 75'
DF	13	(Honduras) Romel Murillo	(substituted on) 80'
Manager:
(Honduras) Ramón Maradiaga

GK	22	(Honduras) Donaldo Morales
DF	2	(Honduras) Odis Borjas
DF	4	(Honduras) Júnior Izaguirre
DF	5	(Honduras) David Molina
DF	13	(Honduras) Nery Medina
DF	23	(Honduras) Sergio Mendoza
MF	6	(Honduras) Emilson Cruz
MF	7	(Honduras) Carlos Discua	(substituted off) 46'
MF	20	(Honduras) Amado Guevara	Yellow card	(substituted off) 58'
FW	9	(Honduras) Georgie Welcome	(substituted off) 67'
FW	52	(Honduras) Marvin Barrios
Substitutions:
FW	27	(Honduras) Jerry Bengtson	(substituted on) 46'
MF	11	(Honduras) Melvin Valladares	(substituted on) 58'
MF	10	(Honduras) Julio de León	(substituted on) 67'	Yellow card
Manager:
(Mexico) José Treviño

5 May 2012
19:30 (UTC−06:00)
2nd leg

Motagua	0–2	Marathón
	Report	Berríos 20'; Brown 76'

Estadio Tiburcio Carías Andino
Tegucigalpa, Francisco Morazán
Attendance: 5,732
Referee: Raúl Castro

Motagua	Marathón

GK	22	(Honduras) Donaldo Morales
DF	2	(Honduras) Odis Borjas
DF	4	(Honduras) Júnior Izaguirre
DF	5	(Honduras) David Molina
DF	13	(Honduras) Nery Medina	(substituted off) 30'
DF	23	(Honduras) Sergio Mendoza	(substituted off) 25'
MF	7	(Honduras) Carlos Discua
MF	20	(Honduras) Amado Guevara	(substituted off) 65'
MF	24	(Honduras) Omar Elvir
FW	27	(Honduras) Jerry Bengtson
FW	52	(Honduras) Marvin Barrios	(yellow card) 34'
Substitutions:
FW	9	(Honduras) Georgie Welcome	(substituted on) 25'
MF	10	(Honduras) Julio de León	(substituted on) 30'	(yellow card) 72'
MF	11	(Honduras) Melvin Valladares	(substituted on) 65'
Manager:
(Mexico) José Treviño

GK	1	(Belize) Shane Orio	(yellow card) 74'
DF	2	(Honduras) Pastor Martínez
DF	5	(Honduras) Yobani Ávila	(yellow card) 36'
DF	22	(Honduras) Quiarol Arzú
DF	23	(Honduras) Mauricio Sabillón
MF	6	(Honduras) David Meza
MF	7	(Honduras) Alexander Aguilar	(substituted off) 63'
MF	17	(Honduras) Wilmer Fuentes
MF	19	(Honduras) Mario Berríos
FW	10	(Honduras) Jerry Palacios	(substituted off) 82'
FW	33	(Honduras) Mitchel Brown	(yellow card) 41'	(substituted off) 80'
Substitutions:
MF	8	(Honduras) Reinieri Mayorquín	(substituted on) 63'
FW	25	(Honduras) Luis Ramírez	(substituted on) 80'
MF	12	(Honduras) Mariano Acevedo	(substituted on) 82'
Manager:
(Honduras) Ramón Maradiaga

- Marathón won 2–0 on aggregate score.

==== Final ====
===== Olimpia vs Marathón =====
12 May 2012
18:30 (UTC−06:00)
1st leg

Marathón	0–0	Olimpia
	Report

Estadio Olímpico Metropolitano
San Pedro Sula, Cortés
Attendance: 13,898
Referee: Armando Castro

Marathón	Olimpia

GK	1	(Belize) Shane Orio
RB	23	(Honduras) Mauricio Sabillón
CB	22	(Honduras) Quiarol Arzú	(substituted off) 46'
CB	13	(Honduras) Rommel Murillo
DF	5	(Honduras) Edwin Yobani Avila
DM	6	(Honduras) David Meza
RM	7	(Honduras) Alexander Aguilar	(substituted off) 82'
CM	17	(Honduras) Wilmer Fuentes
LM	19	(Honduras) Mario Berríos
CF	10	(Honduras) Jerry Palacios	(substituted off) 65'
CF	33	(Honduras) Mitchel Brown	(yellow card) 78'
Substitutions:
DF	2	(Honduras) Pastor Martínez	(substituted on) 46'
MF	12	(Honduras) Mariano Acevedo	(substituted on) 65'
MF	8	(Honduras) Reinieri Mayorquín	(substituted on) 82'
Manager:
(Honduras) Ramón Maradiaga

GK	28	(Honduras) Donis Escober	(yellow card) 84'
RB	5	(Honduras) Brayan Beckeles
CB	4	(Brazil) Fábio de Souza
CB	30	(Honduras) Johnny Palacios
LB	6	(Honduras) Juan Carlos García
RM	32	(Honduras) Boniek García
CM	8	(Honduras) Reynaldo Tilguath	(substituted off) 70'
CM	19	(Honduras) Luis Garrido
LM	25	(Honduras) Javier Portillo	(substituted off) 88'
CF	17	(Honduras) Juan Mejía	(yellow card) 15'	(substituted off) 63'
CF	21	(Honduras) Roger Rojas
Substitutions:
MF	7	(Honduras) Carlos Mejía	(substituted on) 63'
MF	20	(Honduras) Irvin Reyna	(substituted on) 70'
MF	23	(Honduras) Óscar Bonilla	(substituted on) 88'
Manager:
(Argentina) Danilo Tosello

20 May 2012
16:00 (UTC−06:00)
2nd leg

Olimpia	1–0	Marathón
Caetano 47'	Report

Estadio Tiburcio Carías Andino
Tegucigalpa, Francisco Morazán
Attendance: 26,692
Referee: Héctor Rodríguez

Olimpia	Marathón

GK	28	(Honduras) Donis Escober
DF	4	(Brazil) Fábio de Souza	(yellow card) 33'
DF	5	(Honduras) Brayan Beckeles	Yellow card
DF	6	(Honduras) Juan García
DF	30	(Honduras) Johnny Palacios
DF	32	(Honduras) Boniek García
MF	8	(Honduras) Reynaldo Tilguath	(substituted off) 77'
MF	19	(Honduras) Luis Garrido	(yellow card) 41'
MF	25	(Honduras) Javier Portillo
FW	17	(Honduras) Juan Mejía	(substituted off) 70'
FW	18	(Brazil) Douglas Caetano	(substituted off) 85'
Substitutions:
FW	21	(Honduras) Roger Rojas	(substituted on) 70'
MF	7	(Honduras) Carlos Mejía	(substituted on) 77'
FW	9	(Brazil) Cristiano dos Santos	(substituted on) 85'
Manager:
(Argentina) Danilo Tosello

GK	1	(Belize) Shane Orio
DF	5	(Honduras) Yobani Ávila
DF	13	(Honduras) Romel Murillo	(red card) 74'
DF	20	(Honduras) Mario Beata
DF	23	(Honduras) Mauricio Sabillón
MF	7	(Honduras) Alexander Aguilar	(substituted off) 59'
MF	9	(Honduras) David Meza	Yellow card
MF	17	(Honduras) Wilmer Fuentes
MF	19	(Honduras) Mario Berríos	(substituted off) 79'
FW	10	(Honduras) Jerry Palacios	(substituted off) 72'
FW	33	(Honduras) Mitchel Brown
Substitutions:
FW	25	(Honduras) Luis Ramírez	(substituted on) 59'
FW	18	(Belize) Harrison Róches	(substituted on) 72'
MF	12	(Honduras) Mariano Acevedo	(substituted on) 79'
Manager:
(Honduras) Ramón Maradiaga

- Olimpia won 1–0 on aggregate score.

Liga Nacional
2011–12 Clausura champion

25th title

=== Top goalscorers ===
As of 20 May 2012

- 9 goals:

(Uruguay) Óscar Torlacoff (Atlético Choloma)
(Colombia) Mauricio Copete (Victoria)

- 8 goals:

(Brazil) Jocimar Nascimento (Deportes Savio)
(Honduras) Roger Rojas (Olimpia)

- 7 goals:

(Honduras) Luis Ramírez (Marathón)
(Colombia) Charles Córdoba (Vida)
(Honduras) Juan Mejía (Olimpia)

- 6 goals:

(Honduras) Carlos Discua (Motagua)
(Argentina) Jonathan Hansen (Real España)
(Brazil) Douglas Caetano (Olimpia)

- 5 goals:

(Uruguay) Julio Rodríguez (Real España)
(Honduras) Abner Méndez (Vida)
(Honduras) Romell Quioto (Vida)
(Honduras) Elmer Zelaya (Victoria)

- 4 goals:

(Honduras) Víctor Mena (Victoria)
(Honduras) Aly Arriola (Deportes Savio)
(Honduras) Franco Güity (Atlético Choloma)
(Honduras) Kervin Johnson (Deportes Savio)
(Honduras) Marco Vega (Marathón)
(Uruguay) Ramiro Bruschi (Olimpia)
(Honduras) Shannon Welcome (Necaxa)
(Honduras) Rubén Licona (Necaxa)

- 3 goals:

(Honduras) Carlos Pavón (Real España)
(Honduras) Mario Martínez (Real España)
(Honduras) Reynaldo Tilguath (Olimpia)
(Honduras) Marvin Sánchez (Atlético Choloma)
(Honduras) Pastor Martínez (Marathón)
(Honduras) Mitchel Brown (Marathón)
(Honduras) Rigoberto Padilla (Victoria)
(Honduras) Edder Delgado (Real España)

- 2 goals:

(Honduras) Julio de León (Motagua)
(Honduras) Walter Martínez (Necaxa)
(Honduras) Mariano Acevedo (Marathón)
(Honduras) Jerry Bengtson (Motagua)
(Honduras) Christian Martínez (Real España)
(Honduras) Mitchel Rivera (Platense)
(Honduras) Amado Guevara (Motagua)
(Honduras) Jerry Palacios (Marathón)
(Honduras) Luis Lobo (Real España)
(Honduras) Nissi Sauceda (Necaxa)
(Honduras) Cristopher Urmeneta (Necaxa)
(Honduras) Ángel Pineda (Deportes Savio)
(Honduras) Juan García (Olimpia)
(Honduras) Víctor Ortiz (Victoria)
(Honduras) Allan Lalín (Real España)
(Honduras) Francisco López (Platense)
(Honduras) Samir García (Necaxa)
(Honduras) Fredixon Elvir (Olimpia)
(Brazil) Fábio de Souza (Olimpia)
(Honduras) Ever Alvarado (Real España)
(Honduras) Boniek García (Olimpia)
(Honduras) David Meza (Marathón)

- 1 goal:

(Honduras) Johnny Leverón (Motagua)
(Honduras) Óscar Zepeda (Deportes Savio)
(Colombia) Luis Castro (Vida)
(Honduras) Orlin Peralta (Vida)
(Brazil) Moacyr Filho (Platense)
(Honduras) David Colón (Victoria)
(Honduras) Óscar Morales (Vida)
(Honduras) Henry Córdova (Platense)
(Honduras) Roby Norales (Motagua)
(Honduras) Johnny Palacios (Olimpia)
(Brazil) Everaldo Ferreira (Atlético Choloma)
(Belize) Elroy Smith (Deportes Savio)
(Honduras) Óscar García (Deportes Savio)
(Honduras) Kevin Osorio (Necaxa)
(Honduras) Junior Padilla (Motagua)
(Honduras) Nahún Solís (Platense)
(Honduras) Luis Arriola (Necaxa)
(Honduras) Júnior Izaguirre (Motagua)
(Honduras) Mario Berríos (Marathón)
(Honduras) Julián Rápalo (Deportes Savio)
(Belize) Harrison Róches (Marathón)
(Honduras) Mauricio Castro (Atlético Choloma)
(Honduras) David Molina (Motagua)
(Honduras) Jairo Crisanto (Victoria)
(Honduras) Jorge Lozano (Vida)
(Honduras) Mauricio Sabillón (Marathón)
(Honduras) Jefry Flores (Real España)
(Honduras) Eder García (Deportes Savio)
(Honduras) Ian Osorio (Platense)
(Honduras) Aldo Oviedo (Atlético Choloma)
(Honduras) Félix Crisanto (Victoria)
(Honduras) Jairo Puerto (Real España)
(Honduras) Romel Murillo (Marathón)
(Honduras) Ricardo Barrios (Motagua)
(Honduras) Carlos Mejía (Olimpia)
(Honduras) Raúl Santos (Vida)
(Honduras) Bayron Méndez (Platense)
(Honduras) Jorge Cardona (Platense)
(Brazil) Ney Costa (Vida)
(Honduras) Francisco Pavón (Vida)
(Honduras) Francisco Díaz (Platense)
(Honduras) Jerry Díaz (Platense)
(Honduras) Abidán Solís (Atlético Choloma)
(Honduras) Elder Valladares (Atlético Choloma)
(Honduras) Alexander Aguilar (Marathón)
(Honduras) Ronald Martínez (Motagua)
(Honduras) José Tobías (Deportes Savio)
(Honduras) Jesús Navas (Necaxa)
(Honduras) Rony Morales (Platense)
(Honduras) Sergio Mendoza (Motagua)
(Honduras) José Casildo (Platense)
(Honduras) Carlos Solórzano (Vida)
(Honduras) Georgie Welcome (Motagua)
(Panama) Luis Jaramillo (Victoria)
(Honduras) Marco Mejía (Deportes Savio)

- 1 own goal:

(Honduras) Maynor Martínez (Real España)
(Honduras) Jorge Lozano (Vida)
(Honduras) Johny Galdámez (Deportes Savio)
(Honduras) Henry Acosta (Real España)
(Honduras) Ian Osorio (Platense)
(Honduras) Wilmer Crisanto (Victoria)
(Honduras) Juan Montes (Necaxa)

== Aggregate table ==
Relegation was determined by the aggregated table of both Apertura and Clausura tournaments. On 14 April, C.D. Platense became officially relegated to the second division, it is the first relegation for the Escualos since the 1981–82 season; however, on 25 May 2012, Platense bought C.D. Necaxa's franchise for L. 4.5 million and will play in the first division for the 2012–13 season.

Pos	Team	Pld	W	D	L	GF	GA	GD	Pts	Qualification or relegation
1	Marathón	36	17	11	8	57	38	+19	62	Qualification for 2012–13 CONCACAF Champions League (Note: Since Olimpia won both the Apertura and Clausura, Marathón qualified for the CCL as the team with the best aggregate record.)
2	Olimpia	36	17	10	9	48	25	+23	61	Qualification for 2012–13 CONCACAF Champions League
3	Real España	36	16	11	9	53	39	+14	59	
4	Motagua	36	13	15	8	42	29	+13	54	
5	Vida	36	12	14	10	43	46	−3	50	
6	Atlético Choloma	36	11	14	11	38	45	−7	47	
7	Victoria	36	12	5	19	49	53	−4	41	
8	Deportes Savio	36	10	10	16	47	66	−19	40	
9	Necaxa	36	10	9	17	36	45	−9	39	
10	Platense	36	7	11	18	28	55	−27	32	Relegated to the 2012–13 Liga de Ascenso

Updated to match(es) played on 22 April 2012. Source:
