= List of Hondurans =

This is a list of Honduran people:

== Politicians ==
- Óscar Acosta
- Salvador Aguirre (Honduras)
- Juan José Alvarado
- José Adolfo Alvarado Lara
- Oscar Álvarez
- Oswaldo López Arellano
- Juan Ángel Arias
- Céleo Arias
- Juan Ángel Arias Boquín
- Miguel Paz Barahona
- Francisco Bertrand
- Elizabeth Azcona Bocock
- Francisco Bográn
- Luis Bográn
- Policarpo Bonilla
- Manuel Bonilla
- Francisco Bueso
- José Santiago Bueso
- José María Bustillo
- Miguel Oquelí Bustillo
- José Trinidad Cabañas
- Tiburcio Carías Andino
- Victoriano Castellanos
- Juan Alberto Melgar Castro
- Coronado Chávez
- Vicente Mejía Colindres
- Roberto Suazo Córdova
- Ramón Ernesto Cruz Uclés
- Miguel R. Dávila
- Francisco de Aguilar
- Dionisio de Herrera
- José Azcona del Hoyo
- José Cecilio del Valle
- Nora Gúnera de Melgar
- Juan Francisco de Molina
- Maribel Espinoza
- Francisco Ferrera
- Carlos Roberto Flores
- Juan Manuel Gálvez
- Policarpo Paz García
- Mariano Garrigó
- Crescencio Gómez
- Francisco Gómez (acting president)
- José Santos Guardiola
- José María Guerrero
- Carlos Urbizo
- Mauricio Villeda Bermúdez
- Ramón Villeda Bermúdez
- Ramón Villeda Morales
- Miguel Antonio Zúniga

== Sports ==
- Edgar Álvarez
- Eduardo Alonso Arriola Carter
- Edwin Yobani Avila
- Nahún Avila
- Wilfredo Barahona
- Mario Beata
- Eduardo Bennet
- Jefferson Bernárdez
- Robel Bernardez
- Víctor Bernárdez
- Mario René Berríos
- Porfirio Armando Betancourt
- John Alston Bodden
- Mitchel Brown
- Samuel Caballero
- Ricardo Canales
- Juan Manuel Cárcamo
- José Cardona
- Miguel Castillo
- Mauricio Castro
- Marvin Chávez
- Osman Chávez
- Jorge Claros
- Reynaldo Clavasquín
- Víctor Coello
- Denilson Costa
- Carlo Costly
- Arnold Cruz
- José Luis Cruz
- José de la Paz Herrera
- Julio César de León
- Alberth Elis
- Donis Escober
- Roger Espinoza
- Dennis Ferrera
- Maynor Figueroa
- Milton Flores
- Oscar Boniek García
- Elkin González
- José Luis Grant
- Iván Guerrero
- Amado Guevara
- José Guity
- Emilio Izaguirre
- Anthony Lozano
- Andy Najar
- Wilson Palacios
- Carlos Pavón
- Arnold Peralta
- Jorge Elias Ponce
- Romell Quioto
- David Suazo
- Noel Valladares

== Authors ==
- Ramón Amaya Amador
- Eduardo Bähr
- Augusto Coello
- Javier Abril Espinoza

== Entertainment (Radio/TV/Film) ==
- Renán Almendárez Coello
- Dunia Elvir
- Fermin Galeano
- America Ferrera

== Uncategorized ==
- Juan Ángel Almendares Bonilla
- Julieta Castellanos
- Leticia de Oyuela
- Rony García
- Astor Henriquez
- Walter Hernández (footballer)
- Yermi Hernández
- Francisco Inestroza
- Emilio Izaguirre
- Júnior Izaguirre
- Milton Jiménez
- Allan Lalín
- Marlon Guillermo Lara Orellana
- Ponciano Leiva
- Johnny Leverón
- Juan Lindo
- Porfirio Pepe Lobo
- Luis López (footballer, born 1986)
- Rafael López Gutiérrez
- Walter López (footballer)
- Julio Lozano Díaz
- Ricardo Maduro
- Ramón Maradiaga
- Elmer Marín
- Christian Samir Martínez
- Emil Martínez
- Jairo Martínez
- Javier Martínez (footballer, born 1971)
- Saul Martínez
- Walter Martínez
- Rubén Matamoros
- Felipe Neri Medina
- Héctor Medina
- José María Medina
- Nery Medina
- Ninrod Medina
- Carlos Will Mejía
- Marcelino Mejía
- Merlyn Membreño
- Victor Mena
- Carlos Mencia
- Indyra Mendoza
- Sergio Mendoza
- Roberto Micheletti
- David Molina
- Salvador Moncada
- Oscar Morales
- Augusto Monterroso
- José Francisco Montes
- Elmer Montoya
- Donaldo Morales
- Junior Morales
- Leonardo Morales
- Ramón Villeda Morales
- Rony Morales
- Carlos Morán
- Francisco Morazán
- Steven Morris
- Erick Norales
- Milton Núñez
- Ramón Núñez
- Aguas Santas Ocaña Navarro
- Carlos Oliva
- Carlos Paez
- Wilson Palacios
- Carlos Pavón
- Francisco Pavón (footballer)
- Limber Perez
- Alex Pineda Chacón
- Roy Posas
- Satcha Pretto
- Dania Prince
- Adalid Puerto
- Luis Ramírez (footballer)
- Rafael Coello Ramos
- Carlos Roberto Reina
- Milton Reyes
- Williams Reyes
- Irving Reyna
- Rocsi
- Luis Rodas
- Mario Rodríguez (Honduras)
- Rafael Leonardo Callejas Romero
- Jaime Rosales
- Jaime Rosenthal
- Yani Rosenthal
- Mauricio Sabillón
- Carlos Salgado
- Juan Ramón Salgado
- Marvin Sánchez
- Luis Santamaría
- Elvin Ernesto Santos
- Elvis Scott
- Terencio Sierra
- Roberto Sosa (poet)
- Marco Aurelio Soto
- David Suazo
- Julio César Suazo
- Maynor Suazo
- Hendry Thomas
- Reynaldo Tilguath
- Vicente Tosta
- Danilo Turcios
- Ramón Ernesto Cruz Uclés
- Fabio Ulloa
- Melvin Valladares
- Noel Valladares
- Érick Vallecillo
- Orlin Vallecillo
- Steve Van Buren
- Domingo Vásquez
- Edy Vasquez
- Eddy Vega
- Wilmer Velásquez
- Diego Vigil Cocaña
- Franklin Vinosis Webster
- George Welcome
- Florencio Xatruch
- Gilberto Yearwood
- Francisco Zelaya y Ayes
- Héctor Zelaya
- Manuel Zelaya
- Xiomara de Zelaya
- Denisse Maradiaga

== See also ==
- List of people by nationality
