= Ábner Méndez =

Honduran footballer (born 1988)

Personal information
- Full name: Ábner Elí Méndez Peña
- Date of birth: 1 August 1988 (age 38)
- Place of birth: Puerto Cortés, Honduras
- Height: 1.76 m (5 ft 9 in)
- Position: Midfielder

Senior career*
| Years | Team | Apps | (Gls) |
| 2007–2008 | Platense | 3 | (0) |
| 2008–2011 | Hispano | 46 | (4) |
| 2011–2012 | Olimpia | 1 | (0) |
| 2011–2012 | → Vida (loan) | 36 | (6) |
| 2012 | Motagua | 8 | (0) |
| 2013 | Atlético Choloma | 6 | (1) |
| 2013–2014 | Victoria | 12 | (0) |
| 2014–2015 | Real Sociedad | 18 | (0) |
| 2016 | Platense | 10 | (0) |
| 2017 | Social Sol | | |

International career
| 2011 | Honduras | 1 | (0) |
- * Club domestic league appearances and goals

Ábner Elí Méndez Peña (born 1 August 1988) is a Honduran footballer who played in the Honduran National League from 2007 to 2017.

== Club career ==
Méndez played for several clubs before moving to F.C. Motagua in May 2012. A right-sided midfielder he joined the Motagua injury list in August 2012 with an ankle injury. He then joined Atlético Choloma for the 2013 Clausura.

== International career ==
On 11 October 2011, Méndez made his international debut for Honduras, coming in as substitute for Julio César de León in the 88th minute in a friendly match against Jamaica.

== Statistics ==
=== Club statistics ===
| Club | Season | League | | Continental | | Total | |
| Club | Season | Apps | Goals | Apps | Goals | Apps | Goals |
|---|---|---|---|---|---|---|---|
| Vida | 2011–12 | 15 | 1 | — | | 15 | 1 |
