= Rapalo =

Rapalo or Rápalo is a surname. Notable people with the surname include:

- Christopher Rapalo (fl. from 2016), American photographer, filmmaker, and production company owner
- Julián Rápalo (born 1986), Honduran footballer
