= Villeda =

Villeda is a surname. Notable people with the surname include:

- Mauricio Villeda (born 1948), Honduran attorney and leader of the Liberal Party of Honduras
- Ramón Villeda Bermúdez (1937–2012), Honduran veterinarian and politician
- Ramón Villeda Morales (1909–1971), Honduran politician and President of Honduras

== See also ==
- Ramón Villeda Morales International Airport, is an airport in Honduras
- Ramón Villeda Morales (municipality), is a municipality in the Honduran department
- Rudolfo Infante and Anna Villeda, is a Mexican-American serial killer pair
