= Ponce (surname) =

Ponce is a surname or part of a surname. Notable people with the surname include:

== American people ==
- Cody Ponce, American baseball player
- Dan Ponce, American television journalist
- Phil Ponce, American television journalist

== Argentinian people ==
- Cecilia Ludmila Ponce, Argentine actress on Mexican Telenovelas
- Ezequiel Ponce, Argentine footballer
- María Ponce de Bianco (1924–1978), Argentine social activist

== Chilean people ==
- Miguel Ponce (born 1971), Chilean footballer
- Waldo Ponce (born 1982), Chilean footballer
- Walter Ponce (born 1998), Chilean footballer

== Filipino people ==
- Juan Ponce Enrile (born 1924), Filipino politician and senator
- Juan Ponce Sumuroy (fl. 1649-1650), Filipino rebel leader
- Mariano Ponce (1863–1918), Filipino physician and leader of the Propaganda Movement

== Mexican people ==
- Daniel Ponce de León (born 1980), Mexican professional boxer
- Edgar Ponce (1974–2005), Mexican actor and dancer
- Ernesto Zedillo (in full: Ernesto Zedillo Ponce de León) (born 1951), President of Mexico 1994–2000
- Manuel Barbachano Ponce (1924–1994), Mexican film producer, director, screenwriter, and novelist
- Manuel Ponce (1882–1948), Mexican composer
- Miguel Ángel Ponce (born 1989), Mexican footballer
- Sergio Amaury Ponce (born 1981), Mexican football (soccer) player

== Puerto Rican people ==
- Carlos Ponce (born 1972), Puerto Rican actor, singer, and composer
- Juan Ponce de Leon II (1524–1591), first Puerto Rican to assume governorship of Puerto Rico
- Juan Ponce de León y Loayza, the great-grandson of Spanish conquistador Juan Ponce de Leon and founder of the city of Ponce in Puerto Rico

== Spanish people ==
- Antonio Ponce de Santa Cruz, Spanish cartographer, instrument maker and historian.
- Angela Ponce, first transgender woman in Miss Universe
- Juan Ponce de León (1460–1521), Spanish explorer and conquistador of the New World
- Luis Ponce de León (1527–1591), Spanish poet and Augustinian friar
- Mateo de la Mata Ponce de León ([?]–1720), Spanish colonial officer, interim viceroy of Peru 1716
- Pedro Ponce de León (1520–1584), Spanish Benedictine monk, established a school for the deaf

== Other people ==
- Camilo Ponce Enríquez (politician) (1912–1976), President of Ecuador 1956–1960
- Gustavo Ponce (b. 1952), Venezuelan mathematician
- Jorge Elias Ponce, Honduran middle-distance runner
- Juan Federico Ponce Vaides (1889–1956), Guatemalan politician, acting president 1944
- Manuel María Ponce Brousset (1874–1966), President of Peru for two days in 1930
- Marcelino Ponce Martínez, Vice President of Honduras
- Ebontius also known as "Poncio", French saint and Bishop of Barbastro
