= Obed Enamorado =

Honduran footballer (born 1985)

Personal information
- Full name: Obed Israel Enamorado Palacios
- Date of birth: 15 September 1985 (age 41)
- Place of birth: Tela, Honduras
- Height: 1.83 m (6 ft 0 in)
- Position: Goalkeeper

Team information
- Current team: Real Sociedad
- Number: 1

Youth career
- Vida

Senior career*
Years	Team	Apps	(Gls)
2007–	Vida		

International career^{‡}
2008	Honduras U-23	3	(0)
- * Club domestic league appearances and goals as of 8:46, 8 August 2011 (UTC) ‡ National team caps and goals as of 8:54, 19 July 2011 (UTC)

Obed Israel Enamorado Palacios (born 15 September 1985) is a Honduran footballer who currently plays as a goalkeeper for Liga Nacional de Honduras club Vida.

== Club career ==
He was the only keeper to be ever-present in the 2011 Apertura season.

== International career ==
Enamorado played for the Honduras national football team at the 2008 Summer Olympics.

== Career statistics ==
Club	Season	League		Continental		Total	
Club	Season	Apps	Goals	Apps	Goals	Apps	Goals
Vida	2011–12	1	0	–	–	1	0

== Personal life ==
On 2 April 2014, Obed's girlfriend Diana Vallecillo was killed in a car accident when on her way to Tegucigalpa.
