= Luis Garrido =

Honduran footballer (born 1990)

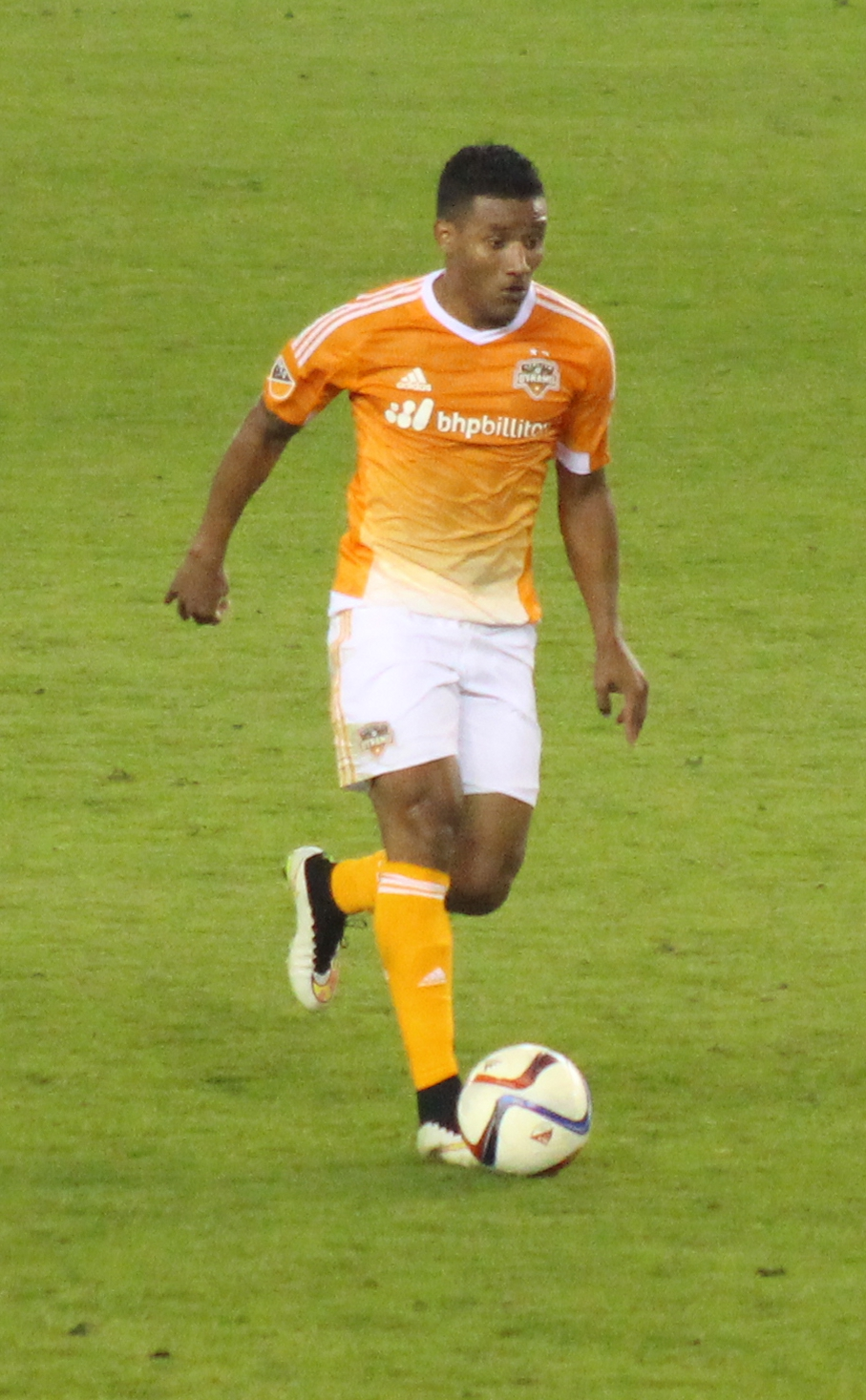

Personal information
- Full name: Luis Fernando Garrido
- Date of birth: November 5, 1990 (age 36)
- Place of birth: Juticalpa, Honduras
- Height: 1.68 m (5 ft 6 in)
- Position: Midfielder

Youth career
- Juticalpa

Senior career*
| Years | Team | Apps | (Gls) |
| 2007 | Juticalpa | | |
| 2008–2017 | Olimpia | 68 | (0) |
| 2011 | → Deportes Savio (loan) | 14 | (0) |
| 2013 | → Red Star Belgrade (loan) | 10 | (0) |
| 2014–2015 | → Houston Dynamo (loan) | 40 | (0) |
| 2018–2020 | Alajuelense | 73 | (0) |
| 2019–2020 | Córdoba | 1 | (0) |
| 2020–2022 | Marathón | 55 | (1) |
| 2022–2023 | Real España | 8 | (0) |
| 2023 | Honduras Progreso | 18 | (0) |
| 2023 | Victoria | 7 | (0) |
| 2024 | Pérez Zeledón | 1 | (0) |
| 2025–2026 | Juticalpa | 15 | (0) |

International career^{‡}
| 2007 | Honduras U17 | 6 | (0) |
| 2008–2009 | Honduras U20 | 1 | (0) |
| 2012–2019 | Honduras | 46 | (0) |
- * Club domestic league appearances and goals as of April 12, 2021 ‡ National team caps and goals as of December 24, 2019

Luis Fernando Garrido (born 5 November 1990) is a Honduran professional footballer who plays as a midfielder.

== Club career ==
Born in Juticalpa, Garrido started playing for Juticalpa F.C. in the secondary division when he was 17 years old. By the end of 2007, after his performance in the 2007 FIFA U-17 World Cup he signed a 7-year contract with Olimpia. He made his top-league debut in the 2007–08 Honduran Liga Nacional. He played 6 consecutive seasons with Olimpia, they winning 5 national titles. He spent part of 2011 playing on loan at Deportes Savio.

On 25 January 2013, he agreed to a six-month loan at Red Star Belgrade for the spring 2013 half-season. On 1 February 2013, he was promoted by Red Star Belgrade after he inked his contract for a 6-month loan, with an option to sign a subsequent contract in June 2013 to stay with the club permanently. However at the end of the season Red Star was unable to fulfill the financial demands of Olimpia, so his first experience in Europe came to an end, and subsequently Garrido returned to Olimpia. He played 10 matches in the Serbian SuperLiga and Red Star finished the season runner-up.

On 25 July 2014, he agreed to a loan deal with Houston Dynamo.

== International career ==
As a youth, he was also a "sub" in a 2007 international game against the United States, and later that year played a game for the Honduras national under-17 team against the USA. He played at the 2007 FIFA U-17 World Cup and at the 2012 Summer Olympics.

He made his senior début for Honduras in an October 2012 FIFA World Cup qualification match against Panama. Ever since, he became progressively a key player in the FIFA World Cup qualification matches.

On 17 November 2015, he sustained a horrific knee injury while playing for Honduras in a FIFA World Cup qualification match against Mexico, resulting in the rupture of both PCL and ACL ligaments of his right knee.

== Honours ==
Olimpia

- Liga Nacional de Honduras: 2007–08, 2008–09, 2009–10, 2011–12, 2012–13
