= Mathías Acuña =

Uruguayan footballer (1992–2025)

Personal information
- Full name: Mathías Alexander Acuña Maciel
- Date of birth: 28 November 1992
- Place of birth: Montevideo, Uruguay
- Date of death: 4 January 2025 (aged 32)
- Place of death: Ambato, Ecuador
- Height: 1.74 m (5 ft 9 in)
- Positions: Winger; second striker

Youth career
- Sur 2000
- Liverpool Montevideo
- Danubio
- Boston River
- –2012: El Tanque Sisley

Senior career*
Years	Team	Apps	(Gls)
2012–2016	El Tanque Sisley	52	(6)
2014–2015	→ Central Español (loan)	15	(1)
2017–2019	Fénix	79	(17)
2019	Liverpool Montevideo	18	(3)
2020	Montevideo Wanderers	21	(4)
2021–2022	AEL	34	(9)
2022	Atenas	16	(4)
2022	Rentistas	15	(4)
2023	Boston River	13	(3)
2023–2024	Lamia	15	(3)
2024	Fénix	16	(4)
2024	Mushuc Runa	15	(8)
Total		309	(66)
- * Club domestic league appearances and goals

Mathías Alexander Acuña Maciel (28 November 1992 – 4 January 2025) was a Uruguayan professional footballer who played as a forward.

== Career ==
Before becoming a footballer, Acuña worked as a delivery man and musician. He played for Greek Super League club Lamia in the 2023–24 season.

== Death ==
Acuña's brother Héctor also played football professionally.

Acuña died on 4 January 2025, at the age of 32. The cause of death was suicide. At the time of his death, he was being investigated for domestic abuse.
