= Johnny Palacios =

Honduran footballer (born 1986)

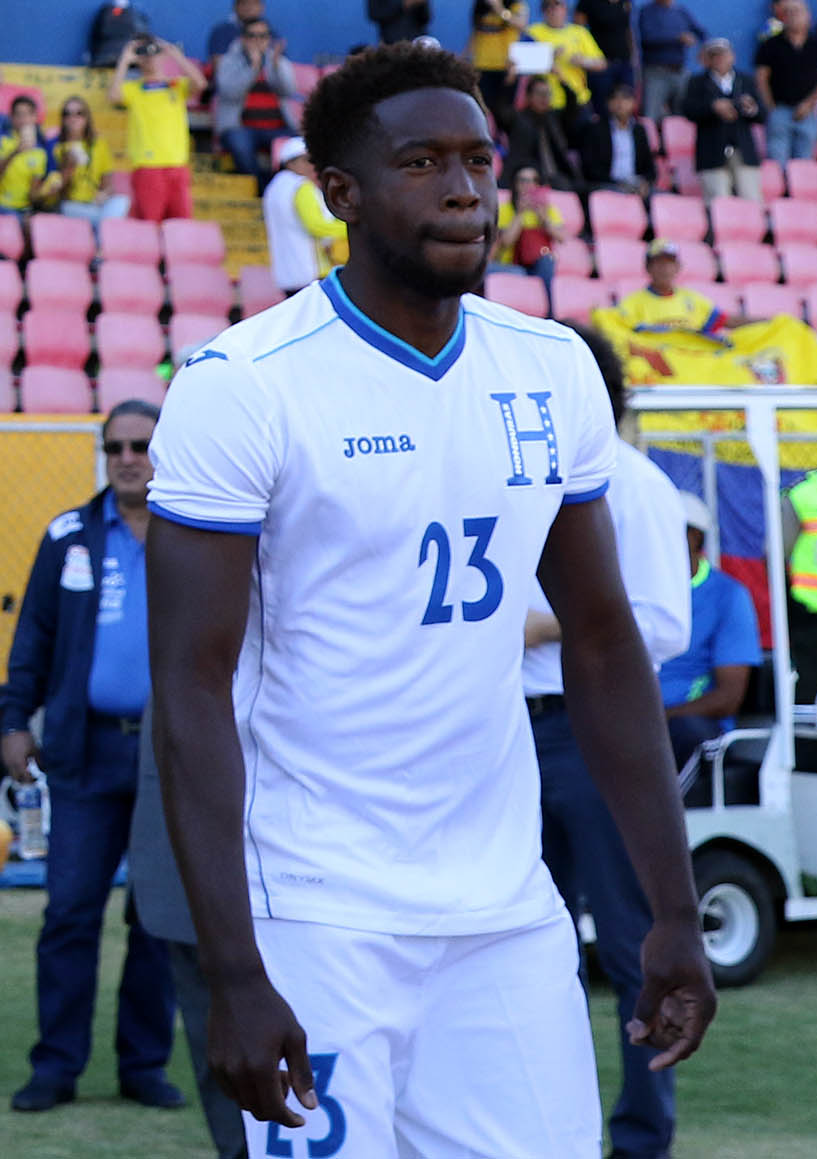
- Palacios with Honduras in 2015

Personal information
- Full name: Johnny Eulogio Palacios Suazo
- Date of birth: 20 December 1986 (age 39)
- Place of birth: La Ceiba, Honduras
- Height: 1.82 m (5 ft 11 1/2 in)
- Position: Defender

Senior career*
Years	Team	Apps	(Gls)
2003–2019	Olimpia	224	(4)

International career^{‡}
2009–2017	Honduras	42	(0)
- * Club domestic league appearances and goals as of 2006 ‡ National team caps and goals as of 24 December 2018

Johnny Eulogio Palacios Suazo (Spanish pronunciation: [ˈɟʝoni paˈlasjos]; born 20 December 1986) is a Honduran former professional footballer who played as a defender.

== Personal life ==
His brothers are Milton, Jerry, Wilson and Edwin René Palacios. On 30 October 2007 Edwin, aged 14, was kidnapped in La Ceiba; he was found dead one year and seven months later in Omoa.

== Club career ==
A one-club man, he has only played professional football for Olimpia so far.

== International career ==
Palacios made his debut for Honduras in a July 2009 CONCACAF Gold Cup match against Grenada and has, as of February 2013, earned a total of 15 caps, scoring no goals. He has represented his country in 1 FIFA World Cup qualification match and played at the 2011 UNCAF Nations Cup as well as at the 2009 CONCACAF Gold Cup.

In the 2010 FIFA World Cup, held in South Africa, Honduras achieved an historical distinction by including brothers Jerry, Johnny, and Wilson in their squad. They became the first trio of brothers to represent a single nation in the World Cup. Johnny however did not play in any match.

== Honours ==
- Liga Nacional de Fútbol de Honduras: 10

Clausura 2008, Clausura 2009, Clausura 2010, Apertura 2011, Clausura 2012, Apertura 2012, Clausura 2013, Clausura 2014, Clausura 2015, Clausura 2016

- Copa Centroamericana: 1

2011
