= Sergio Bica =

Uruguayan footballer (born 1983)

Personal information
- Full name: Sergio Estebán Bica Suárez
- Date of birth: 13 June 1983 (age 43)
- Place of birth: Tacuarembó, Uruguay
- Height: 1.77 m (5 ft 9 1/2 in)
- Position: Defender

Team information
- Current team: Marathón

Senior career*
Years	Team	Apps	(Gls)
2001–08	Tacuarembó		
2009	Juventud de Las Piedras		
2009–10	River Plate	9	(0)
2010–12	Real España	16	(4)
2013–14	River Plate	1	(0)
2014–present	Marathón	18	(0)
- * Club domestic league appearances and goals as of 11 May 2014

Sergio Estebán Bica Suárez (born 13 June 1983) is an Uruguayan footballer who currently plays as defender for Marathón.
