= Jerry Palacios =

Honduran footballer (born 1981)

Personal information
- Full name: Jerry Nelson Palacios Suazo
- Date of birth: 1 November 1981 (age 44)
- Place of birth: La Ceiba, Honduras
- Height: 1.81 m (5 ft 11 1/2 in)
- Position: Forward

Senior career*
Years	Team	Apps	(Gls)
2001–2005	Olimpia	?	(9)
2005–2006	Motagua	23	(5)
2006	Olimpia	12	(4)
2007	Vida	31	(6)
2007–2008	Olimpia	7	(1)
2008–2010	Marathón	39	(18)
2010	Hangzhou Greentown	15	(2)
2011	Hunan Billows	23	(6)
2012	Marathón	10	(2)
2012	Platense	21	(6)
2013–2014	Alajuelense	29	(15)
2015–2016	ATM	2	(0)
2016	Real Sociedad	16	(6)
2016–2017	Vida	25	(3)
2018	Real de Minas	10	(1)
2019	Belmopan Bandits	1	(0)

International career^{‡}
2002–2014	Honduras	26	(5)
- * Club domestic league appearances and goals as of 14 October 2014 ‡ National team caps and goals as of 14 October 2014

Jerry Nelson Palacios Suazo (Spanish pronunciation: [ˈɟʝeri paˈlasjos]; born 1 November 1981) is a Honduran former footballer who played as a striker.

== Club career ==
Palacios made his senior debut for Olimpia for whom he played 7 successive years except for a season at F.C. Motagua and a season at Vida.

He signed for Chinese Super League side Hangzhou Greentown in January 2010. He had a failed trial in South China in the Hong Kong First Division League.

After the Chinese season ended he returned to Marathón for the 2012 Clausura championship. In July 2012 he joined Platense for the 2012 Apertura and in December 2012 he moved abroad again to play for Costa Rican side Alajuelense.

Palacios returned to Asia at the end of 2014, this time joining Malaysian club ATM FA. In January 2016 Palacios joined Real Sociedad.

In January 2019, Palacios joined Belmopan Bandits in Belize.

== International career ==
Jerry Palacios made his debut for Honduras in a March 2002 friendly match against the USA and has, as of February 2013, earned a total of 13 caps, scoring 5 goals. He has represented his country in 4 FIFA World Cup qualification matches.

In the 2010 FIFA World Cup, held in South Africa, Honduras achieved an historical distinction by including Jerry, Johnny, and Wilson in their squad. They became the first trio of brothers to represent a single nation in the World Cup. He was included in the squad after the injury of Julio César de León.

=== International goals ===
N.	Date	Venue	Opponent	Score	Result	Competition
1.	3 August 2004	Estadio Cuscatlán, San Salvador, El Salvador	El Salvador	2–0	4–0	Friendly match
2.	3 August 2004	Estadio Cuscatlán, San Salvador, El Salvador	El Salvador	3–0	4–0	Friendly match
3.	3 August 2004	Estadio Cuscatlán, San Salvador, El Salvador	El Salvador	4–0	4–0	Friendly match
4.	23 January 2010	The Home Depot Center, Carson, United States	United States	2–0	3–1	Friendly match
5.	5 March 2014	Estadio Olímpico Metropolitano, San Pedro Sula, Honduras	Venezuela	2–1	2–1	Friendly match

== Personal life ==
He is the brother of Milton, Wilson, Johnny and Edwin Palacios. On 30 October 2007 Edwin, aged 14, was kidnapped in La Ceiba. He was found dead one year and seven months later in Omoa.
