= Christopher Rapalo =

American photographer and film-maker

- Born: Miami, Florida, U.S.
- Occupations: Photographer, filmmaker, and owner of Miami production company, Third Dream Media
- Years active: 2016-Present
- Known for: Filmmaker
- Notable work: Retro Couture

Christopher Rapalo is a photographer, filmmaker, and owner of Miami production company, Third Dream Media. He is known for his debut documentary, Retro Couture (2016) which debuted at the Miami Fashion Film Festival and has gone onto international film festivals.
