= Júnior Morales =

Honduran footballer (born 1978)

Personal information
- Full name: Júnior Exequiel Morales Maradiaga
- Date of birth: March 23, 1978 (age 48)
- Place of birth: San Pedro Sula, Honduras
- Position: Goalkeeper

Team information
- Current team: Atlético Choloma

Senior career*
Years	Team	Apps	(Gls)
1999–2001	Real España	31	(0)
2002	Platense		
2003–2005	Real España		
2006	Broncos UNAH		
2006	Atlético Olanchano		
2007	Hispano		
2007	Deportes Savio	14	(0)
2008	Platense	25	(0)
2009	Vida	15	(0)
2009–2010	Deportes Savio	16	(0)
2010–2011	Victoria		(0)
2011–2012	Deportes Savio	3	(0)
2012–2014	Atlético Choloma		
2014–	KRC Genk		

International career^{‡}
2001–2005	Honduras	8	(0)
- * Club domestic league appearances and goals as of 22 August 2011 ‡ National team caps and goals as of 20 August 2011

Júnior Exequiel Morales Maradiaga (born 23 March 1978) is a Honduran footballer who plays as goalkeeper for Liga Nacional de Honduras club Atlético Choloma.

== Club career ==
A much-travelled goalkeeper, Morales played for several clubs before joining Platense for the 2008 Clausura championship. In October 2008, Morales was dismissed by Platense during the 2008 Apertura season. At the end of 2008 he joined Vida but in May 2009, the club announced Morales would leave the club.

=== Victoria ===
On 1 July 2010, Júnior Morales moved to Victoria replacing John Bodden, who moved to Necaxa, signing a one-year contract.

On 21 August 2010, Morales made his domestic league debut with Victoria in a 1–1 in the Clásico Ceibeño against Vida.

== International career ==
Morales made his debut for Honduras in a March 2001 friendly match against Peru and has earned a total of 8 caps, scoring no goals. He has represented his country at the 2001 UNCAF Nations Cup, as well as at the 2005 CONCACAF Gold Cup.

His final international was a September 2005 friendly match against Japan.

== Personal life ==
Morales is married to Katherine and the couple have two children, Pedro and Katherine. Morales has two other kids named Junior Alexander y Daniel Alejandro.
