= Arnold Peralta =

Honduran footballer (1989–2015)

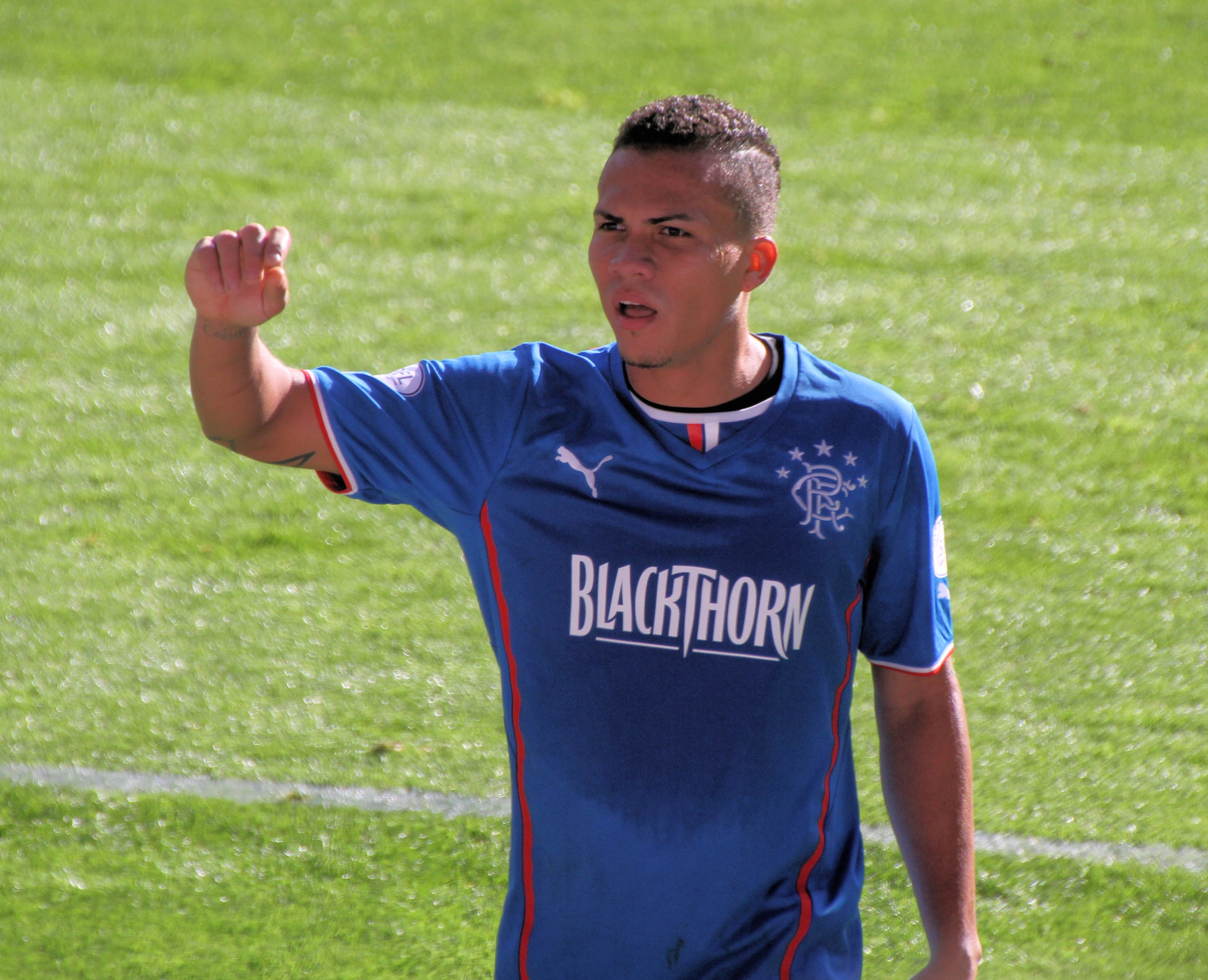
- Peralta with Rangers in 2013

Personal information
- Full name: Arnold Fabián Peralta Sosa
- Date of birth: 29 March 1989
- Place of birth: La Ceiba, Honduras
- Date of death: 10 December 2015 (aged 26)
- Place of death: La Ceiba, Honduras
- Height: 1.73 m (5 ft 8 in)
- Position: Midfielder

Senior career*
Years	Team	Apps	(Gls)
2008–2013	Vida	114	(2)
2013–2015	Rangers	24	(1)
2015	Olimpia	23	(1)
Total		161	(4)

International career
2009	Honduras U20	3	(1)
2010	Honduras U21	2	(0)
2011–2012	Honduras U23	9	(0)
2011–2015	Honduras	26	(0)
- * Club domestic league appearances and goals as of 11 December 2015

Arnold Fabián Peralta Sosa (29 March 1989 – 10 December 2015) was a Honduran footballer who played as a defensive midfielder.

He began his career at Vida in 2008, and five years later he joined the Scottish club Rangers, where he won the Scottish League One in 2013–14. After being released in January 2015, he returned to his homeland with Olimpia. Peralta was a full international with 26 caps for the Honduras national football team from his debut in 2011, representing the nation at the 2012 Olympics, although he was not selected for the 2014 FIFA World Cup squad due to injury.

He was shot dead on 10 December 2015 in his hometown of La Ceiba. He was buried in Jardines de Paz Ceibeños cemetery.

== Club career ==
=== Vida ===
Born in La Ceiba, Peralta began his career in 2008 with his hometown LINA club Vida.

=== Rangers ===
In June 2013, Peralta agreed to join the Scottish club Rangers on a four–year deal, subject to receiving a work permit. He was eligible to play once Rangers' player registration embargo was lifted on 1 September 2013. Peralta scored his first goal for Rangers in a friendly against Dundee. Already crowned Scottish League One champions, his first competitive goal came against Stranraer on 26 April 2014, a 3–0 win at Ibrox which saw Rangers pass 100 points in the season.

On 21 January 2015, Rangers announced that Peralta's contract had been terminated by mutual consent. He went on trial with Kazakhstan's Shakhter Karagandy, but did not earn a contract.

=== Olimpia ===
Peralta later returned to his home country after signing for Olimpia.

== International career ==
Peralta was the Honduran Under-20 captain. He helped his country qualify for the 2009 FIFA World Youth Championship, in Egypt, in which he played three games scoring against eventual third place team from Hungary. He also participated in the 2012 Summer Olympics, making his debut on 26 July in a 2–2 draw against Morocco at Hampden Park, Glasgow.

He made his senior debut for Honduras in a September 2011 friendly match against Paraguay and represented his country in seven FIFA World Cup qualification matches, as well as playing at the 2013 Copa Centroamericana. He missed Honduras' 2014 FIFA World Cup attempt due to injury. He appeared 26 times for his country.

== Death ==
Peralta died after being fatally shot outside a shopping mall in his hometown of La Ceiba on 10 December 2015, at the age of 26. He was hit by eighteen bullets, and police ruled out robbery as a motive.

Two days later, a minute of silence was observed at Ibrox before a Scottish Championship game between Rangers and Morton.

== Career statistics ==
=== Club ===
Appearances and goals by club, season and competition
Club	Season	League			National Cup		League Cup		Continental		Other		Total	
Club	Season	Division	Apps	Goals	Apps	Goals	Apps	Goals	Apps	Goals	Apps	Goals	Apps	Goals
Vida	2008–09	Liga Nacional	21	0	-		-		-		-		21	0
Vida	2009–10	Liga Nacional	20	0	-		-		-		-		20	0
Vida	2010–11	Liga Nacional	26	0	-		-		-		-		26	0
Vida	2011–12	Liga Nacional	24	0	-		-		-		-		24	0
Vida	2012–13	Liga Nacional	23	2	-		-		-		-		23	2
Vida	Total		114	2	-	-	-	-	-	-	-	-	114	2
Rangers	2013–14	Scottish League One	20	1	4	0	0	0	-		2	0	26	1
Rangers	2014–15	Scottish Championship	4	0	0	0	1	0	-		0	0	5	0
Rangers	Total		24	1	4	0	1	0	-	-	2	0	31	1
Olimpia	2014–15	Liga Nacional	9	0			-		2	0	-		11	0
Olimpia	2015–16	Liga Nacional	14	1			-		2	0	-		16	1
Olimpia	Total		23	1			-	-	4	0	-	-	27	1
Career total			161	4	4	0	1	0	4	0	2	0	172	4

=== International ===
Honduras
Year	Apps	Goals
2011	1	0
2012	5	0
2013	13	0
2014	3	0
2015	4	0
Total	26	0

== Honours ==
Rangers

- Scottish League One: 2013–14
