= Héctor Acuña =

Uruguayan footballer (born 1981)

Personal information
- Full name: Héctor Fabián Acuña Maciel
- Date of birth: 27 October 1981 (age 45)
- Place of birth: Montevideo, Uruguay
- Position: Forward

Senior career*
Years	Team	Apps	(Gls)
2000–2002	Rampla Juniors		
2003–2004	Rentistas		
2005	Santiago Morning	15	(6)
2006–2007	Rentistas		
2007	Shelbourne FC	–	(–)
2007–2010	Liverpool Montevideo	44	(12)
2008–2009	→ Sinaloa (loan)	40	(7)
2010	Miramar Misiones	14	(2)
2011	Racing Montevideo	10	(1)
2011	Marathón	11	(2)
2012	Cerrito	7	(4)
2012	El Tanque Sisley	15	(11)
2013	Gimnasia LP	3	(0)
2013–2014	Cerro	25	(20)
2014–2015	Deportes Tolima	33	(5)
2015–2017	Defensor Sporting	42	(6)
2018	Cerro	22	(3)
2019	Rentistas	21	(4)
2020–2021	Miramar Misiones	26	(10)
2022–2023	Porongos	–	(–)
2023	Deutscher	3	(0)
- * Club domestic league appearances and goals

Héctor Fabián Acuña Maciel (born 27 October 1981) is a Uruguayan former professional footballer who played as a forward.

== Personal life ==
In January 2025 Acuña's brother Mathías, who also was a professional footballer, died.

== Career ==
- (Uruguay) Rampla Juniors 2000–2002
- (Uruguay) Rentistas 2002–2004
- (Chile) Santiago Morning 2005
- (Uruguay) Rentistas 2006–2007
- (Republic of Ireland) Shelbourne FC 2007
- (Uruguay) Liverpool 2007–2008
- (Uruguay) Sinaloa 2008–2009
- (Uruguay) Liverpool 2010
- (Uruguay) Miramar Misiones 2010
- (Uruguay) Racing Club de Montevideo 2011
- (Honduras) Marathón 2011
- (Uruguay) Cerrito 2012
- (Uruguay) El Tanque Sisley 2012
- (Argentina) Gimnasia y Esgrima La Plata 2013
- (Uruguay) Cerro 2013–2014
- (Colombia) Deportes Tolima 2014–2015
- (Uruguay) Defensor Sporting 2015–2017
- (Uruguay) Cerro 2018
- (Uruguay) Rentistas 2019
- (Uruguay) Miramar Misiones 2020–2021
- (Uruguay) Porongos 2022–2023
- (Uruguay) Deutscher 2023

== Honours ==
- Santiago Morning 2005 (Chilean Primera B Championship)
- Deportes Tolima 2014 (Copa Colombia)
