= Miguel Antonio Zúniga =

Honduran politician

Miguel Antonio Zúniga is a Honduran politician. He serves as Honduras's Minister of Development and Social Inclusion.
