= Reynaldo Tilguath =

Honduran footballer (born 1979)

Personal information
- Full name: Reynaldo Antonio Tilguath Flores
- Date of birth: 4 August 1979 (age 47)
- Place of birth: Tegucigalpa, Honduras
- Height: 1.80 m (5 ft 11 in)
- Position: Midfielder

Youth career
- Olimpia

Senior career*
Years	Team	Apps	(Gls)
1999–2008	Olimpia		
2002	Platense	38	(10)
2008–2009	Motagua	25	(2)
2009–2014	Olimpia	16	(1)
2014-2015	Vida	10	(0)

International career^{‡}
1998–2000	Honduras U20	4	(2)
2003	Honduras	1	(0)
- * Club domestic league appearances and goals as of 20:27, 27 July 2011 (UTC) ‡ National team caps and goals as of 8:54, 19 July 2011 (UTC)

Reynaldo Antonio Tilguath Flores (born 4 August 1979) is a Former Honduran footballer who last played with Social Deportivo Vida

== Club career ==
Nicknamed el Chino, Tilguath spent the whole of his career at Olimpia, except for a season at city rivals F.C. Motagua and a short spell at Platense. He returned to Olimpia from Motagua citing never to play for Motagua anymore after a fight with Motagua president Pedro Atala.

== International career ==
Tilguath participated in the 1999 FIFA World Youth Championship in Nigeria. He made his senior debut for Honduras in an April 2003 friendly match against Paraguay, in which he came on as a late sub for Edgar Álvarez. The match proved to be his only international game ever.
