= Julio Rodríguez (footballer, born 1977) =

Uruguayan footballer

Personal information
- Full name: Julio Pablo Rodríguez Cristóbal
- Date of birth: 9 August 1977 (age 49)
- Place of birth: Juan Lacaze, Uruguay
- Height: 1.79 m (5 ft 10 in)
- Positions: Attacking midfielder; forward

Senior career*
Years	Team	Apps	(Gls)
1999	Libertad San Carlos	–	(–)
1999–2002	Huracán Buceo	55	(10)
2002–2003	Nacional	28	(5)
2003–2004	Fénix	9	(0)
2004	Deportivo Maldonado	8	(0)
2004–2005	Grêmio	12	(2)
2005	Incheon United	8	(0)
2005–2006	Defensor Sporting	6	(0)
2006	Ponte Preta	10	(2)
2006–2008	Montevideo Wanderers	22	(7)
2008	Alki Larnaca	4	(0)
2008	Deportes Antofagasta	15	(1)
2009–2010	Montevideo Wanderers	27	(1)
2010–2015	Real España	176	(30)
2016–2017	Central Español	18	(5)

International career
2001	Uruguay	1	(0)

Managerial career
- 2020: Honduras Progreso
- 2022: Oriental
- 2023: Real España
- * Club domestic league appearances and goals

Julio Pablo Rodríguez Cristóbal (born August 9, 1977, in Juan Lacaze, Uruguay) is a former Uruguayan footballer.

== Club career ==
In 2008, Rodríguez played for Deportes Antofagasta in the Chilean Primera División.

On 7 August 2010, Rodriguez made his debut in the Liga Nacional de Futbol de Honduras with Real España against Vida in a 1–3 win. He left them in April 2015.

== Coaching career ==
In 2020, Rodríguez coached Honduras Progreso. Back to Uruguay, he coached Oriental in 2022.

In 2023, he returned to Honduras and led Real España until August of the same year.
