= Wilson Palacios =

Honduran footballer (born 1984)

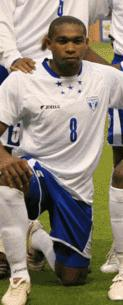
- Palacios with Honduras in 2008

Personal information
- Full name: Wilson Roberto Palacios Suazo
- Date of birth: 29 July 1984 (age 42)
- Place of birth: La Ceiba, Honduras
- Height: 1.78 m (5 ft 10 in)
- Position: Defensive midfielder

Youth career
- 2000–2002: Victoria

Senior career*
Years	Team	Apps	(Gls)
2002–2008	Olimpia	102	(32)
2007–2008	→ Birmingham City (loan)	7	(0)
2008–2009	Wigan Athletic	37	(0)
2009–2011	Tottenham Hotspur	65	(1)
2011–2015	Stoke City	38	(0)
2016	Miami FC	18	(0)
2018–2019	Olimpia	3	(0)
2019	Real Sociedad	9	(0)
Total		279	(33)

International career
2003–2014	Honduras	97	(5)
- * Club domestic league appearances and goals

Wilson Roberto Palacios Suazo (Spanish pronunciation: [ˈwilsom paˈlasjos]; (Note: In isolation, Wilson is pronounced [ˈwilson].) born 29 July 1984) is a Honduran former professional footballer who played as a defensive midfielder.

Born in La Ceiba, he played for Victoria and Olimpia in Honduras before moving to England, where he played for Birmingham City and Wigan Athletic. In 2009, he joined Tottenham Hotspur, generally playing central defensive midfield as he did for Wigan, though he was occasionally used as a right midfielder for Spurs. In August 2011, Palacios joined Stoke City for an undisclosed fee believed to be around £6 million. He struggled to make an impact in his four seasons at Stoke, however, and left the club in 2015. He subsequently had a spell in the North American Soccer League with Miami, before returning to Honduras where he played for Olimpia and Real Sociedad. He retired in December 2019.

He was a regular player for Honduras from 2003 to 2014, helping them qualify for and playing at the 2010 and 2014 FIFA World Cups.

== Club career ==
=== Olimpia ===
Palacios, along with brothers Milton, Jerry, Johnny and Edwin, started his career as a footballer with Victoria, from which all five players were later transferred to Olimpia.

Palacios made 102 appearances and scored 32 goals for Olimpia. He became one of the idols of the team and quickly started to attract international attention after winning five league titles with Olimpia in the 2002–03 Apertura tournament, as well as the 2003–04 Clausura, 2004–05 Clausura, 2005–06 Apertura and the 2005–06 Clausura tournaments. He is especially remembered for scoring a goal from the half-way line against Marathón in the final minutes of a game in 2006 to win the 2005–06 Clausura tournament to become champions of Honduras.

After having a very successful career in Honduras, Palacios looked to make his name in the European leagues. On 14 July 2007, Palacios announced that he would travel to Serbia for a couple of months for a trial with Red Star Belgrade. He stayed for less than a month and despite impressing during his stay, he did not join the club after Red Star refused to pay a salary of, reportedly, US$1.5 million for a three-year contract. Palacios also had trials with Cagliari, AS Monaco, and Arsenal.

=== Birmingham City (loan) ===
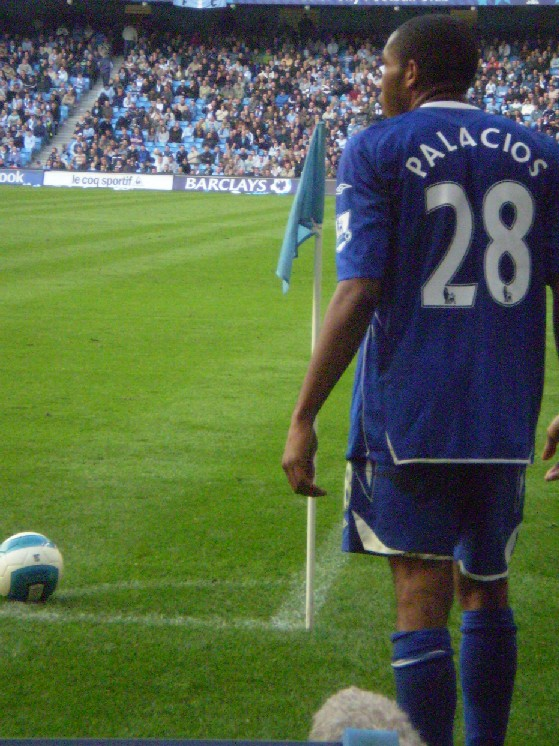
Palacios preparing to take a corner kick for Birmingham

After a recommendation from Arsenal's manager, Arsène Wenger, Premier League club Birmingham City gave Palacios a trial which proved successful, and he signed a six-month loan on 31 August 2007. He made his debut on 22 September in a goalless draw with Liverpool at Anfield, and in October, manager Steve Bruce, who likened Palacios to a young Paul Ince, said that Birmingham intended to make his loan a permanent transfer. However, Bruce left for Wigan Athletic, and the player's absence following his brother's kidnap meant that new manager Alex McLeish had not seen enough of him to sign him permanently.

=== Wigan Athletic ===
On 11 January 2008, Palacios re-joined Bruce at Wigan Athletic for an undisclosed fee, and made his debut the following day against Derby County. He became an important piece in Bruce's system and was linked to the likes of Manchester United, Liverpool, Bayern Munich and Real Madrid. On 16 January 2009, Bruce stated that a deal with Tottenham Hotspur for Palacios was "virtually agreed"; he said Palacios leaving would be "like losing his right arm" and did not want to part with "one of the best midfield players in the country." The deal was confirmed five days later.

=== Tottenham Hotspur ===
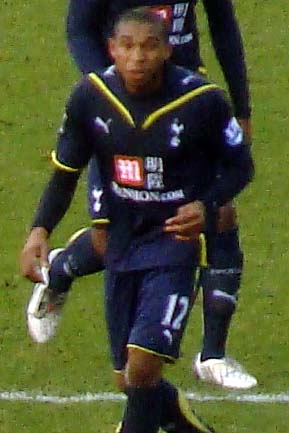
Palacios playing for Spurs

Despite having reservations about moving to London from the north-west of England where he was settled, Palacios agreed personal terms on a 5 1/2-year contract with Tottenham Hotspur, committing his future to the club until 2014. On 21 January 2009, the club announced to the London Stock Exchange that they had agreed a fee of £12 million for Palacios and that the player had passed his medical, but that the transfer could only be completed once he received a work permit. He made his Tottenham debut in a 3–2 defeat to Bolton Wanderers on 31 January, and assisted with the second goal after Bolton goalkeeper Jussi Jääskeläinen parried Palacios' shot and Darren Bent put in the rebound.

His battling performance in his second match, against local rivals Arsenal, earned him the man of the match award, since when he had some excellent performances in the Spurs midfield. He was cup-tied for the 2009 Football League Cup Final. Palacios scored his first goal in English football against Hull City on 19 August 2009 after a through ball by Robbie Keane. After scoring, Palacios pointed towards the sky in honour of his murdered brother Edwin, whose body had been found earlier in the year. Manager Harry Redknapp appreciated Palacios' ability to make Tottenham difficult to play against, comparing his style and effectiveness to that of Graham Roberts some 25 years earlier. During the 2009–10 season, he played 43 matches for Tottenham and helped the club reach the UEFA Champions League for the first time. The following season, Palacios was restricted to 16 starts in the Premier League, though he did play a key role in Tottenham's run to the quarter-final of the Champions League.

=== Stoke City ===
Palacios joined Stoke City on 31 August 2011, signing a four-year contract for an undisclosed fee, reported as £6 million; his Spurs team-mate Peter Crouch also joined Stoke on the same day. Both made their debuts in a 1–0 win against Liverpool on 10 September. The start to his Stoke career, however, was restricted by a knee injury and tonsillitis, and he eventually made his first league start on 21 December away at Manchester City. Palacios was never a regular that season, although he did start the majority of the team's European fixtures. Manager Tony Pulis revealed that his fitness level and a long-standing knee injury had been the problem and that the fans would not see the best of him before he had undergone a full pre-season training schedule. However, in 2012–13, he was unable to get into the starting line-up; he made just four league appearances, all as a substitute.

Palacios was named by Mark Hughes to start the first match of the 2013–14 season, away at Liverpool, but he pulled out after feeling ill in the warm-up and was taken to hospital where he underwent what was described as a minor surgical procedure. Palacios enjoyed more playing time under Hughes in 2013–14, playing 21 times as Stoke finished ninth in the Premier League. Stoke tried to sell Palacios in the summer of 2014 to Middle Eastern club Qatar SC, but that club reported that he failed a medical. Hughes selected Palacios just five times for the matchday squad in the 2014–15 season; on each occasion, he was an unused substitute. He was released at the end of the season, having made 53 appearances in four years. Stoke chairman Peter Coates defended his signing: "He was such a good player at Wigan and Spurs, where he only lost his place to [Luka] Modrić. We certainly thought at the time we were getting a very good player, but for whatever reason it hasn't worked out. I know he has had personal problems in the past – his brother was kidnapped and killed in 2009 – but sometimes you just don't know the reason why things don't work out. It's a great shame because it has cost us a huge amount of money, but it's also a shame for the player because his career hasn't developed either. We all lost. He did, we did."

=== Later career ===
Following his release from Stoke, Palacios went on trial at Hull City, though he did not sign with the club. On 10 December 2015, Palacios joined newly formed North American Soccer League club Miami FC. He made 18 appearances during the 2016 season before being released in November 2016.

He returned to Honduras where he played for his former club, Olimpia, and for Real Sociedad. In December 2019, he announced his retirement from playing with the intention of becoming a players' agent.

== International career ==
Palacios wore the number 8 jersey with the Honduras national team. He made his debut for the senior squad in an April 2003 friendly against Paraguay and went on to play 97 matches with Honduras, scoring four goals, in an international career lasting from 2003 to 2014. Together with David Suazo, Palacios is one of the best known Honduran international players.

In the 2010 FIFA World Cup in South Africa, Honduras achieved a historical distinction by including Jerry, Johnny and Wilson Palacios in their squad. They became the first trio of brothers to represent a single nation in the World Cup.

Palacios was sent off in the first half of their opening game of the 2014 World Cup against France for two bookable offences; Honduras went on to lose 3–0.

== Personal life ==
Palacios is the brother of Milton, Jerry, Johnny and Edwin. On 30 October 2007, his brother Edwin, then aged 14, was kidnapped by five armed men from the family home in La Ceiba. In November 2007, the family paid a £125,000 ransom and it was reported that Edwin had been released, but this proved not to be the case. In January 2009, Palacios' mother made a televised appeal for the kidnappers to open communication with the family, expressing her need to find out if Edwin was still alive, her fears that Palacios' big-money transfer to Tottenham would only strengthen the kidnappers' demands, and a request for help from the British authorities. She stressed that Palacios' team received the transfer fee but the player had only his salary, and that the family's situation was distressing for him.

On 8 May 2009, following a confession from two leaders of the 18th Street gang, police found a body in the municipality of El Paraíso which they believed to be the remains of Edwin. Palacios returned home to Honduras the next day on compassionate leave. On 28 May, the body was confirmed as that of Edwin, and his funeral was held the following day in La Ceiba. On 30 May, despite his loss, Wilson Palacios joined up with the national team to train in preparation for the World Cup qualifying games against the United States and El Salvador.

In September 2011, Palacios had his car confiscated by Staffordshire Police after he failed to provide them with his driving licence.

== Career statistics ==
=== Club ===
Appearances and goals by club, season and competition
Club	Season	League			National cup		League cup		Continental		Total	
Club	Season	Division	Apps	Goals	Apps	Goals	Apps	Goals	Apps	Goals	Apps	Goals
Olimpia	2001–02	Liga Nacional Honduras	9	0	—		—		—			
Olimpia	2002–03	Liga Nacional Honduras	12	2	—		—		—			
Olimpia	2003–04	Liga Nacional Honduras	17	3	—		—		—			
Olimpia	2004–05	Liga Nacional Honduras	24	3	—		—		—			
Olimpia	2005–06	Liga Nacional Honduras	33	11	—		—		—			
Olimpia	2006–07	Liga Nacional Honduras	37	13	—		—		—			
Olimpia	Total		132	32	—		—		—		132	32
Birmingham City (loan)	2007–08	Premier League	7	0	0	0	0	0	—		7	0
Wigan Athletic	2007–08	Premier League	16	0	1	0	0	0	—		17	0
Wigan Athletic	2008–09	Premier League	21	0	1	0	2	0	—		24	0
Wigan Athletic	Total		37	0	2	0	2	0	0	0	41	0
Tottenham Hotspur	2008–09	Premier League	11	0	0	0	0	0	1	0	12	0
Tottenham Hotspur	2009–10	Premier League	33	1	7	0	3	0	—		43	1
Tottenham Hotspur	2010–11	Premier League	21	0	1	0	1	0	8	0	31	0
Tottenham Hotspur	Total		65	1	8	0	4	0	9	0	86	1
Stoke City	2011–12	Premier League	18	0	1	0	1	0	8	0	28	0
Stoke City	2012–13	Premier League	4	0	0	0	0	0	—		4	0
Stoke City	2013–14	Premier League	16	0	1	0	4	0	—		21	0
Stoke City	2014–15	Premier League	0	0	0	0	0	0	—		0	0
Stoke City	Total		38	0	2	0	5	0	8	0	53	0
Miami FC	2016	North American Soccer League	18	0	0	0	0	0	0	0	18	0
Olimpia	2017–18	Liga Nacional Honduras	3	0	0	0	0	0	0	0	3	0
Real Sociedad	2018–19	Liga Nacional Honduras	9	0	0	0	0	0	0	0	9	0
Career total			279	33	12	0	11	0	17	0	319	33

=== International ===
Appearances and goals by national team and year
National team	Year	Apps	Goals
Honduras	2003	5	0
Honduras	2004	10	0
Honduras	2005	12	1
Honduras	2006	6	1
Honduras	2007	13	0
Honduras	2008	11	2
Honduras	2009	10	0
Honduras	2010	6	0
Honduras	2011	2	0
Honduras	2012	6	0
Honduras	2013	11	1
Honduras	2014	5	0
Total		97	5

Scores and results list Honduras's goal tally first, score column indicates score after each Palacios goal.

List of international goals scored by Wilson Palacios
No.	Date	Venue	Opponent	Score	Result	Competition
1	21 February 2005	Estadio Mateo Flores, Guatemala City, Guatemala	Belize	4–0	4–0	UNCAF Nations Cup 2005
2	6 September 2006	Estadio Tiburcio Carías Andino, Tegucigalpa, Honduras	El Salvador	2–0	2–0	Friendly
3	4 June 2008	Estadio Olímpico Metropolitano, San Pedro Sula, Honduras	Puerto Rico	2–0	4–0	2010 FIFA World Cup qualification
4	14 June 2008	Estadio Juan Ramón Loubriel, Bayamón, Puerto Rico	Puerto Rico	2–2	2–2	2010 FIFA World Cup qualification
5	10 September 2013	Estadio Tiburcio Carías Andino, Tegucigalpa, Honduras	Panama	2–2	2–2	2014 FIFA World Cup qualification

== Honours ==
CD Olimpia

- Liga Nacional de Fútbol de Honduras (5): 2002–03 Apertura, 2003–04 Clausura, 2004–05 Clausura, 2005–06 Apertura, 2005–06 Clausura

Individual

- Tottenham Hotspur F.C. Supporters Clubs' Best Team Player: 2009–10
