= Jorge Elias Ponce =

Honduran middle-distance runner

Jorge Elias Ponce is a Honduran former middle distance runner. Ponce is known for holding the Honduran records in the 800m, 1500m, and 5000m. He competed in the 1500m at the World Championships.

== See also ==
- List of Honduran records in athletics
