= Donis Escober =

Honduran football goalkeeper (born 1981)

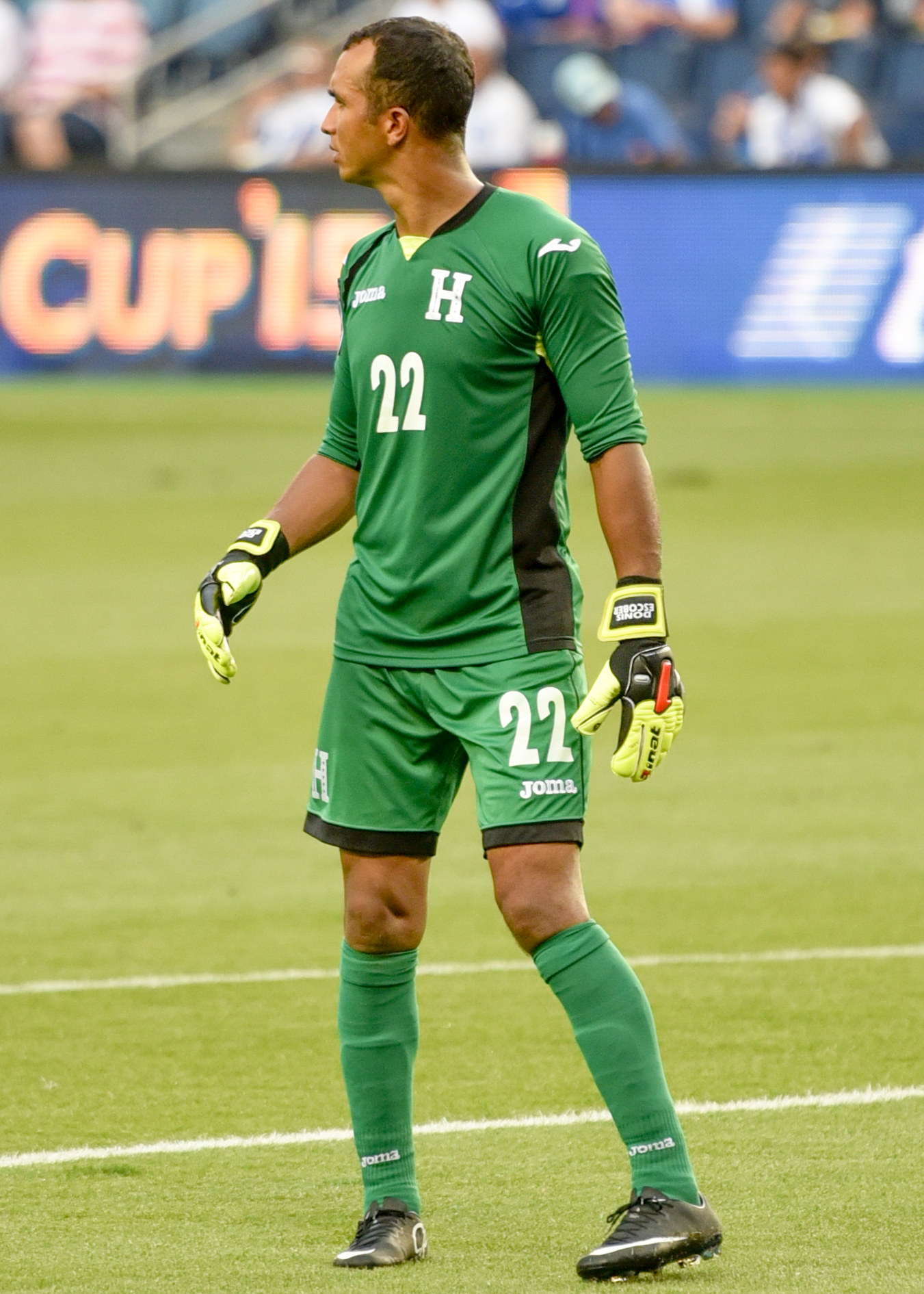

Personal information
- Full name: Donis Salatiel Escober Izaguirre
- Date of birth: 3 February 1981 (age 45)
- Place of birth: San Ignacio, Honduras
- Height: 1.80 m (5 ft 11 in)
- Position: Goalkeeper

Youth career
- Juventud Olimpíca

Senior career*
Years	Team	Apps	(Gls)
2001–2019	Olimpia	222	(0)

International career^{‡}
2002–2019	Honduras	63	(0)
- * Club domestic league appearances and goals as of 11 July 2019 ‡ National team caps and goals as of 12 November 2017

Donis Salatiel Escober Izaguirre (born 3 February 1981) is a Honduran retired football goalkeeper.

== Club career ==
Born in San Ignacio, Escober started at Olimpia's youth side Juventud Olímpica and has played his entire professional career for Olimpia.

In March 2012, Escober was on the verge of breaking Motagua's Nicaraguan goalkeeper Róger Mayorga's 36 years old-record of 838 minutes without conceding a goal in the Honduran league. He did not make it in the end, after being beaten by a Marathón goal that left Escober only 35 minutes short of Mayorga's record. After the 2018–19 Liga Nacional de Honduras came to an end, Escober announced that he would not continue with Olimpia and that he would retire from football.

== International career ==
Escober made his debut for Honduras in a May 2002 friendly match against Japan and has, as of January 2013, earned a total of 17 caps. He has represented his country in 2 FIFA World Cup qualification matches and played at the 2003 and 2007 UNCAF Nations Cups as well as at the 2009 and was a non-playing squad member at the 2011 CONCACAF Gold Cup and the 2010 FIFA World Cup in South Africa. He played in the 2018 CONCACAF-AFC playoff against Australia in both legs, but failed to qualify for the 2018 FIFA World Cup with Honduras.

He has been an understudy to Noel Valladares for most of his international career.
