= Julián Rápalo =

Honduran footballer (born 1986)

Personal information
- Full name: Julián Mauricio Rápalo Agüero
- Date of birth: 9 August 1986 (age 40)
- Place of birth: Villanueva, Cortés Honduras
- Position: Midfielder

Team information
- Current team: Marathón
- Number: 13

Youth career
- Marathón

Senior career*
Years	Team	Apps	(Gls)
2004–2005	Marathón		
2005	Villanueva		
2008–2012	Deportes Savio	86	(9)
2012–	Marathón		

International career
–2005	Honduras U-20		
- * Club domestic league appearances and goals

Julián Mauricio Rápalo Agüero (born 9 August 1986) is a Honduran footballer who currently plays for Marathón.

== Club career ==
In summer 2011, clubs like Platense and Victoria were reportedly interested in Rápalo but he chose to stay with Savio. He rejoined his youth team Marathón for the 2012 Apertura.

== International career ==
He was part of the Honduran U-20 team at the 2005 World Youth Championship in the Netherlands.
