= Yobani Ávila =

Honduran footballer (born 1976)

Personal information
- Full name: Edwin Yobani Ávila Martínez
- Date of birth: October 26, 1976 (age 50)
- Place of birth: La Ceiba, Honduras
- Height: 1.82 m (6 ft 0 in)
- Position: Leftback

Team information
- Current team: Platense

Senior career*
Years	Team	Apps	(Gls)
2001–2004	Olimpia		
2004–2005	Platense		
2005–2009	Olimpia		
2010	Zacapa	14	(1)
2010–2011	Real España		
2011	Victoria		
2012	Marathón		
2012–	Platense		

International career^{‡}
2010	Honduras	1	(0)
- * Club domestic league appearances and goals as of 2007 ‡ National team caps and goals as of 25 August 2012

Edwin Yobani Ávila Martínez (born October 26, 1976) is a Honduran football defender who currently plays for Platense in the Liga Nacional de Honduras.

== Club career ==
Nicknamed Zancudo Ávila has played a large part of his career for Olimpia in Liga Nacional de Honduras. He also had spells with Platense and Real España as well as in Guatemala with Zacapa.

In summer 2011 he announced to leave Real España while still on a six months contract after receiving an offer from Olimpia but España did not have the intention to let him go. In the end he had to return to España after a transfer to Olimpia or a foreign club did not materialise. Espana then decided to sack him and he joined Victoria for the 2011 Apertura.

In December 2011 he announced he would play the 2012 Clausura for Marathón. He rejoined Platense for the 2012 Apertura.

== International career ==
Ávila made his debut for Honduras aged 34 in a December 2010 friendly match against Panama which proved to be his only international game.

== Personal life ==
Born in La Ceiba, he now lives in Puerto Cortes. He is the son of former Honduran Olympic footballer Victoria Óscar García and the half-brother of national team winger Oscar Boniek García and former Motagua player Samir García.
