= Christian Martínez (Honduran footballer) =

Honduran footballer (born 1990)

Personal information
- Full name: Christian Samir Martínez Centeno
- Date of birth: 8 September 1990 (age 36)
- Place of birth: La Ceiba, Honduras
- Height: 1.80 m (5 ft 11 in)
- Position: Striker

Youth career
- Victoria
- Cagliari
- 2008: Rio Ave

Senior career*
Years	Team	Apps	(Gls)
2009	Peñarol	0	(0)
2009–2012	Real España	31	(8)
2012–2014	Motagua	10	(0)
2014–	Marathón	13	(3)

International career^{‡}
2007	Honduras U-17	6	(1)
2008–2009	Honduras U-20	3	(0)
2010–	Honduras	2	(0)
- * Club domestic league appearances and goals as of 10 August 2014 ‡ National team caps and goals as of 27 September 2009

Christian Samir Martínez Centeno (born 8 September 1990) is a Honduran footballer who most recently played as a striker for F.C. Motagua.

== Club career ==
Still a youngster, Martínez was bought by Serie A's Cagliari, arriving from Victoria. He would leave after just one season, having gathered no first-team appearances.

In the summer of 2008, Martínez joined Portugal's Rio Ave, although he spent the season with its junior side. Then he left for Peñarol, hoping to gain more first-team experience, but returned home after a few weeks, joining Real España. In August 2012, he signed for F.C. Motagua.

== International career ==
Internationally, Martínez participated in the 2007 Pan American Games in Rio de Janeiro, also attending the 2007 FIFA U-17 World Cup in South Korea, scoring against Spain. He also played for Honduras at the 2009 FIFA U-20 World Cup in Egypt.

Martinez made his senior debut for Honduras in a September 2010 friendly match against El Salvador and has, as of January 2013, earned a total of 2 caps, scoring no goals.
