= Ramón Villeda Bermúdez =

Honduran politician

Ramón Villeda Bermúdez (10 May 1937, Santa Rosa de Copán – 20 July 2012) was a Honduran veterinarian and Liberal Party politician. He has held several important positions in administration, including President of the Banco Nacional de Desarrollo Agrícola (1998-2000) and Vice President of the Congreso Nacional de Honduras (2004-2005) and Director at the Banco Central de Honduras from 2010 until his death in 2012.
