= Julio César de León =

Honduran footballer (born 1979)

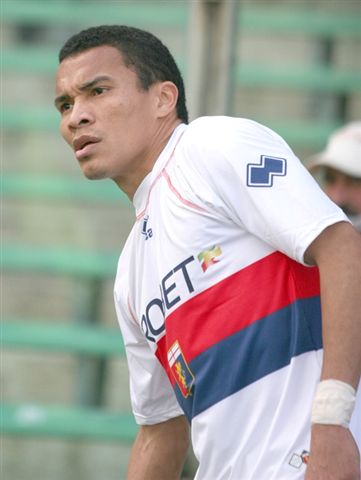
- Julio César with Genoa in 2008

Personal information
- Full name: Julio César de León Dailey
- Date of birth: 13 September 1979 (age 47)
- Place of birth: Puerto Cortes, Honduras
- Height: 1.74 m (5 ft 9 in)
- Position: Attacking midfielder

Team information
- Current team: CD Atlético Junior

Senior career*
Years	Team	Apps	(Gls)
1996–2000	Platense	74	(18)
2000	Atlético Celaya	0	(0)
2001	Olimpia	12	(2)
2001	Deportivo Maldonado		
2001–2006	Reggina	65	(5)
2004	→ Fiorentina (loan)	4	(0)
2004	→ Catanzaro (loan)	7	(1)
2005	→ Sambenedettese (loan)	16	(8)
2005	→ Avellino (loan)	12	(1)
2006	→ Teramo (loan)	12	(4)
2007–2008	Genoa	50	(8)
2008–2010	Parma	32	(6)
2009–2010	→ Torino (loan)	21	(3)
2010–2011	Shandong Luneng	26	(5)
2011–2012	Motagua	13	(2)
2012–2013	Messina	7	(1)
2013	Real Sociedad	11	(2)
2013–2016	Platense	18	(12)
2016	Miami United	7	(5)
2017	Municipal Limeño	17	(2)
2017	Miami United		
2017–2018	Olancho		
2018–2021	Platense		
2022	San Juan		
2022	CD Atlético Junior		

International career^{‡}
1999–2011	Honduras	83	(14)
- * Club domestic league appearances and goals as of 2 April 2017 ‡ National team caps and goals as of 2 April 2017

Julio César de León Dailey (Latin American Spanish: [ˈxuljo ˈsesaɾ ðe leˈon]; (Note: In isolation, de León is pronounced [de leˈon].) born 13 September 1979) is a former Honduran professional footballer who played [ as a midfielder. He was known for being a free-kick specialist and was an important key for the Honduras national football team.

== Club career ==
=== Early career ===
Nicknamed Rambo, he made his debut for C.D. Platense in 1996 against Real Maya of Tegucigalpa, scoring his first National Soccer League goal. His last goal in the Honduras National League was playing for Olimpia on 26 May 2001 against Club Broncos of Choluteca. Earning a good reputation in Honduras, de León moved abroad to Mexico's First Division, where he played for Atletico Celaya.

After the season was over, Atletico Celaya did not renew his contract, so he returned to Honduras and became part of C.D. Olimpia of Tegucigalpa. Once he finished his one-year contract with Olimpia, he left for Uruguay where he played shortly for Deportivo Maldonado.

=== Reggina ===
From there, de León moved to Reggina of Serie B in Italy. De León started off very well for his new club. With his goals and assists, "Rambo" helped his team to regain a place in the Italy's Serie A. Once in the first division, de León's participation was intermittent, partly due to the acquisition of the Japanese international Shunsuke Nakamura. De León was relegated to the bench, playing on and off as a substitute player.

The following seasons in Italy proved to be frustrating for "Rambo". He was sent on loan back to Serie B where he played for a number of teams, including Fiorentina, Teramo and Catanzaro. His lack of playing time continued to such degree, that he was sent to the third division or Serie C1, where he played for Sambenedettese. In 2006, "Rambo" was requested by coach Mazzarri to come back to Reggina. De León was given a new chance, and he took it. For a while de León was considered the team's most valuable player.

=== Genoa ===
However, on 16 January 2007, de León was transferred by Reggina again, this time in a permanent deal to Genoa of Serie B, for €3.2 million, along with Filippo Carobbio (co-ownership), hoping that his services would help the team to regain a spot in Serie A. The fans of Reggina disapproved of the sale of de León, in a time when the team really needed his talent. But the president of the team, Lillo Foti, justified the sale with economic reasons: "The offer was good and it was something that we could not refuse.".

On 10 June 2007, de León's new team, Genoa, did regain a spot in Serie A, tying at home with Napoli 0–0. After this, his last game of the season, and some subsequent celebrations, de León quickly traveled to Houston, Texas where the Honduras national team would play Cuba on 13 June 2007. He helped Honduras reach the quarter-finals of the 2007 CONCACAF Gold Cup.

=== Parma ===
He was awarded the 'Player of the Season' award by Genoa. but eventually sold to Parma of Serie B for €2.9 million,; Parma player Andrea Gasbarroni (€2M) and Magnus Troest (50% rights for €1.5M) moved to opposite side as part of the deal. His Genoa team-mate Alessandro Lucarelli (€1.2M) also joined the Emilia–Romagna side.

He scored his first goal for the team on 28 November 2008 after a perfectly executed free kick to the corner. Then, he made his second and third goals against Grosseto on 14 February 2009 in Parma's 4–0 victory. He scored his fourth goal for the club on 17 March 2009 against A.C. Mantova in the 82nd minute to put Parma up 1–0 and eventually win the match. His fifth goal was a long-range free kick effort against Pisa F.C. to make the match 2–0 and almost guarantee promotion for Parma into Serie A. On 16 May 2009, Julio César de León celebrated the fifth promotion of his career, this time with Parma. He finished the season with a total of six goals and also contributed several assists, which proved vital for their return to Serie A.

After having not played for Parma in the first two games, on 28 August 2009, he was loaned to Torino in Serie B along with Manuel Coppola, as part of Nicola Amoruso deal. He missed the promotion playoffs of Toro due to international call-up.

=== From Shandong Luneng to Messina to Real Sociedad ===
At the start of 2010–11 Serie A he was sold to Shandong Luneng for just €775. In the 2011–2012 season he has played for F.C. Motagua. In 2012, he played for Messina in the Italian Serie D and then moved to newly promoted C.D. Real Sociedad in Honduras.

== International career ==
De León played at the 1999 World Youth Cup and made his senior debut for Honduras in a May 1999 friendly match against Haiti. As of December 2012, he has earned a total of 83 caps, scoring 14 goals. He has represented his country in 34 FIFA World Cup qualification matches and played at the 2003 UNCAF Nations Cup as well as at the 2000, 2003 and 2007 CONCACAF Gold Cups.

De León also competed for Honduras at the 1999 Pan American Games and 2000 Summer Olympics. and he also was part of the memorable squad in 2001 that defeated Brazil 2–0 and came third in the Copa América.

On 20 August 2008 he scored an excellent goal against Mexico to make the score 1–0 for Honduras in the first half of the match, but this goal wasn't enough to draw Pável Pardo's two goals that he scored later in the game. However, shortly after, in October 2008, "Rambo" was excluded from the squad by head coach Reinaldo Rueda due to injury. Julio César de León announced he was returning to Italy shortly after arriving in Miami, Florida to join the national team for the match against Canada. Upon arrival, he lashed out against the National Team for being inadequately equipped to treat an injury that he had suffered in Italy. The coach had a discussion with him in the hotel and he was sent back on another plane shortly after. After long amounts of speculation, he returned to the squad in February 2009 where he was not reported to have any later problems.

De León was originally named in the 23-men final 2010 FIFA World Cup squad, but on 15 June, one day before the opening match of Honduras, had to pull out due to injury and was replaced by Jerry Palacios, who he was given the opportunity to play alongside his two brothers.

== Career statistics ==
Scores and results list Honduras' goal tally first.

N.	Date	Venue	Opponent	Score	Result	Competition
1.	16 December 1999	Estadio Olímpico Metropolitano, San Pedro Sula, Honduras	Zambia	3–0	7–1	Friendly match
2.	17 June 2000	Stade Sylvio Cator, Port-au-Prince, Haiti	Haiti	3–1	3–1	2002 FIFA World Cup qualification
3.	28 March 2001	Estadio Olímpico Metropolitano, San Pedro Sula, Honduras	United States	1–1	1–2	2002 FIFA World Cup qualification
4.	11 February 2003	Estadio Rommel Fernández, Panama City, Panama	Nicaragua	2–0	2–0	2003 UNCAF Nations Cup
5.	15 July 2003	Estadio Azteca, Mexico City, Mexico	Brazil	1–2	1–2	2003 CONCACAF Gold Cup
6.	18 February 2004	Estadio Tiburcio Carías Andino, Tegucigalpa, Honduras	Colombia	1–0	1–1	Friendly match
7.	18 August 2004	Estadio Alejandro Morera Soto, Alajuela, Costa Rica	Costa Rica	2–1	5–2	2006 FIFA World Cup qualification
8.	7 October 2006	Lockhart Stadium, Fort Lauderdale, United States	Guatemala	2–2	3–2	Friendly match
9.	12 September 2007	Estadio Olímpico Metropolitano, San Pedro Sula, Honduras	Ecuador	2–1	2–1	Friendly match
10.	4 June 2008	Estadio Olímpico Metropolitano, San Pedro Sula, Honduras	Puerto Rico	1–0	4–0	2010 FIFA World Cup qualification
11.	20 August 2008	Estadio Azteca, Mexico City, Mexico	Mexico	1–0	1–2	2010 FIFA World Cup qualification
12.	10 October 2009	Estadio Olímpico Metropolitano, San Pedro Sula, Honduras	United States	1–0	2–3	2010 FIFA World Cup qualification
13.	10 October 2009	Estadio Olímpico Metropolitano, San Pedro Sula, Honduras	United States	2–3	2–3	2010 FIFA World Cup qualification
14.	27 May 2010	Stadion Villach Lind, Villach, Austria	Belarus	1–0	2–2	Friendly match

== Honours ==
C.D. Platense

- Honduran Cup: 1996, 1997

Shandong Luneng

- 2010 Chinese Super League
