= 2014–15 C.D. Motagua season =

Motagua
2014–15 season
- Chairman: Julio Gutiérrez
- Manager: Diego Vásquez
- Apertura: Champions
- Clausura: Runner-up
- Cup: Third place
- Top goalscorer: League: Castillo (29); All: Castillo (31)
- Highest home attendance: 34,169
- Lowest home attendance: 1,482
- Average home league attendance: 5,325
Home colours	Away colours	Third colours
- All statistics correct as of 24 May 2015.

The 2014–15 season was F.C. Motagua's 68th season in existence and the club's 49th consecutive season in the top fight of Honduran football.

== Overview ==
Despite being eliminated early last season, the club's board of directors confirmed the continuity of coach Diego Vásquez for the start of the 2014–15 season. On 24 April 2014, Jorge Claros, Eduardo Sosa, Víctor Ortiz and Luis Castro were separated from the club. On 19 May 2014, Pedro Atala announced his resignation after 9 years as the club's president. Julio Gutiérrez took charge on July. On 8 November, Júnior Izaguirre reached 300 games playing for the club, a record at the time; he also scored the winning goal that night in the 2–1 home win over C.D. Victoria. On 7 December, the club qualified for their first final after six tournaments being absent. On 20 December, with a 2–1 aggregate over C.D. Real Sociedad, Motagua conquered its 13th national title by winning the 2014–15 Apertura season.

== Players ==
=== Transfers in ===
Player	Contract date	Moving from
(Argentina) Lucas Gómez	26 April 2014	Universidad de Costa Rica
(Honduras) Cristian Hernández	5 January 2015	(Honduras) Valle
(Brazil) Israel Silva	13 January 2015	(Guatemala) Antigua
(Argentina) Ricardo Rosales	29 January 2015	(Argentina) Godoy Cruz

=== Transfers out ===
Player	Released date	Moving to
(Colombia) Luis Castro	24 April 2014	(Honduras) Vida
(Honduras) Jorge Claros	24 April 2014	(United States) Sporting Kansas City
(Honduras) Víctor Ortiz	24 April 2014	(Honduras) Vida
(Argentina) Eduardo Sosa	24 April 2014	(Argentina) Unión Aconquija
(Uruguay) José Varela	30 May 2014	(Uruguay) Rentistas
(Honduras) David Molina	7 July 2014	Retired
(Uruguay) Maximiliano Lombardi	11 July 2014	(Peru) Los Caimanes
(Honduras) Dembor Bengtson	16 January 2015	(Honduras) Olimpia
(Honduras) Deybi Flores	24 February 2015	(Canada) Vancouver Whitecaps

=== Squad ===
- Statistics as of 24 May 2015

A#	C#	Pos.	Player	DoB	As of 2013–14		2014–15		Totals	
1	1	GK	(Argentina) Sebastián Portigliatti	1 March 1985 (aged 29)	18	0	33	0	51	0
2	2	DF	(Honduras) Juan Montes	26 October 1985 (aged 28)	18	1	30	0	48	1
3	3	DF	(Honduras) Henry Figueroa	28 December 1992 (aged 21)	35	1	35	1	70	2
4	4	DF	(Honduras) Júnior Izaguirre	12 August 1979 (aged 34)	326	33	38	4	364	37
5	5	DF	(Honduras) Marcelo Pereira	27 May 1995 (aged 19)	0	0	9	0	9	0
6	6	MF	(Honduras) Marvin Barrios	22 February 1994 (aged 20)	41	2	26	0	67	2
7	7	MF	(Honduras) Carlos Discua	20 September 1984 (aged 29)	97	21	43	17	140	38
8	8	DF	(Honduras) Orlin Peralta	12 February 1990 (aged 24)	22	0	22	0	44	0
9	9	FW	(Honduras) Román Castillo	20 November 1991 (aged 22)	19	5	44	29	63	34
–	10	FW	(Brazil) Israel Silva	24 June 1981 (aged 33)	0	0	14	3	14	3
11	11	FW	(Argentina) Lucas Gómez	6 October 1987 (aged 26)	0	0	42	16	42	16
12	12	MF	(Honduras) Reinieri Mayorquín	13 July 1989 (aged 24)	13	1	30	1	43	2
14	14	MF	(Honduras) Irvin Reyna	7 June 1987 (aged 27)	13	0	42	1	55	1
16	16	MF	(Honduras) Kevin Maradiaga	19 January 1994 (aged 20)	0	0	6	0	6	0
17	17	MF	(Honduras) Júnior Padilla	4 April 1992 (aged 22)	50	4	17	0	67	4
18	18	DF	(Honduras) Wilmer Crisanto	24 June 1989 (aged 25)	18	0	39	2	57	2
19	19	DF	(Honduras) César Oseguera	20 July 1990 (aged 23)	56	5	35	0	91	5
21	21	MF	(Honduras) Klifox Bernárdez	18 September 1994 (aged 19)	0	0	7	0	7	0
22	–	MF	(Honduras) Ramón Amador	23 January 1994 (aged 20)	3	0	3	0	7	0
23	23	MF	(Honduras) Deybi Flores	16 June 1996 (aged 18)	9	0	13	0	22	0
24	24	DF	(Honduras) Omar Elvir	28 September 1989 (aged 24)	80	2	41	2	121	4
25	25	GK	(Honduras) Marlon Licona	9 February 1991 (aged 23)	27	0	13	0	40	0
26	–	DF	(Honduras) José García	23 December 1990 (aged 23)	15	0	6	0	21	0
27	–	FW	(Honduras) Dembor Bengtson	3 September 1994 (aged 19)	4	0	2	0	6	0
–	27	MF	(Argentina) Ricardo Rosales	6 June 1993 (aged 21)	0	0	11	1	11	1
33	–	GK	(Honduras) Harold Fonseca	8 October 1993 (aged 20)	0	0	0	0	0	0
34	34	FW	(Honduras) Kevin López	3 February 1996 (aged 18)	1	1	24	1	25	2
48	–	FW	(Honduras) Arnold Meléndez	23 August 1994 (aged 19)	7	0	0	0	7	0
49	28	DF	(Honduras) Joshua Nieto	3 September 1994 (aged 19)	6	0	4	0	10	0
–	57	FW	(Honduras) Foslyn Grant	4 October 1998 (aged 15)	0	0	3	0	3	0
–	–	FW	(Honduras) Marlon Ramírez	17 April 1994 (aged 20)	0	0	4	0	4	0
–	–	GK	(Honduras) Cristian Hernández	9 October 1996 (aged 17)	0	0	0	0	0	0
–	–	FW	(Honduras) Roy Hernández	–	0	0	1	0	1	0
–	–	DF	(Honduras) Maylor Núñez	5 July 1996 (aged 17)	0	0	2	0	2	0
Manager			(Argentina) Diego Vásquez	3 July 1971 (aged 42)	23 November 2013–					

== Results ==
=== Preseason and friendlies ===
20 July 2014 Friendly	León Libertador	0–1	Motagua	Choluteca, Choluteca
		Report	81' Amador	Stadium: Estadio Fausto Flores Lagos

26 July 2014 Friendly	Alianza (El Salvador)	2–2	(Honduras) Motagua	San Salvador, El Salvador
	Díaz; Yeladián		Gómez	Stadium: Estadio Cuscatlán

10 January 2015 Friendly	Dragón (El Salvador)	0–1	(Honduras) Motagua	San Miguel, El Salvador
		Report	79' dos Santos	Stadium: Estadio Juan Francisco Barraza

=== Apertura ===
3 August 2014 Round 1	Real Sociedad	1–1	Motagua	Tocoa, Colón
	Zúniga 32'	Report	37' Elvir	Stadium: Estadio Francisco Martínez Durón; Attendance: 1,700; Referee: Ángel Cruz

10 August 2014 Round 2	Motagua	4–1	Honduras Progreso	Tegucigalpa, Francisco Morazán
	Discua 35' 43' 63'; Castillo 77'	Report	(penalty missed) Isaula; 90' Tejeda	Stadium: Estadio Tiburcio Carías Andino; Attendance: 1,943; Referee: Marlon Díaz
Note: Carlos Discua scored F.C. Motagua's 2000th goal in the league.

17 August 2014 Round 3	Motagua	2–0	Platense	Tegucigalpa, Francisco Morazán
	Gómez 35'; López 78'	Report		Stadium: Estadio Tiburcio Carías Andino; Attendance: 2,691; Referee: Orlando Hernández

24 August 2014 Round 4	Real España	5–0	Motagua	San Pedro Sula, Cortés
	Acosta 31' 47'; Figueroa 71' (o.g.); Róchez 75'; Lobo 85'	Report		Stadium: Estadio Francisco Morazán; Attendance: 4,279; Referee: Melvin Matamoros

31 August 2014 Round 5	Motagua	1–4	Olimpia	Tegucigalpa, Francisco Morazán
	Gómez (penalty missed) 64'	Report	17' Quioto; (penalty missed) Guerra; 39' 45+2' Lozano; 58' Acevedo	Stadium: Estadio Tiburcio Carías Andino; Attendance: 6,185; Referee: Armando Castro

6 September 2014 Round 6	Vida	0–1	Motagua	La Ceiba, Atlántida
		Report	17' Gómez	Stadium: Estadio Nilmo Edwards; Attendance: 2,328; Referee: Miguel Torres

14 September 2014 Round 7	Motagua	0–1	Marathón	Comayagua, Comayagua
		Report	20' Martínez	Stadium: Estadio Carlos Miranda; Attendance: 2,101; Referee: Armando Castro

21 September 2014 Round 8	Victoria	0–2	Motagua	La Ceiba, Atlántida
		Report	42' Discua; 84' Crisanto	Stadium: Estadio Nilmo Edwards; Attendance: 1,532; Referee: Raúl Castro

1 October 2014 Round 9	Motagua	1–1	Parrillas One	Tegucigalpa, Francisco Morazán
	Castillo (pen.), 90+4'	Report	57' Rodríguez	Stadium: Estadio Tiburcio Carías Andino; Attendance: 1,857; Referee: Geovanny Martínez

5 October 2014 Round 10	Motagua	4–1	Real Sociedad	Tegucigalpa, Francisco Morazán
	Gómez 8' 69' 90'; Castillo 45'	Report	28' Tobías	Stadium: Estadio Tiburcio Carías Andino; Attendance: 1,482; Referee: Nelson Salgado

10 October 2014 Round 11	Honduras Progreso	1–1	Motagua	El Progreso, Yoro
	León 21'	Report	56' Gómez	Stadium: Estadio Humberto Micheletti; Attendance: 2,929; Referee: Melvin Matamoros

15 October 2014 Round 12	Platense	2–1	Motagua	Puerto Cortés, Cortés
	Altamirano 17' de León 44' (pen.)	Report	54' (pen.) Discua	Stadium: Estadio Excélsior; Referee: Raúl Castro

19 October 2014 Round 13	Motagua	5–0	Real España	Tegucigalpa, Francisco Morazán
	Reyna 21'; Castillo 38' 81'; Mayorquín 66'; Crisanto 70'	Report		Stadium: Estadio Tiburcio Carías Andino; Referee: Armando Castro

26 October 2014 Round 14	Olimpia	0–1	Motagua	Tegucigalpa, Francisco Morazán
		Report	(penalty missed) Discua; 45' (pen.) Castillo	Stadium: Estadio Tiburcio Carías Andino; Referee: Óscar Moncada

30 October 2014 Round 15	Motagua	1–2	Vida	Tegucigalpa, Francisco Morazán
	Gómez 86'	Report	15' 63' Hernández	Stadium: Estadio Tiburcio Carías Andino; Referee: Miguel Torres

2 November 2014 Round 16	Marathón	3–1	Motagua	San Pedro Sula, Cortés
	Puerto 34'; Barrios 39'; Martínez 52'	Report	55' (pen.) Izaguirre	Stadium: Estadio Olímpico Metropolitano; Referee: Erick Andino

8 November 2014 Round 17	Motagua	2–1	Victoria	Tegucigalpa, Francisco Morazán
	Castillo 19'; Izaguirre 29' (pen.)	Report	6' Crisanto	Stadium: Estadio Tiburcio Carías Andino; Referee: Miguel Torres

15 November 2014 Round 18	Parrillas One	2–2	Motagua	San Pedro Sula, Cortés
	Zavala 26'; Romero 71'	Report	48' Castillo; 72' Elvir	Stadium: Estadio Francisco Morazán; Referee: Geovanny Mendoza

20 November 2014 Playoff	Platense	1–2	Motagua	Puerto Cortés, Cortés
	Aguilar 13'	Report	25' Figueroa; 45' Gómez	Stadium: Estadio Excélsior; Attendance: 1,406; Referee: Orlando Hernández

23 November 2014 Playoff	Motagua	2–1	Platense	Tegucigalpa, Francisco Morazán
	Castillo 74' 90+2'	Report	33' de León	Stadium: Estadio Tiburcio Carías Andino; Referee: Orlando Hernández

30 November 2014 Semifinals	Motagua	1–0	Olimpia	Tegucigalpa, Francisco Morazán
	Discua 21'	Report		Stadium: Estadio Tiburcio Carías Andino; Attendance: 11,864; Referee: Said Martínez

7 December 2014 Semifinals	Olimpia	1–1	Motagua	Tegucigalpa, Francisco Morazán
	Quioto 38'	Report	62' Discua	Stadium: Estadio Tiburcio Carías Andino; Referee: Armando Castro

14 December 2014 Final	Real Sociedad	0–0	Motagua	Tocoa, Colón
		Report		Stadium: Estadio Francisco Martínez Durón; Referee: Óscar Moncada

20 December 2014 Final	Motagua	2–1	Real Sociedad	Tegucigalpa, Francisco Morazán
	Discua 19'; Castillo 44'	Report	36' Munguía	Stadium: Estadio Tiburcio Carías Andino; Attendance: 34,169; Referee: Armando Castro

=== Clausura ===
18 January 2015 Round 1	Platense	2–2	Motagua	Puerto Cortés, Cortés
	Osorio 16'; Cardona 63'	Report	8' Gómez; 12' Discua	Stadium: Estadio Excélsior; Attendance: 2,158; Referee: Said Martínez

25 January 2015 Round 2	Motagua	3–4	Parrillas One	Tegucigalpa, Francisco Morazán
	Castillo 43' 56'; Gómez 59'	Report	44' Bermúdez; 72' Álvarez; 86' Bernárdez; 90+2' López	Stadium: Estadio Tiburcio Carías Andino; Attendance: 2,714; Referee: Nelson Salgado

31 January 2015 Round 3	Marathón	0–2	Motagua	San Pedro Sula, Cortés
		Report	38' 45' Castillo	Stadium: Estadio Francisco Morazán; Attendance: 4,025; Referee: Said Martínez

22 February 2015 Round 4	Motagua	3–1	Honduras Progreso	Tegucigalpa, Francisco Morazán
	Discua 5'; Izaguirre 48' (pen.); Castillo 70'	Report	64' Arriola	Stadium: Estadio Tiburcio Carías Andino; Attendance: 1,922; Referee: Nelson Salgado

15 February 2015 Round 5	Olimpia	3–1	Motagua	Tegucigalpa, Francisco Morazán
	Quioto 47'; Leguizamón 61'; Elis 90'	Report	4' Castillo	Stadium: Estadio Tiburcio Carías Andino; Attendance: 7,927; Referee: Raúl Castro

18 February 2015 Round 6	Victoria	2–2	Motagua	La Ceiba, Atlántida
	Crisanto 19'; Andino 39'	Report	24' Castillo; 75' Silva	Stadium: Estadio Nilmo Edwards; Attendance: 1,419; Referee: Geovanny Mendoza

1 March 2015 Round 7	Motagua	2–2	Real España	Tegucigalpa, Francisco Morazán
	Gómez 68'; Discua 89'	Report	8' (pen.) Cardozo; 25' Martínez	Stadium: Estadio Tiburcio Carías Andino; Attendance: 3,829; Referee: Melvin Matamoros

7 March 2015 Round 8	Vida	0–3	Motagua	La Ceiba, Atlántida
		Report	29' Discua; 44' Castillo; 55' (pen.) Gómez	Stadium: Estadio Nilmo Edwards; Attendance: 3,202; Referee: Raúl Castro

11 March 2015 Round 9	Motagua	3–2	Real Sociedad	Tegucigalpa, Francisco Morazán
	Matute 6' (o.g.); Discua 86'; Silva 90+2'	Report	27' Munguía; 41' (pen.) Clark	Stadium: Estadio Tiburcio Carías Andino; Attendance: 1,973; Referee: Manuel Zelaya

15 March 2015 Round 10	Motagua	2–0	Platense	Tegucigalpa, Francisco Morazán
	Castillo 39'; Gómez 43'	Report		Stadium: Estadio Tiburcio Carías Andino; Attendance: 2,575; Referee: Héctor Rodríguez

21 March 2015 Round 11	Parrillas One	1–2	Motagua	Siguatepeque, Comayagua
	Rodríguez 27'	Report	12' 65' Castillo	Stadium: Estadio Roberto Martínez Ávila; Attendance: 3,596; Referee: Raúl Castro

5 April 2015 Round 12	Motagua	3–0	Marathón	Tegucigalpa, Francisco Morazán
	Castillo 29'; Gómez 45+1'; Rosales 90+2'	Report		Stadium: Estadio Tiburcio Carías Andino; Attendance: 2,445; Referee: Óscar Moncada

8 April 2015 Round 13	Honduras Progreso	0–1	Motagua	El Progreso, Yoro
		Report	72' Castillo	Stadium: Estadio Humberto Micheletti; Attendance: 1,606; Referee: Erick Andino

12 April 2015 Round 14	Motagua	1–1	Olimpia	Tegucigalpa, Francisco Morazán
	Discua 45'	Report	90' Lozano	Stadium: Estadio Tiburcio Carías Andino; Attendance: 11,025; Referee: Óscar Moncada

15 April 2015 Round 15	Motagua	3–0	Victoria	Tegucigalpa, Francisco Morazán
	Discua 41'; Castillo 49' 85'	Report		Stadium: Estadio Tiburcio Carías Andino; Attendance: 1,708; Referee: Armando Castro

18 April 2015 Round 16	Real España	1–2	Motagua	San Pedro Sula, Cortés
	Cardozo 67'	Report	23' Discua; 60' Silva	Stadium: Estadio Francisco Morazán; Attendance: 3,766; Referee: Héctor Rodríguez

25 April 2015 Round 17	Motagua	2–1	Vida	Comayagua, Comayagua
	Castillo 40'; Izaguirre 90' (pen.)	Report	73' Riascos	Stadium: Estadio Carlos Miranda; Attendance: 2,369; Referee: Said Martínez

2 May 2015 Round 18	Real Sociedad	1–0	Motagua	Tocoa, Colón
	Batiz 16'	Report		Stadium: Estadio Francisco Martínez Durón; Attendance: 3,984; Referee: Melvin Matamoros

13 May 2015 Semifinals	Victoria	1–0	Motagua	La Ceiba, Atlántida
	Andino 67' (pen.)	Report		Stadium: Estadio Nilmo Edwards; Attendance: 2,830; Referee: Raúl Castro

16 May 2015 Semifinals	Motagua	3–0	Victoria	Tegucigalpa, Francisco Morazán
	Gómez 17'; Castillo 25' 54'	Report		Stadium: Estadio Tiburcio Carías Andino; Attendance: 3,798; Referee: Héctor Rodríguez

20 May 2015 Final	Motagua	1–2	Olimpia	Tegucigalpa, Francisco Morazán
	Discua 87'	Report	8' (pen.) 27' Lozano	Stadium: Estadio Tiburcio Carías Andino; Attendance: 4,523; Referee: Héctor Rodríguez

24 May 2015 Final	Olimpia	0–0	Motagua	Tegucigalpa, Francisco Morazán
		Report		Stadium: Estadio Tiburcio Carías Andino; Referee: Melvin Matamoros

=== Honduran Cup ===
7 February 2015 Round of 64	Alianza de Becerra	0–1	Motagua	San Francisco, Olancho
			30' Núñez	Stadium: Estadio Alfredo Hawit Banegas; Attendance: 2,500; Referee: Starting XI: 1 – Portigliatti; 4 – Izaguirre; 5 – Pereira; 8 – Peralta; 10 – Silva (substituted off) 67'; 12 – Mayorquín; 16 – Maradiaga (substituted off) 90'; 17 – Padilla (substituted off) 75'; 24 – Elvir (substituted off) 70'; – Núñez; – Ramírez; Substitutes; 11 – Gómez (substituted on) 67'; 19 – Oseguera (substituted on) 70'; 14 – Reyna (substituted on) 75'; – Bernárdez (substituted on) 90'

25 February 2015 Round of 32	Atlético Calvario	1–4	Motagua	Langue, Valle
	Flores 86'		9' Padilla; 46' 61' Castillo; 51' López	Stadium: Estadio Jorge Alberto Arias; Referee: Starting XI: 25 – Licona (substituted off) 65'; 5 – Pereira; 6 – Barrios (substituted off) 67'; 10 – Silva; 16 – Maradiaga (substituted off) 46'; 17 – Padilla; 19 – Oseguera (substituted off) 60'; 21 – Bernárdez; 27 – Rosales; 34 – López; – Núñez; Substitutes; 9 – Castillo (substituted on) 46'; 3 – Figueroa (substituted on) 60'; – Hernández (substituted on) 65'; 12 – Mayorquín (substituted on) 67'

18 March 2015 Round of 16	Atlético Olanchano	1–4	Motagua	Catacamas, Olancho
	Jiménez 15'		6' Gómez; 51' Rosales; 77' Silva; 88' (pen.) Izaguirre	Stadium: Estadio Rubén Guifarro; Referee: Starting XI: 25 – Licona; 2 – Montes; 4 – Izaguirre; 6 – Barrios; 10 – Silva; 11 – Gómez; 14 – Reyna; 17 – Padilla; 19 – Oseguera; 24 – Elvir; 27 – Rosales

25 March 2015 Quarterfinals	Atlético Esperanzano	3–2	Motagua	La Esperanza, Intibucá
	Flores 22'; Ramos 25'; Garay 84' (pen.)		37' Silva; 87' (pen.) Izaguirre	Stadium: Estadio Romualdo Bueso; Referee: Starting XI: 25 – Licona; 2 – Montes; 4 – Izaguirre; 6 – Barrios; 10 – Silva; 12 – Mayorquín; 17 – Padilla; 19 – Oseguera; 21 – Bernárdez; 27 – Rosales; – Ramírez

28 March 2015 Quarterfinals	Motagua	3–0	Atlético Esperanzano	Catacamas, Olancho
	Reyna 29'; Elvir 45'; Gómez 61'			Stadium: Estadio Rubén Guifarro; Referee: Starting XI: 1 – Portigliatti; 2 – Montes; 4 – Izaguirre; 5 – Pereira; 8 – Peralta; 10 – Silva; 11 – Gómez; 14 – Reyna; 24 – Elvir; 27 – Rosales; 34 – López

1 April 2015 Semifinals	Platense	2–1	Motagua	Puerto Cortés, Cortés
	Aguilar 34'; Lalín 49'		85' Izaguirre	Stadium: Estadio Excélsior; Referee: Starting XI: 25 – Licona; 2 – Montes; 4 – Izaguirre; 5 – Pereira; 6 – Barrios; 7 – Discua; 9 – Castillo; 11 – Gómez; 12 – Mayorquín; 14 – Reyna; 24 – Elvir

29 April 2015 Semifinals	Motagua	1–1	Platense	Tegucigalpa, Francisco Morazán
	Izaguirre 59' (pen.)		74' (pen.) Abadía	Stadium: Estadio Tiburcio Carías Andino; Referee: Óscar Moncada Starting XI: 1 – Portigliatti; 2 – Montes (substituted off) 80'; 3 – Figueroa; 4 – Izaguirre; 7 – Discua; 9 – Castillo; 11 – Gómez; 12 – Mayorquín (substituted off) 77'; 14 – Reyna; 18 – Crisanto (substituted off) 60'; 24 – Elvir; Substitutes; 34 – López (substituted on) 60'; 27 – Rosales (substituted on) 77'; 19 – Oseguera (substituted on) 80'

8 May 2015 Third Place	Motagua	4–3	Villanueva	Siguatepeque, Comayagua
	Izaguirre (?); Grant 46'; Rosales 57'; Crisanto 80' (pen.)		45' 69' Zelaya; 55' Oseguera	Stadium: Estadio Roberto Martínez Ávila; Referee: Héctor Rodríguez Starting XI: 1 – Portigliatti; 3 – Figueroa; 4 – Izaguirre; 7 – Discua; 8 – Peralta; 14 – Reyna; 18 – Crisanto; 19 – Oseguera; 24 – Elvir; 28 – Nieto; 57 – Grant
