= 2015–16 C.D. Motagua season =

Motagua
2015–16 season
- Chairman: Eduardo Atala
- Manager: Diego Vásquez
- Apertura: Runner-up
- Clausura: Semifinalist
- Cup: Quarterfinalist
- Supercup: Canceled
- CONCACAF Champions League: Group stage
- Top goalscorer: League: Silva (15); All: Silva (18)
- Highest home attendance: 16,528
- Lowest home attendance: 1,156
- Average home league attendance: 4,004
Home colours	Away colours	Third colours
- All statistics correct as of 15 May 2016.

The 2015–16 season was F.C. Motagua's 69th season in existence and the club's 50th consecutive season in the top fight of Honduran football.

== Overview ==
This season, the club were looking for its 14th league and 2nd domestic cup; as well as it first CONCACAF Champions League. On 7 July, former president Eduardo Atala took charge of the club for his second term after Julio Gutiérrez was forced to resign due to legal matters. On 20 October, a 1–1 draw against Club América meant an early elimination from the 2015–16 CONCACAF Champions League. The Apertura tournament ended with the silver medal when they lost to C.D. Honduras Progreso on penalty shoot-outs after a 4–4 aggregated score in 210 minutes of play. For the Clausura tournament, the club announced that they will be playing all their home games on Saturdays in the evening, instead of the traditional Sundays in the afternoon; seeking for a better response from their local fans. On 31 December, Uruguayan newspaper Ovación Digital announced the results of the annual survey which decides the best teams, players and managers of each Latin American country for 2015, and Motagua, was selected as the best 2015 team in Honduras. For their second season in a row, the team was unsuccessful on conquering the Honduran Cup as they lost to Juticalpa F.C. in the quarterfinals. In the Clausura tournament, they were unable to qualify to their fourth consecutive final under Diego Vásquez's management when they fall short in the semifinals against city rivals Club Deportivo Olimpia.

== Players ==
=== Transfers in ===
Player	Contract date	Moving from
(Honduras) Erick Andino	25 May 2015	(Honduras) Victoria
(Honduras) Félix Crisanto	17 June 2015	(Honduras) Victoria
(Argentina) Santiago Vergara	23 June 2015	(Argentina) Independiente N.
(Honduras) Héctor Castellanos	24 June 2015	(Honduras) Victoria
(Honduras) Keller Andino	26 June 2015	(Honduras) Valle
(Honduras) Eddie Hernández	16 August 2015	(Mexico) Correcaminos
(Honduras) José Fiallos	11 January 2016	(Honduras) Jaguares de UPNFM
(Honduras) Néstor Martínez	12 January 2016	(Honduras) Olimpia

=== Transfers out ===
Player	Released date	Moving to
(Honduras) Carlos Discua	25 May 2015	(Costa Rica) Alajuelense
(Argentina) Ricardo Rosales	26 May 2015	(Argentina) Godoy Cruz
(Honduras) Marlon Ramírez	28 May 2015	TBD
(Honduras) Kevin Maradiaga	28 May 2015	(Honduras) Vida
(Honduras) Ramón Amador	28 May 2015	TBD
(Honduras) Klifox Bernárdez	June 2015	(Honduras) Juticalpa
(Honduras) Júnior Padilla	2 July 2015	(Honduras) Victoria
(Honduras) Rubilio Castillo	4 September 2015	(Mexico) Correcaminos
(Honduras) Marvin Barrios	28 December 2015	(Honduras) Olimpia
(Honduras) Pedro García	28 December 2015	TBD
(Honduras) César Oseguera	5 January 2016	(Honduras) Real España
(Honduras) Eddie Hernández	20 February 2016	(China) Qingdao Jonoon

=== Squad ===
- Statistics as of 15 May 2016
- Only league matches into account

No.	Pos.	Player name	Date of birth and age	Games played			Goals scored		
				14/15	15/16	T	14/15	15/16	T
1	GK	(Argentina) Sebastián Portigliatti	1 March 1985 (aged 30)	51	28	79	0	0	0
2	DF	(Honduras) Juan Montes	26 October 1985 (aged 29)	48	41	89	1	3	4
3	DF	(Honduras) Henry Figueroa	28 December 1992 (aged 22)	70	28	98	2	0	2
4	DF	(Honduras) Júnior Izaguirre	12 August 1979 (aged 35)	364	34	398	37	0	37
5	DF	(Honduras) Marcelo Pereira	27 May 1995 (aged 20)	9	13	22	0	1	1
6	MF	(Honduras) Reinieri Mayorquín	13 July 1989 (aged 25)	43	30	73	2	3	5
7	MF	(Honduras) Erick Andino	21 July 1989 (aged 25)	0	33	33	0	10	10
8	DF	(Honduras) Orlin Peralta	12 February 1990 (aged 25)	44	18	62	0	0	0
9	FW	(Honduras) Rubilio Castillo	20 November 1991 (aged 23)	63	3	66	34	1	35
10	FW	(Brazil) Israel Silva	24 June 1981 (aged 34)	14	37	51	3	15	18
11	FW	(Argentina) Lucas Gómez	6 October 1987 (aged 27)	42	27	69	16	13	29
12	DF	(Honduras) Marvin Barrios	22 February 1994 (aged 21)	67	1	68	2	0	2
12	MF	(Honduras) José Fiallos	28 February 1996 (aged 19)	0	0	0	0	0	0
14	FW	(Honduras) Irvin Reyna	7 June 1987 (aged 28)	55	36	91	1	1	2
15	MF	(Honduras) Maylor Núñez	5 July 1996 (aged 18)	2	0	2	0	0	0
16	MF	(Honduras) Héctor Castellanos	28 December 1992 (aged 22)	0	33	33	0	0	0
17	DF	(Honduras) Denil Maldonado	25 May 1998 (aged 17)	0	1	1	0	0	0
18	DF	(Honduras) Wilmer Crisanto	24 June 1989 (aged 26)	57	39	96	2	3	5
19	DF	(Honduras) César Oseguera	20 July 1990 (aged 24)	91	10	101	5	0	5
19	MF	(Honduras) Eli Reyna	11 September 1996 (aged 18)	0	0	0	0	0	0
21	FW	(Honduras) Foslyn Grant	4 October 1998 (aged 16)	3	9	12	0	1	1
22	MF	(Argentina) Santiago Vergara	15 September 1991 (aged 23)	0	41	41	0	8	8
23	FW	(Honduras) Pedro García	2 March 1997 (aged 18)	0	1	1	0	0	0
23	MF	(Honduras) Néstor Martínez	4 May 1992 (aged 23)	0	5	5	0	0	0
24	DF	(Honduras) Omar Elvir	28 September 1989 (aged 25)	121	36	157	4	2	6
25	GK	(Honduras) Marlon Licona	9 February 1991 (aged 24)	40	16	56	0	0	0
26	DF	(Honduras) Henry Güity	24 June 1996 (aged 19)	0	4	4	0	0	0
27	DF	(Honduras) Félix Crisanto	9 September 1990 (aged 24)	0	32	32	0	1	1
28	MF	(Honduras) Joshua Nieto	3 September 1994 (aged 20)	10	8	18	0	0	0
29	FW	(Honduras) Keller Andino	2 July 1995 (aged 19)	0	1	1	0	0	0
30	FW	(Honduras) Eddie Hernández	27 February 1991 (aged 24)	35	18	53	7	11	18
31	DF	(Honduras) Harrison Bernárdez	14 May 1997 (aged 18)	0	2	2	0	0	0
32	MF	(Honduras) Everson López	3 November 2000 (aged 14)	0	0	0	0	0	0
33	GK	(Honduras) Cristian Hernández	22 September 1996 (aged 18)	0	0	0	0	0	0
34	FW	(Honduras) Kevin López	3 February 1996 (aged 19)	25	22	47	2	5	7
Manager		(Argentina) Diego Vásquez	3 July 1971 (aged 43)	23 November 2013–					

== Results ==
=== Preseason and friendlies ===
12 July 2015 Friendly	Juticalpa	1–1 (3–5 p)	Motagua	Juticalpa, Olancho
15:00 (UTC−06:00)	Padilla 37'		62' Elvir	Stadium: Estadio Juan Ramón Brevé Vargas
	Penalties
	Paz (penalty scored); Ocampo (penalty scored); Lanza (penalty scored); Ramírez (penalty missed)		(penalty scored) Izaguirre; (penalty scored) Peralta; (penalty scored) Gómez; (penalty scored) Elvir; (penalty scored) López

19 July 2015 Copa Ciclón	Motagua (Honduras)	1–1 (4–3 p)	(Costa Rica) Saprissa	Tegucigalpa, Honduras
16:30 (UTC−06:00)	Izaguirre 15' (pen.)		75' Escoe	Stadium: Estadio Tiburcio Carías Andino
	Penalties
	Izaguirre (penalty missed); Gómez (penalty scored); Peralta (penalty missed); Oseguera (penalty scored); López (penalty scored); Montes (penalty scored)		(penalty scored) Imperiale; (penalty scored) Soto; (penalty missed) Smith; (penalty scored) Del Campo; (penalty missed) Rodríguez; (penalty missed) Escoe

23 July 2015 Friendly	Lepaera	1–1	Motagua	Lepaera, Lempira
(UTC−06:00)	Róchez 4'		32' Gómez	Stadium: Estadio Juan Orlando Hernández

25 July 2015 Friendly	Graciano	1–8	Motagua	Gracias, Lempira
(UTC−06:00)			(?) (?) (?) (?) Gómez (?) López (?) Oseguera (?) Castellanos (?) Andino	Stadium: Estadio Marco Augusto Hernández

26 July 2015 Friendly	Pasaquina (El Salvador)	1–3	(Honduras) Motagua	La Unión, El Salvador
14:30 (UTC−06:00)	Salamanca 58'		17' Crisanto; 23' Reyna; 67' Silva	Stadium: Estadio San Sebastián

1 August 2015 Friendly	Motagua	0–1	Olimpia	New Orleans, United States
18:30 (UTC−05:00)			54' Quioto	Stadium: Tad Gormley Stadium; Attendance: ≈15,000

26 January 2016 Friendly	Gimnástico	2–2 (5–4 p)	Motagua	Tegucigalpa, Francisco Morazán
19:00 (UTC−06:00)				Stadium: Estadio Emilio Larach

=== Apertura ===
16 September 2015 Week 1	Juticalpa	1–2	Motagua	Juticalpa
16:00	Caetano 19' (pen.)	Report	16' Crisanto; 90+4' Gómez	Stadium: Estadio Juan Ramón Brevé Vargas; Attendance: 4,850; Referee: Saíd Martínez Starting XI: 1 – Portigliatti; 2 – Montes; 3 – Figueroa; 6 – Mayorquín; 10 – Silva (substituted off) 51'; 11 – Gómez; 14 – Reyna (substituted off) 70'; 18 – W. Crisanto; 19 – Oseguera; 22 – Vergara (substituted off) 65'; 27 – F. Crisanto; Substitutes; 7 – Andino (substituted on) 51'; 24 – Elvir (substituted on) 65'; 16 – Castellanos (substituted on) 70'

9 August 2015 Week 2	Motagua	5–1	Victoria	Tegucigalpa
16:00	Gómez 18'; Silva 32' 59'; Pereira 80'; Mayorquín 86'	Report	27' Vuelto	Stadium: Estadio Tiburcio Carías Andino; Attendance: 2,300; Referee: Saíd Martínez Starting XI: 1 – Portigliatti; 2 – Montes; 4 – Izaguirre; 5 – Pereira; 6 – Mayorquín; 8 – Peralta (substituted off) 40'; 10 – Silva (substituted off) 71'; 11 – Gómez; 18 – W. Crisanto (substituted off) 74'; 19 – Oseguera; 22 – Vergara; Substitutes; 16 – Castellanos (substituted on) 40'; 34 – López (substituted on) 71'; 27 – F. Crisanto (substituted on) 74'

12 August 2015 Week 3	Olimpia	1–2	Motagua	Tegucigalpa
19:00	Palacios 82'	Report	25' 90+2' Gómez	Stadium: Estadio Tiburcio Carías Andino; Attendance: 4,883; Referee: Héctor Rodríguez Starting XI: 1 – Portigliatti; 2 – Montes; 4 – Izaguirre; 6 – Mayorquín; 10 – Silva (substituted off) 67'; 11 – Gómez; 16 – Castellanos; 18 – W. Crisanto; 19 – Oseguera; 22 – Vergara (substituted off) 65'; 27 – F. Crisanto; Substitutes; 34 – López (substituted on) 65'; 9 – Castillo (substituted on) 67'

15 August 2015 Week 4	Marathón	2–1	Motagua	San Pedro Sula
19:00	Berríos 54' (pen.); Puerto 63'	Report	68' López	Stadium: Estadio General Francisco Morazán; Attendance: 2,162; Referee: Raúl Castro Starting XI: 1 – Portigliatti; 2 – Montes; 4 – Izaguirre; 6 – Mayorquín (substituted off) 56'; 10 – Silva (substituted off) 56'; 11 – Gómez; 16 – Castellanos; 18 – W. Crisanto; 22 – Vergara (substituted off) 65'; 24 – Elvir; 27 – F. Crisanto; Substitutes; 7 – Andino (substituted on) 56'; 9 – Castillo (substituted on) 56'; 34 – López (substituted on) 65'

23 August 2015 Week 5	Motagua	2–1	Platense	Tegucigalpa
16:00	Gómez 6'; Castillo 31'	Report	29' (o.g.) Montes	Stadium: Estadio Tiburcio Carías Andino; Attendance: 2,581; Referee: Ángel Cruz Starting XI: 1 – Portigliatti; 2 – Montes; 4 – Izaguirre; 5 – Pereira; 6 – Mayorquín (substituted off) 65'; 9 – Castillo; 11 – Gómez (substituted off) 74'; 14 – Reyna; 18 – Crisanto; 19 – Oseguera; 22 – Vergara (substituted off) 46'; Substitutes; 24 – Elvir (substituted on) 46'; 16 – Castellanos (substituted on) 65'; 7 – Andino (substituted on) 74'

30 August 2015 Week 6	Honduras Progreso	4–1	Motagua	El Progreso
15:30	Acevedo 7'; Tejeda 13'; León 18'; Pereira 40' (o.g.)	Report	79' Andino	Stadium: Estadio Humberto Micheletti; Attendance: 3,838; Referee: Héctor Rodríguez Starting XI: 1 – Portigliatti; 3 – Figueroa; 4 – Izaguirre; 5 – Pereira (substituted off) 46'; 6 – Mayorquín (substituted off) 27'; 7 – Andino; 11 – Gómez; 16 – Castellanos; 18 – W. Crisanto; 19 – Oseguera; 22 – Vergara (substituted off) 46'; Substitutes; 8 – Peralta (substituted on) 27'; 30 – Hernández (substituted on) 46'; 27 – F. Crisanto (substituted on) 46'

6 September 2015 Week 7	Motagua	2–4	Real Sociedad	Tegucigalpa
16:00	Gómez (penalty missed) 45' 68'	Report	42' (pen.) González; 54' Abbott; 83' Melgares; 90+5' Vega	Stadium: Estadio Tiburcio Carías Andino; Attendance: 2,094; Referee: Nelson Salgado

12 September 2015 Week 8	Motagua	5–0	Vida	Tegucigalpa
19:00	Hernández 10'; Crisanto 45'; Gómez 60'; Vergara 69'; Elvir 81'	Report		Stadium: Estadio Tiburcio Carías Andino; Attendance: 2,795; Referee: Armando Castro

19 September 2015 Week 9	Real España	2–2	Motagua	San Pedro Sula
19:00	Cardozo 9' 82' (pen.)	Report	45+2' Montes; 77' (pen.) Andino	Stadium: Estadio General Francisco Morazán; Attendance: 1,372; Referee: Melvin Matamoros

29 September 2015 Week 10	Motagua	2–2	Juticalpa	Tegucigalpa
19:00	Montes 42'; Andino 85' (pen.)	Report	14' Lanza; 39' Peña	Stadium: Estadio Tiburcio Carías Andino; Attendance: 2,144; Referee: Gerson Almendárez

3 October 2015 Week 11	Victoria	2–2	Motagua	La Ceiba
19:00	Ortiz (penalty missed) 55' 74'	Report	46' Vergara; 87' Hernández	Stadium: Estadio Nilmo Edwards; Attendance: 1,811; Referee: Raúl Castro

11 November 2015 Week 12	Motagua	1–0	Olimpia	Tegucigalpa
19:00	Vergara 39'	Report		Stadium: Estadio Tiburcio Carías Andino; Attendance: 3,757; Referee: Héctor Rodríguez

15 October 2015 Week 13	Motagua	2–0	Marathón	Tegucigalpa
19:00	Silva 12' 40'	Report		Stadium: Estadio Tiburcio Carías Andino; Attendance: 1,156; Referee: Armando Castro

25 October 2015 Week 14	Platense	1–1	Motagua	Puerto Cortés
15:00	Rodríguez 79'	Report	67' Hernández	Stadium: Estadio Excélsior; Attendance: 1,878; Referee: Nelson Salgado

28 October 2015 Week 15	Motagua	3–0	Honduras Progreso	Tegucigalpa
19:00	Andino 14' 67'; Mayorquín 65'	Report		Stadium: Estadio Tiburcio Carías Andino; Attendance: 2,082; Referee: Melvin Matamoros

1 November 2015 Week 16	Real Sociedad	3–1	Motagua	Tocoa
14:00	Vega 8' 27'; Salgado 74'	Report	64' Andino	Stadium: Estadio Francisco Martínez Durón; Attendance: 1,602; Referee: Erick Andino

7 November 2015 Week 17	Vida	0–0	Motagua	La Ceiba
19:00		Report		Stadium: Estadio Nilmo Edwards; Attendance: 3,845; Referee: Miguel Torres

14 November 2015 Week 18	Motagua	7–1	Real España	Tegucigalpa
15:00	Hernández 1' 5' 47'; Silva 42'; López 64' 70'; Grant 88'	Report	38' Mejía	Stadium: Estadio Tiburcio Carías Andino; Attendance: 1,605; Referee: Armando Castro

29 November 2015 Semifinals	Olimpia	1–1	Motagua	Tegucigalpa
18:00	Méndez 22'	Report	35' Hernández	Stadium: Estadio Tiburcio Carías Andino; Attendance: 12,087; Referee: Geovanny Mendoza

5 December 2015 Semifinals	Motagua	1–1	Olimpia	Tegucigalpa
19:00	López 84'	Report	21' Quioto	Stadium: Estadio Tiburcio Carías Andino; Attendance: 15,058; Referee: Armando Castro

12 December 2015 Final	Motagua	3–3	Honduras Progreso	Tegucigalpa
19:30	Hernández 8' 27'; Silva 45'	Report	4' 54' Elvir; 38' Morales	Stadium: Estadio Tiburcio Carías Andino; Attendance: 16,528; Referee: Said Martínez

19 December 2015 Final	Honduras Progreso	1–1 (4–1 p)	Motagua	El Progreso
19:15	Figueroa 32' (o.g.)	Report	6' López	Stadium: Estadio Humberto Micheletti; Attendance: 6,000; Referee: Armando Castro
	Penalties
	Arriola (penalty scored); Alvarado (penalty scored); Sánchez (penalty scored); Acevedo (penalty scored)		(penalty missed) Andino; (penalty missed) Vergara; (penalty scored) Crisanto

=== Clausura ===
10 January 2016 Round 1	Platense	0–2	Motagua	Puerto Cortés, Cortés
15:00 (UTC−06:00)		Report	39' Vergara; 67' Mayorquín	Stadium: Estadio Excélsior; Attendance: 2,642; Referee: Miguel Torres Starting XI: 1 – Portigliatti; 2 – Montes; 3 – Figueroa; 6 – Mayorquín (substituted off) 81'; 7 – Andino; 10 – Silva (substituted off) 64'; 14 – Reyna (substituted off) 77'; 18 – Crisanto; 22 – Vergara; 24 – Elvir; 34 – López; Substitutes; 11 – Gómez (substituted on) 64'; 16 – Castellanos (substituted on) 77'; 8 – Peralta (substituted on) 81'

16 January 2016 Round 2	Motagua	4–0	Victoria	Tegucigalpa, Francisco Morazán
19:00 (UTC−06:00)	Montes 18'; Vergara 32'; Hernández 39' (pen.); Andino 90+1'	Report		Stadium: Estadio Tiburcio Carías Andino; Attendance: 1,812; Referee: Héctor Rodríguez Starting XI: 1 – Portigliatti; 2 – Montes; 3 – Figueroa; 6 – Mayorquín; 10 – Silva (substituted off) 76'; 14 – Reyna; 18 – Crisanto; 22 – Vergara (substituted off) 60'; 24 – Elvir; 30 – Hernández (substituted off) 56'; 34 – López; Substitutes; 11 – Gómez (substituted on) 56'; 7 – Andino (substituted on) 60'; 8 – Peralta (substituted on) 76'

24 January 2016 Round 3	Olimpia	1–0	Motagua	Tegucigalpa, Francisco Morazán
16:00 (UTC−06:00)	Alvarado 86' (pen.)	Report		Stadium: Estadio Tiburcio Carías Andino; Attendance: 12,683; Referee: Geovanny Mendoza Starting XI: 1 – Portigliatti; 2 – Montes; 3 – Figueroa; 6 – Mayorquín; 10 – Silva (substituted off) 62'; 14 – Reyna; 18 – Crisanto; 22 – Vergara (substituted off) 76'; 24 – Elvir; 30 – Hernández; 34 – López; Substitutes; 11 – Gómez (substituted on) 62'; 7 – Andino (substituted on) 76'

30 January 2016 Round 4	Real España	1–0	Motagua	San Pedro Sula, Cortés
19:00 (UTC−06:00)	Arévalo 64'	Report		Stadium: Estadio Francisco Morazán; Attendance: 5,440; Referee: Óscar Moncada Starting XI: 1 – Portigliatti; 2 – Montes; 3 – Figueroa; 6 – Mayorquín (substituted off) 81'; 10 – Silva (substituted off) 63'; 14 – Reyna; 18 – Crisanto; 22 – Vergara; 24 – Elvir; 30 – Hernández; 34 – López (substituted off) 71'; Substitutes; 7 – Andino (substituted on) 63'; 11 – Gómez (substituted on) 71'; 8 – Peralta (substituted on) 81'

6 February 2016 Round 5	Motagua	3–3	Real Sociedad	Tegucigalpa, Francisco Morazán
19:00 (UTC−06:00)	Elvir 18'; Crisanto 38' (pen.); Hernández 90+1'	Report	6' Altamirano; 25' Palacios; 45+1' Vega	Stadium: Estadio Tiburcio Carías Andino; Attendance: 1,865; Referee: Miguel Torres Starting XI: 1 – Portigliatti; 2 – Montes; 3 – Figueroa; 6 – Mayorquín (substituted off) 79'; 8 – Peralta; 11 – Gómez (substituted off) 88'; 14 – Reyna; 18 – Crisanto; 22 – Vergara; 24 – Elvir; 30 – Hernández; Substitutes; 34 – López (substituted on) 79'; 7 – Andino (substituted on) 88'

12 February 2016 Round 6	Honduras Progreso	1–2	Motagua	El Progreso, Yoro
19:15 (UTC−06:00)	Elvir 61' (pen.)	Report	21' Silva; 66' Gómez	Stadium: Estadio Humberto Micheletti; Attendance: 1,015; Referee: Said Martínez Starting XI: 1 – Portigliatti; 2 – Montes; 4 – Izaguirre; 6 – Mayorquín; 10 – Silva (substituted off) 82'; 11 – Gómez; 14 – Reyna (substituted off) 87'; 18 – Crisanto; 22 – Vergara (substituted off) 90+4'; 24 – Elvir; 34 – López; Substitutes; 21 – Grant (substituted on) 82'; 16 – Castellanos (substituted on) 87'; 23 – Martínez (substituted on) 90+4'

20 February 2016 Round 7	Motagua	2–0	Juticalpa	Tegucigalpa, Francisco Morazán
19:00 (UTC−06:00)	Gómez 12' 32'	Report		Stadium: Estadio Tiburcio Carías Andino; Attendance: 2,202; Referee: Geovanny Mendoza Starting XI: 1 – Portigliatti; 2 – Montes; 3 – Figueroa; 4 – Izaguirre; 6 – Mayorquín; 11 – Gómez; 14 – Reyna (substituted off) 88'; 18 – Crisanto (substituted off) 77'; 21 – Grant (substituted off) 85'; 22 – Vergara; 24 – Elvir; Substitutes; 34 – López (substituted on) 77'; 10 – Silva (substituted on) 85'; 16 – Castellanos (substituted on) 88'

27 February 2016 Round 8	Motagua	1–1	Vida	Tegucigalpa, Francisco Morazán
19:00 (UTC−06:00)	Vergara 8'	Report	65' Canales	Stadium: Estadio Tiburcio Carías Andino; Attendance: 1,961; Referee: Héctor Rodríguez Starting XI: 1 – Portigliatti; 2 – Montes; 3 – Figueroa; 4 – Izaguirre; 6 – Mayorquín (substituted off) 81'; 10 – Silva (substituted off) 46'; 11 – Gómez; 14 – Reyna (substituted off); 18 – Crisanto; 22 – Vergara; 24 – Elvir; Substitutes; 10 – Silva (substituted on) 46'; 16 – Castellanos (substituted on) 81'; 23 – Martínez (substituted on)

5 March 2016 Round 9	Marathón	3–1	Motagua	San Pedro Sula, Cortés
15:00 (UTC−06:00)	Argueta 5'; Martínez 45'; Reyes 70'	Report	86' (pen.) Gómez	Stadium: Estadio Yankel Rosenthal; Attendance: 2,272; Referee: Óscar Moncada Starting XI: 1 – Portigliatti; 2 – Montes; 4 – Izaguirre; 11 – Gómez; 14 – Reyna; 16 – Castellanos; 18 – W. Crisanto (substituted off) 46'; 21 – Grant (substituted off) 46'; 22 – Vergara; 24 – Elvir; 34 – López (substituted off) 59'; Substitutes; 27 – F. Crisanto (substituted on) 46'; 10 – Silva (substituted on) 46'; 7 – Andino (substituted on) 59'

12 March 2016 Round 10	Motagua	2–0	Platense	Tegucigalpa, Francisco Morazán
19:00 (UTC−06:00)	Crisanto 34' (pen.); Vergara 71'	Report		Stadium: Estadio Tiburcio Carías Andino; Attendance: 1,966; Referee: Óscar Moncada Starting XI: 1 – Portigliatti; 2 – Montes; 4 – Izaguirre; 7 – Andino; 8 – Peralta (substituted off) 64'; 10 – Silva (substituted off) 85'; 14 – Reyna; 18 – W. Crisanto (substituted off) 80'; 22 – Vergara; 24 – Elvir; 27 – F. Crisanto; Substitutes; 16 – Castellanos (substituted on) 64'; 5 – Pereira (substituted on) 80'; 21 – Grant (substituted on) 85'

19 March 2016 Round 11	Victoria	0–2	Motagua	La Ceiba, Atlántida
19:00 (UTC−06:00)		Report	6' Silva; 85' Andino	Stadium: Estadio Nilmo Edwards; Attendance: 1,742; Referee: Geovanny Mendoza Starting XI: 1 – Portigliatti; 2 – Montes; 4 – Izaguirre; 7 – Andino; 8 – Peralta (substituted off) 50'; 10 – Silva (substituted off) 86'; 14 – Reyna; 18 – W. Crisanto; 22 – Vergara (substituted off) 67'; 24 – Elvir; 27 – F. Crisanto; Substitutes; 16 – Castellanos (substituted on) 50'; 23 – Martínez (substituted on) 67'; 28 – Nieto (substituted on) 86'

2 April 2016 Round 12	Motagua	1–4	Olimpia	Tegucigalpa, Francisco Morazán
19:00 (UTC−06:00)	Reyna 23'	Report	28' 71' Costly; 39' Quioto; 60' (pen.) Elis	Stadium: Estadio Tiburcio Carías Andino; Attendance: 8,128; Referee: Armando Castro Starting XI: 1 – Portigliatti; 2 – Montes; 4 – Izaguirre; 7 – Andino; 8 – Peralta (substituted off) 73'; 10 – Silva (substituted off) 63'; 14 – Reyna (substituted off) 79'; 18 – W. Crisanto; 22 – Vergara; 24 – Elvir; 27 – F. Crisanto; Substitutes; 23 – Martínez (substituted on) 63'; 16 – Castellanos (substituted on) 73'; 26 – Güity (substituted on) 79'

6 April 2016 Round 13	Motagua	0–0	Real España	Tegucigalpa, Francisco Morazán
19:00 (UTC−06:00)		Report		Stadium: Estadio Tiburcio Carías Andino; Attendance: 1,765; Referee: Melvin Matamoros Starting XI: 1 – Portigliatti; 2 – Montes; 3 – Figueroa; 7 – Andino; 10 – Silva (substituted off) 77'; 14 – Reyna (substituted off) 85'; 16 – Castellanos; 18 – W. Crisanto (substituted off) 82'; 22 – Vergara; 24 – Elvir; 27 – F. Crisanto; Substitutes; 21 – Grant (substituted on) 77'; 26 – Güity (substituted on) 82'; 23 – Martínez (substituted on) 85'

10 April 2016 Round 14	Real Sociedad	2–0	Motagua	Tocoa, Colón
14:00 (UTC−06:00)	Vega 63'; Martínez 80'	Report		Stadium: Estadio Francisco Martínez Durón; Attendance: 1,851; Referee: Miguel Torres Starting XI: 1 – Portigliatti; 2 – Montes; 4 – Izaguirre; 5 – Pereira; 8 – Peralta (substituted off) 68'; 14 – Reyna; 16 – Castellanos; 21 – Grant; 22 – Vergara (substituted off) 65'; 24 – Elvir; 27 – Crisanto; Substitutes; 28 – Nieto (substituted on) 65'; 10 – Silva (substituted on) 68'

16 April 2016 Round 15	Motagua	2–1	Honduras Progreso	Tegucigalpa, Francisco Morazán
19:00 (UTC−06:00)	Silva 24' 70'	Report	89' (pen.) Elvir	Stadium: Estadio Tiburcio Carías Andino; Attendance: 1,652; Referee: Geovanny Mendoza Starting XI: 1 – Portigliatti; 2 – Montes; 3 – Figueroa; 4 – Izaguirre; 7 – Andino (substituted off) 83'; 10 – Silva; 11 – Gómez (substituted off) 53'; 14 – Reyna; 16 – Castellanos; 24 – Elvir; 27 – F. Crisanto (substituted off) 68'; Substitutes; 21 – Grant (substituted on) 53'; 18 – W. Crisanto (substituted on) 68'; 26 – Güity (substituted on) 83'

24 April 2016 Round 16	Juticalpa	4–2	Motagua	Juticalpa, Olancho
14:00 (UTC−06:00)	Flores 34' (pen.) 69' (pen.); Mejía 56'; Cruz 74'	Report	9' 82' Silva; (penalty missed) Gómez	Stadium: Estadio Juan Ramón Brevé Vargas; Attendance: 5,101; Referee: Raúl Castro Starting XI: 1 – Portigliatti; 2 – Montes; 3 – Figueroa; 4 – Izaguirre; 7 – Andino; 8 – Peralta (substituted off) 46'; 10 – Silva; 11 – Gómez; 22 – Vergara; 24 – Elvir; 27 – F. Crisanto (substituted off) 79'; Substitutes; 18 – W. Crisanto (substituted on) 46'; 6 – Mayorquín (substituted on) 79'

27 April 2016 Round 17	Vida	0–2	Motagua	La Ceiba, Atlántida
19:00 (UTC−06:00)		Report	33' Silva; 90+2' Andino	Stadium: Estadio Nilmo Edwards; Attendance: 1,672; Referee: Óscar Moncada Starting XI: 25 – Licona; 2 – Montes; 3 – Figueroa; 4 – Izaguirre (substituted off) 62'; 8 – Peralta; 10 – Silva (substituted off) 70'; 11 – Gómez (substituted off) 61'; 16 – Castellanos; 18 – W. Crisanto; 22 – Vergara; 27 – F. Crisanto; Substitutes; 28 – Nieto (substituted on) 61'; 5 – Pereira (substituted on) 62'; 7 – Andino (substituted on) 70'

1 May 2016 Round 18	Motagua	2–1	Marathón	Tegucigalpa, Francisco Morazán
15:00 (UTC−06:00)	Silva 12' 44'	Report	37' Moreira	Stadium: Estadio Tiburcio Carías Andino; Attendance: 2,497; Referee: Héctor Rodríguez Starting XI: 25 – Licona; 2 – Montes; 3 – Figueroa; 5 – Pereira; 10 – Silva (substituted off) 85'; 16 – Castellanos; 18 – W. Crisanto; 22 – Vergara; 27 – F. Crisanto; 29 – K. Andino (substituted off) 88'; 31 – Bernárdez; Substitutes; 7 – E. Andino (substituted on) 85'; 28 – Nieto (substituted on) 88'

5 May 2016 Playoff	Juticalpa	1–0	Motagua	Juticalpa, Olancho
18:00 (UTC−06:00)	Ramírez 9'	Report		Stadium: Estadio Juan Ramón Brevé Vargas; Attendance: 4,300; Referee: Armando Castro Starting XI: 25 – Licona; 2 – Montes; 3 – Figueroa; 5 – Pereira; 8 – Peralta (substituted off) 46'; 10 – Silva; 11 – Gómez (substituted off) 68'; 16 – Castellanos; 18 – W. Crisanto; 22 – Vergara (substituted off) 75'; 27 – F. Crisanto; Substitutes; 14 – Reyna (substituted on) 46'; 7 – Andino (substituted on) 68'; 24 – Elvir (substituted on) 75'

8 May 2016 Playoff	Motagua	3–0	Juticalpa	Tegucigalpa, Francisco Morazán
16:00 (UTC−06:00)	Vergara 10'; Gómez 17'; Andino 82'	Report		Stadium: Estadio Tiburcio Carías Andino; Attendance: 5,187; Referee: Geovanny Mendoza Starting XI: 1 – Portigliatti; 2 – Montes; 3 – Figueroa; 4 – Izaguirre; 6 – Mayorquín (substituted off) 67'; 10 – Silva; 11 – Gómez; 14 – Reyna; 18 – W. Crisanto; 22 – Vergara; 24 – Elvir (substituted off) 70'; Substitutes; 16 – Castellanos (substituted on) 67'; 27 – F. Crisanto (substituted on) 70'; 7 – Andino (substituted on)

12 May 2016 Semifinal	Motagua	0–0	Olimpia	Tegucigalpa, Francisco Morazán
19:00 (UTC−06:00)		Report		Stadium: Estadio Tiburcio Carías Andino; Attendance: 6,947; Referee: Héctor Rodríguez Starting XI: 1 – Portigliatti; 2 – Montes; 3 – Figueroa (substituted off) 40'; 4 – Izaguirre; 6 – Mayorquín (substituted off) 83'; 10 – Silva (substituted off) 66'; 11 – Gómez; 14 – Reyna; 18 – W. Crisanto; 22 – Vergara; 27 – F. Crisanto; Substitutes; 5 – Pereira (substituted on) 40'; 7 – Andino (substituted on) 66'; 24 – Elvir (substituted on) 83'

15 May 2016 Semifinal	Olimpia	2–0	Motagua	Tegucigalpa, Francisco Morazán
16:00 (UTC−06:00)	Costly 34'; Quioto 43'	Report		Stadium: Estadio Tiburcio Carías Andino; Attendance: 14,516; Referee: Óscar Moncada Starting XI: 1 – Portigliatti; 2 – Montes; 4 – Izaguirre (substituted off) 46'; 5 – Pereira; 6 – Mayorquín; 10 – Silva; 11 – Gómez (substituted off) 71'; 14 – Reyna (substituted off) 46'; 18 – W. Crisanto; 22 – Vergara; 27 – F. Crisanto; Substitutes; 7 – Andino (substituted on) 46'; 24 – Elvir (substituted on) 46'; 21 – Grant (substituted on) 71'

=== Honduran Cup ===
7 October 2015 Round of 64	San Juan Bosco	1–2	Motagua	Choluteca, Choluteca
15:00 (UTC−06:00)	Pérez 36'		44' Hernández; 46' Gómez; (red card) 74' Peralta	Stadium: Estadio Fausto Flores Lagos; Referee: Saíd Martínez Starting XI: 25 – Licona; 2 – Montes; 4 – Izaguirre; 6 – Mayorquín; 8 – Peralta; 11 – Gómez; 16 – Castellanos; 22 – Vergara; 24 – Elvir; 27 – Crisanto; 30 – Hernández

4 November 2015 Round of 32	Independiente	0–1	Motagua	Cantarranas, Francisco Morazán
15:00 (UTC−06:00)			58' Silva	Stadium: Estadio Francisco Gaytán; Referee: José Zelaya Starting XI: 1 – Portigliatti; 5 – Pereira; 12 – Barrios; 15 – Núñez; 16 – Castellanos; 17 – Maldonado; 22 – Vergara; 28 – Nieto; 30 – Hernández; – Bernárdez; – Bernárdez

13 January 2016 Round of 16	Atlético Esperanzano	0–1	Motagua	La Esperanza, Intibucá
15:30 (UTC−06:00)			38' Hernández	Stadium: Estadio Romualdo Bueso; Referee: Saíd Martínez Starting XI: 25 – Licona; 2 – Montes; 4 – Izaguirre; 5 – Pereira; 11 – Gómez (substituted off) 62'; 16 – Castellanos; 22 – Vergara (substituted off) 70'; 28 – Nieto; 30 – Hernández (substituted off) 85'; 34 – López; – K. Bernárdez; Substitutes; 10 – Silva (substituted on) 62'; – M. Bernárdez (substituted on) 70'; 8 – Peralta (substituted on) 85'

17 February 2016 Quarterfinals	Juticalpa	0–0	Motagua	Juticalpa, Olancho
17:00 (UTC−06:00)				Stadium: Estadio Juan Ramón Brevé Vargas; Referee: Nelson Salgado Starting XI: 25 – Licona; 2 – Montes; 5 – Pereira; 7 – Andino (substituted off) 90'; 8 – Peralta (substituted off); 10 – Silva (substituted off) 45'; 15 – Núñez; 16 – Castellanos (red card); 21 – Grant; – Fiallos (substituted off) 31'; – Martínez (substituted off) 50'; Substitutes; 17 – Maldonado (substituted on) 31'; 11 – Gómez (substituted on) 45'; 22 – Vergara (substituted on) 50'; 27 – Crisanto (substituted on) 90'; 14 – Reyna (substituted on)

2 March 2016 Quarterfinals	Motagua	1–1	Juticalpa	Tegucigalpa, Francisco Morazán
19:00 (UTC−06:00)	Silva 68'		33' Mejía	Stadium: Estadio Tiburcio Carías Andino; Referee: Starting XI: 25 – Licona; 2 – Montes; 3 – Figueroa; 4 – Izaguirre; 5 – Pereira (substituted off) 46'; 7 – Andino (substituted off) 53'; 11 – Gómez; 14 – Reyna; 18 – W. Crisanto (substituted off) 64'; 22 – Vergara; 24 – Elvir; Substitutes; 10 – Silva (substituted on) 46'; – Martínez (substituted on) 53'; 27 – F. Crisanto (substituted on) 64'

=== Honduran Supercup ===
8 August 2015	Motagua	C	Olimpia	TBD
(UTC−06:00)

=== CONCACAF Champions League ===
Pos	Team	Pld	W	D	L	GF	GA	GD	Pts	Qualification	AMÉ	MOT	WAL
1	(Mexico) América	4	3	1	0	9	2	+7	10	Knockout stage	—	4–0	1–0
2	(Honduras) Motagua	4	2	1	1	5	6	−1	7		1–1	—	2–0
3	(Nicaragua) Walter Ferretti	4	0	0	4	2	8	−6	0		1–3	1–2	—

Source: CONCACAF

5 August 2015 Group E	América (Mexico)	4–0	(Honduras) Motagua	Mexico City, Mexico
22:00 (UTC−05:00)	Alvarado 2'; Aguilar 5'; Peralta 40'; Sambueza 55'	Report		Stadium: Estadio Azteca; Referee: Edvin Jurisevic (USA)

27 August 2015 Group E	Motagua (Honduras)	2–0	(Nicaragua) Walter Ferretti	Tegucigalpa, Honduras
20:00 (UTC−06:00)	Crisanto 68'; Hernández 75'	Report		Stadium: Estadio Tiburcio Carías Andino; Referee: William Anderson (PUR)

24 September 2015 Group E	Walter Ferretti (Nicaragua)	1–2	(Honduras) Motagua	Managua, Nicaragua
18:00 (UTC−06:00)	Leguías 75'	Report	43' (pen.) Andino; 90+3' Silva	Stadium: Nicaragua National Football Stadium; Referee: Chris Penso (USA)

20 October 2015 Group E	Motagua (Honduras)	1–1	(Mexico) América	Tegucigalpa, Honduras
20:00 (UTC−06:00)	Andino 16'	Report	88' Arroyo	Stadium: Estadio Tiburcio Carías Andino; Referee: Marlon Mejía (SLV)
