= Football at the 2012 Summer Olympics – Men's tournament – Group D =

Group D of the men's football tournament at the 2012 Summer Olympics took place from 26 July to 1 August 2012 in Coventry's City of Coventry Stadium, Glasgow's Hampden Park, Manchester's Old Trafford and Newcastle's St James' Park. The group contained Honduras, Japan, Morocco and Spain.

== Teams ==
Draw position	Team	Pot	Confederation	Method of qualification	Date of qualification	Olympic appearance	Last appearance	Previous best performance
D1	Spain	1	UEFA					
D2	Japan	3	AFC					
D3	Honduras	2	CONCACAF					
D4	Morocco	4	CAF					

== Standings ==
Pos	Team	Pld	W	D	L	GF	GA	GD	Pts	Qualification
1	Japan	3	2	1	0	2	0	+2	7	Advance to knockout stage
2	Honduras	3	1	2	0	3	2	+1	5	Advance to knockout stage
3	Morocco	3	0	2	1	2	3	−1	2	
4	Spain	3	0	1	2	0	2	−2	1	

Source: FIFA
Rules for classification: Group stage tiebreakers

== Matches ==
=== Honduras vs Morocco ===
26 July 2012
12:00

Honduras	2–2	Morocco
Bengtson 56', 65' (pen.)	Report	Barrada 39'; Labyad 67'

Hampden Park, Glasgow
Attendance: 23,421
Referee: Pavel Královec (Czech Republic)

Honduras	Morocco

GK	1	José Mendoza
DF	3	Maynor Figueroa
DF	5	José Velásquez	(yellow card) 32'
DF	16	Johnny Leverón (c)
MF	6	Arnold Peralta	(yellow card) 90+3'
MF	7	Mario Martínez		(substituted off) 88'
MF	8	Alfredo Mejía
MF	10	Alexander López		(substituted off) 57'
MF	14	Andy Najar
MF	15	Roger Espinoza	(yellow card) 87'
FW	11	Jerry Bengtson		(substituted off) 79'
Substitutions:
FW	13	Eddie Hernández		(substituted on) 57'
FW	9	Anthony Lozano		(substituted on) 79'
DF	8	Orlin Peralta		(substituted on) 88'
Manager:
(Colombia) Luis Suárez

GK	1	Mohamed Amsif
DF	3	Mohamed Abarhoun
DF	4	Abdelhamid El Kaoutari
DF	5	Zakarya Bergdich	(red card) 72'
DF	16	Yassine Jebbour
MF	8	Driss Fettouhi (c)
MF	10	Abdelaziz Barrada		(substituted off) 89'
MF	14	Houssine Kharja	(yellow card) 54'
FW	7	Zakaria Labyad
FW	9	Nordin Amrabat		(substituted off) 90'
FW	11	Soufiane Bidaoui	(yellow card) 51'	(substituted off) 75'
Substitutions:
DF	2	Abdelatif Noussir		(substituted on) 75'
MF	6	Imad Najah		(substituted on) 89'
MF	12	Omar El Kaddouri		(substituted on) 90'
Manager:
(Netherlands) Pim Verbeek

Assistant referees:
Martin Wilczek (Czech Republic)
Antonín Kordula (Czech Republic)
Fourth official:
Svein Oddvar Moen (Norway)

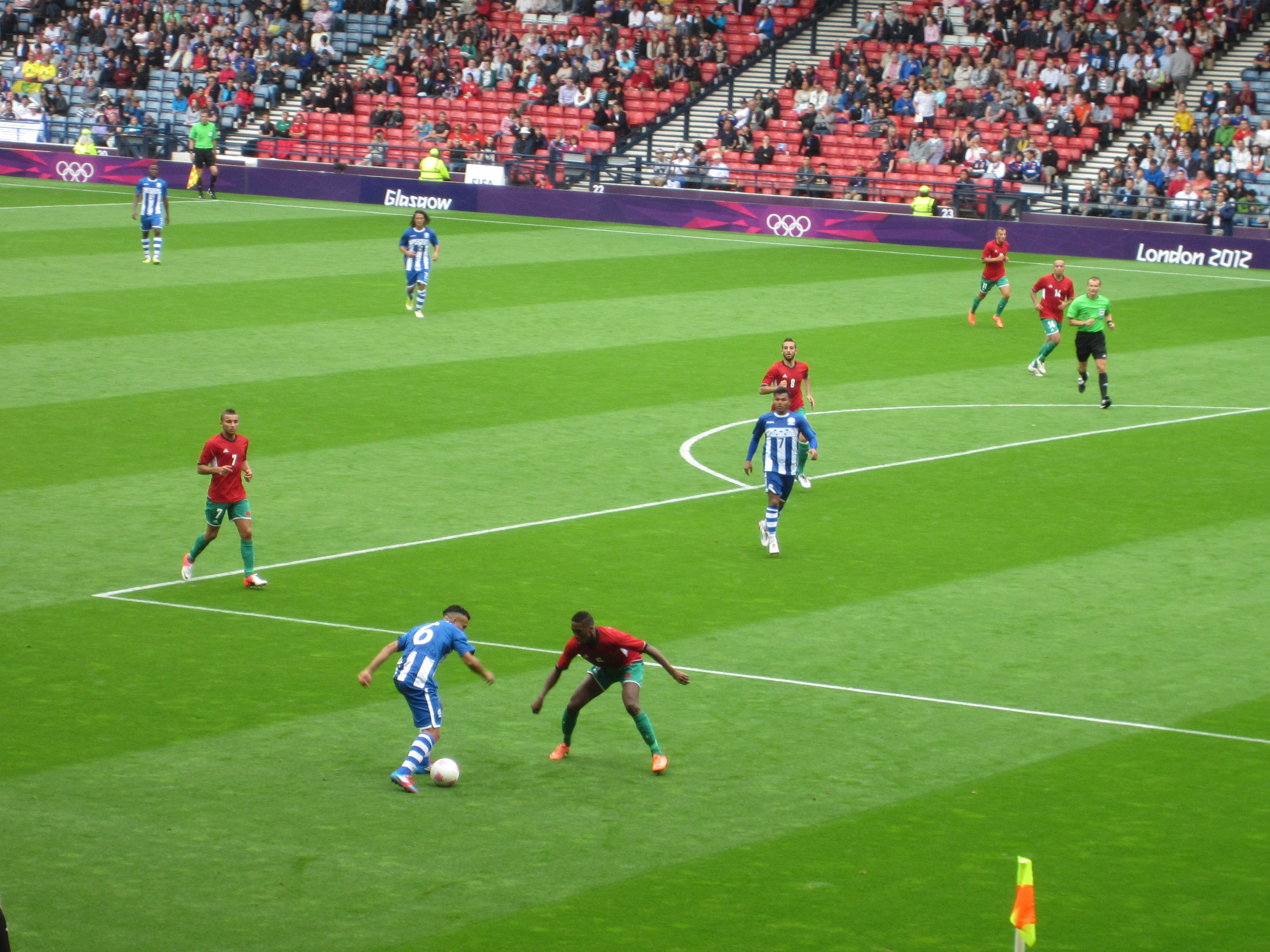

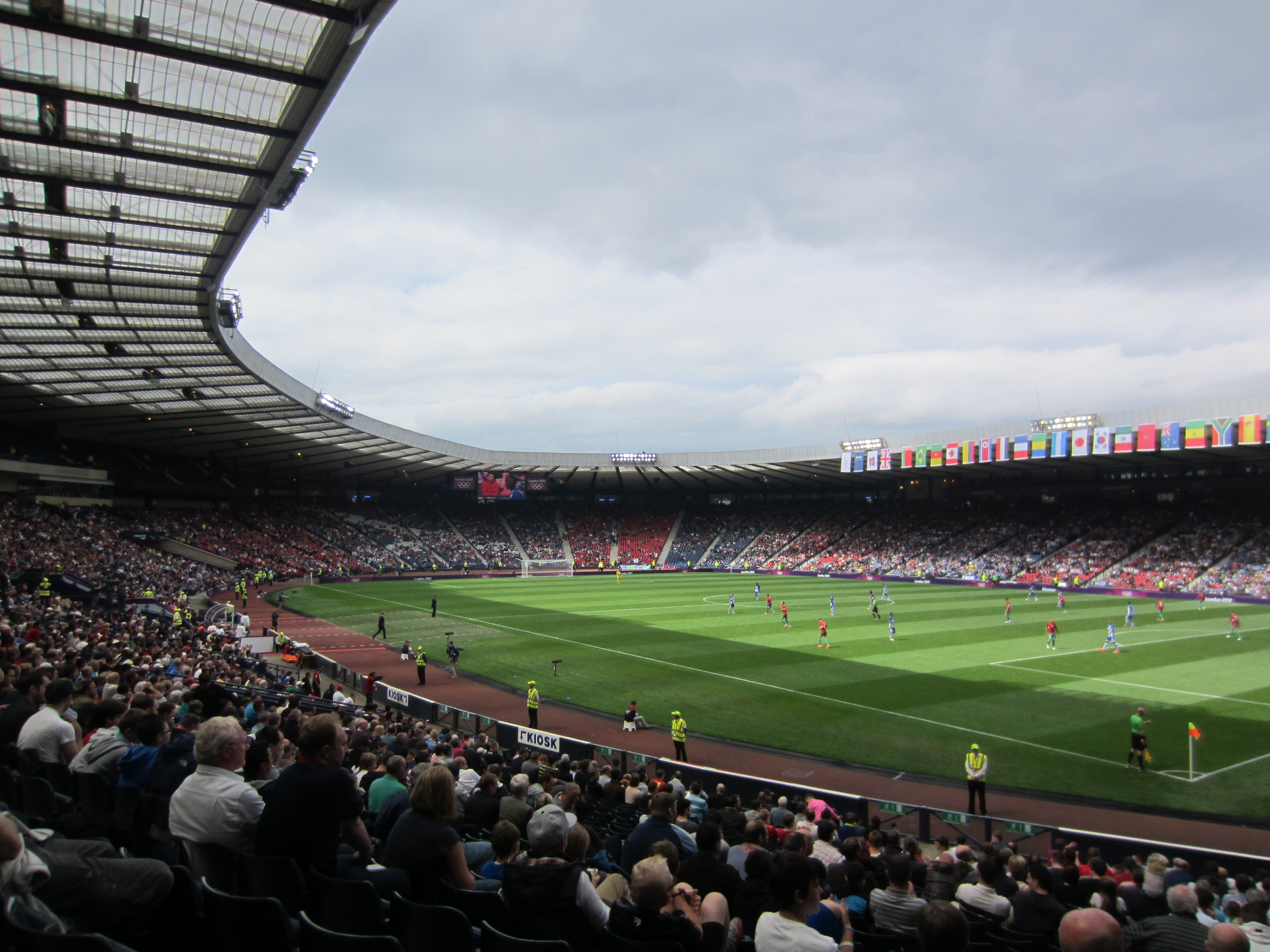

=== Spain vs Japan ===
26 July 2012
14:45

Spain	0–1	Japan
	Report	Ōtsu 34'

Hampden Park, Glasgow
Attendance: 37,726
Referee: Mark Geiger (United States)

Spain	Japan

GK	1	David de Gea
DF	3	Álvaro Domínguez	(yellow card) 89'
DF	5	Iñigo Martínez	(red card) 41'
DF	6	Jordi Alba	(yellow card) 40'
DF	12	Martín Montoya
MF	4	Javi Martínez (c)
MF	11	Koke		(substituted off) 81'
MF	15	Isco		(substituted off) 63'
FW	7	Adrián López		(substituted off) 56'
FW	9	Rodrigo
FW	10	Juan Mata
Substitutions:
MF	17	Ander Herrera		(substituted on) 56'
MF	14	Oriol Romeu		(substituted on) 63'
FW	16	Cristian Tello		(substituted on) 81'
Manager:
Luis Milla

GK	1	Shūichi Gonda
RB	4	Hiroki Sakai		(substituted off) 74'
CB	13	Daisuke Suzuki
CB	5	Maya Yoshida (c)
LB	2	Yūhei Tokunaga
CM	16	Hotaru Yamaguchi
CM	3	Takahiro Ogihara		(substituted off) 86'
RW	17	Hiroshi Kiyotake
AM	10	Keigo Higashi
LW	7	Yūki Ōtsu		(substituted off) 46'
CF	11	Kensuke Nagai
Substitutions:
FW	15	Manabu Saitō	(yellow card) 61'	(substituted on) 46'
DF	12	Gōtoku Sakai		(substituted on) 74'
DF	8	Kazuya Yamamura		(substituted on) 86'
Manager:
Takashi Sekizuka

Assistant referees:
Mark Hurd (United States)
Joe Fletcher (Canada)
Fourth official:
Roberto García (Mexico)

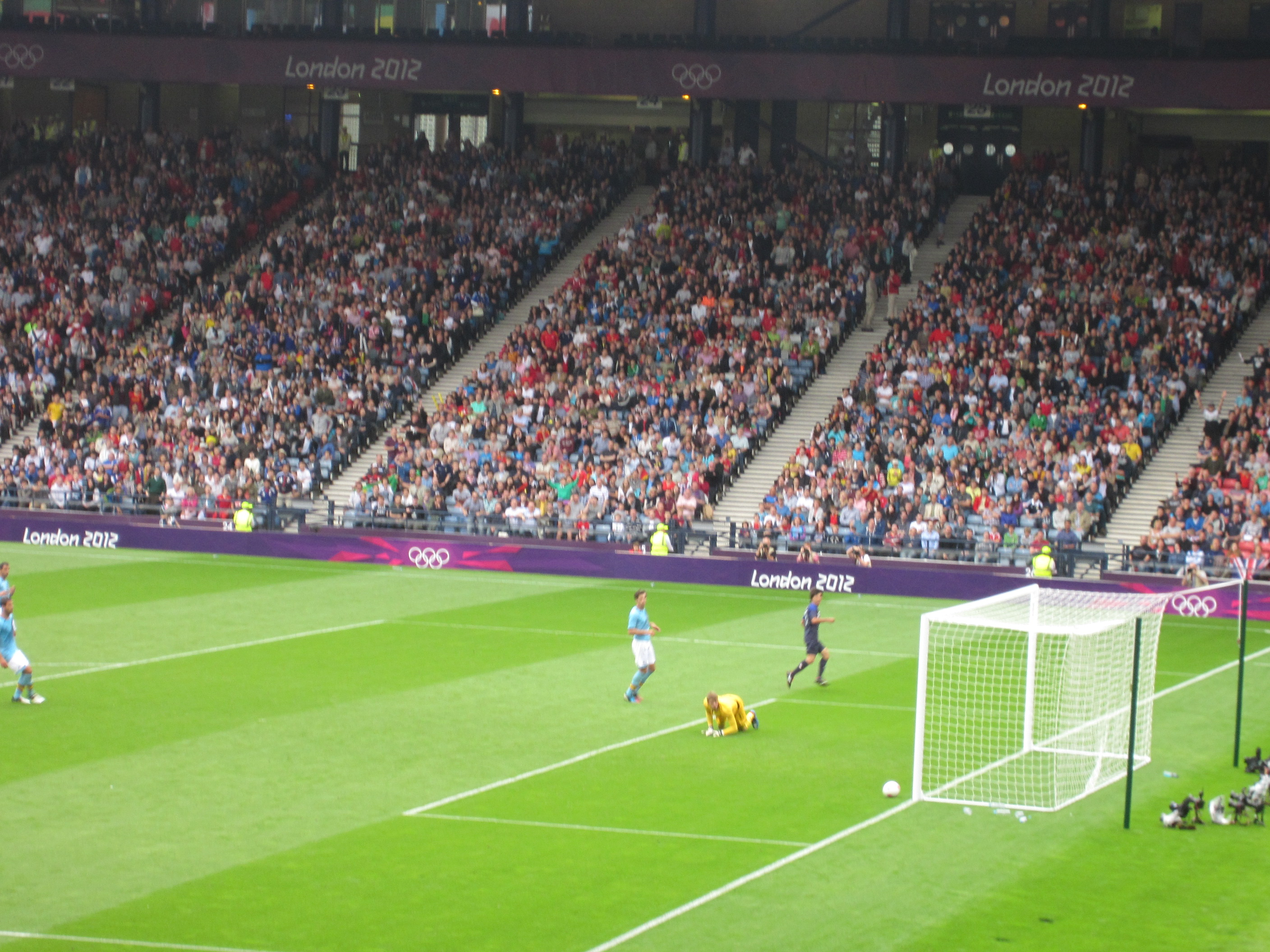

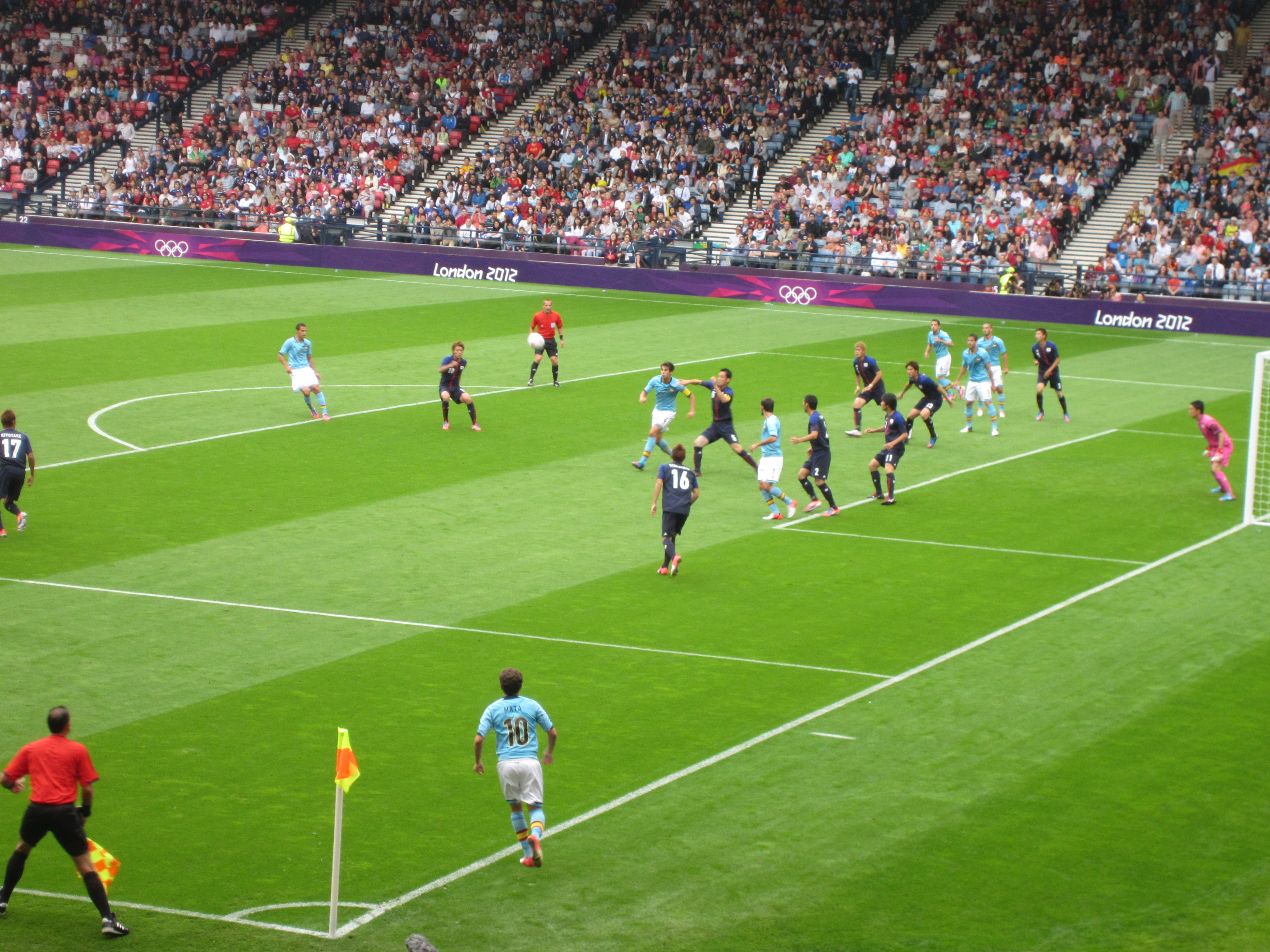

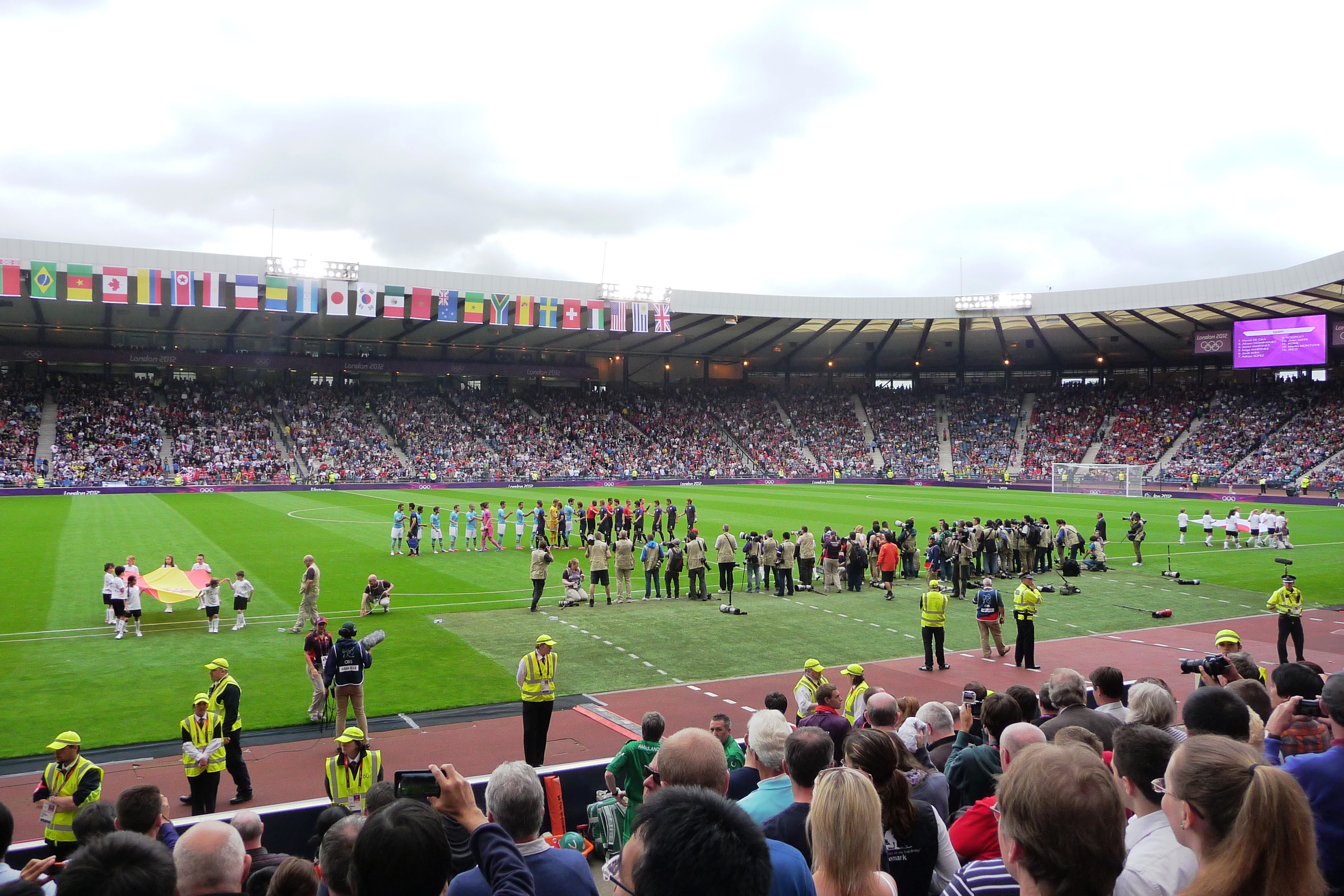

=== Japan vs Morocco ===
29 July 2012
17:00

Japan	1–0	Morocco
Nagai 84'	Report

St James' Park, Newcastle
Attendance: 24,936
Referee: Svein Oddvar Moen (Norway)

Japan	Morocco

GK	1	Shūichi Gonda
RB	12	Gōtoku Sakai
CB	13	Daisuke Suzuki
CB	5	Maya Yoshida (c)
LB	2	Yūhei Tokunaga
CM	16	Hotaru Yamaguchi
CM	3	Takahiro Ogihara
RW	17	Hiroshi Kiyotake	(substituted off) 90'
AM	10	Keigo Higashi
LW	7	Yūki Ōtsu	(substituted off) 78'
CF	11	Kensuke Nagai
Substitutions:
FW	15	Manabu Saitō	(substituted on) 78'
FW	9	Kenyu Sugimoto	(substituted on) 90'
Manager:
Takashi Sekizuka

GK	1	Mohamed Amsif
DF	2	Abdelatif Noussir	(yellow card) 90+1'
DF	4	Abdelhamid El Kaoutari
DF	5	Zakarya Bergdich
DF	16	Yassine Jebbour
MF	8	Driss Fettouhi (c)	(yellow card) 29'	(substituted off) 88'
MF	10	Abdelaziz Barrada
MF	14	Houssine Kharja
FW	7	Zakaria Labyad
FW	9	Nordin Amrabat		(substituted off) 72'
FW	11	Soufiane Bidaoui		(substituted off) 74'
Substitutions:
MF	6	Imad Najah		(substituted on) 72'
MF	12	Omar El Kaddouri		(substituted on) 74'
FW	17	Soufian El Hassnaoui		(substituted on) 88'
Manager:
(Netherlands) Pim Verbeek

Assistant referees:
Kim Haglund (Norway)
Frank Andas (Norway)
Fourth official:
Gianluca Rocchi (Italy)

=== Spain vs Honduras ===
29 July 2012
19:45

Spain	0–1	Honduras
	Report	Bengtson 7'

St James' Park, Newcastle
Attendance: 26,523
Referee: Juan Soto (Venezuela)

Spain	Honduras

GK	1	David de Gea
DF	3	Álvaro Domínguez
DF	6	Jordi Alba
DF	12	Martín Montoya	(yellow card) 39'
DF	13	Alberto Botía	(yellow card) 90'
MF	4	Javi Martínez (c)	(yellow card) 31'	(substituted off) 83'
MF	11	Koke		(substituted off) 46'
MF	15	Isco		(substituted off) 66'
FW	7	Adrián López
FW	8	Iker Muniain	(yellow card) 78'
FW	10	Juan Mata	(yellow card) 89'
Substitutions:
MF	17	Ander Herrera		(substituted on) 46'
MF	9	Rodrigo		(substituted on) 66'
FW	16	Cristian Tello	(yellow card) 45+4'	(substituted on) 83'
Other disciplinary actions:
GK	18	Diego Mariño	(yellow card) 45+4'
Manager:
Luis Milla

GK	1	José Mendoza	(yellow card) 45+2'
DF	2	Wilmer Crisanto
DF	3	Maynor Figueroa
DF	5	José Velásquez
DF	16	Johnny Leverón (c)	(yellow card) 78'
MF	6	Arnold Peralta	(yellow card) 24'
MF	7	Mario Martínez
MF	14	Andy Najar		(substituted off) 57'
MF	15	Roger Espinoza	(yellow card) 5'	(substituted off) 72'
MF	17	Luis Garrido	(yellow card) 59'
FW	11	Jerry Bengtson		(substituted off) 81'
Substitutions:
MF	8	Alfredo Mejía	(yellow card) 89'	(substituted on) 57'
MF	12	Orlin Peralta		(substituted on) 72'
MF	9	Anthony Lozano		(substituted on) 81'
Manager:
(Colombia) Luis Suárez

Assistant referees:
Jorge Urrego (Venezuela)
Carlos López (Venezuela)
Fourth official:
Wilmar Roldán (Colombia)

=== Japan vs Honduras ===
1 August 2012
17:00

Japan	0–0	Honduras
	Report

City of Coventry Stadium, Coventry
Attendance: 25,862
Referee: Slim Jedidi (Tunisia)

Japan	Honduras

GK	1	Shūichi Gonda
RB	6	Taisuke Muramatsu
CB	13	Daisuke Suzuki
CB	5	Maya Yoshida (c)
LB	12	Gōtoku Sakai
CM	16	Hotaru Yamaguchi
CM	8	Kazuya Yamamura
RW	14	Takashi Usami
AM	7	Yūki Ōtsu	(substituted off) 87'
LW	15	Manabu Saitō	(substituted off) 81'
CF	9	Kenyu Sugimoto	(substituted off) 67'
Substitutions:
MF	17	Hiroshi Kiyotake	(substituted on) 67'
FW	11	Kensuke Nagai	(substituted on) 81'
MF	10	Keigo Higashi	(substituted on) 87'
Manager:
Takashi Sekizuka

GK	1	José Mendoza
DF	2	Wilmer Crisanto	(yellow card) 80'
DF	3	Maynor Figueroa
DF	5	José Velásquez
DF	16	Johnny Leverón (c)
MF	7	Mario Martínez
MF	8	Alfredo Mejía
MF	14	Andy Najar	(yellow card) 51'	(substituted off) 60'
MF	17	Luis Garrido
FW	9	Anthony Lozano		(substituted off) 77'
FW	11	Jerry Bengtson
Substitutions:
MF	10	Alexander López		(substituted on) 60'
MF	12	Orlin Peralta		(substituted on) 77'
Manager:
(Colombia) Luis Suárez

Assistant referees:
Bechir Hassani (Tunisia)
Sherif Hassan (Egypt)
Fourth official:
Felix Brych (Germany)

=== Spain vs Morocco ===
1 August 2012
17:00

Spain	0–0	Morocco
	Report

Old Trafford, Manchester
Attendance: 35,973
Referee: Ben Williams (Australia)

Spain	Morocco

GK	1	David de Gea
DF	2	César Azpilicueta
DF	5	Iñigo Martínez	(yellow card) 35'
DF	6	Jordi Alba
DF	13	Alberto Botía
MF	4	Javi Martínez (c)		(substituted off) 46'
MF	14	Oriol Romeu
MF	15	Isco		(substituted off) 56'
FW	7	Adrián López
FW	8	Iker Muniain		(substituted off) 66'
FW	10	Juan Mata	(yellow card) 44'
Substitutions:
MF	17	Ander Herrera		(substituted on) 46'
FW	16	Cristian Tello		(substituted on) 56'
MF	11	Koke		(substituted on) 66'
Manager:
Luis Milla

GK	1	Mohamed Amsif
DF	2	Abdelatif Noussir
DF	3	Mohamed Abarhoun
DF	13	Zouhair Feddal	(yellow card) 39'
DF	16	Yassine Jebbour
MF	8	Driss Fettouhi (c)
MF	10	Abdelaziz Barrada
MF	14	Houssine Kharja
FW	7	Zakaria Labyad
FW	9	Nordin Amrabat
FW	11	Soufiane Bidaoui		(substituted off) 70'
Substitutions:
FW	17	Soufian El Hassnaoui		(substituted on) 70'
Manager:
(Netherlands) Pim Verbeek

Assistant referees:
Matthew Cream (Australia)
Hakan Anaz (Australia)
Fourth official:
Wilmar Roldán (Colombia)
