= Mohamed Abarhoun =

Moroccan footballer (1989–2020)

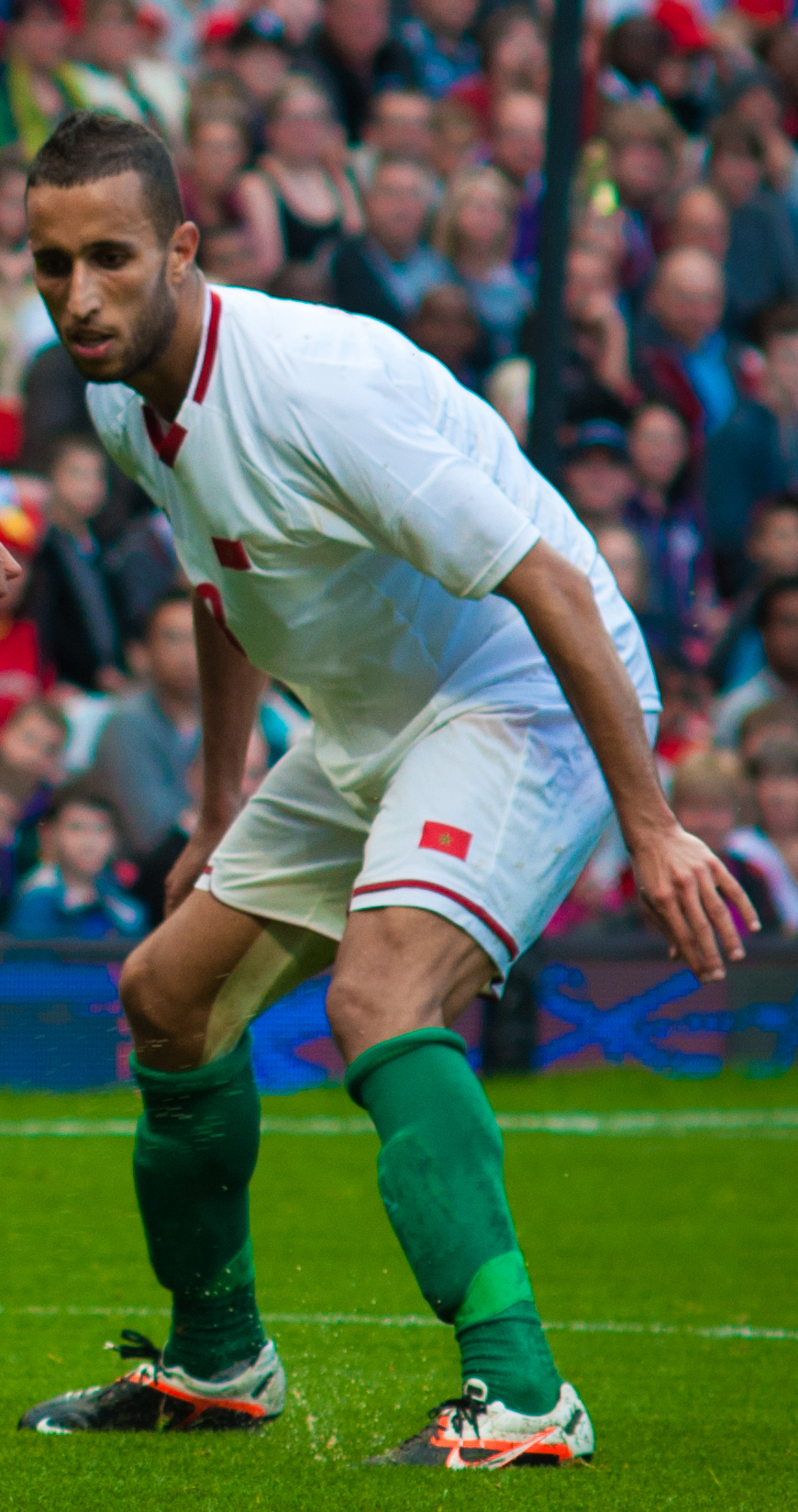
- Abarhoun playing for Morocco at the 2012 Summer Olympics

Personal information
- Full name: Mohamed Abarhoun
- Date of birth: 3 May 1989
- Place of birth: Tétouan, Morocco
- Date of death: 2 December 2020 (aged 31)
- Place of death: Turkey
- Height: 1.85 m (6 ft 1 in)
- Position: Defender

Senior career*
Years	Team	Apps	(Gls)
2010–2017	Moghreb Tétouan	164	(7)
2017–2019	Moreirense	37	(1)
2019–2020	Çaykur Rizespor	36	(3)
Total		237	(11)

International career
- Morocco U20
2012	Morocco U23	3	(0)
2013–2014	Morocco	7	(0)
- * Club domestic league appearances and goals

Mohamed Abarhoun (Arabic: محمد أبرهون, romanized: Muḥammad 'Ābarhūn; 3 May 1989 – 2 December 2020) was a Moroccan professional footballer who played as a defender. He played domestic football for hometown club Moghreb Tétouan, Portuguese club Moreirense, and Turkish club Çaykur Rizespor. Abarhoun also represented Morocco at under-20, under-23 and senior level. He died of stomach cancer at the age of 31.

== Club career ==
Abarhoun was born in Tétouan and played as a centre-back for local club Moghreb Tétouan between 2010 and 2017. He was hailed as part of the club's "golden generation" that won the Botola Pro 1 league in 2012 and 2014 and took part in the 2014 FIFA Club World Cup. He made 164 league appearances for the club and scored 7 goals.

Abarhoun joined Portuguese Primeira Liga club Moreirense in June 2017 after refusing to sign a new contract with Tétouan. Abarhoun was the eighth player brought to the club by new manager Manuel Machado. He scored his only goal for the club on 10 September in a 2–0 win at Estroil Praia, their first win of the season. Machado was sacked by the club in October following a run of poor results. He went on to make 23 league and 5 cup appearances for the club in his first season, in which the club finished fourth from bottom in the league. Abarhoun was the preferred starting centre-back for the club in the first part of the 2018–19 season, under new manager Ivo Vieira, and made 1 cup and 14 league appearances.

Abarhoun joined Turkish club Çaykur Rizespor in January 2019 on an 18-month initial contract. The transfer fee generated €200,000 for Moreirense. Rizespor manager Okan Buruk stated that Abarhoun was brought in to bolster the club's defence during their fight to avoid relegation from the Süper Lig. Abarhoun played in 16 league games for Rizespor that season and the club finished mid-table in 11th position. Abarhoun made 20 league for Rizespor in the 2019–20 season before illness ended his career. His last match was a 2–1 defeat at home to İstanbul Başakşehir on 24 February 2020. He also made one cup appearance, during a 2–1 loss away to Galatasaray in the second leg of the 8th round of the Turkish Cup on 23 January 2020.

== International career ==
Abarhoun played nine games for the Morocco under-20 team and eight for the under-23 team. This included three appearances at the 2012 Summer Olympics where the team drew two games and lost one to finish third in Group D. He made his senior international debut in 2013 and went on to earn seven international caps.

== Illness and death ==
In February 2020 Abarhoun reported feeling sick prior to a league match against Trabzonspor. He was taken to Istanbul's Acıbadem Hospital and was diagnosed with stomach cancer. In June 2020 a Rizespor spokesman claimed that Abarhoun was seriously ill and expected that he would not return to playing football. He was released by Rizespor at the end of the season, but continued to receive financial support from the club for his condition.

Abarhoun announced that he was recovering and feeling better in October 2020 and was hopeful of a return to football, but he died of the disease on 2 December 2020, at the age of 31.
