= Yassine Jebbour =

Footballer (born 1991)

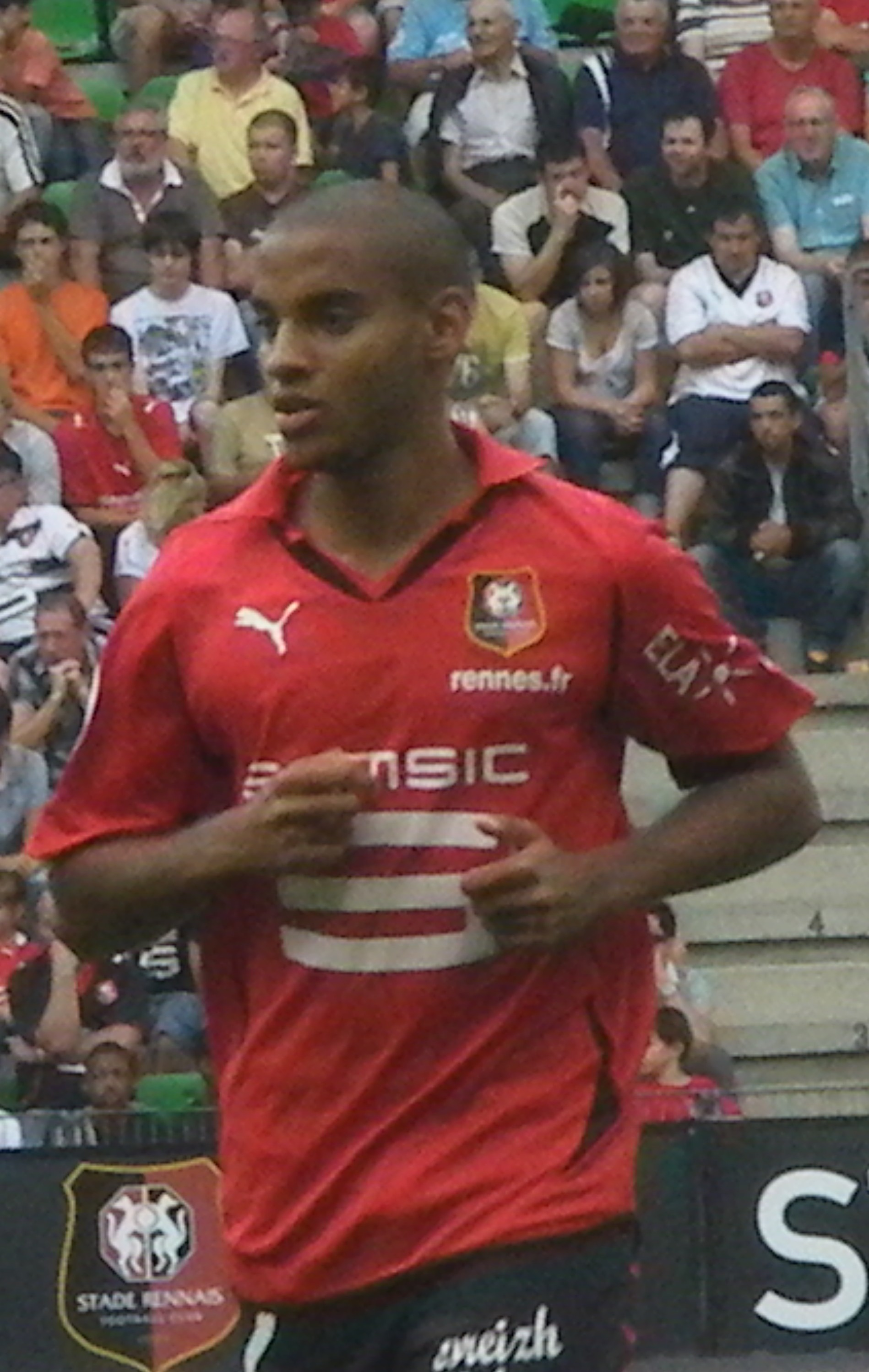
- Jebbour with Rennes in 2010

Personal information
- Date of birth: 24 January 1991 (age 35)
- Place of birth: Poitiers, France
- Height: 1.80 m (5 ft 11 in)
- Position: Right back

Youth career
- 1998–2007: Paris Saint-Germain
- 2007–2010: Rennes

Senior career*
Years	Team	Apps	(Gls)
2010–2012	Rennes B	42	(1)
2010–2013	Rennes	14	(0)
2013	→ Nancy (loan)	17	(0)
2013–2015	Montpellier	14	(0)
2013–2015	Montpellier B	9	(0)
2015	→ Varese (loan)	2	(0)
2015–2016	Bastia	4	(0)
2015	Bastia B	3	(0)
Total		105	(1)

International career
2010	Morocco U21	1	(0)
2012	Morocco U23	3	(0)
2013	Morocco	2	(0)
- * Club domestic league appearances and goals

Yassine Jebbour (born 24 January 1991) is a former professional footballer who played as a right back. Born in France, he represented Morocco at international level.

== Club career ==
In July 2015 Jebbour joined SC Bastia on a three-year contract, as part of a deal that saw Ryad Boudebouz join Montpellier HSC.

Jebbour announced his retirement in 2016.

== International career ==
Jebbour was named in Pim Verbeek's 18-man squad for the Morocco U-23 football team to compete at the London 2012 Olympics. He made his senior international début on 8 June 2013 in an official match against Tanzania.

== Personal life ==
In May 2016, Jebbour was taken into custody for "voluntary violence" towards a police officer after being arrested while driving drunk.
