= David Díaz (footballer) =

Salvadoran footballer (born 1992)

Personal information
- Full name: Josè David Díaz Ramos
- Date of birth: 20 May 1992 (age 34)
- Place of birth: San Salvador
- Height: 1.86 m (6 ft 1 in)
- Position: Forward

Team information
- Current team: C.D. Atlético Marte

Senior career*
| Years | Team | Apps | (Gls) |
| 2012–18 | Alianza | 62 | (5) |
| 2016–17 | → UES (loan) | 20 | (10) |
| 2018–19 | Águila | 7 | (1) |
| 2019–20 | Isidro Metapán | 50 | (12) |
| 2020–21 | Santa Tecla | 15 | (4) |
| 2021 | Jocoro | 14 | (1) |
| 2021–22 | Atlético Marte | 9 | (0) |

International career
| 2018– | El Salvador | 7 | (0) |
- * Club domestic league appearances and goals as of 00:15, 21 September 2022 (UTC)

José David Díaz Ramos (born 20 May 1992) is a Salvadoran footballer who plays for C.D. Atlético Marte in the Primera División de Fútbol de El Salvador.

== Career ==
In 2018 Díaz signed with A.D. Chalatenango after winning the 2017-18 Primera Division Apertura and Clausura titles with Alianza. Chalatengo had even put pictures of the contract signing on their social media platforms. However, Alianza issued a press release to say the player was actually signing with C.D. Águila. Díaz scored his first goal for Águila on 5 December 2018 in a 3-2 defeat against Santa Tecla. Díaz himself would join Santa Tecla for the 2020-21 Apertura league and posted a video of himself training with the help of his mother keeping for during the COVID-19 pandemic lockdown. Santa Tecla were managed for the delayed Apertura by a former coach of Díaz from his time at Alianza, the Argentine Juan Sarulyte.

== International career ==
He made his debut for the full El Salvador team against Honduras on the 3 June 2018.
