= Pim Verbeek =

Dutch footballer and manager (1956–2019)

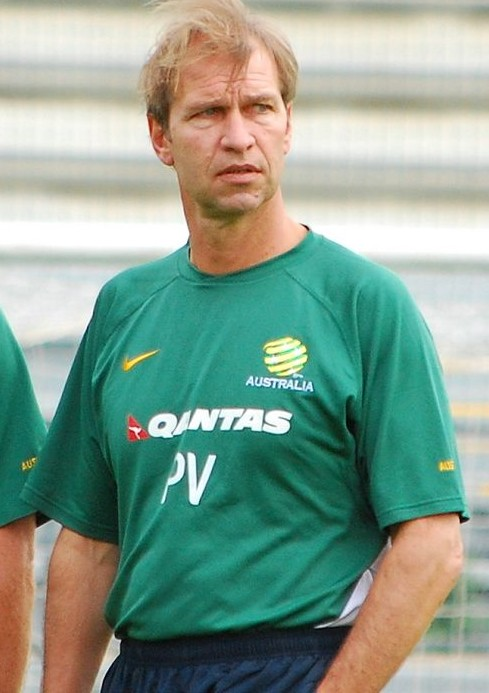
- Verbeek as Australia's head coach in September 2008

Personal information
- Full name: Peter Tim Dirk Verbeek
- Date of birth: 12 March 1956
- Place of birth: Rotterdam, Netherlands
- Date of death: 28 November 2019 (aged 63)
- Place of death: Amsterdam, Netherlands
- Positions: Defender; midfielder

Senior career*
Years	Team	Apps	(Gls)
1974–1975	Sparta Rotterdam		
1977–1980	Sparta Rotterdam		

Managerial career
- 1981–1984: DS '79
- 1984–1987: Unitas Gorinchem
- 1987–1989: De Graafschap
- 1989: Feyenoord
- 1991–1992: Wageningen
- 1992–1993: Groningen
- 1994–1997: Fortuna Sittard
- 1998–1999: Omiya Ardija
- 2001–2002: South Korea (assistant)
- 2002–2003: Jong PSV
- 2003: Kyoto Purple Sanga
- 2004: Netherlands Antilles
- 2004: Borussia Mönchengladbach (assistant)
- 2005: United Arab Emirates (assistant)
- 2005–2006: South Korea U-23
- 2005–2006: South Korea (assistant)
- 2006–2007: South Korea
- 2007–2010: Australia
- 2010–2014: Morocco U-23
- 2016–2019: Oman
Medal record
Men's football
Representing South Korea (as manager)
AFC Asian Cup
Bronze medal – third place	2007	Team
- * Club domestic league appearances and goals

Peter Tim Dirk "Pim" Verbeek (12 March 1956 – 28 November 2019) was a Dutch football manager who last coached the Oman national football team.

== Playing career ==
As a player, Verbeek was a defender or a midfielder and spent his entire career at Sparta Rotterdam. He played there for two stints: from 1974 to 1975 and from 1977 to 1980.

== Managerial career ==
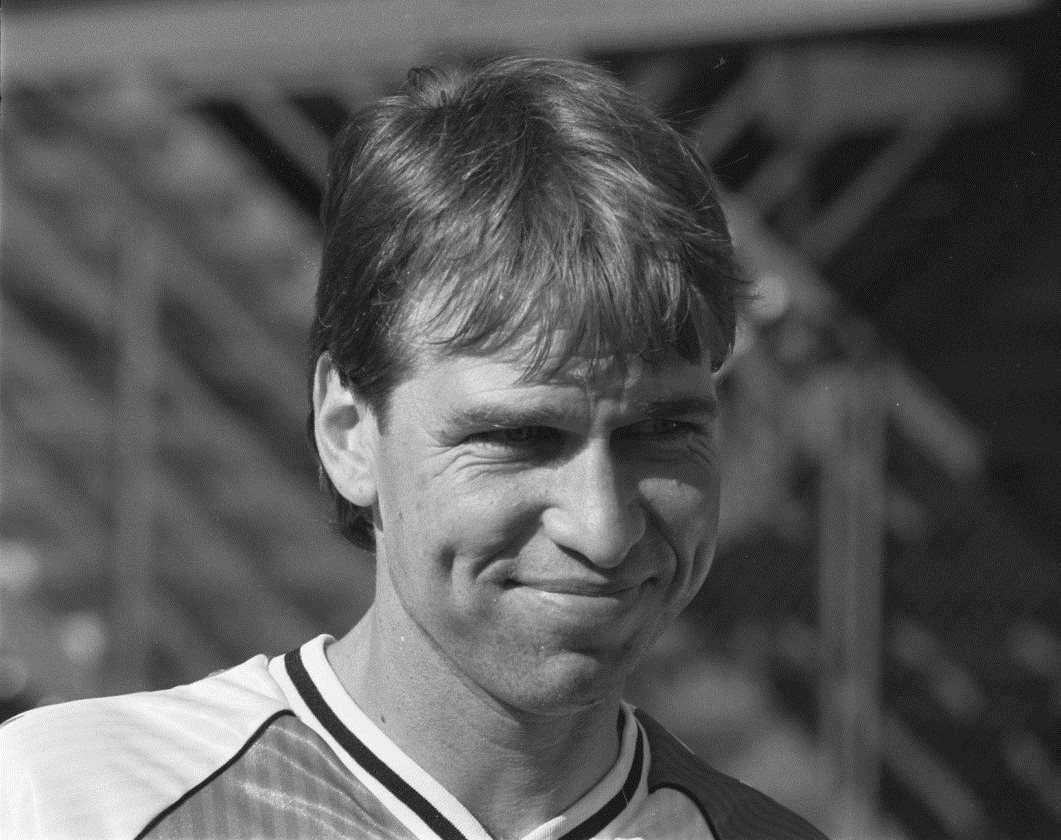
Verbeek in 1989

=== South Korea ===
Verbeek was the assistant coach of the South Korean national team under Guus Hiddink at the 2002 FIFA World Cup and also under Dick Advocaat at the 2006 FIFA World Cup. Prior to this, he coached various teams in his home country, including De Graafschap, Groningen, Fortuna Sittard and even Feyenoord. He also served as the assistant coach of the United Arab Emirates national team.

Verbeek began coaching South Korea on 26 June 2006. He led South Korea to a third-place finish at the 2007 AFC Asian Cup, guaranteeing them automatic qualification to the next tournament. He left in July 2007.

=== Australia ===
Verbeek was linked to coaching the Australian national team after he stated that he would welcome another job in Asia. He had previously been linked with the Socceroos in 2005. On 6 December 2007, it was announced that Verbeek had secured his position as Australia's coach. In his first World Cup qualifying match as head coach, he led Australia to a 3-0 win against Qatar at home.

Verbeek's poor opinion of the standard of the A-League was well-known, describing the performances of locally-based players Archie Thompson and Danny Allsopp against Indonesia as "absolutely hopeless" and openly questioning the decision of Jason Culina to leave PSV Eindhoven and return home to play in Australia. When asked about possible improvements for the quality of football in the A-League, he said "Do you have an hour?" and "I am just being honest."

Under Verbeek, the Socceroos were the second country (apart from the hosts) to qualify for the 2010 FIFA World Cup after a 0-0 draw against Qatar in June 2009, less than an hour after Japan had qualified.

Australia lost 0-4 to Germany in their opening match of the 2010 World Cup. In that match, Verbeek chose to start the match without a recognised striker. He was heavily criticised by the Australian media for refusing to play attacking players Josh Kennedy, Mark Bresciano and Harry Kewell, all of whom were proven goal-scorers at international level. Australia then drew 1-1 with Ghana and defeated Serbia 2-1. They ended their group with four points, equal with Ghana, but finished only third due to a worse goal difference and were eliminated, with Verbeek departing shortly after.

=== Morocco ===
On 8 April 2010, Verbeek was appointed as the technical director for Morocco's youth teams. His primary role was to identify and develop young talents for the Moroccan national team, which had failed to qualify for the World Cup finals and the Africa Cup of Nations in 2010.

He helped establish a new generation that would be considered as the best Moroccan side in the 21st century by nurturing a young, talented squad. At the 2011 CAF U-23 Championship on home soil, Verbeek's U-23 team became runners-up, overcoming many giants like Algeria and Egypt. This success earned Morocco qualification to the 2012 Summer Olympics, in which Verbeek was praised. Although the Atlas Lions could not succeed in a tough group, a number of players became noticed by the world, such as Nordin Amrabat and Yassine Bounou, who would go on to represent Morocco at the 2018 FIFA World Cup. After the Olympics, Verbeek left Morocco.

Many of Verbeek’s talents would form the backbone of the Moroccan squad that reached the Semi Finals of the 2022 FIFA World Cup, becoming the first African side to do so.

=== Oman ===
He was appointed as the Omani national team's coach in 2016 after their failure to qualify for the 2018 FIFA World Cup. Under his guidance, many young talented players emerged, in which Oman would eventually win the 23rd Arabian Gulf Cup held in Kuwait, which was also the country's second ever Gulf Cup and Verbeek's first ever international trophy.

However, it was the 2019 AFC Asian Cup that became Verbeek's biggest success in his coaching career. Despite losing to Uzbekistan and Japan by a single goal, Oman defeated Turkmenistan 3-1, reaching the knockout stages for the first time ever. It became the greatest success in the history of Omani football. After Oman's Asian Cup journey ended in the round of 16 with a 2-0 loss to Iran, Verbeek announced that he would retire from coaching for good.

=== Return to Sparta Rotterdam ===
On 12 February 2019, Sparta Rotterdam announced that they had reached an agreement with Verbeek about joining the club as a member of the board. He held that position until his death.

== Managerial style ==
Verbeek usually employed two holding midfielders and a sole striker up front. His teams usually played conservatively with a slow tempo, built up play gradually and heavily relied on crosses and team passes.

== Personal life and death ==
Verbeek's brother Robert is also a football coach. However, they are not related to yet another coach, Gertjan Verbeek, who also coached Feyenoord.

He died on 28 November 2019 at 63, after a four-year battle with cancer.

== Managerial statistics ==
Team	From	To	Record				
Team	From	To	G	W	D	L	Win %
Groningen	1992	1993	22	5	8	9	22.73
Fortuna Sittard	1994	1997	70	16	25	29	22.86
Omiya Ardija	1999	1999	36	18	1	17	50.00
Kyoto Purple Sanga	2003	2003	16	4	4	8	25.00
South Korea	2006	2007	17	6	6	5	35.29
Australia	2007	2010	33	18	9	6	54.55
Oman	2016	2019	23	12	5	6	52.17
Total			217	79	58	80	36.41
