= Israel Silva =

Brazilian footballer (born 1981)

Personal information
- Full name: Israel Silva Matos de Souza
- Date of birth: 24 June 1981 (age 45)
- Place of birth: São Paulo, Brazil
- Height: 1.72 m (5 ft 8 in)
- Position: Striker

Youth career
- Portuguesa

Senior career*
Years	Team	Apps	(Gls)
2000–2001	Portuguesa	0	(0)
2001–2002	Brasiliense	0	(0)
2002–2004	Teculután	39	(24)
2004–2007	Xelajú	105	(60)
2007–2008	Municipal	8	(1)
2008	Jalapa	5	(4)
2008–2010	Kerkyra	56	(16)
2010–2014	Xelajú	178	(81)
2014	Antigua	19	(1)
2015–2016	Motagua	3	(1)
2016	Marathón	14	(2)
2016	Rosario FC	0	(0)
2016	Nueva Concepción	0	(0)
2018–2019	Real de Minas	14	(5)
2020-2021	Xelajú	33	(9)
2022	Sacachispas	0	(0)
- * Club domestic league appearances and goals

Israel Silva Matos de Souza (born 24 June 1981) is a former Brazilian footballer who played as a striker.

== Club career ==
Silva started his career in Brazil but his best years as a soccer player came when he went to play in Guatemala. He started at Deportivo Teculután for whom he scored 34 goals and moved on to Xelajú MC and scored twelve goals taking them to a final and won by beating Marquense. Then CSD Municipal put their eye on him and he was transferred there in December 2007. He did not have the best season so the team let him go. Deportivo Jalapa decided to buy him and little by little he became the player he once was. An offer to play in Greece was presented and left to play in Kerkyra.

Silva is Xelajú's all-time leader with 176 goals, helping the club win the league championship in 2012.

== Naturalization ==
During the time that Silva was playing in Guatemala he decided to give up his Brazilian citizenship to receive the Guatemalan. He is said that he would love to play for the Guatemala national football team.

== Post-retirement ==
In September 2022, Silva was appointed as a coach at the Xtreme Soccer Xela high-performance academy in Quetzaltenango, where he would work close together with another former Brazilian footballer, Sandro Zamboni.

Silva later also started his own academy called Academia De Fútbol Israel Silva.
