= Maylor Núñez =

Honduran footballer (born 1996)

Personal information
- Full name: Maylor Alberto Núñez Flores
- Date of birth: 5 July 1996 (age 30)
- Place of birth: La Ceiba, Honduras
- Height: 1.81 m (5 ft 11 in)
- Position: Right-back

Team information
- Current team: Olimpia
- Number: 2

Senior career*
Years	Team	Apps	(Gls)
2015–2018	Motagua	2	(0)
2016–2017	→Platense (loan)	17	(1)
2018	Juticalpa	29	(1)
2018–	Olimpia	118	(1)

International career^{‡}
2014–2015	Honduras U20	3	(0)
2014	Honduras U21	1	(0)
2021–	Honduras	13	(0)
- * Club domestic league appearances and goals as of 22 May 2021 (UTC) ‡ National team caps and goals as of 27 March 2021 (UTC)

Maylor Alberto Núñez Flores (born 5 July 1996) is a Honduran professional footballer who plays as a right-back for Liga Nacional de Honduras club Olimpia and the Honduras national team

== Career ==
Nuñez made his professional debut with Motagua in a 1–0 Liga Nacional loss to C.D. Real Sociedad on 2 May 2015. On 18 November 2018, he signed a professional contract with Olimpia.

== International career ==
Nuñez made his senior debut with the Honduras national team in a friendly 1–1 tie with Belarus on 24 March 2021.
