= Júnior Izaguirre =

Honduran footballer (born 1979)

Junior Izaguirre
Personal information
- Full name: Junior Gustavo Izaguirre Puerto
- Date of birth: 12 August 1979 (age 47)
- Place of birth: Tegucigalpa, Honduras
- Height: 1.83 m (6 ft 0 in)
- Position: Defender

Senior career*
| Years | Team | Apps | (Gls) |
| 1997–2005 | Motagua | 178 | (31) |
| 2005–2006 | Peñarol | 1 | (0) |
| 2006–2007 | Marathón | 29 | (0) |
| 2007–2010 | Victoria | 102 | (2) |
| 2011–2016 | Motagua | 186 | (6) |

International career^{‡}
| 1998–1999 | Honduras U20 | | |
| 2000–2007 | Honduras | 27 | (2) |
- * Club domestic league appearances and goals as of 18 December 2016 ‡ National team caps and goals as of 2007

Junior Gustavo Izaguirre Puerto (born 12 August 1979) is a Honduran retired football defender, who most recently played for F.C. Motagua in the Honduran Liga Nacional.

== Club career ==
Izaguirre started his professional career at Honduran giants F.C. Motagua with whom he stayed for 8 years. He was the hero of the 2001 Apertura championship final when he scored all three of Motagua's goals against Marathón. In 2005, he moved abroad only for an unsuccessful campaign at Uruguayan top team Peñarol, due to an injury. He only played one match for them before his contract was terminated in April 2006. He returned to Honduras to have a short spell at Marathón, then signed for Victoria. He returned to his first club, F.C. Motagua, before the 2011 Clausura championship.

He is the top-scoring defender of Honduran football with 37 goals.

== International career ==
Izaguirre played at the 1999 FIFA World Youth Championship and was a member of the national squad at the 2000 Summer Olympics in Sydney. Izaguirre then won many caps for the Honduras national football team around the start of the 21st century, playing regularly in central defense.

He made his international debut against Canada on May 30, 2000, and received his final cap against Nicaragua on February 15, 2007. The high point of Izaguirre's international career came in the consolation match of the 2001 Copa América against Uruguay, when he scored in regulation time and hit the decisive penalty in the shootout to secure third-place honors for Honduras. He has represented his country in 2 FIFA World Cup qualification matches and played at the 2001 and 2007 UNCAF Nations Cups as well as at the 2005 CONCACAF Gold Cup.

=== International goals ===
Scores and results list Honduras' goal tally first.

| N. | Date | Venue | Opponent | Score | Result | Competition |
|---|---|---|---|---|---|---|
| 1. | 29 July 2001 | Estadio Nemesio Camacho, Bogotá, Colombia | Uruguay | 2–1 | 2–2 | 2001 Copa América |
| 2. | 3 August 2004 | Estadio Cuscatlán, San Salvador, El Salvador | El Salvador | 1–0 | 4–0 | friendly match |
