= Irvin Reyna =

Honduran footballer (born 1987)

Personal information
- Full name: Irvin Josué Reyna Zavala
- Date of birth: 7 June 1987 (age 39)
- Place of birth: Tela, Honduras
- Height: 1.78 m (5 ft 10 in)
- Position: Midfielder

Team information
- Current team: Honduras Progreso

Senior career*
Years	Team	Apps	(Gls)
2007–2010	Olimpia	25	(0)
2010–2011	Necaxa		
2012–2013	Olimpia		
2014–2017	Motagua	119	(3)
2018	Honduras Progreso	0	(0)
2018–	Real De Minas	0	(0)

International career^{‡}
2006	Honduras U-20	2	(0)
2008	Honduras U-23	3	(0)
2010	Honduras	1	(0)
Medal record
Honduras
First place	CONCACAF Pre-Olympic Tournament	2008
- * Club domestic league appearances and goals as of 4 July 2018 ‡ National team caps and goals as of 23 March 2013

Irvin Josué Reyna Zavala (born 7 June 1987) is a Honduran football player, who currently plays for C.D. Real De Minas in the Honduran Liga Nacional.

== Club career ==
Reyna started his career at Club Deportivo Olimpia but joined C.D. Necaxa for the 2010 Apertura championship.

He then returned to Olimpia for the 2012 Clausura championship.

== International career ==
Reyna was part of the U-23 Honduras national football team that won the 2008 CONCACAF Men's Pre-Olympic Tournament and qualified to the 2008 Summer Olympics. He made his senior debut for Honduras in a September 2010 friendly match against El Salvador which has proved to be his only cap still as of May 2013.
