= Marlon Ramírez =

Honduran footballer (born 1994)

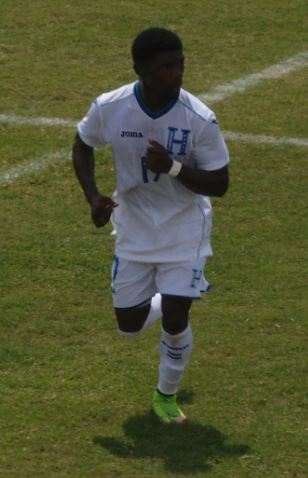
- Ramírez in 2015.

Personal information
- Full name: Marlon Roberto Ramírez Arauz
- Date of birth: 17 April 1994 (age 32)
- Place of birth: Rio Esteban, Honduras
- Height: 1.67 m (5 ft 6 in)
- Position: Forward

Team information
- Current team: Olancho
- Number: 30

Senior career*
Years	Team	Apps	(Gls)
2013	Vida	2	(0)
2013–2014	Vancouver Whitecaps	0	(0)
2014	→ Charleston Battery (loan)	1	(0)
2014–2015	Motagua	4	(0)
2015–2016	Victoria		
2016–2017	Vida	29	(5)
2017–2018	Juticalpa	19	(3)
2018	ENPPI		
2018–2021	Marathón	27	(2)
2019	→ Honduras Progreso (loan)	16	(1)
2021–2022	UPNFM	15	(11)
2022–2023	FC Tulsa	26	(3)
2023–2024	Victoria	27	(2)
2024–2025	Génesis	34	(3)
2025–	Olancho	15	(4)

International career^{‡}
2025	Honduras	2	(0)
- * Club domestic league appearances and goals as of 15:34, 14 November 2025 (UTC) ‡ National team caps and goals as of 15 November 2025

Marlon Roberto Ramírez Arauz (born 17 April 1994) is a Honduran professional footballer who plays as a forward for Liga Nacional club Olancho FC.

== Career ==
Ramirez started his senior career with C.D.S. Vida. In 2013, he signed for Whitecaps 2 in the American USL Championship, where he made five league appearances and scored zero goals. After that, he played for Charleston Battery, Motagua, C.D. Victoria, Juticalpa, ENPPI SC, C.D. Honduras Progreso, C.D. Marathón, and Lobos UPNFM.

On 14 January 2022, Machuca signed with FC Tulsa in the USL Championship. He was released by Tulsa following the 2022 season.
