= Sebastián Portigliatti =

Argentine footballer

Personal information
- Date of birth: 1 March 1985 (age 41)
- Place of birth: San Francisco, Córdoba, Argentina
- Height: 1.84 m (6 ft 1/2 in)
- Position: Goalkeeper

Team information
- Current team: Juticalpa

Senior career*
Years	Team	Apps	(Gls)
2007–2008	Sportivo Belgrano		
2008–2009	Ferro Carril Oeste		
2009	Sportivo Belgrano		
2010	ASD Misano		
2010–2011	Juventud de Pergamino		
2011–2012	El Linqueño		
2012–2013	San Martín de Mendoza		
2013	Jorge Newbery		
2013–2016	Motagua	79	(0)
2016–	Juticalpa	0	(0)
- * Club domestic league appearances and goals as of 25 June 2016

Sebastián Portigliatti (born 1 March 1985) is an Argentine footballer who plays as goalkeeper for Juticalpa F.C. in the Honduran Liga Nacional.

== Honours ==
Motagua

- Honduran Liga Nacional: Apertura 2014–15
