= Lucas Gómez (footballer) =

Argentinian footballer

Personal information
- Full name: Lucas Emanuel Gómez Benites
- Date of birth: 6 October 1987 (age 39)
- Place of birth: Mendoza, Argentina
- Height: 1.82 m (6 ft 0 in)
- Position: Striker

Team information
- Current team: USAC

Senior career*
| Years | Team | Apps | (Gls) |
| 2004–2007 | Independiente Rivadavia | | |
| 2007–2008 | Almagro | | |
| 2008–2011 | Brujas | 30 | (10) |
| 2011–2012 | Alumni (VM) | | (5) |
| 2012–2013 | Deportivo Armenio | 20 | (1) |
| 2013–2014 | UCR | 36 | (16) |
| 2014–2016 | Motagua | 69 | (30) |
| 2016 | Alajuelense | 10 | (2) |
| 2017 | Cartaginés | 16 | (5) |
| 2017 | Deportivo Lara | 21 | (10) |
| 2018 | Neftçi | 14 | (2) |
| 2018 | Juan Aurich | 10 | (6) |
| 2019 | Deportivo Táchira | 39 | (16) |
| 2020–2022 | Real Santa Cruz | 10 | (3) |
| 2022-2023 | Antigua | 40 | (16) |
| 2023-2024 | Xinabajul | 16 | (3) |
| 2024- | USAC | 0 | (0) |
- * Club domestic league appearances and goals as of 23 March 2023

Lucas Emanuel Gómez Benites (born 6 October 1987) is an Argentine professional footballer who plays as striker for Primera División club USAC.

== Club career ==
On 30 January 2018, Neftchi Baku announced the signing of Gómez on a one-year contract. On 24 June 2018, Gómez was demoted to the Neftchi's reserve team, along with Mike Campaz, for the remainder of his contract.
