= Ricardo Rosales (footballer) =

Argentine footballer

Personal information
- Full name: Ricardo Emanuel Rosales Valle
- Date of birth: 6 June 1993 (age 33)
- Place of birth: Godoy Cruz, Argentina
- Height: 1.66 m (5 ft 5 in)
- Position: Midfielder

Team information
- Current team: Provincial Osorno

Youth career
- Boca Juniors
- Independiente
- Godoy Cruz

Senior career*
Years	Team	Apps	(Gls)
2015	Motagua	11	(1)
2016	Huracán Las Heras	6	(0)
2016–2017	Gutiérrez	6	(0)
2017	Luján de Cuyo	17	(2)
2018	Fundación Amigos	–	(–)
2018–2019	All Boys	10	(0)
2019	San Miguel	3	(0)
2020–2021	Cobreloa	13	(0)
2021	Unión San Felipe	21	(2)
2022–2023	Deportes Puerto Montt	48	(3)
2024	Huracán Las Heras	5	(0)
2024–	Provincial Osorno	0	(0)
- * Club domestic league appearances and goals as of 3 July 2024

Ricardo Emanuel Rosales Valle (born 6 June 1993) is an Argentine-Chilean professional footballer who plays as a midfielder for Provincial Osorno.

== Club career ==
Rosales played in the youth systems of Boca Juniors, Independiente and Godoy Cruz. In 2015, Rosales moved to Honduras to join Motagua. He departed the club on 27 May. 2016 saw Huracán Las Heras sign Rosales. Six appearances followed in Torneo Federal B. He subsequently spent 2016–17 in Torneo Federal A with Gutiérrez, appearing for his debut in a home loss to Unión de Villa Krause on 22 October 2016. Rosales joined Luján de Cuyo in June 2017, with two goals in seventeen following. He then agreed a contract with Torneo Federal C's Fundación Amigos in 2018, where he'd win promotion to Torneo Regional Federal Amateur.

On 2 August 2018, Rosales went to Primera B Metropolitana with All Boys. His first appearance arrived on 24 August versus Fénix, coming off the bench in place of Cristián Sánchez.

In 2021, he played for Unión San Felipe. The next season, he switched to Deportes Puerto Montt.

In March 2024, Rosales returned to Argentina and joined Huracán Las Heras. Back to Chile, he joined Provincial Osorno of the Segunda División Profesional in June of the same year.

== International career ==
Born in Argentina, Rosales is of Chilean descent and holds both passports. In 2013, Rosales trained with the Argentina U20s ahead of the 2013 South American Youth Championship; though didn't make the official squad.

== Career statistics ==
As of 3 May 2019.

Appearances and goals by club, season and competition
Club	Season	League			Cup		Continental		Other		Total	
Club	Season	Division	Apps	Goals	Apps	Goals	Apps	Goals	Apps	Goals	Apps	Goals
Motagua	2014–15	Liga Nacional	11	1	0	0	—		0	0	11	1
Huracán Las Heras	2016	Torneo Federal B	6	0	0	0	—		0	0	6	0
Gutiérrez	2016–17	Torneo Federal A	6	0	0	0	—		5 (Note: Appearance(s) in the Torneo Federal A play-offs)	0	11	0
Luján de Cuyo	2017	Torneo Federal B	17	2	0	0	—		0	0	17	2
All Boys	2018–19	Primera B Metropolitana	10	0	0	0	—		0	0	10	0
Career total			50	3	0	0	—		5	0	55	3
