= Orlin Peralta =

Honduran footballer (born 1990)

Personal information
- Full name: Orlin Orlando Peralta Gonzáles
- Date of birth: 12 February 1990 (age 36)
- Place of birth: Guanaja, Honduras
- Height: 1.66 m (5 ft 5 in)
- Position: Defender

Senior career*
Years	Team	Apps	(Gls)
2008–2013	Vida		
2013–	Motagua	1	(0)

International career^{‡}
2012–	Honduras	5	(0)
- * Club domestic league appearances and goals as of 14 August 2013 ‡ National team caps and goals as of 1 April 2013

Orlin Orlando Peralta Gonzáles (born 12 February 1990) is a Honduran footballer who plays as a left back for F.C. Motagua.

== Club career ==
Peralta played for Vida from 2008 to 2013. On 26 June 2013, he signed for F.C. Motagua.

== International career ==
Peralta played for Honduras at the 2007 FIFA U-17 World Cup in Republic of Korea and represented the country at the 2012 Summer Olympics.

He made his senior debut for Honduras in a February 2012 FIFA World Cup qualification match against Cuba and has, as of April 2013, earned a total of 4 caps, scoring no goals. He has represented his country in 1 FIFA World Cup qualification match and played at the 2013 Copa Centroamericana.
