= 2016–17 in Honduran football =

Football in Honduras
- Season: 2016–17

Men's football
- Liga Nacional: Apertura: Motagua; Clausura: Motagua
- Liga de Ascenso: Apertura: Lepaera; Clausura: UPNFM
- Honduran Cup: Marathón
- Honduran Supercup: Juticalpa; Olimpia

The 2016–17 season is the 69th season of competitive association football in Honduras.

== National teams ==
=== Senior team ===
==== FIFA World Cup qualification ====
Pos	Team	Pld	W	D	L	GF	GA	GD	Pts	Qualification	Mexico	Honduras	Canada	El Salvador
1	Mexico	6	5	1	0	13	1	+12	16	Advance to fifth round	—	0–0	2–0	3–0
2	Honduras	6	2	2	2	6	6	0	8	Advance to fifth round	0–2	—	2–1	2–0
3	Canada	6	2	1	3	5	8	−3	7		0–3	1–0	—	3–1
4	El Salvador	6	0	2	4	4	13	−9	2		1–3	2–2	0–0	—

Source: FIFA
Rules for classification: Qualification tiebreakers

Pos	Team	Pld	W	D	L	GF	GA	GD	Pts	Qualification	(Mexico)	(Costa Rica)	(Panama)	(Honduras)	(United States)	(Trinidad and Tobago)
1	Mexico	10	6	3	1	16	7	+9	21	Qualification to 2018 FIFA World Cup	—	2–0	1–0	3–0	1–1	3–1
2	Costa Rica	10	4	4	2	14	8	+6	16	Qualification to 2018 FIFA World Cup	1–1	—	0–0	1–1	4–0	2–1
3	Panama	10	3	4	3	9	10	−1	13	Qualification to 2018 FIFA World Cup	0–0	2–1	—	2–2	1–1	3–0
4	Honduras	10	3	4	3	13	19	−6	13	Advance to inter-confederation play-offs	3–2	1–1	0–1	—	1–1	3–1
5	United States	10	3	3	4	17	13	+4	12		1–2	0–2	4–0	6–0	—	2–0
6	Trinidad and Tobago	10	2	0	8	7	19	−12	6		0–1	0–2	1–0	1–2	2–1	—

Source: FIFA
Rules for classification: Qualification tiebreakers

==== Copa Centroamericana ====
Pos	Team	Pld	W	D	L	GF	GA	GD	Pts	Qualification
1	Honduras (C)	5	4	1	0	7	3	+4	13	Qualification to 2017 CONCACAF Gold Cup
2	Panama (H)	5	3	1	1	4	2	+2	10	Qualification to 2017 CONCACAF Gold Cup
3	El Salvador	5	2	1	2	5	4	+1	7	Qualification to 2017 CONCACAF Gold Cup
4	Costa Rica	5	1	3	1	4	2	+2	6	Qualification to 2017 CONCACAF Gold Cup
5	Nicaragua	5	1	1	3	5	6	−1	4	Advance to 2017 CONCACAF Gold Cup CFU–UNCAF play-off
6	Belize	5	0	1	4	2	10	−8	1	

Source: CONCACAF
Rules for classification: 1) Points; 2) Goal difference; 3) Goals scored; 4) Points in matches between tied teams; 5) Goal difference in matches between tied teams; 6) Goals scored in matches between tied teams; 7) Drawing of lots (Regulations Article 8.4).
(C) Champions; (H) Hosts

=== Olympic team ===
==== Summer Olympics ====
Pos	Team	Pld	W	D	L	GF	GA	GD	Pts	Qualification
1	Portugal	3	2	1	0	5	2	+3	7	Quarter-finals
2	Honduras	3	1	1	1	5	5	0	4	Quarter-finals
3	Argentina	3	1	1	1	3	4	−1	4	
4	Algeria	3	0	1	2	4	6	−2	1	

Source: Rio2016 & FIFA
Rules for classification: Tiebreakers

Quarter-finals
13 August – São Paulo
Brazil	2
Colombia	0
13 August – Belo Horizonte
South Korea	0
Honduras	1
13 August – Salvador
Nigeria	2
Denmark	0
13 August – Brasília
Portugal	0
Germany	4

Semi-finals
17 August – Rio de Janeiro (Maracanã)
Brazil	6
Honduras	0
17 August – São Paulo
Nigeria	0
Germany	2

Gold medal match
20 August – Rio de Janeiro (Maracanã)
Brazil (p)	1 (5)
Germany	1 (4)
Bronze medal match
20 August – Belo Horizonte
Honduras	2
Nigeria	3

==== Other matches ====
20 July 2016 Friendly	Honduras	1–2	Honduras Progreso	Comayagua, Comayagua
15:00 CST	Salas 34'		5' 35' Tejeda	Stadium: Estadio Carlos Miranda; Attendance: Open gates

20 July 2016 Friendly	Honduras	1–2	Motagua	Comayagua, Comayagua
17:00 CST	Lozano 55'		40' (pen.) Castillo; 60' Vega	Stadium: Estadio Carlos Miranda; Attendance: Open gates

24 July 2016 Friendly	Colombia	2–0	Honduras	Cartagena, Colombia
18:00 EST	Preciado 34'; Gutiérrez 84'	Report		Stadium: Estadio Jaime Morón León

27 July 2016 Friendly	Honduras	0–0	Real España	San Pedro Sula, Cortés
EST		Report		Stadium: Estadio Francisco Morazán

=== U-20 team ===
==== CONCACAF U-20 Championship ====
Qualification
Pos	Team	Pld	W	D	L	GF	GA	GD	Pts	Qualification
1	Honduras	4	2	2	0	7	4	+3	8	2017 CONCACAF U-20 Championship
2	El Salvador	4	2	1	1	9	4	+5	7	2017 CONCACAF U-20 Championship
3	Guatemala	4	1	2	1	5	5	0	5	Disqualified due to FIFA suspension
4	Panama (H)	4	1	1	2	7	4	+3	4	2017 CONCACAF U-20 Championship
5	Nicaragua	4	1	0	3	1	12	−11	3	
6	Belize	0	0	0	0	0	0	0	0	Withdrew

Source: UNCAF
(H) Hosts

Group A
Pos	Team	Pld	W	D	L	GF	GA	GD	Pts	Qualification
1	Mexico	3	3	0	0	9	0	+9	9	Classification stage
2	Honduras	3	2	0	1	5	2	+3	6	Classification stage
3	Canada	3	1	0	2	2	6	−4	3	
4	Antigua and Barbuda	3	0	0	3	1	9	−8	0	

Source: CONCACAF
Rules for classification: Group stage tiebreakers

Group E
Pos	Team	Pld	W	D	L	GF	GA	GD	Pts	Qualification
1	Honduras	2	2	0	0	4	1	+3	6	Final and 2017 FIFA U-20 World Cup
2	Costa Rica (H)	2	0	1	1	2	3	−1	1	2017 FIFA U-20 World Cup
3	Panama	2	0	1	1	1	3	−2	1	

Source: CONCACAF
Rules for classification: Group stage tiebreakers
(H) Hosts
Final
5 March 2017
15:00

United States	0–0	Honduras
	Report
Penalties
Lennon (penalty scored); Craft (penalty scored); Sabbi (penalty scored); De La Torre (penalty scored); Acosta (penalty scored)	5–3	(penalty scored) Álvarez; (penalty scored) Martínez; (penalty scored) Grant; (penalty missed) Flores

Estadio Nacional, San José
Referee: Henry Bejarano (Costa Rica)

==== FIFA U-20 World Cup ====
Pos	Team	Pld	W	D	L	GF	GA	GD	Pts	Qualification
1	France	3	3	0	0	9	0	+9	9	Knockout stage
2	New Zealand	3	1	1	1	3	3	0	4	Knockout stage
3	Honduras	3	1	0	2	3	6	−3	3	
4	Vietnam	3	0	1	2	0	6	−6	1	

Source: FIFA
Rules for classification: Group stage tiebreakers

==== Other matches ====
31 January 2017 Friendly	Honduras	3–2	Costa Rica	Comayagua, Honduras
18:00 CST	Vuelto (?); Pineda (?)		(?) Reyes (?) Carmona	Stadium: Estadio Carlos Miranda; Attendance: Open gates

3 February 2017 Friendly	Honduras	2–0	Costa Rica	Comayagua, Honduras
17:00 CST	Vuelto; Martínez 80'			Stadium: Estadio Carlos Miranda

26 April 2017 Friendly	Honduras	1–1	Venezuela	Comayagua, Honduras
CST	Álvarez (penalty missed) 78'		88' Chacón	Stadium: Estadio Carlos Miranda

15 May 2017 Friendly	Japan	3–2	Honduras	Itakura, Japan
JST			Álvarez; Vuelto

=== U-17 team ===
==== CONCACAF U-17 Championship ====
Pos	Team	Pld	W	D	L	GF	GA	GD	Pts	Qualification
1	Costa Rica (H)	4	4	0	0	16	0	+16	12	2017 CONCACAF U-17 Championship
2	Honduras	4	2	0	2	7	7	0	6	2017 CONCACAF U-17 Championship
3	El Salvador	4	2	0	2	4	6	−2	6	2017 CONCACAF U-17 Championship
4	Nicaragua	4	2	0	2	5	11	−6	6	
5	Belize	4	0	0	4	3	11	−8	0	
6	Guatemala	0	0	0	0	0	0	0	0	Excluded due to FIFA suspension

(H) Hosts

Pos	Team	Pld	W	D	L	GF	GA	GD	Pts	Qualification
1	Panama (H)	3	2	1	0	5	2	+3	7	Classification stage
2	Honduras	3	2	0	1	8	5	+3	6	Classification stage
3	Curaçao	3	1	0	2	1	4	−3	3	
4	Haiti	3	0	1	2	1	4	−3	1	

Source: CONCACAF
Rules for classification: Group stage tiebreakers
(H) Hosts

Pos	Team	Pld	W	D	L	GF	GA	GD	Pts	Qualification
1	United States	2	2	0	0	9	2	+7	6	Final and 2017 FIFA U-17 World Cup
2	Honduras	2	1	0	1	7	4	+3	3	2017 FIFA U-17 World Cup
3	Cuba	2	0	0	2	3	13	−10	0	

Source: CONCACAF
Rules for classification: Group stage tiebreakers

==== Other matches ====
23 August 2016 Friendly	Honduras	2–2	El Salvador	Comayagua, Honduras
CST	Martínez; Mejía			Stadium: Estadio Carlos Miranda

20 September 2016 Friendly	El Salvador	2–1	Honduras	San Salvador, El Salvador
CST	Cheves; García		Mejía	Stadium: FESFUT Complex

22 September 2016 Friendly	El Salvador	1–0	Honduras	San Salvador, El Salvador
15:30 CST	Ávila			Stadium: FESFUT Complex

== Domestic clubs ==
=== Promotion and relegation ===
League	Promoted to league	Relegated from league
Liga Nacional	Social Sol	Social Sol
Liga de Ascenso	Discua Nicolás; Estrella Roja	CARDVA

=== Summer transfers ===
Date	Name	Moving from	Moving to	Ref.
12 May 2016	(Brazil) Josimar Moreira	(Honduras) Marathón	TBD	
12 May 2016	(Colombia) William Zapata	(Honduras) Marathón	TBD	
18 May 2016	(Argentina) Luciano Ursino	Unattached	(Honduras) Real España	
19 May 2016	(Honduras) John Bodden	(Honduras) Victoria	(Honduras) Marathón	
19 May 2016	(Honduras) Rafael Zúniga	(Honduras) Marathón	(Honduras) Juticalpa	
19 May 2016	(Honduras) Orlin Peralta	(Honduras) Motagua	TBD	
19 May 2016	(Honduras) Néstor Martínez	(Honduras) Motagua	(Honduras) Platense	
24 May 2016	(Honduras) Jorge Zaldívar	Honduras Progreso	(Guatemala) Antigua	
25 May 2016	(Brazil) Douglas Caetano	(Honduras) Juticalpa	TBD	
27 May 2016	(Colombia) Mario Abadía	(Honduras) Victoria	Honduras Progreso	
30 May 2016	(Honduras) José Tobías	(Honduras) Real Sociedad	(Honduras) Olimpia	
30 May 2016	(Uruguay) Bruno Foliados	(Honduras) Real España	TBD	
30 May 2016	(Colombia) Robert Campaz	(Honduras) Platense	TBD	
31 May 2016	(Argentina) Lucas Gómez	(Honduras) Motagua	(Costa Rica) Alajuelense	
1 June 2016	(Honduras) Christian Altamirano	(Honduras) Real Sociedad	(Honduras) Real España	
1 June 2016	(Honduras) Román Castillo	(Mexico) Correcaminos	(Honduras) Motagua	
2 June 2016	(Honduras) Arnold Meléndez	(Honduras) Jaguares de UPNFM	(Honduras) Motagua	
3 June 2016	(Honduras) Alexander Aguilar	(Honduras) Platense	(Honduras) Juticalpa	
6 June 2016	(Honduras) Ian Osorio	(Honduras) Platense	(Honduras) Marathón	
6 June 2016	(Brazil) Israel Silva	(Honduras) Motagua	(Honduras) Marathón	
6 June 2016	(Panama) Richard Dixon	(Costa Rica) Limón	(Honduras) Platense	
6 June 2016	(Honduras) Nixon Duarte	(Honduras) Platense	Honduras Progreso	
7 June 2016	(Panama) Brunet Hay	(Costa Rica) Limón	(Honduras) Platense	
7 June 2016	(Colombia) Charles Córdoba	(Honduras) Parrillas One	(Honduras) Marathón	
7 June 2016	(Honduras) Harold Fonseca	(Honduras) Juticalpa	(Honduras) Motagua	
8 June 2016	(Argentina) Martín Pucheta	(Argentina) Deportivo Maipú	(Honduras) Motagua	
8 June 2016	(Honduras) Carlos Discua	(Costa Rica) Alajuelense	(Honduras) Motagua	
9 June 2016	(Honduras) Edwin León	Honduras Progreso	(Honduras) Juticalpa	
10 June 2016	(Honduras) Allan Lalín	(Honduras) Real España	TBD	
18 June 2016	(Honduras) Roger Rojas	(Honduras) Olimpia	(Mexico) Cimarrones	
21 June 2016	(Colombia) Jhovany Mina	(Honduras) Alianza de Becerra	(Honduras) Real España	
22 June 2016	(Honduras) Julio de León	(Honduras) Platense	(United States) Miami United	
23 June 2016	(Honduras) Porciano Ávila	(Honduras) Victoria	(Honduras) Juticalpa	
23 June 2016	(Honduras) Jesús Munguía	(Honduras) Deportes Savio	(Honduras) Juticalpa	
24 June 2016	(Honduras) Ever Alvarado	(Honduras) Olimpia	(United States) Sporting Kansas City	
24 June 2016	(Honduras) Juan Rodríguez	(Honduras) Parrillas One	(Honduras) Marathón	
25 June 2016	(Honduras) Emil Martínez	Unattached	(Honduras) Marathón	
25 June 2016	(Honduras) Marco Vega	(Honduras) Real Sociedad	(Honduras) Motagua	
25 June 2016	(Argentina) Sebastián Portigliatti	(Honduras) Motagua	(Honduras) Juticalpa	
27 June 2016	(Honduras) Misael Ruíz	(Honduras) Real Sociedad	(Honduras) Olimpia	
27 June 2016	(Honduras) Jerrick Díaz	(Honduras) Platense	(Honduras) Social Sol	
28 June 2016	(Honduras) Gerson Rodas	(Honduras) Real España	(Honduras) Olimpia	
28 June 2016	(Honduras) Alexander López	(Honduras) Olimpia	(Saudi Arabia) Khaleej	
28 June 2016	(Honduras) Kevin Espinoza	(Honduras) Villanueva	(Honduras) Marathón	
30 June 2016	(Costa Rica) Roy Smith	(Costa Rica) Cartaginés	Honduras Progreso	
4 July 2016	(Honduras) Carlos Pavón Jr.	(Honduras) Olimpia	(Honduras) Marathón	
1 July 2016	(Honduras) Donaldo Morales	(Honduras) Real Sociedad	(Honduras) Social Sol	
2 July 2016	(Honduras) Shalton Arzú	(Honduras) Social Sol	(Honduras) Real Sociedad	
2 July 2016	(Honduras) Armando Cárcamo	(Honduras) Social Sol	(Honduras) Real Sociedad	
4 July 2016	(Honduras) Romell Corea	(Honduras) Platense	(Honduras) Social Sol	
6 July 2016	(Honduras) Darwin Bermúdez	(Honduras) Marathón	Honduras Progreso	
18 July 2016	(Brazil) Fábio de Souza	(Honduras) Olimpia	TBD	
18 July 2016	(Honduras) Maylor Núñez	(Honduras) Motagua	(Honduras) Platense	
20 July 2016	(Argentina) Domingo Zalazar	(Guatemala) Suchitepéquez	(Honduras) Real España	
21 July 2016	(Honduras) Bryan Róchez	(United States) Orlando City	(Honduras) Real España	
22 July 2016	(Honduras) Wesley Decas	(Honduras) Pumas	(Honduras) Motagua	
25 July 2016	(Colombia) Yuberney Franco	(Colombia) Jaguares de Córdoba	(Honduras) Platense	
27 July 2016	(Colombia) Jhon Sánchez	(Colombia) Atlético Nacional	(Honduras) Olimpia	
27 July 2016	(Colombia) Guillermo Sierra	(Colombia) Unión Magdalena	(Honduras) Olimpia	
27 July 2016	(Honduras) Walter Lapresti	(Honduras) Deportes Savio	(Honduras) Vida	
28 July 2016	(Honduras) Luis Garrido	unattached	(Honduras) Olimpia	
29 July 2016	(Honduras) Marcelo Canales	(Honduras) Vida	(Honduras) Olimpia	
29 July 2016	(Honduras) Luis Palacios	(Honduras) Marathón	(Honduras) Platense	
29 July 2016	(Honduras) Georgie Welcome	(Honduras) Platense	(Honduras) Arsenal	
29 July 2016	(Honduras) Jerry Palacios	(Honduras) Real Sociedad	(Honduras) Vida	
30 July 2016	(Honduras) Secundino Martínez	(Honduras) Vida	(Honduras) Juticalpa	
2 August 2016	(Honduras) Obed Enamorado	(Honduras) Deportes Savio	(Honduras) Real Sociedad	
2 August 2016	(Honduras) Román Valencia	(Honduras) Real España	(Honduras) Social Sol	
9 August 2016	(Honduras) Deybi Flores	(Canada) Vancouver Whitecaps	(Honduras) Motagua	
16 August 2016	(Honduras) Alfredo Mejía	(Greece) Panthrakikos	(Honduras) Marathón	
23 August 2016	(Colombia) Javier Estupiñán	(Honduras) Olimpia	TBD	
25 August 2016	(Honduras) Alberth Elis	(Honduras) Olimpia	(Mexico) Monterrey	
25 August 2016	(Honduras) Víctor Ortiz	(Honduras) Victoria	(Honduras) Social Sol	
9 September 2016	(Honduras) Jesús Navas	(Guatemala) Suchitepéquez	Honduras Progreso	
20 October 2016	(Honduras) Julio Bernárdez	(Honduras) Social Sol	TBD	
20 October 2016	(Honduras) Juan Arzú	(Honduras) Social Sol	TBD	
20 October 2016	(Honduras) Bayron García	(Honduras) Social Sol	TBD	
20 October 2016	(Honduras) Román Valencia	(Honduras) Social Sol	TBD	
20 October 2016	(Honduras) Gerson Díaz	(Honduras) Social Sol	TBD	
27 October 2016	(Honduras) César Zelaya	(Honduras) Real Sociedad	TBD	
27 October 2016	(Honduras) Johnny Bernárdez	(Honduras) Real Sociedad	TBD	
27 October 2016	(Honduras) Francisco López	(Honduras) Real Sociedad	TBD	

=== Winter transfers ===
Date	Name	Moving from	Moving to	Ref.
4 December 2016	(Honduras) Noel Valladares	(Honduras) Olimpia	Retired	
13 December 2016	(Honduras) Víctor Moncada	Honduras Progreso	(Honduras) Real España	
13 December 2016	(Honduras) Ángel Tejeda	Honduras Progreso	(Honduras) Real España	
14 December 2016	(Honduras) David Meza	(Honduras) Olimpia	TBD	
18 December 2016	(Honduras) Júnior Izaguirre	(Honduras) Motagua	Retired	
18 December 2016	(Colombia) John Sánchez	(Honduras) Olimpia	TBD	
21 December 2016	(Colombia) Yuberny Franco	(Honduras) Platense	TBD	
21 December 2016	(Honduras) Néstor Martínez	(Honduras) Platense	TBD	
21 December 2016	(Honduras) Ábner Méndez	(Honduras) Platense	TBD	
21 December 2016	(Honduras) Sandro Cárcamo	(Honduras) Platense	Honduras Progreso	
21 December 2016	(Argentina) Domingo Zalazar	(Honduras) Real España	(Mexico) Atlante	
21 December 2016	(Honduras) Emil Martínez	(Honduras) Marathón	Retired	
21 December 2016	(Honduras) Mauricio Sabillón	(Honduras) Marathón	Retired	
22 December 2016	(Honduras) Brayan Velásquez	(Honduras) Vida	(Honduras) Olimpia	
23 December 2016	(Honduras) Romell Quioto	(Honduras) Olimpia	(United States) Houston Dynamo	
26 December 2016	(Honduras) Roger Rojas	(Mexico) Cimarrones	(Honduras) Olimpia	
27 December 2016	(Honduras) Osman Chávez	(Honduras) Real España	TBD	
27 December 2016	(Honduras) Bryan Róchez	(Honduras) Real España	TBD	
27 December 2016	(Colombia) Jhovany Mina	(Honduras) Real España	TBD	
30 December 2016	(Honduras) Aldo Oviedo	(Honduras) Juticalpa	(Honduras) Olancho	
30 December 2016	(Brazil) Caue Fernández	(Uruguay) El Tanque Sisley	(Honduras) Marathón	
2 January 2017	(Colombia) Diego Ambuila	(Bolivia) Always Ready	(Honduras) Juticalpa	
3 January 2017	(Colombia) Eder Munive	(Honduras) Marathón	TBD	
3 January 2017	(Brazil) Israel Silva	(Honduras) Marathón	TBD	
3 January 2017	(Honduras) Ian Osorio	(Honduras) Marathón	TBD	
3 January 2017	(Colombia) Charles Córdoba	(Honduras) Marathón	(Honduras) Juticalpa	
4 January 2017	(Honduras) Donaldo Morales	(Honduras) Social Sol	(Honduras) Platense	
4 January 2017	(Honduras) Franklin Morales	(United States) New York Red Bulls	(Honduras) Platense	
4 January 2017	(Argentina) Emiliano Forgione	(Italy) Sambenedettese	(Honduras) Platense	
5 January 2017	(Honduras) Diego Reyes	(Honduras) Marathón	TBD	
5 January 2017	(Honduras) Jairo Puerto	(Honduras) Marathón	TBD	
6 January 2017	(Honduras) Erick Peña	(Honduras) Juticalpa	(Honduras) Olancho	
6 January 2017	(Honduras) Óliver Morazán	(Honduras) Olimpia	(Honduras) Juticalpa	
6 January 2017	(Honduras) Joshua Nieto	(Honduras) Motagua	(Honduras) Platense	
6 January 2017	(Honduras) Arnold Meléndez	(Honduras) Motagua	TBD	
10 January 2017	(Argentina) Maximiliano Osurak	(Argentina) San Jorge	(Honduras) Platense	
11 January 2017	(Colombia) Justin Arboleda	(Panama) Chorrillo	(Honduras) Marathón	
13 January 2017	(Honduras) Henry Martínez	(Honduras) Real Sociedad	Honduras Progreso	
13 January 2017	(Belize) Deon McCaulay	(Belize) Verdes	Honduras Progreso	
13 January 2017	(Honduras) Hilder Colón	(Honduras) Real Sociedad	(Honduras) Juticalpa	

=== Liga Nacional ===
==== Apertura ====
Playoffs
3	Real España	3	2	5
6	Real Sociedad	2	1	3
4	Motagua	2	1	3
5	Marathón	1	2	3

Semifinals
2	Platense	1	1	2
3	Real España	1	1	2
1	Olimpia	0	1	1
4	Motagua	1	1	2

Finals
2	Platense	0	1	1
4	Motagua	1	1	2

==== Clausura ====
Playoffs
3	Real España	1	4	5
6	Real Sociedad	2	1	3
4	Honduras Progreso	0	1	1
5	Marathón	1	0	1

Semifinals
2	Motagua	2	2	4
3	Real España	1	2	3
1	Olimpia	2	2	4
4	Honduras Progreso	4	2	6

Finals
2	Motagua	4	3	7
4	Honduras Progreso	1	0	1

=== CONCACAF Champions League ===
Pos	Team	Pld	W	D	L	GF	GA	GD	Pts	Qualification	UNA	HON	WCO
1	(Mexico) UNAM	4	3	0	1	15	5	+10	9	Quarter-finals	—	2−0	8−1
2	Honduras Progreso	4	2	1	1	4	4	0	7		2–1	—	1–0
3	(Trinidad and Tobago) W Connection	4	0	1	3	4	14	−10	1		2–4	1–1	—

Source: CONCACAF

Pos	Team	Pld	W	D	L	GF	GA	GD	Pts	Qualification	PAC	OLI	POL
1	(Mexico) Pachuca	4	3	1	0	19	4	+15	10	Quarter-finals	—	1–0	3–0
2	(Honduras) Olimpia	4	2	1	1	13	6	+7	7		4–4	—	4–0
3	(Belize) Police United	4	0	0	4	1	23	−22	0		0–11	1–5	—

Source: CONCACAF

=== Other matches ===
2 July 2016 Friendly	San Lorenzo	0–5	Motagua	San Lorenzo, Valle
15:30 CST			35' Castillo; 39' Vergara; 55' Andino; 65' Discua; 71' Reyna	Stadium: Estadio Ángel Augusto Martínez

2 July 2016 Friendly	Real España	0–1	Honduras Progreso	San Pedro Sula, Cortés
CST			67' Alvarado	Stadium: Real España's training ground

3 July 2016 Friendly	Juticalpa	1–1	Olimpia	Juticalpa, Olancho
CST	Murillo 85'		20' Méndez	Stadium: Estadio Juan Ramón Brevé Vargas

9 July 2016 Friendly	Real España	1–1	Lepaera	San Pedro Sula, Cortés
15:30 CST	Cardozo 6'		41' (pen.) Arriola	Stadium: Real España's training ground

9 July 2016 Friendly	Honduras Progreso	2–2	Motagua	El Progreso, Yoro
15:00 CST			Figueroa; Castillo	Stadium: Open field

9 July 2016 Friendly	Marathón	2–1	Olimpia	San Pedro Sula, Cortés
19:00 CST	Puerto 37'; Rodríguez 61'		72' Pineda	Stadium: Estadio Francisco Morazán

13 July 2016 Friendly	Motagua (Honduras)	0–3	(Argentina) River Plate	Bay Lake, United States
19:00 EST			34' Andrade; 84' Mora; 88' Martínez	Stadium: ESPN Wide World of Sports Complex; Referee: Esteban Rosano (USA)

16 July 2016 Friendly	Lepaera	1–3	Olimpia	Lepaera, Lempira
CST	Sandoval		16' Bengoché; 50' Estupiñán; 90+1' Costly	Referee: Adonis Membreño

16 July 2016 Friendly	Juticalpa (Honduras)	1–0	(Nicaragua) Walter Ferretti	Juticalpa, Olancho
CST	Parham			Stadium: Estadio Juan Ramón Brevé Vargas

17 July 2016 Friendly	Alianza (El Salvador)	2–1	(Honduras) Real España	San Salvador, El Salvador
CST	Guerrero 31'; Silva 68'		24' Cardozo	Stadium: Estadio Cuscatlán

17 July 2016 Friendly	Lepaera	1–3	Olimpia	Gracias, Lempira
CST				Stadium: Estadio Juan A. Hernández

17 July 2016 Friendly	Real Sociedad	0–1	Social Sol	Tocoa, Colón
CST			46' Munguía	Stadium: Estadio Francisco Martínez Durón

23 July 2016 Friendly	Marathón	3–0	Parrillas One	San Pedro Sula, Cortés
CST	Tejeda (o.g.); Córdoba; Suazo			Stadium: Estadio Yankel Rosenthal

23 July 2016 Friendly	Motagua	0–2	Atlético Independiente	Amarateca, Francisco Morazán
17:00 CST				Stadium: Complejo Pedro Atala Simón

24 July 2016 Friendly	Talleres de Potrerillos	1–5	Olimpia	Potrerillos, Cortés
CST	Gómez 34'		Santos; Bengoché; Pineda; Rodas	Stadium: Estadio Juan Alberto Melgar Castro

24 July 2016 Friendly	Municipal Limeño (El Salvador)	3–3	(Honduras) Real Sociedad	Santa Rosa de Lima, El Salvador
CST	Toscanini 22' (pen.) 40'; López 88'		12' (pen.) 37' Martínez; 42' Arzú	Stadium: Estadio Jose Ramon Flores

26 March 2017 Friendly	El Salvador	1–0	(Honduras) Olimpia	Houston, United States
16:00 CST	Burgos 26'			Stadium: BBVA Compass Stadium

5 May 2017 Friendly	Olimpia	5–0	Gimnástico	Tegucigalpa, Francisco Morazán
CST				Stadium: Estadio Tiburcio Carías Andino

6 May 2017 Friendly	Motagua	4–0	Gimnástico	Tegucigalpa, Francisco Morazán
15:00 CST	Andino; Pucheta			Stadium: Estadio Tiburcio Carías Andino; Attendance: Closed gates

== Deaths ==
Date	Name	Born	Notes
18 July 2016	(Honduras) Denis Hainds	–	Former C.D.S. Vida footballer
6 August 2016	(Honduras) Dennis Allen	1954 (aged 62)	Former footballer and manager. Hit by car.
3 September 2016	(Honduras) Sergio Mejía	14 July 1997 (aged 19)	Former footballer. Murdered.
19 September 2016	(Honduras) Guadalupe Sarmiento	December 1915 (aged 100)	Real C.D. España's first president and founder. Natural causes.
11 October 2016	(Honduras) Salvador Hernández	–	Nicknamed Vayoy, C.D.S. Vida player in the 1960s
14 October 2016	(Honduras) Danilo Suazo	–	C.D. Victoria Board of Directors' member. Gunfire
23 October 2016	(Honduras) Marvin Paz	–	Former F.C. Motagua player. Murdered by shotguns
28 October 2016	(Honduras) Manrique Amador	(aged 38)	Football agent. Murdered by shotguns
9 December 2016	(Honduras) José López	(aged 18)	Club Deportivo Olimpia reserves footballer. Vehicle accident
25 March 2017	(Honduras) José Fuentes	–	Former referee. Murdered
19 May 2017	(Honduras) Héctor Montoya	–	Club Deportivo Olimpia and Atlético Indio former player. Respiratory arrest
