= 2017–18 Honduran Liga Nacional de Ascenso =

Liga de Ascenso
- Season: 2017–18
- Dates: 19 August 2017–2 June 2018
- Champions: Apertura: Infop RNP; Clausura: Infop RNP
- Promoted: Infop RNP
- Relegated: Valle
- All statistics correct as of 2 June 2018.

The 2017–18 Honduran Liga Nacional de Ascenso was the 51st season of the Second level in Honduran football and the 16th under the name Liga Nacional de Ascenso. The tournament was divided into two halves (Apertura and Clausura), each crowning one champion. As winners of both tournaments, Infop RNP was promoted to 2018–19 Honduran Liga Nacional.

== Apertura ==
The Apertura tournament ran from 19 August to 30 December 2017. Infop RNP obtained the title after defeating Villanueva F.C. with a 2–1 aggregate score in the final series.

=== Regular season ===
==== Standings ====
Group A
Pos	Team	Pld	W	D	L	GF	GA	GD	Pts	Qualification
1	Social Sol	14	8	3	3	20	13	+7	27	Qualification to the Quarterfinals
2	Yoro	14	7	2	5	19	16	+3	23	Qualification to the Play-offs
3	Tela	13	6	3	4	24	17	+7	21	Qualification to the Play-offs
4	Boca Juniors	14	6	3	5	23	19	+4	21	
5	Arsenal	14	4	5	5	16	14	+2	17	
6	Borussia	14	5	2	7	21	25	−4	17	
7	Victoria	14	5	1	8	12	21	−9	16	
8	Trujillo	13	3	3	7	13	23	−10	12	

Group B
Pos	Team	Pld	W	D	L	GF	GA	GD	Pts	Qualification
1	Lepaera	10	6	2	2	17	9	+8	20	Qualification to the Quarterfinals
2	Deportes Savio	10	5	4	1	20	9	+11	19	Qualification to the Play-offs
3	Pinares	10	5	1	4	14	12	+2	16	Qualification to the Play-offs
4	Real Juventud	10	2	5	3	9	12	−3	11	
5	Olimpia Occidental	10	3	2	5	11	16	−5	11	
6	Atlético Esperanzano	10	1	2	7	7	20	−13	5	

Group C
Pos	Team	Pld	W	D	L	GF	GA	GD	Pts	Qualification
1	Villanueva	14	7	4	3	21	14	+7	25	Qualification to the Quarterfinals
2	Parrillas One	14	7	3	4	15	8	+7	24	Qualification to the Play-offs
3	Comayagua	14	6	4	4	25	20	+5	22	Qualification to the Play-offs
4	Atlético Choloma	14	7	1	6	15	18	−3	22	
5	Atlético Limeño	14	5	6	3	23	18	+5	21	
6	París	14	5	3	6	18	20	−2	18	
7	Atlético Municipal	14	4	1	9	14	24	−10	13	
8	Brasilia	14	2	4	8	11	20	−9	10	

Group D
Pos	Team	Pld	W	D	L	GF	GA	GD	Pts	Qualification
1	Infop RNP	12	8	0	4	16	9	+7	24	Qualification to the Quarterfinals
2	Olancho	12	6	3	3	22	14	+8	21	Qualification to the Play-offs
3	Broncos del Sur	12	4	3	5	14	15	−1	15	Qualification to the Play-offs
4	Valle	12	2	8	2	19	17	+2	14	
5	Gimnástico	12	3	5	4	15	17	−2	14	
6	Estrella Roja	12	2	6	4	19	19	0	12	
7	Municipal Valencia	12	2	5	5	14	28	−14	11	

=== Postseason ===
==== Play-offs ====
9 November 2017	Comayagua	1–1	Olancho	Comayagua
				Stadium: Estadio Carlos Miranda

12 November 2017	Olancho	0–1 (1–2 agg.)	Comayagua	Catacamas
				Stadium: Estadio Rubén Guifarro

9 November 2017	Broncos del Sur	2–0	Parrillas One	Choluteca
19:00				Stadium: Estadio Emilio Williams Agasse

12 November 2017	Parrillas One	4–0 (4–2 agg.)	Broncos del Sur	Tela
				Stadium: Estadio León Gómez

12 November 2017	Tela	1–0	Deportes Savio	Tela
				Stadium: Estadio León Gómez

15 November 2017	Deportes Savio	5–1 (5–2 agg.)	Tela	Santa Rosa de Copán
				Stadium: Estadio Sergio Antonio Reyes

12 November 2017	Pinares	0–0	Yoro	Choluteca
				Stadium: Estadio Fausto Flores Lagos

15 November 2017	Yoro	3–1 (3–1 agg.)	Pinares	Yoro
				Stadium: Estadio Olímpico Yoreño

==== Quarterfinals ====
18 November 2017	Comayagua	4–2	Social Sol	Comayagua
				Stadium: Estadio Carlos Miranda

23 November 2017	Social Sol	3–1 (5–5 agg.) (6–5 p)	Comayagua	Olanchito
19:00				Stadium: Estadio San Jorge

19 November 2017	Parrillas One	2–1	Lepaera	Tela
15:00				Stadium: Estadio León Gómez

23 November 2017	Lepaera	0–1 (1–3 agg.)	Parrillas One	Lepaera
19:00				Stadium: Estadio Juan Orlando Hernández

19 November 2017	Deportes Savio	0–1	Villanueva	Santa Rosa de Copán
15:00			9' Durón	Stadium: Estadio Sergio Antonio Reyes

24 November 2017	Villanueva	2–2 (a.e.t.) (3–2 agg.)	Deportes Savio	Villanueva
18:30				Stadium: Estadio José Adrián Cruz

19 November 2017	Yoro	2–2	Infop RNP	Yoro
14:00				Stadium: Estadio Olímpico Yoreño

24 November 2017	Infop RNP	5–3 (7–5 agg.)	Yoro	Tegucigalpa
19:00				Stadium: Estadio Birichiche

==== Semifinals ====
13 December 2017	Infop RNP	1–0	Social Sol	Tegucigalpa
20:00	Discua 85'			Stadium: Estadio Birichiche

16 December 2017	Social Sol	1–0 (1–1 agg.) (1–4 p)	Infop RNP	Olanchito
19:00				Stadium: Estadio San Jorge

6 December 2017	Parrillas One	0–1	Villanueva	San Pedro Sula
15:00			85' Chávez	Stadium: Estadio Yankel Rosenthal

10 December 2017	Villanueva	3–2 (4–2 agg.)	Parrillas One	Villanueva
15:30	Velásquez 5'; Chávez 38'; Durón 60'		41' Girón; 49' Parham	Stadium: Estadio José Adrián Cruz

==== Final ====
28 December 2017	Villanueva	1–0	Infop RNP	Villanueva
18:00	Acosta 87' (o.g.)			Stadium: Estadio José Adrián Cruz

30 December 2017	Infop RNP	2–0 (2–1 agg.)	Villanueva	Tegucigalpa
20:15	Discua 8'; Ávila			Stadium: Estadio Birichiche

== Clausura ==
The Clausura tournament was played in the first half of 2018.

=== Postseason ===
==== Play-offs ====
18 April 2018	Arsenal	2–0	Deportes Savio	Coxen Hole
15:00				Stadium: Coxen Hole Stadium

22 April 2018	Deportes Savio	2–0 (2–2 agg.) (3–0 p)	Arsenal	Santa Rosa de Copán
15:00				Stadium: Estadio Sergio Antonio Reyes

18 April 2018	Atlético Municipal	3–2	Estrella Roja	Santa Cruz de Yojoa
15:30				Stadium: Estadio Álex Pineda Chacón

22 April 2018	Estrella Roja	2–0 (4–3 agg.)	Atlético Municipal	Danlí
14:30				Stadium: Estadio Marcelo Tinoco

18 April 2018	Gimnástico	2–3	Villanueva	Tegucigalpa
18:00				Stadium: Estadio Emilio Larach

22 April 2018	Villanueva	1–1 (4–3 agg.)	Gimnástico	Villanueva
17:00				Stadium: Estadio José Adrián Cruz

18 April 2018	Lepaera	1–0	Dortmund	Lepaera
19:00				Stadium: Estadio Juan Orlando Hernández

22 April 2018	Dortmund	1–1 (1–2 agg.)	Lepaera	Roatán
14:30

==== Quarterfinals ====
27 April 2018	Villanueva	0–0	Pinares	Villanueva
18:30				Stadium: Estadio José Adrián Cruz

5 May 2018	Pinares	0–0 (0–0 agg.) (4–5 p)	Villanueva	Ocotepeque
15:00				Stadium: Estadio John F. Kennedy

28 April 2018	Lepaera	2–1	Infop RNP	Lepaera
15:30	Arriola 43' (pen.); Barrios 67'		86' Discua	Stadium: Estadio Juan Orlando Hernández

4 May 2018	Infop RNP	3–0 (4–2 agg.)	Lepaera	Tegucigalpa
19:00				Stadium: Estadio Birichiche

29 April 2018	Deportes Savio	2–0	Parrillas One	Santa Rosa de Copán
15:00	Chávez 45'; Ramírez			Stadium: Estadio Sergio Antonio Reyes

5 May 2018	Parrillas One	4–1 (a.e.t.) (4–3 agg.)	Deportes Savio	San Pedro Sula
19:00	Hoyos 37'; Díaz 81'; Girón 90+'; Castro 100'		28' Cantillano	Stadium: Estadio General Francisco Morazán

29 April 2018	Estrella Roja	1–1	Yoro	Danlí
15:00	Corrales		Mancía	Stadium: Estadio Marcelo Tinoco

6 May 2018	Yoro	2–2 (3–3 agg.)	Estrella Roja	Yoro
14:00				Stadium: Estadio Olímpico Yoreño

- Note: Yoro and Estrella Roja finished with a 3–3 aggregated score. Estrella Roja was disqualified for abandoning the second leg by not accepting a late penalty at the 89th minute.

==== Semifinals ====
12 May 2018	Villanueva	4–1	Parrillas One	Villanueva
18:00				Stadium: Estadio José Adrián Cruz

20 May 2018	Parrillas One	2–2 (3–6 agg.)	Villanueva	San Pedro Sula
15:00	Díaz 67'; Morales		44' Álvarez; 58' Chávez	Stadium: Estadio General Francisco Morazán

13 May 2018	Yoro	2–0	Infop RNP	Yoro
14:00				Stadium: Estadio Olímpico Yoreño

18 May 2018	Infop RNP	3–0 (3–2 agg.)	Yoro	Tegucigalpa
20:00				Stadium: Estadio Birichiche

==== Final ====
26 May 2018	Villanueva	0–2	Infop RNP	Villanueva
17:00	Velásquez (penalty missed)		15' Calderón; 84' Torres	Stadium: Estadio José Adrián Cruz

2 June 2018	Infop RNP	2–2 (4–2 agg.)	Villanueva	Tegucigalpa
20:00	Moncada 42' (pen.); Calderón 90+3'		51' (pen.) Andino; 63' Chávez	Stadium: Estadio Birichiche; Referee: Melissa Borjas

== Promotion ==
As winners of both Apertura and Clausura, Infop RNP was automatically promoted to 2018–19 Honduran Liga Nacional and no promotion play off was required.
