= 2016–17 Honduran Liga Nacional de Ascenso =

Liga de Ascenso
- Season: 2016–17
- Champions: Apertura: Lepaera; Clausura: UPNFM
- Promoted: UPNFM
- Relegated: CARDVA

The 2016–17 Honduran Liga Nacional de Ascenso is the 38th edition of the second level tournament in Honduran football and the 15th since its re-branding as Liga de Ascenso. As the previous season, the tournament will be divided into two phases named Apertura (fall) and Clausura (spring), the winners of each phase will fight for the promotion to the 2017–18 Honduran Liga Nacional.

== 2016–17 teams ==
For the first time, there will be 32 teams divided into 4 groups of eight.

Group A

- Victoria (Relegated from 2015–16 Honduran Liga Nacional)
- Arsenal
- Yoro
- Trujillo
- Tela F.C.
- Boca Júnior
- CARDVA
- Discua Nicolás (Promoted from 2015–16 Honduran Liga Mayor)

Group B

- Deportes Savio
- Real Juventud
- Olimpia Occidental
- Lepaera
- Atlético Esperanzano
- Atlético Pinares

Group C

- Parrillas One
- Atlético Choloma
- Atlético Municipal
- Atlético Independiente
- Villanueva
- Comayagua
- Atlético Limeño
- Brasilia

Group D

- Lobos UPNFM
- Olancho
- Valle
- Municipal Valencia
- Gimnástico
- Estrella Roja (Promoted from 2015–16 Honduran Liga Mayor)

== Apertura ==
The Apertura tournament will run from 19 August to December 2016.

Group A
| Pos | Team | Pld | W | D | L | GF | GA | GD | Pts |
|---|---|---|---|---|---|---|---|---|---|
| 1 | Victoria | 12 | 8 | 2 | 2 | 26 | 8 | +18 | 26 |
| 2 | Yoro | 12 | 6 | 3 | 3 | 21 | 13 | +8 | 21 |
| 3 | Tela | 12 | 6 | 2 | 4 | 27 | 17 | +10 | 20 |
| 4 | Discua Nicolás | 12 | 5 | 5 | 2 | 15 | 13 | +2 | 20 |
| 5 | Arsenal | 12 | 4 | 4 | 4 | 14 | 16 | −2 | 16 |
| 6 | Boca Júnior | 12 | 3 | 4 | 5 | 9 | 17 | −8 | 13 |
| 7 | CARDVA | 12 | 2 | 2 | 8 | 10 | 23 | −13 | 8 |
| 8 | Trujillo | 12 | 1 | 4 | 7 | 3 | 17 | −14 | 7 |

Group B
| Pos | Team | Pld | W | D | L | GF | GA | GD | Pts |
|---|---|---|---|---|---|---|---|---|---|
| 1 | Lepaera | 10 | 5 | 4 | 1 | 25 | 13 | +12 | 19 |
| 2 | Real Juventud | 10 | 4 | 3 | 3 | 16 | 12 | +4 | 15 |
| 3 | Atlético Esperanzano | 10 | 4 | 3 | 3 | 14 | 17 | −3 | 15 |
| 4 | Atlético Pinares | 10 | 4 | 1 | 5 | 18 | 16 | +2 | 13 |
| 5 | Deportes Savio | 10 | 2 | 5 | 3 | 13 | 13 | 0 | 11 |
| 6 | Olimpia Occidental | 10 | 2 | 2 | 6 | 12 | 24 | −12 | 8 |

Group C
| Pos | Team | Pld | W | D | L | GF | GA | GD | Pts |
|---|---|---|---|---|---|---|---|---|---|
| 1 | Atlético Limeño | 12 | 7 | 2 | 3 | 28 | 24 | +4 | 23 |
| 2 | Villanueva | 12 | 7 | 1 | 4 | 20 | 10 | +10 | 22 |
| 3 | Parrillas One | 12 | 5 | 5 | 2 | 18 | 10 | +8 | 20 |
| 4 | Atlético Municipal | 12 | 6 | 1 | 5 | 18 | 18 | 0 | 19 |
| 5 | Atlético Choloma | 12 | 4 | 2 | 6 | 10 | 15 | −5 | 14 |
| 6 | Comayagua | 12 | 4 | 1 | 7 | 15 | 20 | −5 | 13 |
| 7 | Brasilia | 11 | 3 | 3 | 5 | 19 | 22 | −3 | 12 |
| 8 | Atlético Independiente | 12 | 2 | 3 | 7 | 10 | 20 | −10 | 9 |

Group D
| Pos | Team | Pld | W | D | L | GF | GA | GD | Pts |
|---|---|---|---|---|---|---|---|---|---|
| 1 | Gimnástico | 10 | 4 | 5 | 1 | 16 | 12 | +4 | 17 |
| 2 | UPNFM | 8 | 4 | 4 | 0 | 26 | 13 | +13 | 16 |
| 3 | Olancho | 8 | 3 | 3 | 2 | 14 | 10 | +4 | 12 |
| 4 | Municipal Valencia | 9 | 2 | 4 | 3 | 14 | 17 | −3 | 10 |
| 5 | Valle | 7 | 1 | 3 | 3 | 6 | 13 | −7 | 6 |
| 6 | Estrella Roja | 8 | 1 | 1 | 6 | 10 | 20 | −10 | 4 |
| – | Atlético Olanchano (D) | 0 | 0 | 0 | 0 | 0 | 0 | 0 | 0 |

(D) Disaffiliated

=== Final ===
| 23 December 2016 Final | Lepaera | 2–1 | Yoro | San Pedro Sula, Cortés |
| 15:00 CST | Almendárez 36'; Bustos 67' | | 75' Barahona | Stadium: Estadio Francisco Morazán |

== Clausura ==
The Clausura tournament will run from January to May 2017.

=== Playoffs ===
| 26 April 2017 | Villanueva | 1–0 | Valle |
| CST |

| 26 April 2017 | Pinares | 2–0 | Victoria |
| CST |

| 26 April 2017 | UPNFM | 2–1 | Atlético Choloma |
| CST |

| 26 April 2017 | Tela | 2–1 | Lepaera |
| CST | Zelaya 39'; Grant 89' | | 36' Williams |

=== Quarterfinals ===
| May 2017 1st leg | UPNFM | 1–0 | Deportes Savio | Tegucigalpa |
| CST |

| 13 May 2017 2nd leg | Deportes Savio | 0–0 | UPNFM | Santa Rosa de Copán |
| CST | | | | Stadium: Estadio Sergio Antonio Reyes |

- UPNFM won 1–0 on aggregated.

| May 2017 1st leg | Atlético Pinares | 0–0 | Olancho | Ocotepeque |
| CST | | | | Stadium: Estadio John F. Kennedy |

| 13 May 2017 2nd leg | Olancho | 3–1 | Atlético Pinares | Juticalpa |
| CST | Gómez; Solórzano; Fernández | | 87' Solórzano | Stadium: Estadio Ramón Sarmiento |

- Olancho won 3–1 on aggregated.

| May 2017 1st leg | Lepaera | 2–0 | Parrillas One | Lepaera |
| CST |

| 12 May 2017 2nd leg | Parrillas One | 1–1 | Lepaera | San Pedro Sula |
| CST | | | | Attendance: Closed gates |

- Lepaera won 3–1 on aggregated.

| May 2017 1st leg | Villanueva | 5–1 | Arsenal | Villanueva |
| CST |

| 14 May 2017 2nd leg | Arsenal | 2–2 | Villanueva | Roatán |
| CST | | | | Stadium: Coxen Hole Stadium |

- Villanueva won 7–3 on aggregated.

=== Semifinals ===
| 19 May 2017 1st leg | UPNFM | 2–1 | Lepaera | Tegucigalpa |
| 11:00 CST | Rodríguez; Meléndez | | Maradiaga |

| 27 May 2017 2nd leg | Lepaera | 1–0 | UPNFM | Lepaera |
| 19:00 CST | Arzú 40' |

- Lepaera 2–2 UPNFM on aggregated. UPNFM won 4–1 on penalty shoot-outs.

| 20 May 2017 1st leg | Villanueva | 2–1 | Olancho | Villanueva |
| CST | | | | Stadium: Estadio José Adrián Cruz |

| 27 May 2017 2nd leg | Olancho | 0–0 | Villanueva | Juticalpa |
| 15:30 CST | | | | Stadium: Estadio Ramón Sarmiento |

- Villanueva won 2–1 on aggregated.

=== Final ===
| 4 June 2017 Final | UPNFM | 0–0 (a.e.t.) (3–1 p) | Villanueva | Comayagua |
| 15:00 CST | | | | Stadium: Estadio Carlos Miranda; Attendance: ~1,800; Referee: Nelson Mejía |
| | Penalties |
| | Yanes (penalty missed); Padilla (penalty scored); Montoya (penalty scored); Salinas (penalty scored) | | (penalty missed) Ramírez; (penalty scored) Velásquez; (penalty missed) Orellana; (penalty missed) Ochoa |

== Promotion ==
The winners of both Apertura and Clausura tournaments will face to decide the team to be promoted to 2017–18 Honduran Liga Nacional. In case the same team wins both phases, it will obtain automatic promotion. Lepaera F.C. and Lobos UPNFM as Apertura and Clausura winners respectively will fight for promotion.

| 11 June 2017 | Lepaera | 0–1 | UPNFM | San Pedro Sula |
| 15:00 CST | | | 65' Meléndez | Stadium: Estadio Francisco Morazán; Referee: Saíd Martínez |
