= 2017–18 in Honduran football =

Football in Honduras
- Season: 2017–18

Men's football
- Liga Nacional: Apertura: Real España; Clausura: Marathón
- Liga de Ascenso: Apertura: Infop RNP; Clausura: Infop RNP
- Honduran Supercup: Motagua

The 2017–18 season is the 70th season of competitive association football in Honduras.

== National teams ==
=== Senior team ===
==== FIFA World Cup qualification ====
Pos	Team	Pld	W	D	L	GF	GA	GD	Pts	Qualification	(Mexico)	(Costa Rica)	(Panama)	(Honduras)	(United States)	(Trinidad and Tobago)
1	Mexico	10	6	3	1	16	7	+9	21	Qualification to 2018 FIFA World Cup	—	2–0	1–0	3–0	1–1	3–1
2	Costa Rica	10	4	4	2	14	8	+6	16	Qualification to 2018 FIFA World Cup	1–1	—	0–0	1–1	4–0	2–1
3	Panama	10	3	4	3	9	10	−1	13	Qualification to 2018 FIFA World Cup	0–0	2–1	—	2–2	1–1	3–0
4	Honduras	10	3	4	3	13	19	−6	13	Advance to inter-confederation play-offs	3–2	1–1	0–1	—	1–1	3–1
5	United States	10	3	3	4	17	13	+4	12		1–2	0–2	4–0	6–0	—	2–0
6	Trinidad and Tobago	10	2	0	8	7	19	−12	6		0–1	0–2	1–0	1–2	2–1	—

Source: FIFA
Rules for classification: Qualification tiebreakers
10 November 2017
16:00 UTC−6
First leg

Honduras	0–0	Australia
	Report

Estadio Olímpico Metropolitano, San Pedro Sula
Attendance: 38,000
Referee: Daniele Orsato (Italy)
15 November 2017
20:00 UTC+11
Second leg

Australia	3–1	Honduras
Jedinak 54', 72' (pen.), 85' (pen.)	Report	Elis 90+3'

Stadium Australia, Sydney
Attendance: 77,060
Referee: Néstor Pitana (Argentina)

==== CONCACAF Gold Cup ====
Pos	Team	Pld	W	D	L	GF	GA	GD	Pts	Qualification
1	Costa Rica	3	2	1	0	5	1	+4	7	Advance to knockout stage
2	Canada	3	1	2	0	5	3	+2	5	Advance to knockout stage
3	Honduras	3	1	1	1	3	1	+2	4	Advance to knockout stage
4	French Guiana	3	0	0	3	2	10	−8	0	

Source: CONCACAF
Rules for classification: Group stage tiebreakers

Quarter-finals
July 19 – Philadelphia
Costa Rica	1
Panama	0
July 19 – Philadelphia
United States	2
El Salvador	0
July 20 – Glendale
Mexico	1
Honduras	0
July 20 – Glendale
Jamaica	2
Canada	1

Semi-finals
July 22 – Arlington
Costa Rica	0
United States	2
July 23 – Pasadena
Mexico	0
Jamaica	1

Final
July 26 – Santa Clara
United States	2
Jamaica	1

=== Olympic team ===
==== Central American Games ====
Pos	Team	Pld	W	D	L	GF	GA	GD	Pts	Qualification
1	Honduras	2	1	1	0	5	0	+5	4	Semi-finals
2	Nicaragua	2	0	2	0	1	1	0	2	Semi-finals
3	Belize	2	0	1	1	1	6	−5	1	

First match(es) will be played: 7 December 2017. Source:
Rules for classification: Group stage tiebreakers

Semifinals
11 December 2017
Costa Rica	1
Nicaragua	0
11 December 2017
Honduras	1 (2)
El Salvador	1 (1)

Final
13 December 2017
Costa Rica	0
Honduras	1

==== Other matches ====
TBA

=== U-17 team ===
==== FIFA U-17 World Cup ====
Pos	Team	Pld	W	D	L	GF	GA	GD	Pts	Qualification
1	France	3	3	0	0	14	3	+11	9	Knockout stage
2	Japan	3	1	1	1	8	4	+4	4	Knockout stage
3	Honduras	3	1	0	2	7	11	−4	3	Knockout stage
4	New Caledonia	3	0	1	2	2	13	−11	1	

Source: FIFA
Rules for classification: Group stage tiebreakers

Round of 16
16 October – New Delhi
Colombia	0
Germany	4
18 October – Kochi
Brazil	3
Honduras	0
16 October – New Delhi
Paraguay	0
United States	5
17 October – Kolkata
England (p)	0 (5)
Japan	0 (3)
17 October – Margao
Mali	5
Iraq	1
18 October – Navi Mumbai
Ghana	2
Niger	0
17 October – Guwahati
France	1
Spain	2
17 October – Margao
Iran	2
Mexico	1

Quarter-finals
22 October – Kolkata
Germany	1
Brazil	2
21 October – Margao
United States	1
England	4
21 October – Guwahati
Mali	2
Ghana	1
22 October – Kochi
Spain	3
Iran	1

Semi-finals
25 October – Kolkata
Brazil	1
England	3
25 October – Navi Mumbai
Mali	1
Spain	3

Final
28 October – Kolkata
England	5
Spain	2
Third place play-off
28 October – Kolkata
Brazil	2
Mali	0

==== Other matches ====
23 August 2017 Friendly	Honduras	2–1	Costa Rica	Comayagua, Honduras
Evening CST	Palma 4'; Palacios	Report	Cordero	Stadium: Estadio Carlos Miranda

24 September 2017 Friendly	Hércules (Spain)	1–3	Honduras	Alicante, Spain
CET			Palacios; Palma

September 2017 Friendly	Valencia (Spain)	1–1	Honduras	Spain
CET

29 September 2017 Friendly	Spain	8–0	Honduras	Alcoy, Spain
18:30 CET	Ruiz 16' 81' 86'; García 4'; Lara; Chust; Gómez 78'; Nacho 67'			Stadium: Estadio El Collao

=== U-16 team ===
==== 2017 UNCAF U-16 Tournament ====
Pos	Team	Pld	W	D	L	GF	GA	GD	Pts	Result
1	Costa Rica	4	3	0	1	8	4	+4	9	2017 UNCAF U-16 Tournament winners
2	Panama	4	1	3	0	4	1	+3	6	
3	El Salvador	4	1	2	1	3	2	+1	5	
4	Honduras	4	1	2	1	2	3	−1	5	
5	Nicaragua	4	0	1	3	2	9	−7	1	

== Domestic clubs ==
=== Promotion and relegation ===
League	Promoted to league	Relegated from league
Liga Nacional	UPNFM	Real Sociedad
Liga de Ascenso	Infop RNP	Valle

=== Summer transfers ===
Date	Name	Moving from	Moving to	Ref.
10 March 2017	(Honduras) Devron García	(United States) Orlando City B	(Honduras) Real España	
23 May 2017	(Honduras) Walter Martínez	(Honduras) Marathón	(Honduras) Motagua	
25 May 2017	(Honduras) Getsel Montes	(Honduras) Platense	(Honduras) Real España	
28 May 2017	(Argentina) Santiago Vergara	(Honduras) Motagua	Hiatus	
30 May 2017	(Argentina) Domingo Zalazar	(Mexico) Atlante	(Honduras) Real España	
1 June 2017	(Honduras) Franco Güity	(Guatemala) Universidad SC	(Honduras) Juticalpa	
1 June 2017	(Honduras) José Mendoza	(Venezuela) Estudiantes de Mérida	(Honduras) Juticalpa	
1 June 2017	(Trinidad and Tobago) Jan-Michael Williams	(Trinidad and Tobago) Central	(Honduras) Juticalpa	
8 June 2017	(Honduras) Júnior Lacayo	(Mexico) Tampico Madero	(Honduras) Marathón	
12 June 2017	(Honduras) Dabirson Castillo	(Honduras) Platense	(Honduras) Olimpia	
16 June 2017	(Guatemala) Gerson Tinoco	(Guatemala) Suchitepéquez	(Honduras) Juticalpa	
17 June 2017	(Trinidad and Tobago) Daneil Cyrus	(Trinidad and Tobago) W Connection	(Honduras) Juticalpa	
20 June 2017	(Honduras) Darixon Vuelto	(Spain) Tenerife	(Honduras) Real España	
20 June 2017	(Honduras) Horacio Parham	(Honduras) Juticalpa	TBD	
25 June 2017	(Argentina) Martín Pucheta	(Honduras) Motagua	TBD	
25 June 2017	(Argentina) Sebastián Portigliatti	(Honduras) Juticalpa	TBD	
25 June 2017	(Honduras) Rafael Zúniga	(Honduras) Juticalpa	TBD	
25 June 2017	(Honduras) Melvin Valladares	(Honduras) Juticalpa	TBD	
25 June 2017	(Honduras) Secundino Martínez	(Honduras) Juticalpa	TBD	
25 June 2017	(Honduras) Marlon Peña	(Honduras) Juticalpa	TBD	
25 June 2017	(Panama) René Campbell	(Honduras) Juticalpa	TBD	
25 June 2017	(Honduras) Shannon Welcome	(Honduras) Juticalpa	(Honduras) Real Sociedad	
25 June 2017	(Honduras) Rony Martínez	(Honduras) Real Sociedad	(China) Baoding Yingli ETS	
25 June 2017	(Honduras) José Barralaga	(Honduras) Real Sociedad	TBD	
25 June 2017	(Colombia) Luis Caraballo	(Honduras) Real Sociedad	TBD	
25 June 2017	(Colombia) Júnior Martínez	(Honduras) Real Sociedad	TBD	
25 June 2017	(Honduras) Harlington Gutiérrez	(Honduras) Real Sociedad	TBD	
25 June 2017	(Honduras) Erick Norales	(Honduras) Marathón	(Honduras) Platense	
25 June 2017	(Honduras) Denovan Torres	(Honduras) Marathón	Honduras Progreso	
25 June 2017	(Honduras) Edwin León	(Honduras) Juticalpa	Honduras Progreso	
25 June 2017	(Honduras) Marvin Chávez	(Honduras) Marathón	TBD	
25 June 2017	(Honduras) Luis Ramos	(Honduras) Marathón	TBD	
25 June 2017	(Uruguay) Santiago Barboza	(Honduras) Marathón	TBD	
25 June 2017	(Honduras) Roby Norales	(India) Ozone	(Honduras) Platense	
25 June 2017	(Honduras) Bryan Figueroa	(Honduras) Parrillas One	(Honduras) Platense	
25 June 2017	(Honduras) José Pineda	(Honduras) Platense	TBD	
25 June 2017	(Argentina) Emiliano Forgione	(Honduras) Platense	TBD	
25 June 2017	(Argentina) Maximiliano Osurak	(Honduras) Platense	TBD	
25 June 2017	(Honduras) Joshua Nieto	(Honduras) Platense	TBD	
25 June 2017	(Honduras) David Mendoza	(Honduras) Platense	Honduras Progreso	
25 June 2017	(Panama) Richard Dixon	(Honduras) Platense	(El Salvador) Águila	
25 June 2017	(Brazil) Fábio de Souza	(Honduras) Olimpia	TBD	
25 June 2017	(Argentina) Walter García	(Honduras) Olimpia	TBD	
25 June 2017	(Argentina) Kevin Hoyos	(Honduras) Vida	TBD	
25 June 2017	(Honduras) Cholby Martínez	(Honduras) Vida	(Honduras) Platense	
25 June 2017	(Honduras) Bryan Johnson	(Honduras) Olimpia	Honduras Progreso	
25 June 2017	(Honduras) Jerry Palacios	(Honduras) Vida	TBD	
25 June 2017	(Argentina) Francisco Ojeda	(Honduras) Vida	TBD	
25 June 2017	(Honduras) Kevin Maradiaga	(Honduras) Vida	TBD	
25 June 2017	(Honduras) Otoniel Osorio	(Honduras) Vida	TBD	
25 June 2017	(Honduras) Nissi Sauceda	(Honduras) Vida	TBD	
25 June 2017	(Honduras) Maycol Montero	(Honduras) Vida	TBD	
25 June 2017	(Honduras) Marlon Ramírez	(Honduras) Vida	(Honduras) Juticalpa	
25 June 2017	(Honduras) José García	(Honduras) Juticalpa	Honduras Progreso	
25 June 2017	(Honduras) Sandro Cárcamo	Honduras Progreso	TBD	
25 June 2017	(Honduras) Nixon Duarte	Honduras Progreso	(Honduras) Juticalpa	
25 June 2017	(Honduras) Darwin Bermúdez	Honduras Progreso	TBD	
25 June 2017	(Honduras) Dilmer Gutiérrez	Honduras Progreso	(Honduras) Real Sociedad	
25 June 2017	(Argentina) Luciano Ursino	(Honduras) Real España	TBD	
26 June 2017	(Honduras) Víctor Moncada	(Honduras) Real España	(Honduras) Juticalpa	
26 June 2017	(Honduras) Eddie Hernández	(Colombia) Deportes Tolima	(Honduras) Motagua	
26 June 2017	(Honduras) Deybi Flores	(Canada) Vancouver Whitecaps FC	(Honduras) Motagua	
27 June 2017	(Honduras) Jeffry Flores	(Honduras) Real España	(Honduras) Platense	
27 June 2017	(Honduras) Roberto López	(Honduras) Real España	(Honduras) Platense	
29 June 2017	(Honduras) Irvin Reyna	(Honduras) Motagua	(Honduras) UPNFM	
30 June 2017	(Honduras) Johnny Leverón	(Mexico) Correcaminos UAT	(Honduras) Marathón	
30 June 2017	(Panama) José Calderón	(Colombia) Real Cartagena	(Honduras) Marathón	
1 July 2017	(Colombia) Charles Córdoba	(Honduras) Juticalpa	TBD	
1 July 2017	(Honduras) Sergio Mendoza	(Honduras) Juticalpa	TBD	
1 July 2017	(Honduras) Bryant Castro	(Honduras) Social Sol	(Honduras) Platense	
5 July 2017	(Honduras) Robbie Matute	(Honduras) Real Sociedad	(Honduras) Juticalpa	
5 July 2017	(Honduras) Rigoberto Padilla	(Honduras) UPNFM	TBD	
6 July 2017	(Honduras) Raúl Santos	(Honduras) Vida	(Honduras) Motagua	
6 July 2017	(Honduras) Mario Martínez	(Egypt) ENPPI	(Honduras) Real España	
6 July 2017	(Honduras) Héctor Ulloa	(Honduras) Social Sol	(Honduras) Real España	
6 July 2017	(Honduras) Henry Palacios	(Honduras) Social Sol	(Honduras) Real España	
6 July 2017	(Honduras) César García	(Honduras) Social Sol	(Honduras) Real España	
7 July 2017	(Colombia) Andrés Quejada	(Colombia) Fortaleza	(Honduras) Olimpia	
7 July 2017	(Honduras) Jonathan Paz	(Honduras) Real Sociedad	(Honduras) Olimpia	
8 July 2017	(Cuba) Yaudel Lahera	–	(Honduras) Marathón	
8 July 2017	(Honduras) Maylor Núñez	(Honduras) Platense	(Honduras) Motagua	
8 July 2017	(Honduras) Henry Güity	(Honduras) Platense	(Honduras) Motagua	
8 July 2017	(Honduras) Christian Hernández	(Honduras) Motagua	TBD	
14 July 2017	(Honduras) Diego Reyes	(Greece) AEL	(Honduras) Real Sociedad	
15 July 2017	(Honduras) Luis Lobo	(Honduras) Social Sol	(Honduras) Platense	
15 July 2017	(Honduras) Allan Cárcamo	(Honduras) Social Sol	(Honduras) Real Sociedad	
18 July 2017	(Honduras) Dylan Andrade	(Honduras) Platense	Honduras Progreso	
24 July 2017	(Brazil) Matheu Pinto	–	(Honduras) Platense	
25 July 2017	(Honduras) Jonathan Tejeda	(Honduras) Olimpia	(Honduras) Marathón	
25 July 2017	(Honduras) Marcelo Canales	(Honduras) Olimpia	TBD	
25 July 2017	(Honduras) Elkin González	(Honduras) Real Sociedad	TBD	
26 July 2017	(Honduras) Elmer Güity	(Honduras) Olimpia	(Honduras) Juticalpa	
26 July 2017	(Honduras) Ismael Santos	(Honduras) Olimpia	(Honduras) UPNFM	
26 July 2017	(Honduras) Christopher Urmeneta	(Honduras) Social Sol	(Honduras) UPNFM	
26 July 2017	(Honduras) Jerrick Díaz	(Honduras) Social Sol	(Honduras) UPNFM	
27 July 2017	(Honduras) Efraín López	(Honduras) Social Sol	(Honduras) Real Sociedad	
1 August 2017	(Honduras) Bryan Acosta	(Honduras) Real España	(Spain) Tenerife	
2 August 2017	(Honduras) Mayron Flores	(Honduras) Olimpia	(Honduras) UPNFM	
2 August 2017	(Honduras) Román Valencia	(Honduras) Real España	(Honduras) UPNFM	
3 August 2017	(Honduras) Jairo Róchez	–	(Honduras) UPNFM	
3 August 2017	(Honduras) Kennett Hernández	(Honduras) Victoria	(Honduras) Vida	
3 August 2017	(Honduras) Carlos Palacios	(Honduras) Marathón	(Honduras) Vida	
3 August 2017	(Honduras) Jonathan González	(Honduras) Social Sol	(Honduras) Vida	

=== Winter transfers ===
Date	Name	Moving from	Moving to	Ref.
6 December 2017	(Honduras) Esdras Padilla	(Honduras) Juticalpa	TBD	
12 December 2017	(Uruguay) Richard Rodríguez	(Honduras) Vida	TBD	
16 December 2017	(Honduras) Efraín López	(Honduras) Real Sociedad	TBD	
16 December 2017	(Honduras) Hárlinton Gutierres	(Honduras) Real Sociedad	TBD	
16 December 2017	(Honduras) Allan Cárcamo	(Honduras) Real Sociedad	TBD	
18 December 2017	(Honduras) Erik Bernárdez	(Honduras) Juticalpa	(Honduras) Vida	
18 December 2017	(Honduras) Darwin Oliva	(Guatemala) Deportivo Sanarate	(Honduras) Vida	
20 December 2017	(Honduras) Douglas Martínez	(United States) New York Red Bulls II	(Honduras) Vida	
24 December 2017	(Honduras) Roger Rojas	(Honduras) Olimpia	(Costa Rica) Alajuelense	
24 December 2017	(Honduras) Luis Garrido	(Honduras) Olimpia	(Costa Rica) Alajuelense	
30 December 2017	(Honduras) Rony Martínez	(China) Baoding Yingli ETS	(Honduras) Olimpia	
30 December 2017	(Honduras) Diego Reyes	(Honduras) Real Sociedad	(Honduras) Olimpia	
30 December 2017	(Honduras) Bayron Méndez	(Honduras) Olimpia	(Honduras) Platense	
2 January 2018	(Honduras) Maylor Núñez	(Honduras) Motagua	(Honduras) Valle	
2 January 2018	(Honduras) Henry Güity	(Honduras) Motagua	(Honduras) Valle	
3 January 2018	(Brazil) Sergio Barboza	(Honduras) Juticalpa	TBD	
3 January 2018	(Honduras) Clinton Arzú	(Honduras) UPNFM	(Honduras) Real España	
3 January 2018	(Honduras) Víctor Moncada	(Honduras) Vida	(Honduras) Juticalpa	
3 January 2018	(Colombia) Andrés Quejada	(Honduras) Olimpia	TBD	
4 January 2018	(Honduras) Gerson Tinoco	(Honduras) Juticalpa	(Guatemala) Petapa	
4 January 2018	(Trinidad and Tobago) Jan-Michael Williams	(Honduras) Juticalpa	TBD	
4 January 2018	(Honduras) Óliver Morazán	(Honduras) Juticalpa	TBD	
4 January 2018	(Honduras) Robbie Matute	(Honduras) Juticalpa	(Honduras) Real Sociedad	
4 January 2018	(Honduras) Brayan García	(Honduras) Vida	(Honduras) Juticalpa	
4 January 2018	(Honduras) Rosendo González	(Honduras) Vida	TBD	
4 January 2018	(Honduras) Maycol Montero	(Honduras) Vida	(Honduras) Real Sociedad	
4 January 2018	(Honduras) Carlos Bernárdez	(Honduras) Vida	TBD	
4 January 2018	(Trinidad and Tobago) Akeem Roach	(Honduras) Vida	TBD	
4 January 2018	(Honduras) Irvin Reyna	Free agent	Honduras Progreso	
4 January 2018	(Trinidad and Tobago) Jerrel Britto	Honduras Progreso	(Honduras) Real Sociedad	
4 January 2018	(Colombia) Mario Abadía	Honduras Progreso	TBD	
4 January 2018	(Honduras) Ian Osorio	(Honduras) Real Sociedad	(Honduras) Platense	
4 January 2018	(Honduras) Luis Lobo	(Honduras) Platense	TBD	
4 January 2018	(Honduras) Roby Norales	(Honduras) Platense	TBD	
4 January 2018	(Honduras) Luis Palacios	(Honduras) Platense	TBD	
4 January 2018	(Brazil) Matheus dos Santos	(Honduras) Platense	TBD	
4 January 2018	(Chile) Carlos Ross	(Honduras) Platense	TBD	
4 January 2018	(Argentina) Fabián Castillo	(Honduras) Platense	TBD	
4 January 2018	(Honduras) Hárlinton Gutierres	(Honduras) Real Sociedad	(Honduras) Valle	
4 January 2018	(Honduras) Efraín López	(Honduras) Real Sociedad	TBD	
4 January 2018	(Honduras) Allan Cárcamo	(Honduras) Real Sociedad	TBD	
4 January 2018	(Honduras) Michael Perelló	(Honduras) Marathón	(Honduras) Real España	
8 January 2018	(Honduras) Eddie Hernández	(Honduras) Motagua	(Kazakhstan) Irtysh Pavlodar	
8 January 2018	(Uruguay) Claudio Cardozo	(Honduras) Real España	TBD	
9 January 2018	(Honduras) Henry Martínez	Honduras Progreso	(Honduras) Juticalpa	
10 January 2018	(Honduras) Sergio Peña	(Honduras) Real Sociedad	TBD	
12 January 2018	(Honduras) Marlon Licona	(Honduras) Motagua	Honduras Progreso	
12 January 2018	(Panama) Luis Ovalle	(Colombia) Deportes Tolima	(Honduras) Olimpia	
12 January 2018	(Honduras) Alexander López	(Honduras) Olimpia	(Costa Rica) Alajuelense	
12 January 2018	(Panama) José Calderón	(Honduras) Marathón	(Panama) Chorrillo	
12 January 2018	(Argentina) Germán Mayenfisch	(Argentina) Deportivo Mandiyú	(Honduras) Motagua	
12 January 2018	(Honduras) Elvin Casildo	(Honduras) Olimpia	(Honduras) UPNFM	
15 January 2018	(Honduras) Bryan Johnson	Honduras Progreso	(Honduras) Marathón	
16 January 2018	(Colombia) Javier Estupiñán	(Honduras) Olimpia	(Honduras) Motagua	
16 January 2018	(Honduras) Éver Alvarado	(Honduras) Olimpia	TBD	
16 January 2018	(Honduras) Jorge Benguché	(Honduras) Olimpia	(Honduras) UPNFM	
16 January 2018	(Brazil) Caue Fernandes	(Honduras) Marathón	TBD	
17 January 2018	(Honduras) Elmer Güity	(Honduras) Olimpia	TBD	
17 January 2018	(Honduras) Allan Turcios	(Honduras) Real España	(Honduras) Atlético Limeño	
17 January 2018	(Dominica) Briel Thomas	(Trinidad and Tobago) W Connection	(Honduras) Vida	
17 January 2018	(Suriname) Dimitrie Apai	(Trinidad and Tobago) W Connection	(Honduras) Vida	
17 January 2018	(Saint Lucia) Malik St. Prix	(Trinidad and Tobago) W Connection	(Honduras) Vida	
17 January 2018	(Honduras) Johny Gómez	Honduras Progreso	TBD	
22 January 2018	(Argentina) Nicolás Del Grecco	(Argentina) Libertad	(Honduras) Olimpia	
24 January 2018	(Honduras) Luis López	(Honduras) Real España	(United States) Los Angeles FC	
24 January 2018	(Honduras) Israel Fonseca	(Honduras) Olimpia	(Honduras) Juticalpa	
24 January 2018	(Honduras) Marlon Peña	(Honduras) Real España	(Honduras) Real Sociedad	
24 January 2018	(Colombia) Jaime Córdoba	(Colombia) Once Caldas	(Honduras) Olimpia	
25 January 2018	(Honduras) Aldo Oviedo	(Honduras) Real Sociedad	(Honduras) Juticalpa	
25 January 2018	(Colombia) James Cabezas	(El Salvador) Águila	(Honduras) Juticalpa	
25 January 2018	(Trinidad and Tobago) Jamille Boatswain	(Costa Rica) Alajuelense	Honduras Progreso	
25 January 2018	(Honduras) Marlon Ramírez	(Honduras) Juticalpa	(Egypt) ENPPI	
25 January 2018	(Colombia) Roberto Riascos	(Honduras) Social Sol	(Honduras) Real Sociedad	
25 January 2018	(Honduras) Wilson Palacios	Free agent	(Honduras) Olimpia	

=== Liga Nacional ===
==== Apertura ====
Playoffs
3	Olimpia	2	2	4
6	UPNFM	2	0	2
4	Real España	3	2	5
5	Juticalpa	2	0	2

Semifinals
2	Motagua	0	3	3
3	Olimpia	2	1	3
1	Marathón	0	3	3
4	Real España	3	1	4

Finals
1	Motagua	0	2	2
2	Real España	2	1	3

==== Clausura ====
Playoffs
4	Real España	1	0	1
5	Honduras Progreso	1	0	1
3	Olimpia	0	2	2
6	Platense	0	1	1

Semifinals
1	Marathón	1	2	3
4	Real España	0	1	1
2	Motagua	0	1	1
3	Olimpia	0	1	1

Finals
1	Marathón	1	0	1 (5)
2	Motagua	1	0	1 (4)

=== Honduran Supercup ===
2 August 2017	Marathón	1–2	Motagua	San Pedro Sula, Cortés
19:00 CST	Lacayo 83'		67' Andino; 77' Crisanto	Stadium: Estadio Francisco Morazán; Referee: Orlando Hernández

=== CONCACAF Champions League ===
Round of 16
(United States) Colorado Rapids	0	0	0
(Canada) Toronto FC	2	0	2
(Costa Rica) Herediano	2	1	3
(Mexico) UANL	2	3	5
(Costa Rica) Saprissa	1	1	2
(Mexico) América	5	1	6
(Panama) Tauro (a)	1	2	3
(United States) FC Dallas	0	3	3
(El Salvador) Santa Tecla	2	0	2
(United States) Seattle Sounders FC	1	4	5
(Dominican Republic) Cibao	0	0	0
(Mexico) Guadalajara	2	5	7
(Honduras) Motagua	0	1	1
(Mexico) Tijuana	1	1	2
(Honduras) Olimpia	1	0	1
(United States) New York Red Bulls	1	2	3

Quarter-finals
(Canada) Toronto FC (a)	2	2	4
(Mexico) UANL	1	3	4
(Mexico) América	4	3	7
(Panama) Tauro	0	1	1
(United States) Seattle Sounders FC	1	0	1
(Mexico) Guadalajara	0	3	3
(Mexico) Tijuana	0	1	1
(United States) New York Red Bulls	2	3	5

Semi-finals
(Canada) Toronto FC	3	1	4
(Mexico) América	1	1	2
(Mexico) Guadalajara	1	0	1
(United States) New York Red Bulls	0	0	0

Final
(Canada) Toronto FC	1	2	3 (2)
(Mexico) Guadalajara (p)	2	1	3 (4)

=== CONCACAF League ===
Round of 16
(Costa Rica) Santos de Guápiles	6	2	8
(Trinidad and Tobago) San Juan Jabloteh	2	1	3
(Panama) Chorrillo	1	1	2
Honduras Progreso	0	0	0
(Trinidad and Tobago) Central	1	0	1
(Panama) Árabe Unido	2	3	5
(El Salvador) Águila (p)	1	0	1 (4)
(Nicaragua) Real Estelí	0	1	1 (3)
(Honduras) Olimpia	2	1	3
(Costa Rica) Alajuelense	0	0	0
(Honduras) Platense	1	1	2
(El Salvador) Alianza	2	2	4
(Jamaica) Portmore United	1	0	1 (4)
(Panama) Plaza Amador (p)	0	1	1 (5)
(Nicaragua) Walter Ferretti	4	1	5
(Belize) Belmopan Bandits	1	0	1

Quarter-finals
(Panama) Chorrillo	0	0	0
(Costa Rica) Santos de Guápiles	1	1	2
(El Salvador) Águila	0	1	1
(Panama) Árabe Unido	2	0	2
(El Salvador) Alianza	1	1	2
(Honduras) Olimpia	0	3	3
(Nicaragua) Walter Ferretti	0	1	1
(Panama) Plaza Amador	0	2	2

Semi-finals
(Panama) Árabe Unido	0	0	0
(Costa Rica) Santos de Guápiles	0	1	1
(Panama) Plaza Amador	1	1	2
(Honduras) Olimpia	7	1	8

Final
(Honduras) Olimpia (p)	0	1	1 (4)
(Costa Rica) Santos de Guápiles	1	0	1 (1)

=== Other matches ===
8 July 2017 Friendly	Tela	0–0	Marathón	Tela, Atlántida
15:30				Stadium: Estadio León Gómez

8 July 2017 Friendly	Real España	1–2	UPNFM	San Pedro Sula, Cortés
	Zalazar 60'		2' Róchez; 35' Padilla	Stadium: Real España's training ground

9 July 2017 Friendly	Cantarranas team	0–4	Olimpia	Cantarranas, Francisco Morazán
				Stadium: Estadio Francisco Gaitán

15 July 2017 Friendly	Juticalpa (Honduras)	2–3	(El Salvador) Luis Ángel Firpo	Juticalpa, Honduras
19:00				Stadium: Estadio Juan Ramón Brevé Vargas

15 July 2017 Friendly	Olimpia	5–0	Honduras Progreso	Tegucigalpa, Francisco Morazán
	Rojas 4' 17' 68'; Mejía 55'; Flores 76'			Stadium: Estadio Tiburcio Carías Andino

16 July 2017 Friendly	New Orleans Stars (United States)	0–0 (2–1 p)	(Honduras) Motagua	New Orleans, United States
20:00				Stadium: Behrman Stadium

18 July 2017 Friendly	Olimpia (Honduras)	2–0	(El Salvador) Águila	Tegucigalpa, Honduras
18:00	Méndez; Rojas			Stadium: Estadio Tiburcio Carías Andino

21 July 2017 Friendly	Alajuelense (Costa Rica)	3–0	(Honduras) Motagua	Heredia, Costa Rica
19:15	Barrantes 1'; Cordero 30' (pen.); Guevara 89'			Stadium: Estadio Eladio Rosabal Cordero; Referee: Juan Calderón (CRC)

23 July 2017 Friendly	Saprissa (Costa Rica)	2–2	(Honduras) Motagua	San José, Costa Rica
11:00	Angulo 24'; Bengtson 83'		44' Andino; 47' Bernárdez	Stadium: Estadio Ricardo Saprissa Aymá; Referee: Jeffrey Solís (CRC)

23 July 2017 Friendly	Juticalpa	1–2	Olimpia	Juticalpa, Olancho
15:00	Güity 2'		41' Costly; 56' Mejía	Stadium: Estadio Juan Ramón Brevé Vargas

25 July 2017 Friendly	Santos de Guápiles (Costa Rica)	0–0	(Honduras) Motagua	Guápiles, Costa Rica
20:00				Stadium: Estadio Ebal Rodríguez; Referee: Franklin Angulo (CRC)

30 July 2017 Friendly	Motagua	0–2	Real España	Tegucigalpa, Francisco Morazán
16:00			55' Cardozo; 74' Tejeda	Stadium: Estadio Tiburcio Carías Andino; Referee: Óscar Moncada
Note: Partido por la Paz (Game for peace) where Ronaldinho took part and wore both teams' jerseys.

18 March 2018 Friendly	New Orleans Stars (United States)	0–2	(Honduras) Real España	New Orleans, United States
			(pen.) Martínez; Flores

8 June 2018 Friendly	Alianza (El Salvador)	2–4	(Honduras) Olimpia	Uniondale, United States
EST	Díaz		40' Costly; 63' 68' 90' Martínez	Stadium: Mitchel Athletic Complex

10 June 2018 Friendly	Alianza (El Salvador)	3–1	(Honduras) Olimpia	Washington, D.C., United States
EST	Cornejo 26'; Monterrosa 49'; Díaz 51'		Mejía	Stadium: Robert F. Kennedy Memorial Stadium

== Deaths ==
Date	Name	Born	Notes
29 July 2017	(Honduras) Mario González	1994 or 1995 (aged 23)	Former C.D. Honduras Progreso footballer
19 August 2017	(Honduras) Héctor Murillo	–	Honduran referee. Car accident.
20 August 2017	(Honduras) Andy Drummond	1986 or 1987 (aged 30)	Former Platense F.C. footballer. Car crash.
22 September 2017	(Honduras) Lenard Welsh	13 November 1935 (aged 81)	Played for the Honduras national team, F.C. Motagua and C.D. Troya. Respiratory arrest.
8 January 2018	(Honduras) Juan García	8 March 1988 (aged 29)	Honduran international footballer. Leukemia.
17 February 2018	(Honduras) Jorge Matute	1965 or 1966 (aged 53)	Former C.D. Victoria president. Heart attack.
28 March 2018	(Argentina) Santiago Vergara	15 September 1991 (aged 26)	Active F.C. Motagua's footballer. Leukemia.
