= 2013 J.League Division 1 =

21st season of J1 League

J.League Division 1
- Season: 2013
- Champions: Sanfrecce Hiroshima; 2nd J.League title 7th Japanese title
- Relegated: Oita Trinita; Júbilo Iwata; Shonan Bellmare
- Champions League: Sanfrecce Hiroshima; Yokohama F. Marinos; Kawasaki Frontale; Cerezo Osaka
- Matches: 306
- Goals: 879 (2.87 per match)
- Top goalscorer: Yoshito Ōkubo (26 goals)
- Highest attendance: 62,632; Marinos vs Albirex
- Lowest attendance: 5,698; Júbilo vs Albirex
- Average attendance: 17,226

The 2013 J.League Division 1 season was the 48th season of Japanese top-flight football and the 21st since the establishment of the J.League in 1992. The season began on 2 March and finished on 7 December.

Sanfrecce Hiroshima were the defending champions.

== Clubs ==
Vissel Kobe, Gamba Osaka and Consadole Sapporo were relegated at the end of the 2012 season after finishing in the bottom three places of the table. Consadole Sapporo returned to J2 after only one season in the top flight, while Vissel Kobe was relegated after six seasons in the top flight. Gamba Osaka, instead, was relegated for the first time since the creation of J.League in 1993 and the first time since their forerunners, Matsushita Electric Soccer Club, were relegated to the second Division of the Japan Soccer League after the 1986–87 season.

The three relegated teams were replaced by 2012 J.League Division 2 champions Ventforet Kofu, runners-up Shonan Bellmare and sixth-placed and play-off winner team Oita Trinita. Kofu made an immediate return to the top division, while Shonan returned after a two-year absence. In the end, Oita beat JEF United Chiba in the playoff final and returned in J1 after three seasons in the second division. Due to Oita's promotion, it will be the first time to have 2 clubs in the top-flight league competitions from Kyushu since 2006, and Kansai region will have only one club competing in the top flight first time since 1994 season due to Kobe and Gamba's relegations.

Locations of the 2013 J.League 1 teams

Club name	Hometown(s)	Stadium	Capacity	Note(s)
Albirex Niigata	Niigata & Seirō, Niigata	Denka Big Swan Stadium	42,300	
Cerezo Osaka	Osaka	Nagai Stadium	47,816	
FC Tokyo	Tokyo	Ajinomoto Stadium	49,970	
Júbilo Iwata	Iwata, Shizuoka	Yamaha Stadium	15,165	
Kashima Antlers	Kashima, Ibaraki	Kashima Soccer Stadium	40,728	
Kashiwa Reysol	Kashiwa	Kashiwa Soccer Stadium	15,900	2013 ACL Participant (2012 Emperor's Cup Winners)
Kawasaki Frontale	Kawasaki, Kanagawa	Todoroki Athletics Stadium	26,232	
Nagoya Grampus	Nagoya	Paloma Mizuho Stadium	27,000	
Oita Trinita	Ōita	Ōita Stadium	40,000	Promoted from J2 League (6th place/play-off winner in J2 2012)
Omiya Ardija	Ōmiya, Saitama	NACK5 Stadium	15,500	
Sagan Tosu	Tosu, Saga	Tosu Stadium	24,490	
Sanfrecce Hiroshima	Hiroshima	Hiroshima Big Arch	50,000	2013 ACL participant (Champions in J1 2012)
Shimizu S-Pulse	Shizuoka	IAI Stadium Nihondaira	20,339	
Shonan Bellmare	Hiratsuka, Kanagawa	Shonan BMW Stadium	18,500	Promoted from J2 League (Runners-up in J2 2012)
Urawa Red Diamonds	Urawa, Saitama	Saitama Stadium	63,700	2013 ACL participant (3rd place in J1 2012)
Vegalta Sendai	Sendai, Miyagi	Yurtec Stadium	19,694	2013 ACL participant (Runners-up in J1 2012)
Ventforet Kofu	Kōfu, Yamanashi	Yamanashi Chuo Bank Stadium	17,000	Promoted from J2 League (Champions in J2 2012)
Yokohama F. Marinos	Yokohama & Yokosuka	Nissan Stadium	72,327	

=== Personnel and kits ===
Club	Head coach	Kit manufacturer	Front shirt sponsor
Albirex Niigata	(Japan) Masaaki Yanagishita	Adidas	Kameda Seika
Cerezo Osaka	(Brazil) Levir Culpi	Mizuno	Yanmar
FC Tokyo	(Serbia) Ranko Popović	Adidas	Lifeval
Júbilo Iwata	(Japan) Takashi Sekizuka	Puma	Yamaha
Kashima Antlers	(Brazil) Toninho Cerezo	Nike	Lixil
Kashiwa Reysol	(Brazil) Nelsinho Baptista	Yonex	Hitachi
Kawasaki Frontale	(Japan) Yahiro Kazama	Puma	Fujitsu
Nagoya Grampus	(Serbia) Dragan Stojković	Le Coq Sportif	Toyota
Oita Trinita	(Japan) Kazuaki Tasaka	Puma	Daihatsu Kyushu
Omiya Ardija	(Japan) Tsutomu Ogura	Under Armour	NTT Docomo
Sagan Tosu	(South Korea) Yoon Jong-hwan	Warrior	DHC
Sanfrecce Hiroshima	(Japan) Hajime Moriyasu	Nike	EDION
Shimizu S-Pulse	(Iran) Afshin Ghotbi	Puma	Suzuyo
Shonan Bellmare	(South Korea) Cho Kwi-jae	Penalty	Tri Terasu
Urawa Red Diamonds	(Serbia) Mihailo Petrović	Nike	Polus
Vegalta Sendai	(Japan) Makoto Teguramori	Asics	Iris Ohyama
Ventforet Kofu	(Japan) Hiroshi Jofuku	Mizuno	Hakubaku
Yokohama F. Marinos	(Japan) Yasuhiro Higuchi	Adidas	Nissan

=== Foreign players ===
Club	Player 1	Player 2	Player 3	AFC player	Non-visa foreign	Type-C contract	Former player(s)
Albirex Niigata	(Brazil) Léo Silva	(Brazil) Roger Gaúcho	(South Korea) Kim Jin-su	(South Korea) Kim Kun-hoan			(Brazil) Bruno Lopes
Cerezo Osaka	(Brazil) Branquinho	(Brazil) Edno	(Brazil) Fábio Simplício	(South Korea) Kim Jin-hyeon		(South Korea) Gu Sung-yun	
FC Tokyo	(Brazil) Lucas Severino	(Serbia) Nemanja Vučićević		(South Korea) Jang Hyun-soo			
Júbilo Iwata	(Brazil) Carlinhos Paraíba	(South Korea) Baek Sung-dong	(South Korea) Cho Byung-kuk	(South Korea) Jung Woo-young			
Kashima Antlers	(Brazil) Davi	(Brazil) Juninho					
Kashiwa Reysol	(Brazil) Cléo	(Brazil) Jorge Wagner	(Brazil) Leandro Domingues	(South Korea) Kim Chang-soo			
Kawasaki Frontale	(Brazil) Jeci	(Brazil) Renatinho			(North Korea) An Byong-jun	(Brazil) Alan Pinheiro (Brazil) Róbson	(Brazil) Patric
Nagoya Grampus	(Brazil) Daniel Tijolo	(Colombia) Danilson Córdoba	(North Macedonia) Nikola Jakimovski	(Australia) Joshua Kennedy	(Brazil) Tiago		
Oita Trinita	(Brazil) Rodrigo Mancha			(South Korea) Choi Jung-han		(South Korea) Kim Jung-hyon	(South Korea) Kim Yeong-gi
Omiya Ardija	(Australia) Lucas Neill	(Slovenia) Milivoje Novaković	(Slovenia) Zlatan Ljubijankić	(South Korea) Cho Young-cheol			(Brazil) Carlinhos Paraíba
Sagan Tosu	(Brazil) Nilson	(South Korea) Kim Min-woo		(South Korea) Yeo Sung-hae	(South Korea) Kim Jung-ya	(Colombia) Jonathan Restrepo	(Brazil) Roni (Colombia) Diego Ambuila
Sanfrecce Hiroshima	(Croatia) Mihael Mikić	(South Korea) Hwang Seok-ho	(South Korea) Lee Dae-heon	(South Korea) Park Hyung-jin		(South Korea) Kim Jeong-seok	
Shimizu S-Pulse	(Montenegro) Dženan Radončić	(Netherlands) Calvin Jong-a-Pin	(South Korea) Lee Ki-je	(South Korea) Lee Min-soo			(Brazil) Baré
Shonan Bellmare	(Brazil) Alex Muralha	(Brazil) Wellington	(North Macedonia) Stevica Ristić	(South Korea) Han Kook-young			(Bolivia) Edivaldo Hermoza (Brazil) Thiago Quirino
Urawa Red Diamonds	(Brazil) Márcio Richardes						(Serbia) Ranko Despotović
Vegalta Sendai	(Brazil) Diogo Oliveira	(Brazil) Heberty	(Brazil) Wilson		(North Korea) Ryang Yong-gi		
Ventforet Kofu	(Brazil) Gilsinho	(Brazil) Marquinhos Paraná	(Brazil) Patric	(South Korea) Choi Sung-keun			(Brazil) Douglas (Brazil) Hugo Almeida (Brazil) Lenny (Brazil) William Pottker (Paraguay) José Ortigoza
Yokohama F. Marinos	(Brazil) Dutra	(Brazil) Fábio Aguiar	(Brazil) Marquinhos	(South Korea) Jeong Dong-ho			

== League table ==
Pos	Team	Pld	W	D	L	GF	GA	GD	Pts	Qualification or relegation
1	Sanfrecce Hiroshima (C)	34	19	6	9	51	29	+22	63	Qualification for 2014 AFC Champions League group stage (Note: The winners of the 2013 Emperor's Cup qualify for the group stage of the 2014 AFC Champions League. As the Emperor's Cup winners were Yokohama F. Marinos, who had already qualified to ACL through the championship, the remaining spot was awarded to the fourth-placed team.)
2	Yokohama F. Marinos	34	18	8	8	49	31	+18	62	Qualification for 2014 AFC Champions League group stage
3	Kawasaki Frontale	34	18	6	10	65	51	+14	60	Qualification for 2014 AFC Champions League group stage
4	Cerezo Osaka	34	16	11	7	53	32	+21	59	Qualification for 2014 AFC Champions League group stage
5	Kashima Antlers	34	18	5	11	60	52	+8	59	
6	Urawa Red Diamonds	34	17	7	10	66	56	+10	58	
7	Albirex Niigata	34	17	4	13	48	42	+6	55	
8	FC Tokyo	34	16	6	12	61	47	+14	54	
9	Shimizu S-Pulse	34	15	5	14	48	57	−9	50	
10	Kashiwa Reysol	34	13	9	12	56	59	−3	48	
11	Nagoya Grampus	34	13	8	13	47	48	−1	47	
12	Sagan Tosu	34	13	7	14	54	63	−9	46	
13	Vegalta Sendai	34	11	12	11	41	38	+3	45	
14	Omiya Ardija	34	14	3	17	45	48	−3	45	
15	Ventforet Kofu	34	8	13	13	30	41	−11	37	
16	Shonan Bellmare (R)	34	6	7	21	34	62	−28	25	Relegation to 2014 J.League Division 2
17	Júbilo Iwata (R)	34	4	11	19	40	56	−16	23	Relegation to 2014 J.League Division 2
18	Oita Trinita (R)	34	2	8	24	31	67	−36	14	Relegation to 2014 J.League Division 2

Updated to match(es) played on 7 December 2013. Source: J.League Division 1
Rules for classification: 1) points; 2) goal difference; 3) number of goals scored.
(C) Champions; (R) Relegated

== Results ==
Home \ Away	ALB	ANT	ARD	BEL	CER	FMA	FRO	GRA	JÚB	RED	REY	SAG	SFR	SSP	TOK	TRI	VEG	VEN
Albirex Niigata		2–3	1–0	3–2	1–0	1–0	2–1	2–0	4–2	0–2	3–2	3–1	1–2	3–1	0–3	2–3	1–0	1–1
Kashima Antlers	1–0		1–0	1–0	1–0	2–1	4–1	3–1	1–1	1–2	3–1	1–2	0–2	3–1	3–2	3–1	3–2	0–0
Omiya Ardija	1–1	3–1		2–1	0–3	1–0	2–3	2–1	3–0	1–0	2–3	1–1	2–1	2–2	2–5	0–1	0–2	1–2
Shonan Bellmare	0–2	1–2	0–1		0–3	1–2	1–1	1–1	1–1	2–2	1–2	1–1	0–2	1–1	3–2	2–1	3–2	1–2
Cerezo Osaka	1–0	1–2	1–2	2–1		2–1	0–0	2–1	2–0	2–2	1–1	4–1	1–0	4–1	1–0	0–0	1–1	0–1
Yokohama F. Marinos	0–2	1–1	2–1	4–2	1–1		2–1	1–2	2–1	3–0	1–1	2–1	1–0	1–0	3–2	1–1	0–0	1–1
Kawasaki Frontale	2–1	4–2	2–1	1–2	2–2	1–0		2–1	2–1	4–0	3–1	0–1	2–0	2–0	2–2	1–1	4–2	1–1
Nagoya Grampus	2–0	3–1	2–1	2–0	1–1	1–2	1–2		1–1	2–0	3–2	3–2	1–1	2–1	0–2	2–1	0–2	0–0
Júbilo Iwata	2–1	2–3	0–1	4–0	2–2	0–1	2–4	2–3		1–2	0–1	3–3	0–2	0–1	0–0	3–1	1–1	1–1
Urawa Red Diamonds	1–0	3–1	4–0	2–0	2–5	2–3	1–3	1–0	2–1		2–1	6–2	3–1	0–1	2–2	4–3	1–1	1–1
Kashiwa Reysol	1–1	2–1	0–4	5–2	1–3	2–1	3–1	3–3	1–3	2–6		2–1	1–1	2–2	4–1	3–1	0–0	2–0
Sagan Tosu	1–3	1–1	2–1	1–0	2–0	0–1	5–4	1–1	1–0	4–1	0–3		0–2	0–1	2–3	3–2	1–0	2–1
Sanfrecce Hiroshima	2–0	0–0	3–1	1–0	1–0	1–3	4–2	1–1	2–1	1–2	0–0	2–0		3–1	1–2	1–0	1–0	5–1
Shimizu S-Pulse	1–2	4–3	1–0	3–1	1–1	0–5	1–2	2–1	1–0	0–2	1–2	6–4	0–4		0–0	3–1	2–0	2–1
FC Tokyo	2–0	1–4	0–1	2–1	1–2	0–2	2–0	3–1	2–2	3–2	3–0	2–3	0–1	2–0		2–0	2–0	4–1
Oita Trinita	1–3	2–3	0–2	1–2	0–2	0–1	0–1	1–2	1–1	2–2	0–0	2–4	1–1	2–3	1–2		0–1	0–1
Vegalta Sendai	0–1	2–1	2–1	0–0	1–1	0–0	2–1	2–1	1–1	3–3	2–1	1–1	0–2	1–2	2–1	6–0		1–1
Ventforet Kofu	1–1	3–0	0–3	0–1	1–2	0–0	1–3	0–1	2–1	0–1	3–1	0–0	2–0	0–2	1–1	0–0	0–1	

Updated to match(es) played on 7 December 2013. Source: J. League Division 1
Legend: Blue = home team win; Yellow = draw; Red = away team win.

== Top scorers ==
Rank	Scorer	Club	Goals
1	(Japan) Yoshito Ōkubo	Kawasaki Frontale	26
2	(Japan) Kengo Kawamata	Albirex Niigata	23
3	(Japan) Yoichiro Kakitani	Cerezo Osaka	21
4	(Japan) Yohei Toyoda	Sagan Tosu	20
5	(Japan) Masato Kudo	Kashiwa Reysol	19
5	(Japan) Yuya Osako	Kashima Antlers	19
7	(Japan) Hisato Satō	Sanfrecce Hiroshima	17
7	(Japan) Kazuma Watanabe	FC Tokyo	17
9	(Brazil) Marquinhos	Yokohama F. Marinos	16
10	(Brazil) Wilson	Vegalta Sendai	13
10	(Japan) Shinzo Koroki	Urawa Red Diamonds	13

Updated to games played on 7 December 2013
Source: J. League

== Awards ==
=== Player of the Month ===
Month	Player	Club
March	(Japan) Shunsuke Nakamura	Yokohama F. Marinos
April	(Slovenia) Zlatan Ljubijankič	Omiya Ardija
May	(Japan) Yoichiro Kakitani	Cerezo Osaka
June	N/A	
July	(Japan) Shusaku Nishikawa	Sanfrecce Hiroshima
August	(Japan) Yuya Osako	Kashima Antlers
September	(Japan) Ariajasuru Hasegawa	FC Tokyo
October	(Japan) Tetsuya Enomoto	Yokohama F. Marinos
November	(Japan) Yoshito Ōkubo	Kawasaki Frontale

=== Best XI ===
Position	Player	Club
GK	(Japan) Shusaku Nishikawa	Sanfrecce Hiroshima
DF	(Japan) Daisuke Nasu	Urawa Red Diamonds
DF	(Japan) Masato Morishige	FC Tokyo
DF	(Japan) Yuji Nakazawa	Yokohama F. Marinos
MF	(Japan) Hotaru Yamaguchi	Cerezo Osaka
MF	(Japan) Shunsuke Nakamura	Yokohama F. Marinos
MF	(Japan) Toshihiro Aoyama	Sanfrecce Hiroshima
MF	(Japan) Yoichiro Kakitani	Cerezo Osaka
FW	(Japan) Kengo Kawamata	Albirex Niigata
FW	(Japan) Yoshito Ōkubo	Kawasaki Frontale
FW	(Japan) Yuya Osako	Kashima Antlers

== Attendances ==
Pos	Team	Total	High	Low	Average	Change
1	Urawa Red Diamonds	630,701	54,905	23,295	37,100	+1.3%
2	Yokohama F. Marinos	467,425	62,632	12,537	27,496	+19.8%
3	Albirex Niigata	443,906	33,378	18,919	26,112	+4.4%
4	FC Tokyo	426,246	40,371	12,905	25,073	+4.7%
5	Cerezo Osaka	319,928	36,361	9,119	18,819	+11.3%
6	Kawasaki Frontale	282,952	21,657	12,345	16,644	−6.5%
7	Kashima Antlers	279,115	32,305	6,681	16,419	+6.7%
8	Sanfrecce Hiroshima	275,556	27,911	10,045	16,209	−8.5%
9	Nagoya Grampus	274,297	30,478	9,237	16,135	−5.9%
10	Vegalta Sendai	252,725	17,892	11,755	14,866	−10.4%
11	Shimizu S-Pulse	240,324	21,420	9,238	14,137	−6.5%
12	Ventforet Kofu	214,441	28,906	7,754	12,614	+21.2%^{†}
13	Kashiwa Reysol	213,406	34,021	7,013	12,553	−8.8%
14	Sagan Tosu	184,242	22,530	6,292	11,515	−4.0%
15	Oita Trinita	202,557	23,814	7,067	11,915	+22.6%^{†}
16	Omiya Ardija	189,342	13,365	7,412	11,138	+4.7%
17	Júbilo Iwata	185,207	20,049	5,698	10,895	−17.0%
18	Shonan Bellmare	168,481	13,786	6,080	9,911	+44.6%^{†}
	League total	5,271,047	62,632	5,698	17,226	−1.9%

Updated to games played on 7 December 2013
Source: J. League Division 1
Notes:
^{†} Team played previous season in J2.
