= Pablo Ortiz (disambiguation) =

Pablo Ortiz (1952–2001) was an American construction superintendent killed in the September 11 attacks.

Pablo Ortiz may also refer to:

- Pablo Ortiz García (born 1952), Ecuadorian diplomat, ambassador to the European Union
- Pablo Ortiz (footballer, born 1998), Colombian football midfielder for Deportes Quindío
- Pablo Ortiz (footballer, born 2000), Colombian football centre-back for DAC 1904
- Pablo Ortíz (footballer, born 2002), Mexican football left-back for Tijuana
- Pablo Ortiz Monasterio (born 1952), Mexican photographer, writer and editor

Where Ortiz is the second surname:

- Pablo Acosta Ortiz (1864–1914), Venezuelan physician, academic and politician
