= Emilio Umanzor =

Honduran football coach (born 1973)

Personal information
- Full name: Eugenio Emilio Umanzor Andino
- Date of birth: 19 October 1973 (age 53)
- Place of birth: Olanchito, Honduras
- Position: Defender

Senior career*
Years	Team	Apps	(Gls)
- Social Sol

Managerial career
- 2007–2008: Real Juventud
- 2008–2011: Honduras U-17
- 2008–2011: Honduras U-20
- 2011–2013: Parrillas One
- 2013: Deportes Savio
- 2013–: Lepaera San Isidro
- * Club domestic league appearances and goals

Eugenio Emilio Umanzor Andino (born 19 October 1973) is a Honduran football coach.

== Club career ==
Umanzor played for hometown side Social Sol in the Honduran second division.

== Managerial career ==
Umanzor brought Real Juventud to the Honduran top division winning two consecutive championships, 2007-08 Apertura and 2007-08 Clausura but was replaced by Edwin Pavón in October 2008 after he left the club citing they owed him wages.

He has been coach of the Honduras U-17 national football team and Honduras U-20 national football team. He is the only coach to qualify two world cups in the same year.

In June 2011 he took charge of second division side Parrillas One but left them after club president Luis Girón released four players without consulting Umanzor. In December 2012, Umanzor was named the new manager of Deportes Savio but he was dismissed in March 2013.

He was appointed manager of Honduran second division outfit Lepaera San Isidro for the 2013 Apertura.
