= C.D. Real de Minas =

Honduran football club

Real de Minas
- Full name: Club Deportivo Real de Minas
- Founded: 2012
- Ground: Estadio Marcelo Tinoco, Minas, Danlí
- Capacity: 8,000
- Chairman: Gerardo Martinez
- Manager: Raul Caceres
- League: Liga Nacional
- 2019 Apertura: Liga Nacional, 6th (regular season); DNQ (postseason)
Home colours	Away colours

C.D. Real de Minas, formerly Infop RNP, was a football club located in Minas, Danlí, Honduras.

== History ==
The club was established in 2012 as Infop RNP, the team was almost entirely formed by employees from the National Register of Persons, who decided to create an amateur team. They later opted to enter the Major League (third division), a tournament which they eventually won in 2016, earning them the right to participate in the second division. Still as Infop RNP, the club obtained their second major achievement in December 2017, after defeating Villanueva F.C. in the Apertura tournament of the 2017–18 Ascenso season. Earlier that year, they participated at the 2017 Honduran Cup with great success. In the beginning of 2018, the club unsuccessfully attempted to rename the club from Infop RNP to Tegucigalpa Fútbol Club. In June 2018, the club gained promotion to Honduran Liga Nacional. Prior starting playing in the 2018–19 season, the club finally decided to change their name to Club Deportivo Real de Minas and unveiled their new logo on 29 June 2018. On 28 July 2018, Moisés López scored the historic first Liga Nacional goal for the club in the 1–3 defeat against Club Deportivo Olimpia at Estadio Roberto Martínez Ávila.

== Stadium ==
During their journey in Liga de Ascenso, the team played their home matches at Estadio Birichiche, located a few meters south from Estadio Tiburcio Carías Andino in Tegucigalpa. Once in Liga Nacional, they announced that they will be playing in Tegucigalpa, Danlí and Siguatepeque. After the new year in 2019, they made the Stadium in Danli their official stadium.

== Current squad ==
Note: Flags indicate national team as defined under FIFA eligibility rules; some limited exceptions apply. Players may hold more than one non-FIFA nationality.

No.	Pos.	Nation	Player
1	GK	HON	Jorge Mendoza
2	DF	HON	Ronald García
3	DF	HON	Nelson Muñoz
4	MF	HON	Jean Rivera
6	MF	HON	Óscar Mazariegos
7	FW	HON	Luís Umanzor
8	FW	HON	Luís Espinal
9	FW	HON	Gerlin Calderón
10	MF	HON	Jesse Moncada
11	FW	HON	Julián Galo
12	DF	HON	Nelson Vallejo
13	FW	BRA	Israel Silva
14	FW	HON	Arnol Ávila
15	MF	HON	Carlos Gutiérrez
16	FW	HON	Elton Torres
17	FW	HON	Anderson Ávila

No.	Pos.	Nation	Player
18	MF	HON	Carlos Moncada
19	FW	HON	Brayan Aroca
20	DF	HON	Walter Orellana
21	MF	HON	Óscar Padilla
22	GK	HON	Walter Flores
23	MF	COL	Pablo Ortiz
24	GK	HON	Julio Meléndez
25	MF	HON	Brayan Acosta
26	MF	HON	Alex Corrales
28	FW	HON	Richard Martínez
30	MF	HON	Moisés López
31	MF	HON	Ramón Amador
33	FW	HON	Rembrandt Flores
34	GK	HON	Donaldo Morales
35	FW	HON	Frédixon Elvir

== League and cups performance ==
Regular season			Postseason		Others		
Season	Finish	Record	Finish	Record	Cup	Supercup	International
2018–19 A	10th	3–2–13 (15:38)	Didn't enter		Round of 16	Didn't enter	
2018–19 C	7th	4–8–6 (21:22)	Saved	1–0–1 (6:5)	Round of 16	Didn't enter	

== Achievements ==
- Liga de Ascenso

Winners (2): 2017–18 A, 2017–18 C
