= Pablo Ortiz (footballer, born 1998) =

Colombian footballer (born 1998)

Personal information
- Full name: Pablo Andrés Ortíz González
- Date of birth: 7 January 1998 (age 28)
- Place of birth: Cali, Colombia
- Height: 1.78 m (5 ft 10 in)
- Position: Midfielder

Team information
- Current team: Slovan Levice

Youth career
- Force F.C.
- Liverpool FC International; Academy Michigan

Senior career*
Years	Team	Apps	(Gls)
- Demize NPSL
2018	Golden State Force	2	(1)
2019–2021	Real de Minas	6	(0)
2021–2024	One Knoxville SC		
2024–2025	Atlético Colegiales		
2025–2026	Deportes Quindío	14	(0)
2026–	Slovan Levice	0	(0)
- * Club domestic league appearances and goals as of 22:46, 12 March 2026 (UTC)

Pablo Andrés Ortiz Gonzalez (born 7 January 1998) is a Colombian footballer who plays for Slovakian 4. Liga club Slovan Levice.

== Career statistics ==
=== Club ===
As of 29 July 2020.

Club	Season	League			Cup		Continental		Other		Total	
Club	Season	Division	Apps	Goals	Apps	Goals	Apps	Goals	Apps	Goals	Apps	Goals
Golden State Force	2018	PDL	2	1	0	0	–		0	0	2	1
Real de Minas	2019–20	Liga Salva Vida	6	0	0	0	0	0	0	0	6	0
Atletico Colegiales	2024–2025	Liga de Intermedia										
