= CARDVA =

Honduran football club

- Full name: Centro de Alto Rendimiento Deportivo Valle de Aguan
- Founded: 15 June 2015; 9 years ago
- Ground: Estadio Rafael Ruíz Leiva
- League: Liga Nacional de Ascenso de Honduras

CARDVA is a Honduran football club based in the town of Coyoles Central, near Olanchito.

The team participates in the Honduran Liga Nacional de Ascenso.
