= Diego Ambuila =

Colombian footballer (born 1993)

Personal information
- Full name: Diego Luis Ambuila Carabali
- Date of birth: 18 July 1993 (age 33)
- Place of birth: Colombia
- Height: 1.83 m (6 ft 0 in)
- Position: Forward

Senior career*
Years	Team	Apps	(Gls)
2013	Sagan Tosu		
2014–2015	Once Caldas		
2015	Bogotá		
2016	Universitario del Beni		
2016	Club Always Ready		
2017–	Juticalpa		
- * Club domestic league appearances and goals

Diego Ambuila (born 18 July 1993) is a Colombian football player.
