= Lepaera F.C. =

Football club in Honduras

- Full name: Lepaera Football Club
- Ground: Estadio Juan Orlando Hernández; Lepaera, Honduras
- Manager: Emilio Umanzor
- League: Liga Nacional de Ascenso
Home colours	Away colours

Lepaera Football Club is a Honduran football club based in Lepaera, Honduras.

The club currently plays in Honduran Liga Nacional de Ascenso.

== History ==
Was founded in 2013 with the name Lepaera F.C. In December 2016, they won their first official title as they conquered the 2016–17 Liga de Ascenso season. They play their home games at Estadio Juan Orlando Hernández which was inaugurated on 9 November 2012.

== Achievements ==
- Liga de Ascenso

Winners (1): 2016–17 A
