= Lepaera =

- Municipality
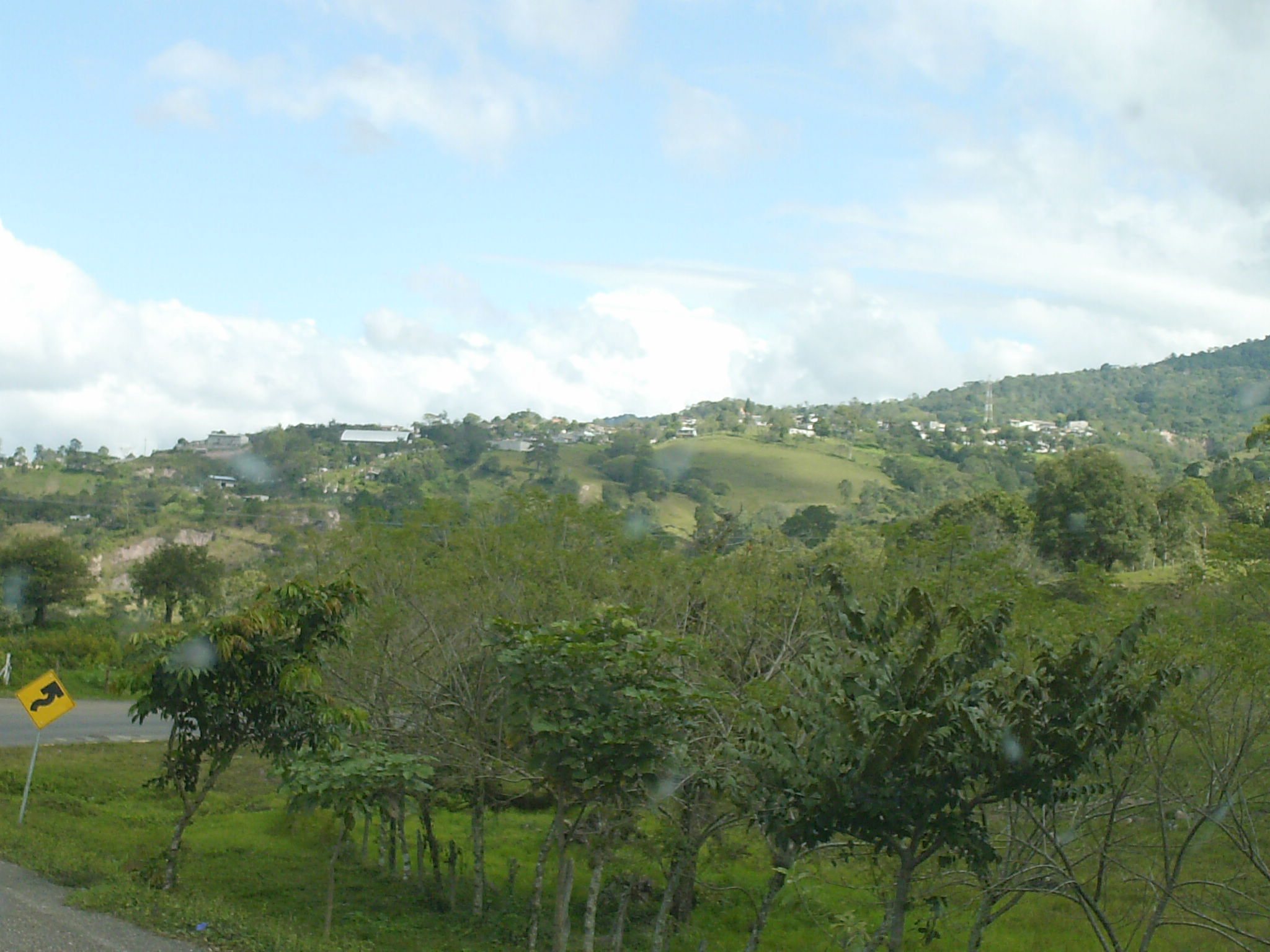
- Right before entering Lepaera

- Location in Honduras
- Coordinates: 14°47′N 88°35′W
- Country: Honduras
- Department: Lempira
- City since: 8 October 1956; 69 years ago

Area
  - Total: 312 km^{2} (120 sq mi)

Population (2015)
  - Total: 37,876
  - Density: 121/km^{2} (314/sq mi)

Lepaera is a municipality in the Honduran department of Lempira. It has tropical climate all year round.

Lepaera is one of the oldest municipalities of the Lempira department. It is also the departmental capital of the municipality. The distance to Lepaera from Gracias is 15 km on the road that leads to Santa Rosa de Copán Access is paved but dangerous curves necessitate caution.

== History ==
It is considered an "autochthonous" settlement since 1538 with inhabitants such as Lencas, Toltecas or Chorties Indians, it is believed that these people came from the region of "Cuscatlán" in El Salvador. Between 1536 and 1538, when the Spanish colonist founded the city of Gracias, there was Lepaera already, as well as other municipalities. The title of City was granted under decree No 81 on 8 October 1956.

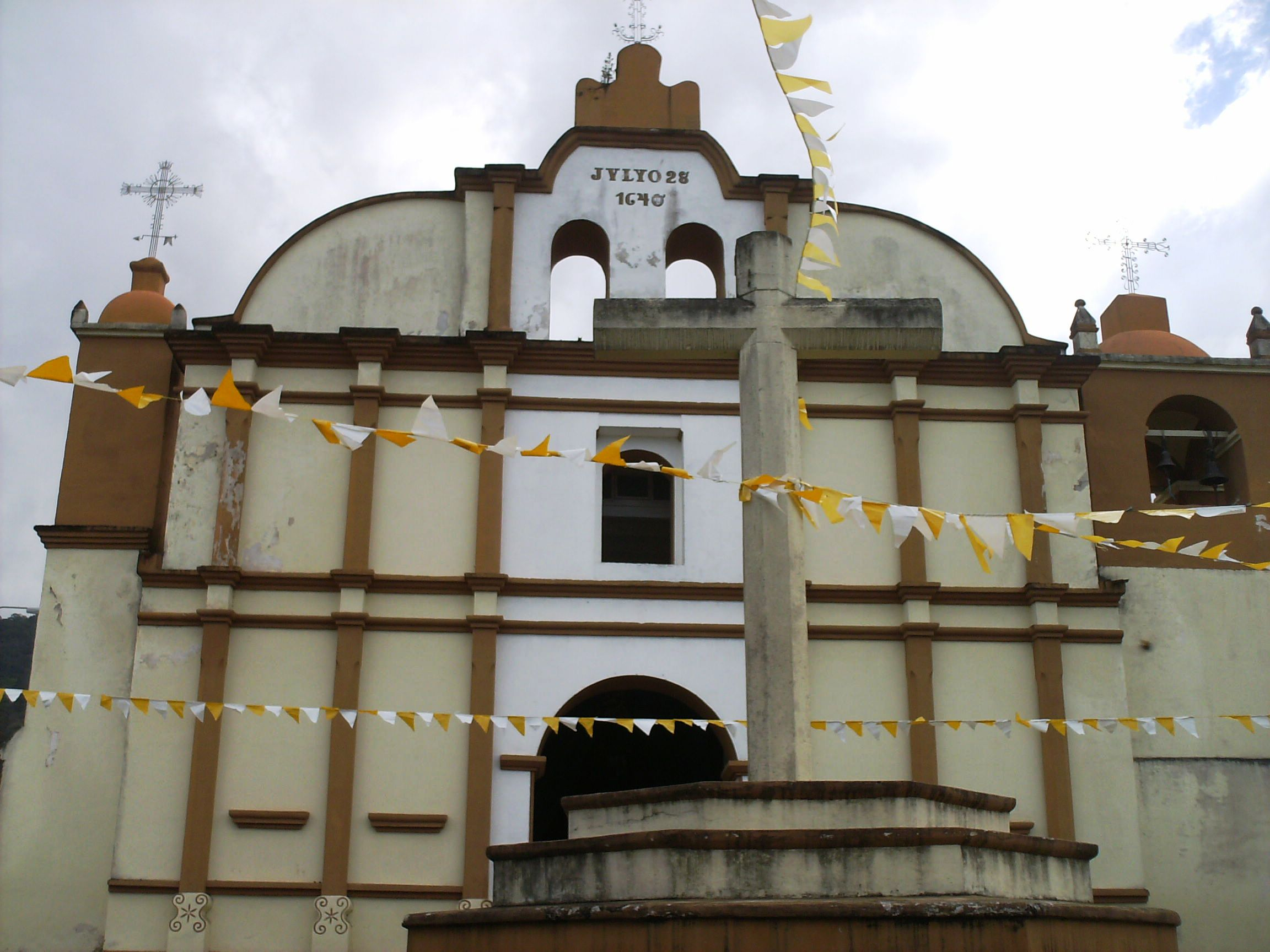
The old church

== Geography ==
It was established at the toe of "Puca" mountain, and it is surrounded by several other hills. Downtown of the departmental capital has steep streets. The elevation from sea level is proper for coffee plantations. It has sub tropical and pine forests on the highest parts, but the weather in the departmental capital is warm due to deforesting.

== Boundaries ==
Its boundaries are:

- North : Santa Barbara department.
- South : Gracias and Las Flores municipalities.
- East : La Iguala municipality and "Santa Barbara" department.
- West : Copán department.
- Surface Extents: 312 km^{2}

== Resources ==
Planting, gathering, and processing of coffee grains represents the most important commercial activity of this municipality. The 2nd most important activity is commerce. The coffee production makes the city grow faster each year. It has several hardware stores, groceries stores, and a gas station at the entrance of the city. Also it has electricity and mobile communications services. The water is obtained from wells and some streams coming from "Puca" mountain.

== Population ==
The native Indians descendants have been displaced a long time by the cross-breed of Spanish and Indians.

- Population: The figure was 3,866 people in 2001. Based on this, an estimate was elaborated for 2015, resulting in 37,876.
- Villages: 45
- Settlements: 135

=== Demographics ===
At the time of the 2013 Honduras census, Lepaera municipality had a population of 36,720. Of these, 96.15% were Mestizo, 2.72% Indigenous (2.42% Lenca), 0.78% White, 0.32% Black or Afro-Honduran and 0.03% others.

== Tourism ==
Lepaera's streets are narrow and distinctive. The old Catholic church, perhaps one of the oldest in Lempira department. in the city's downtown area bears the following inscription: JVLYO 28 1640 (28 July 1640). There are several locations where tourists can buy Café de Palo, a regional specialty beverage prepared by roasting coffee beans mixed with spices over an open fire or a comal.

- Local Holidays: "Santiago" day on 25 July and also "Señor de Esquipulas" day on 25 January.

== Sports ==
The local football team, Lepaera San Isidro, play in the Honduran second division.

== Gallery ==
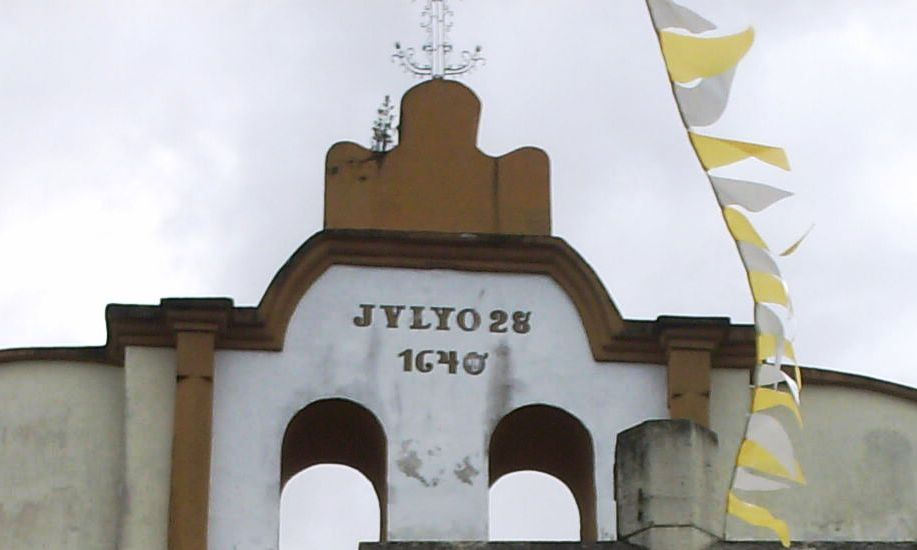
"28 July 1640"

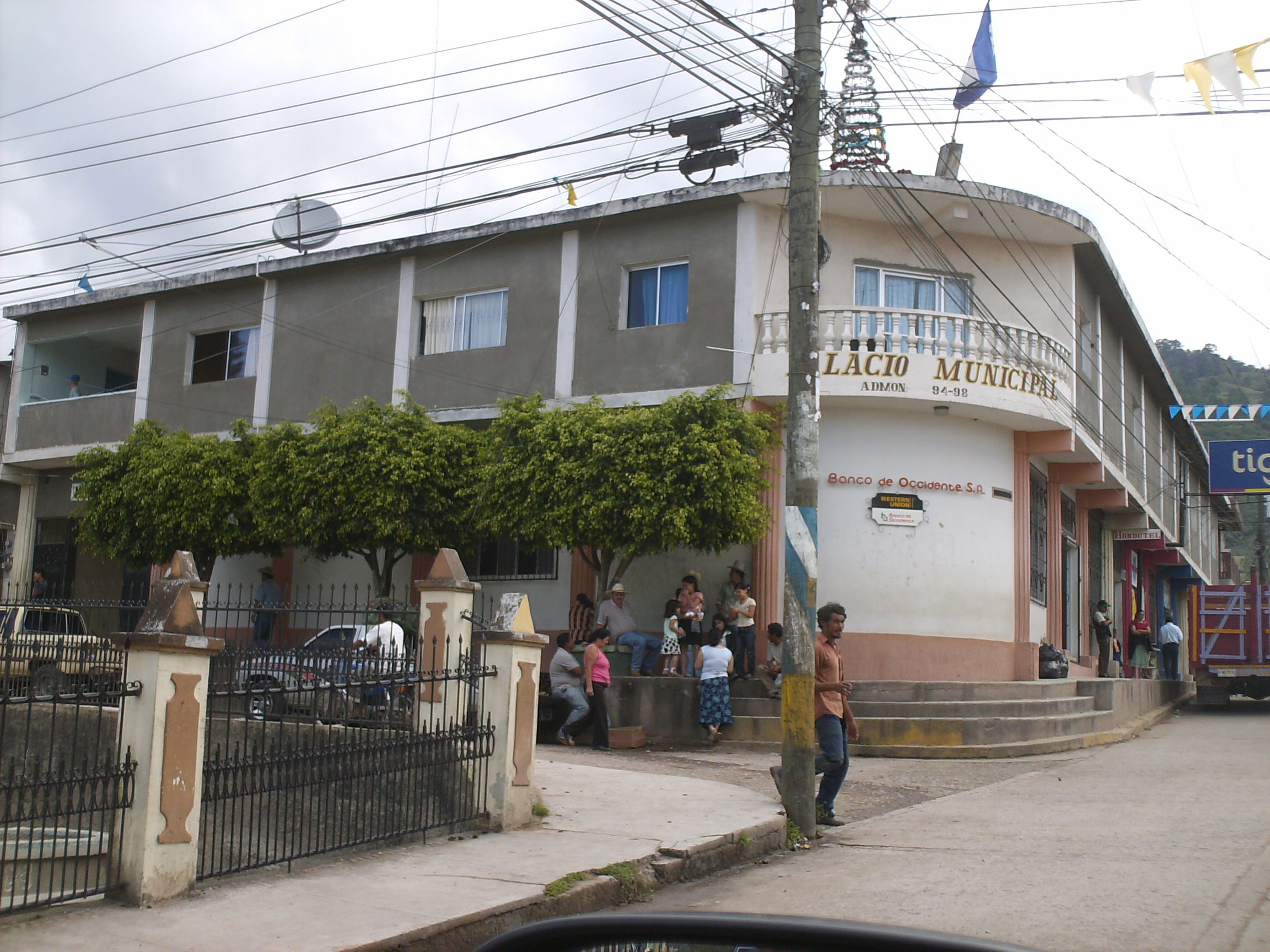
The Mayor's office

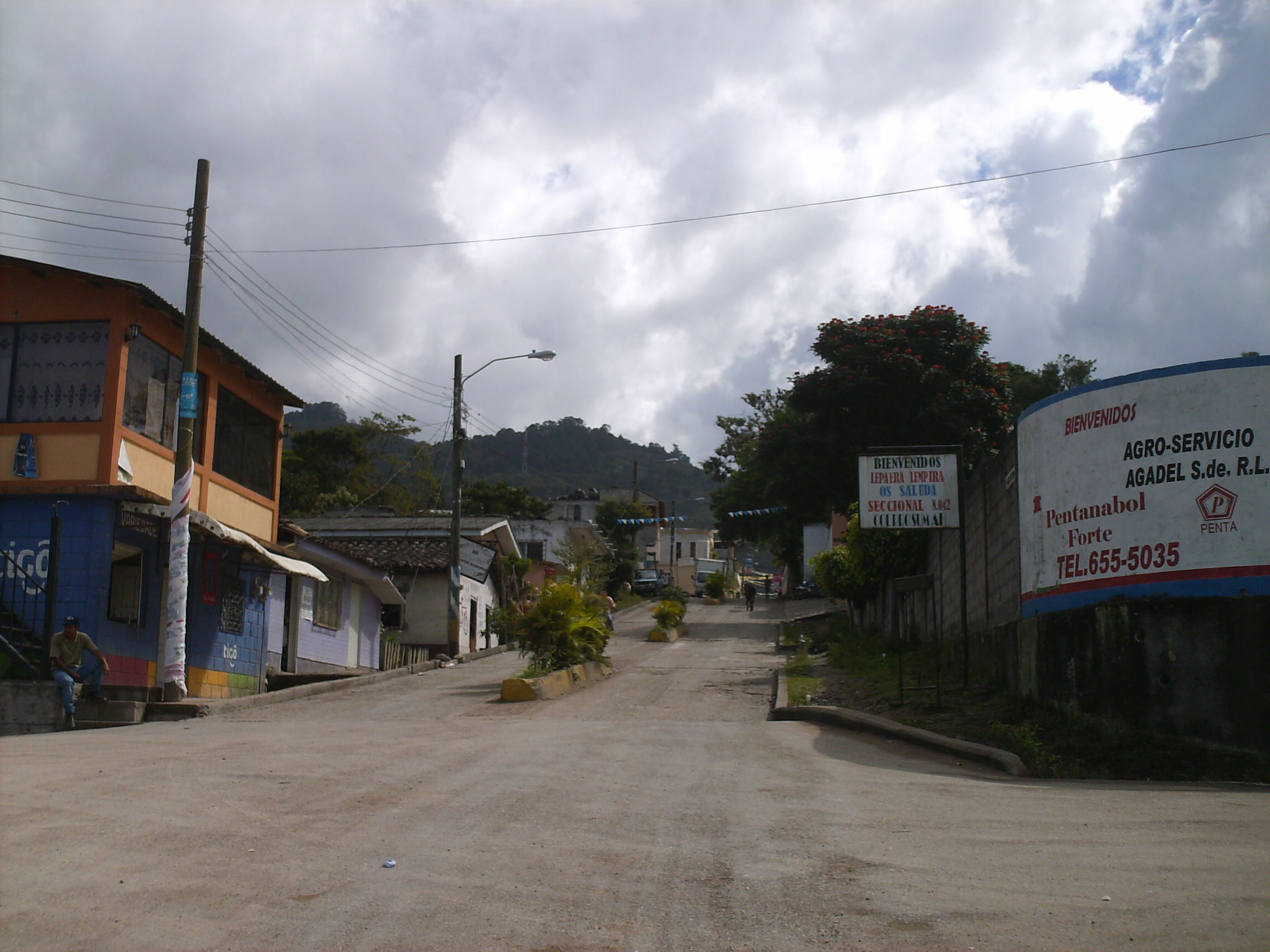
The main entrance

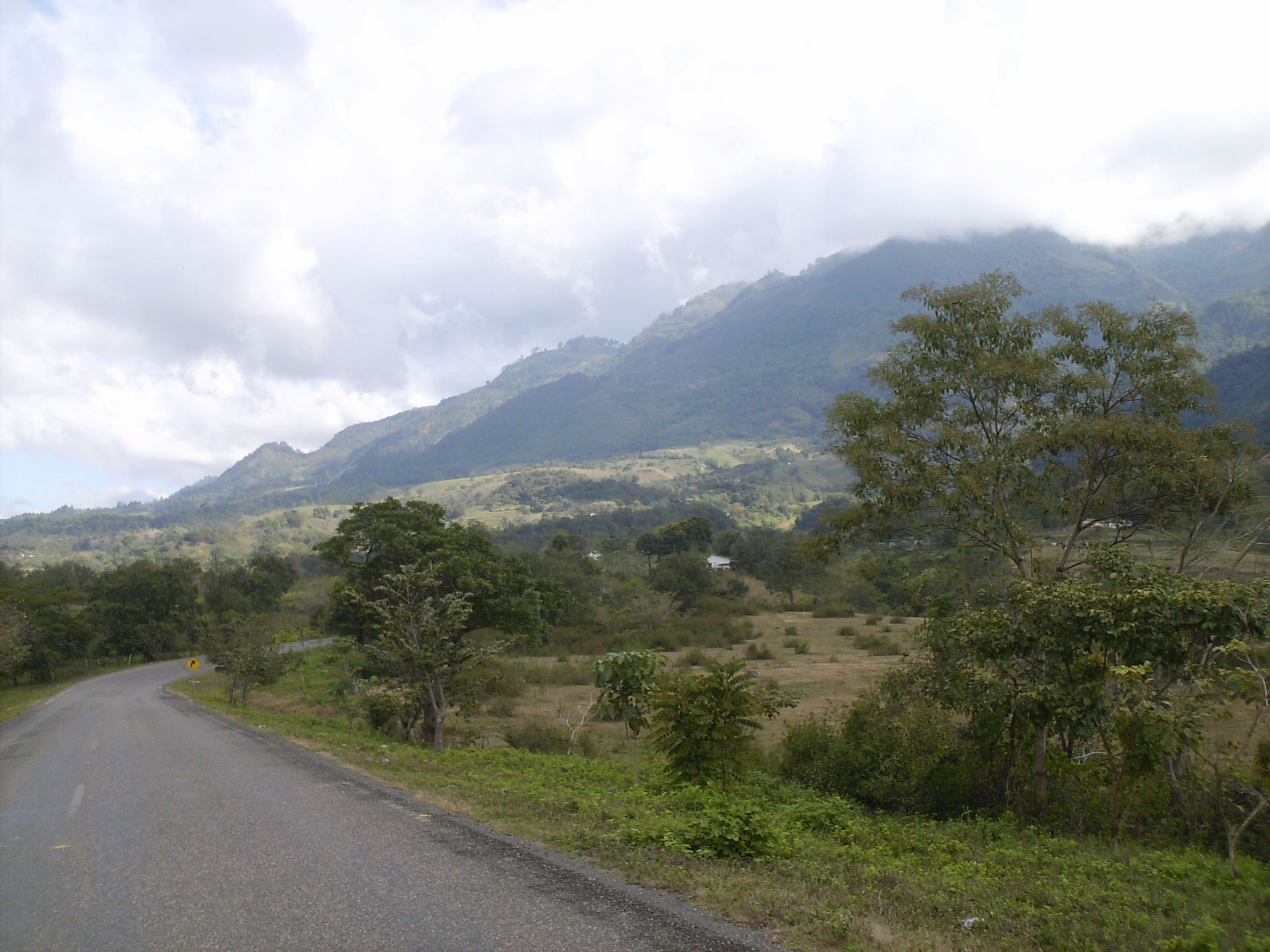
Puca Mountain
