= Valle F.C. =

Valle FC
- Full name: Valle Futbol Club
- Ground: Estadio José Elias Nazar; Nacaome, Honduras
- League: Liga Nacional de Ascenso de Honduras
Home colours	Away colours

Valle F.C. is a Honduran football club based in Nacaome, Honduras.

They play their home games at the Estadio José Elias Nazar.

== History ==
They were promoted from Honduran Liga Mayor to Honduran Liga Nacional de Ascenso in summer 2013 after defeating Juventus (from Guaimaca) on a 3–1 aggregated score. In April 2018, they lost to Brasilia F.C. and were relegated back to Liga Mayor.
