= Villanueva F.C. =

Honduran football club

Villanueva
- Full name: Villanueva FC
- Nickname(s): Tigres Cañeros (Cane Tigers); Azucareros (Sugar makers)
- Ground: Estadio José Adrian Cruz; Villanueva, Honduras
- Manager: Dennis Allen
- League: Liga de Ascenso
Home colours

Villanueva FC is a Honduran football club based in Villanueva, Cortés.

Villanueva currently plays in the Honduran second division. They play their home games at the Estadio José Adrian Cruz.

== Achievements ==
- Liga de Ascenso

Runners-up (1): 2016–17 C

== Managers ==
- (Honduras) Carlos Orlando Caballero (−2013)
- (Honduras) Juan "Montuca" Castro (Jun 2013 – Jul 2013)
- (Honduras) Dennis Allen (2013–)
