= List of presidents of Honduras =

This article lists the presidents of Honduras, since the country declared its independence from the Spanish Empire on 15 September 1821.

== Heads of state of Honduras within the Federal Republic of Central America (1821–1839) ==
On 1 July 1823 Honduras, along with Guatemala, El Salvador, Nicaragua and Costa Rica, declared its independence from the First Mexican Empire to form the short lived Federal Republic of Central America, also known as United Provinces of Central America. Honduras remained as a member state until it decided to separate in 1838. The entire union dissolved in civil war between 5 November 1838, when Nicaragua separated from the federation, and about 1840.

No.	Portrait	Head of State (Birth–Death)	Term of office			Political party
No.	Portrait	Head of State (Birth–Death)	Took office	Left office	Time in office	Political party
1		Dionisio de Herrera (1781–1850); Supreme Director	16 September 1824	10 May 1827 (Deposed)	2 years, 236 days	Liberal
2		José Justo Milla (1794–1838)	10 May 1827	13 September 1827	126 days	Liberal
—		Cleto Bendaña (–); Provisional	13 September 1827	24 October 1827	41 days	Conservative
3		José Jeronimo Zelaya (–)	27 October 1827	11 November 1827	15 days	Conservative
4		Miguel Eusebio Bustamante (–)	11 November 1827	26 November 1827	15 days	Liberal
—		Francisco Morazán (1792–1842); Provisional	26 November 1827	30 June 1828	217 days	Liberal
5		Diego Vigil Cocaña (1799–1845); Manager	30 June 1828	2 December 1829	1 year, 155 days	Liberal
6		Francisco Morazán (1792–1842)	2 December 1829	24 December 1829	22 days	Liberal
7		Juan Ángel Arias (–); Manager	24 December 1829	22 April 1830	119 days	Liberal
(6)		Francisco Morazán (1792–1842)	22 April 1830	28 July 1830	97 days	Liberal
—		José Santos del Valle (–); Provisional	28 July 1830	12 March 1831	227 days	Conservative
8		José Antonio Márquez (–)	12 March 1831	22 March 1832	1 year, 10 days	Conservative
9		José Francisco Milla Guevara (–)	22 March 1832	7 January 1833	291 days	Conservative
10		Joaquín Rivera (–)	7 January 1833	31 December 1836	3 years, 359 days	Independent
—		José María Martínez Salinas (–); Provisional	1 January 1837	28 May 1837	147 days	Independent
11		Justo Herrera (–)	28 May 1837	3 September 1838	1 year, 98 days	Liberal
12		José María Martínez Salinas (–)	3 September 1838	12 November 1838	70 days	Independent
13		José Lino Matute (–)	12 November 1838	9 January 1839	58 days	Liberal

== Presidents of independent Honduras (1839–present) ==
Honduras declared itself independent on 15 November 1838, and a constitution was formally adopted in January 1839. After a period of instability, conservative General Francisco Ferrera became the first elected president of the country for a two-year term, but then extended his de facto control of the nation for the next five years.

Most presidents after 1900 represent one of the two dominant political parties, the Liberal Party of Honduras (PLH) and the National Party of Honduras (PNH).

The most recent general election was held on 30 November 2025, with Nasry Asfura of the PNH elected president, taking office on 27 January 2026.

No.	Portrait	President (Birth–Death)	Elected	Term of office			Political party
No.	Portrait	President (Birth–Death)	Elected	Took office	Left office	Time in office	Political party
1		Juan Francisco de Molina (1779–1878)	—	11 January 1839	13 April 1839	92 days	Liberal
—		Felipe Neri Medina (1797–?); Acting President	—	13 April 1839	15 April 1839	2 days	Liberal
—		Juan José Alvarado (1798–1857); Acting President	—	15 April 1839	27 April 1839	12 days	Independent
—		José María Guerrero (1799–1853); Acting President	—	27 April 1839	10 August 1839	105 days	Conservative
—		Mariano Garrigó (1810–?); Acting President	—	10 August 1839	20 August 1839	10 days	Independent
—		José María Bustillo (?–1855); Acting President	—	20 August 1839	27 August 1839	7 days	Conservative
—		Council of Ministers	—	27 August 1839	21 September 1839	25 days	Council of Ministers
—		Francisco Zelaya y Ayes (1798–1848); Acting President	—	21 September 1839	1 January 1841	1 year, 102 days	Conservative
2		Francisco Ferrera (1794–1851)	—	1 January 1841	31 December 1842	1 year, 364 days	Conservative
—		Council of Ministers	—	1 January 1843	23 February 1843	53 days	Council of Ministers
3		Francisco Ferrera (1794–1851)	—	23 February 1843	31 December 1844	1 year, 312 days	Conservative
—		Council of Ministers	—	1 January 1845	8 January 1845	7 days	Council of Ministers
4		Coronado Chávez (1807–1881)	—	8 January 1845	1 January 1847	1 year, 358 days	Conservative
—		Council of Ministers	—	1 January 1847	12 February 1847	42 days	Council of Ministers
5		Juan Lindo (1790–1857)	—	12 February 1847	1 February 1852	4 years, 354 days	Conservative
—		Francisco Gómez (?–1854); Acting President	—	1 February 1852	1 March 1852	29 days	Liberal
6		José Trinidad Cabañas (1805–1871)	1852	1 March 1852	18 October 1855	3 years, 231 days	Liberal
—		José Santiago Bueso (1815–1857); Acting President	—	18 October 1855	8 November 1855	21 days	Liberal
—		Francisco de Aguilar (1810–?); Acting President	—	8 November 1855	17 February 1856	101 days	Liberal
7		José Santos Guardiola (1816–1862)	1856; 1860	17 February 1856	11 January 1862	5 years, 328 days	Conservative
—		José Francisco Montes (1830–1888); Acting President	—	11 January 1862	4 February 1862	24 days	Liberal
—		Victoriano Castellanos (1796–1862); Acting President	—	4 February 1862	11 December 1862	310 days	Liberal
—		José Francisco Montes (1830–1888); Acting President	—	11 December 1862	7 September 1863	270 days	Liberal
—		José María Medina (1826–1878); Acting President	—	7 September 1863	31 December 1863	115 days	Conservative
—		Francisco Inestroza (1810–?); Acting President	—	31 December 1863	15 March 1864	75 days	Conservative
—		Francisco Cruz Castro (1820–1895); Provisional President	—	5 September 1869	14 January 1870	131 days	Conservative
8		José María Medina (1826–1878)	1864; 1866; 1869	15 March 1864	26 July 1872	8 years, 133 days	Conservative
—		Céleo Arias (1835–1890); Provisional President	—	26 July 1872	13 January 1874	1 year, 171 days	Liberal
9		Ponciano Leiva (1821–1896)	1874	13 January 1874	8 June 1876	2 years, 147 days	Conservative
—		Marcelino Mejía; Provisional President	—	8 June 1876	13 June 1876	5 days	Conservative
—		Crescencio Gómez (1833–1921); Provisional President	—	13 June 1876	12 August 1876	60 days	Conservative
—		José María Medina (1826–1878); Provisional President	—	12 August 1876	27 August 1876	15 days	Conservative
10		Marco Aurelio Soto (1846–1908)	1877; 1881	27 August 1876	19 October 1883	7 years, 53 days	Liberal
—		Council of Ministers	—	19 October 1883	30 November 1883	42 days	Council of Ministers
11		Luis Bográn (1849–1895)	1883; 1887	30 November 1883	30 November 1891	8 years	Conservative
12		Ponciano Leiva (1821–1896)	1891	30 November 1891	7 August 1893	1 year, 250 days	Conservative
13		Domingo Vásquez (1846–1909)	1893	7 August 1893	22 February 1894	199 days	Conservative
14		Policarpo Bonilla (1858–1926)	1894	22 February 1894	1 February 1899	4 years, 344 days	Liberal
15		Terencio Sierra (1839–1907)	1898	1 February 1899	1 February 1903	4 years	Liberal
16		Juan Ángel Arias Boquín (1859–1927)	—	1 February 1903	13 April 1903	71 days	Liberal
17		Manuel Bonilla (1849–1913)	1902	13 April 1903	25 February 1907	3 years, 318 days	National
—		Miguel Oquelí Bustillo (1856–1938); Chairman of the Provisional Government Junta	—	25 February 1907	18 April 1907	52 days	Liberal
18		Miguel R. Dávila (1856–1927)	—	18 April 1907	28 March 1911	3 years, 344 days	Liberal
—		Francisco Bertrand (1866–1926); Acting President	—	28 March 1911	1 February 1912	310 days	National
19		Manuel Bonilla (1849–1913)	1911	1 February 1912	21 March 1913	1 year, 48 days	National
20		Francisco Bertrand (1866–1926)	1915	21 March 1913	9 September 1919	6 years, 172 days	National
—		Salvador Aguirre (1862–1947); Acting President	—	9 September 1919	16 September 1919	7 days	National
—		Vicente Mejía Colindres (1878–1966); Acting President	—	16 September 1919	5 October 1919	19 days	Liberal
—		Francisco Bográn (1852–1926); Acting President	—	5 October 1919	1 February 1920	119 days	Liberal
21		Rafael López Gutiérrez (1854–1924)	1919	1 February 1920	10 March 1924	4 years, 68 days	Liberal
—		Francisco Bueso (1860–?); Acting President	—	10 March 1924	27 April 1924	48 days	Liberal
—		Tiburcio Carías Andino (1876–1969); First Chief of the Liberating Revolution	1923	27 April 1924	30 April 1924	3 days	National
—		Vicente Tosta (1886–1930); Provisional President	—	30 April 1924	1 February 1925	277 days	Liberal
22		Miguel Paz Barahona (1863–1937)	1924	1 February 1925	1 February 1929	4 years	National
23		Vicente Mejía Colindres (1878–1966)	1928	1 February 1929	1 February 1933	4 years	Liberal
24		Tiburcio Carías Andino (1876–1969)	1932; 1936; 1939	1 February 1933	1 January 1949	15 years, 335 days	National
25		Juan Manuel Gálvez (1887–1972)	1948	1 January 1949	5 December 1954	5 years, 338 days	National
—		Julio Lozano Díaz (1885–1957); Supreme Head of State	—	5 December 1954	21 October 1956	1 year, 321 days	National
—		Military Junta	—	21 October 1956	21 December 1957	1 year, 61 days	Military
26		Ramón Villeda Morales (1909–1971)	1954; 1957	21 December 1957	3 October 1963 (Deposed)	5 years, 286 days	Liberal
27		Oswaldo López Arellano (1921–2010)	1965	3 October 1963	7 June 1971	7 years, 247 days	Military
28		Ramón Ernesto Cruz Uclés (1903–1985)	1971	7 June 1971	4 December 1972 (Deposed)	1 year, 180 days	National
—		Oswaldo López Arellano (1921–2010); Head of State	—	4 December 1972	22 April 1975 (Deposed)	2 years, 139 days	Military
—		Juan Alberto Melgar Castro (1930–1987); Head of State	—	22 April 1975	7 August 1978	3 years, 107 days	Military
—		Policarpo Paz García (1932–2000); Provisional President	1980	7 August 1978	27 January 1982	3 years, 173 days	Military
29		Roberto Suazo Córdova (1927–2018)	1981	27 January 1982	27 January 1986	4 years	Liberal
30		José Azcona del Hoyo (1927–2005)	1985	27 January 1986	27 January 1990	4 years	Liberal
31		Rafael Leonardo Callejas Romero (1943–2020)	1989	27 January 1990	27 January 1994	4 years	National
32		Carlos Roberto Reina (1926–2003)	1993	27 January 1994	27 January 1998	4 years	Liberal
33		Carlos Roberto Flores (born 1950)	1997	27 January 1998	27 January 2002	4 years	Liberal
34		Ricardo Maduro (born 1946)	2001	27 January 2002	27 January 2006	4 years	National
35		Manuel Zelaya (born 1952)	2005	27 January 2006	28 June 2009 (Deposed)	3 years, 152 days	Liberal
36		Roberto Micheletti (born 1943) (Disputed)	—	28 June 2009	27 January 2010	213 days	Liberal
37		Porfirio Lobo Sosa (born 1947)	2009	27 January 2010	27 January 2014	4 years	National
38		Juan Orlando Hernández (born 1968)	2013; 2017	27 January 2014	27 January 2022	8 years	National
39		Xiomara Castro (born 1959)	2021	27 January 2022	27 January 2026	4 years	Libre
40		Nasry Asfura (born 1958)	2025	27 January 2026	Incumbent (Term ends on 27 January 2030)	197 days	National

== See also ==
- President of Honduras
- List of governors of Spanish Honduras
- History of Honduras
