= First ladies and gentlemen of Honduras =

Spouse of the president of Honduras

First Lady of Honduras
- Primera mujer de Honduras
- Current; Lissette del Cid since 27 January 2026
- Residence: Presidential Palace of Honduras
- Term length: 4 Years (Renewable in a few cases)
- Inaugural holder: Micaela Josefa Quezada Borjas
- Formation: 16 September 1824

First Lady of Honduras (Spanish: Primera dama de Honduras) or First Gentleman of Honduras (Spanish: Primer caballero de Honduras) is the title attributed to the wife or husband of the president of Honduras, concurrent with the president's term of office. The title is currently held by Lissette del Cid, the wife of President Nasry Asfura.

== List of first ladies and first gentleman ==
Name	Image	Head of state/President	Dates	Notes
Micaela Josefa Quezada Borjas		Dionisio de Herrera	1824-1827	(1830–1833)
Mercedes Vidaurre Molina		Justo Milla	1827	
María Ambrosia Garin Zepeda		Miguel Eusebio Bustamante	1827	
Joaquina Josefa de Zelaya Vidaurre		José Jerónimo Zelaya Fiallos	1827	
María Josefa Lastiri		Francisco Morazán	1827–1829, 1830	
Dolores Lastiri Lozano		Diego Vigil	1828–1829	Sister for María Josefa Lastiri Lozano
Juana Lope		Juan Ángel Arias	1829–1830	
Lucía Lastiri Lozano		José Santos Díaz del Valle	1830–1831	Sister for María Josefa Lastiri Lozano
María Manuela Díaz		José Antonio Márquez	1831–1832	
Teresa Márquez Díaz		Joaquín Rivera	1833–1836	Daughter for the president José Antonio Márquez
Margarita Guillén Chávez		José María Martínez Salinas	1837–1838	
Juana Casco		José María Guerrero	1839	Nicaraguan
Petrona Vásquez Alcántara		José María Bustillo	1835/1839–1839	
Dolores Serafín Gómez		Felipe Neri Medina Córdova	13–15 April of 1839	
Mercedes González Herrera		José Francisco Zelaya y Ayes	1838–1840	
Dolores Medina		Francisco Ferrera	1840–1844	
Apolinaria Ayala		Felipe Bustillo	1848	
Josefa Pineda Castejón		Juan Lindo	1848–1852	
Nieves Cabañas Fiallos		José Francisco Gómez y Argüelles	1852 acting	
Petronila Barrios Espinoza		José Trinidad Cabañas	1852	
Soledad Gutiérrez Lozano		Juan López (general)	1852	
Severiana Arbizú		José Santiago Bueso Soto	1855	
Ana Arbizú y Flores		José Santos Guardiola	1855–1862	
María Ana Milla Castejón		Victoriano Castellanos Cortés	1862	
Mariana Milla		José María Medina	1862/1863/1865/1865–1866/1866–1869/1870–1874/1876	
Damiana Gálvez		Crescencio Gómez Valladares	1865	
Nicolasa Avilés		Francisco Cruz Castro	1869–1870	
Jesús Planas Zúñiga		Juan Antonio Medina Orellana	16–26 July 1872	acting first lady
Francisca Boquín		Céleo Arias	1872–1873	
Luisa Castro Acosta		Ponciano Leiva	1874–1876, 1891–1893	
Josefa Dolores Rodezno		José María Zelaya Ayes	1876	
Celestina Mijango (Note: Celestina Mijango (Guatemala, 1850-París, 1940))		Marco Aurelio Soto	1876–1883	
Teresa Morejón Ferrera		Luis Bográn	1883–1891	
Emma Gutiérrez Lozano		Policarpo Bonilla	1894–1899	
Carmen Alemán Saravia		Terencio Sierra	1899–1903	
Margarita Fiallos Castellanos (Note: Margarita Fiallos Castellanos, hija de Francisco Fiallos Ceballos y Rosa Castellanos.)		Juan Ángel Arias Boquín	1903	
Josefa Matute		Manuel Bonilla	1903–1907	
Purificación Rodríguez Estrada		Miguel Oquelí Bustillo	1907	
Narcisa Romero Portillo		Miguel Rafael Dávila Cuéllar	1907–1911	
Victoria Alvarado Burchard		Francisco Bertrand Barahona	1912–1919	
Gumersinda Inestroza Ocampo		Vicente Mejía Colindres	1919, 1929–1933	
Guillermina Leiva Castro		Francisco Bográn Barahona	1919–1920	
Ana Lagos Laínez		Rafael López Gutiérrez	1920–1924	
Francisca Fiallos Inestroza		Vicente Tosta Carrasco	1924–1925	
María Leiva Castro		Miguel Paz Barahona	1925–1928	
Elena Castillo Barahona		Tiburcio Carias Andino	1933–1949	
Laura Bárnes Paredes		Juan Manuel Gálvez	1949–1954	
Laura Vigil Lozano		Julio Lozano Díaz	1954–1956	
Alejandrina Bermúdez Milla		Ramón Villeda Morales	1957–1963	
Gloria Figueroa		Oswaldo López Arellano	1963–1970, 1972–1975	
Luz María Sequeira		Ramón Ernesto Cruz Uclés	1971–1972	
Alba Nora Gúnera		Juan Alberto Melgar Castro	1975–1978	
Carlota Márquez		Policarpo Paz García	1978–1982?	
Aída Zacapa		Roberto Suazo Córdova	1982–1986	
Miriam Bocock Selva		José Simón Azcona	1986–1990	
Norma Regina Gaborit		Rafael Leonardo Callejas	1990–1994	
Bessy Watson		Carlos Roberto Reina	1994–1998	Born in the United States
Mary Flake		Carlos Flores Facussé	1998–2002	Born in United States
Aguas Ocaña		Ricardo Maduro	2002–2006	Born in Spain
Xiomara Castro		Manuel Zelaya	2006–2009	Later served as the 39th president of Honduras.
Siomara Girón		Roberto Micheletti	2009–2010	acting first lady
Rosa Elena Bonilla		Porfirio Lobo	2010–2014	
Ana García Carías		Juan Orlando Hernández	2014–2022	
Manuel Zelaya		Xiomara Castro	2022–2026	Previously served as the president of Honduras from 2006 until he was overthrown in 2009.
Lissette del Cid	Image TBP	Nasry Asfura	2026–present	
