= Photography in Honduras =

The history of photography in Honduras began in the mid-19th century with the arrival of foreign diplomats in the country; from then on, it experienced slow but steady development up to the present day.

== 19th century ==
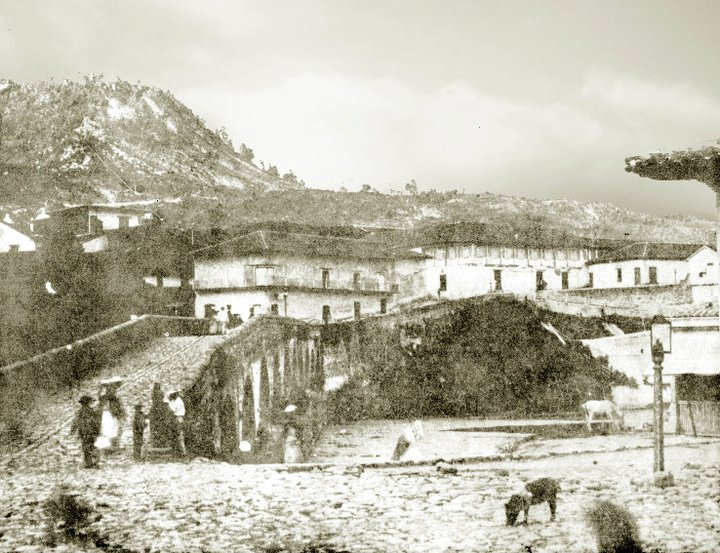
Oldest daguerrotype that still survives today taken in Honduras.

It is not known when the first photograph was taken in Honduras; but the oldest surviving photograph from the country is an 1853 daguerreotype taken by the Austrian diplomat Karl Ritter von Scherzer, showing a view of the Mayol Bridge from Comayagüela. This image is not only the oldest preserved photograph of the country but also holds the distinction of being the first non-drawn image of the nation.

Father José Trinidad Reyes passed away in 1855, and it was decided to take a post-mortem photograph of him; to date, he is the first historical figure from Honduras to be photographed. However, the original negative was lost at some point in history, and the only visual evidence remaining is a copy that was pasted into a book in the 1930s.

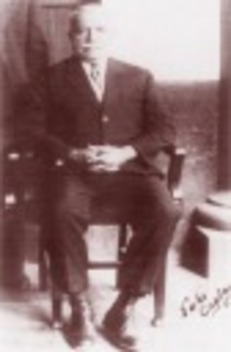
José Jerónimo Zelaya earliest-born Honduran to be captured on camera

José Jerónimo Zelaya was the first head of state to be photographed in Honduras; his portrait dates back to 1864. In addition to being the first president to be photographed, he is considered the earliest-born Honduran to be captured on camera, given that he was born in 1780 and held the office of head of state in 1827.

President José Trinidad Cabañas was also one of the first Honduran presidents to be photographed. This portrait was taken sometime between 1869 and 1870; however, the photograph has not yet been released to the public, although reproductions of it do exist.

Throughout the remainder of the 19th century, photography was a portrait style largely reserved for national elites politicians, landowners, and high-ranking military officers. A notable figure from the end of that century was Juan T. Aguirre; born in Cuba but having emigrated to Honduras, he opened one of the first photography studios in Tegucigalpa, capturing images of illustrious figures, diplomats, and travelers on Honduran soil. Aguirre did not limit himself to portraiture; he also took some of the earliest photographs of Tegucigalpa capturing the city while its original Spanish colonial architecture remained largely intact thereby creating invaluable historical records that document the urban transformation the capital has undergone over the last few centuries.

During this period, archaeologists succeeded in photographing archaeological sites in Honduras. Notable among them are the images taken by archaeologist Alfred Maudslay at Copán in the 1890s, before the site had been excavated. Another significant figure was Dr. George Byron Gordon, whose 1897 explorationcapturing images of various mounds and carved stone stelae near the Ulúa River also documented the area's flora and vegetation.

== 20th century ==
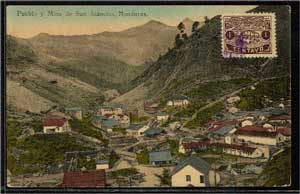
Colorized postcard of San Juancito from 1920.

Photography in Honduras remained largely unchanged during the early 20th century, though the arrival of fruit companies began to shift the landscape; new, far more portable camera models allowed for better images of Honduran monuments and scenery. By the time World War I ended, photography had advanced significantly; models used during the war such as the Kodak Vest Pocket made their way into the country, enabling private individuals to take photographs much more easily than in previous decades.

Even so, photography remained largely inaccessible to the general public; the few who could acquire an American or European camera generally belonged to the upper class or were professional photographers. Nevertheless, these were the first steps toward a new era in which photography would become increasingly accessible to the general public.

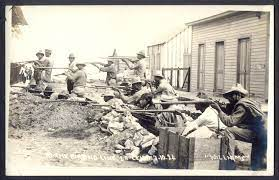
Batlle of La Ceiba in 1924, by Arnold T. Williams

The work of Arnold Theodore Williams stands out during these years; born in Jamaica but having migrated to Honduras, he was hired by fruit companies to document the development of the north coast. Thanks to him, images survive of the banana enclaves and the profound urban development experienced by coastal cities as well as the surrounding natural landscape. He also photographed the Second Honduran Civil War, becoming one of the pioneers of war photojournalism on Honduran soil.

During the 1930s, as Honduran media advanced, newspapers required more photojournalists; by then, there were enough cameras available to begin capturing images for print media. Notable examples include photographs of political events, inaugurations, and swearing-in ceremonies. Particularly significant are the images captured during the dictatorship of General Tiburcio Carías Andino; he relied heavily on photography to bolster his public image, becoming one of the most photographed presidents in Honduran history. Moving into the 1940s, what are likely the only photographs of Honduras during World War II were taken; these document aerial patrols along the north coast, launched in response to the sinking of Honduran ships by German submarines. By this time, color images of the Honduran landscape also existed.

Over the following decades photography underwent a complete transformation; mass media enabled more people to work as photojournalists, and photography became a part of everyday domestic life. The availability of film rolls and cameras ranging from rangefinders to SLRs allowed many people to embrace photography as a routine activity.

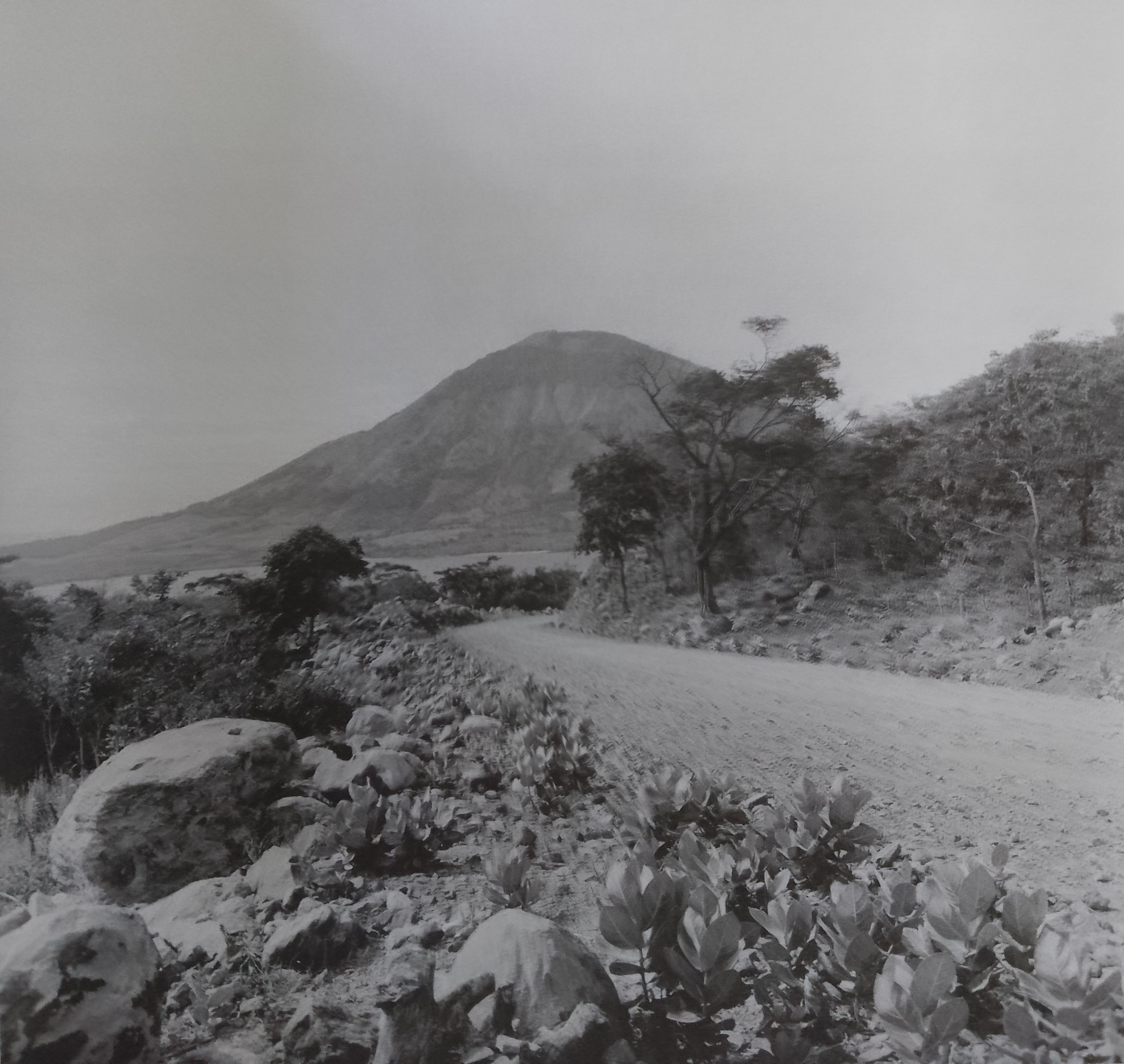
Isla del Tigre, phot taken by Juan Pablo Martell.

Between the 1960s and 1970s, the cameras used by Hondurans shifted predominantly from American to Japanese brands serving both amateur and professional needs. During this period, renowned photographers like Juan Pablo Martell, Evaristo López Rojas, Rafael López Rodas, José Ramiro Osorio, and Max Hernández rose to prominence. Each left a significant mark on the history of Honduran photography by dedicating themselves to documenting both daily life and the social conditions of the country during their era.

During the 1980s and 1990s photography played a significant role in covering events linked to the Central American crisis and Honduras's involvement in it, as well as capturing images of natural disasters such as Hurricane Mitch.

== 21st century ==
The 2000s marked the beginning of the shift from analog to digital technology, Most photographers had to switch to digital systems in the face of this changesmaking image capture easier a trend that continues to this day.

== See also ==
- Honduran art
- Culture of Honduras
