= 1911 Honduran general election =

General elections were held in Honduras between 29 and 31 October 1911. Manuel Bonilla was elected president.

== Background ==
In 1907 president Manuel Bonilla was removed from office and replaced by Miguel R. Dávila. Dávila was confirmed as president by a Constituent Assembly elected the following year. On 10 January 1911 Dávila signed the Paredes-Knox Convention with the United States and American banks, which would guarantee them control of Honduras' customs revenue in return for a loan. This was unpopular with opponents, who accused him of "selling the country to the foreigners". During this period of tension, Bonilla began an invasion, capturing Trujillo on the day the convention was signed, although further advances were stopped by the presence of the USS Tacoma. On 31 January Congress rejected the Paredes-Knox Convention

The United States arranged for mediation between Bonilla and Dávila, whose representatives met on the Tacoma between 21 February and 15 March. Agreement was reached for Dávila to resign and Francisco Bertrand be appointed as provisional president. Dávila subsequently resigned on 28 March and presidential elections were called.

== Results ==
Bonilla was elected president and Francisco Bográn elected vice president. However, Bográn declined to take office and Bertrand was elected in his place.
