= 1870 Honduran presidential referendum =

A referendum on José María Medina remaining President was held in Honduras on 26 March 1870. The proposal was approved by 95.15% of the voters. However, two years later he was ousted from power after a revolt by the Liberals.

== Background ==
Medina was elected President in the February 1864 presidential elections. According to the 1848 constitution he was eligible for a second term in office. However in 1865 Medina convened a Constitutional Convention, which adopted a new constitution on 18 September. This restricted the President to a single term in office, as well as making the National Congress unicameral. The Convention made Medina the provisional President, which was confirmed in a January 1866 election.

In order to win a second term after the adoption of the new constitution. He convened a new Convention, which approved the changes to the constitution and also elected him President for a second term. However, following protests, he held a plebiscite on the issue.

== Results ==
Choice	Votes	%
For	10,649	95.15
Against	542	4.85
Invalid/blank votes		–
Total	11,191	100
Registered voters/turnout	25,000	
Source: Direct Democracy
