= 1924 Honduran general election =

General elections were held in Honduras over three days, beginning on 28 December 1924. Miguel Paz Barahona was elected president and his National Party won all but one of the seats in Congress.

== Background ==
National Party candidate Tiburcio Carías Andino emerged as the leading candidate in the 29 October 1923 presidential elections with 47% of the vote, but failed to win a majority, meaning Congress would have to confirm the winner. Congress, which was controlled by liberals, refused to confirm Carías as the winner. In a Congress vote, 18 voted for Juan Ángel Arias (who had finished third in the popular vote), 15 for Carías and nine for the runner-up Policarpo Bonilla. This led to a two-month civil war starting in February, referred to as the War of Revindication. As a result, American marines were sent into Tegucigalpa to restore peace.

An agreement was signed on the USS Milwaukee on 3 May 1924, which provided for a provisional government led by Vicente Tosta to hold power until fresh elections were held. Participants in the civil war were banned from contesting the presidential election. A new constitution was subsequently drafted and promulgated in September. It introduced residency requirements for Congressional candidates and required presidential candidates to be aged between 30 and 65.

== Presidential candidates ==
While Miguel Paz Barahona was nominated as the National Party candidate, with the United States objecting to the candidacy of Tiburcio Carías Andino, who had won the 1923 elections.

The Liberal Party did not put forward a candidate.

== Results ==
=== President ===
| Candidate | Party | Votes | % |
|---|---|---|---|
| Miguel Paz Barahona | National Party | 72,021 | 91.76 |
| Other candidates | | 6,470 | 8.24 |
| Total | | 78,491 | 100.00 |
Source: MacCallum, Department of State

=== Congress ===
| Party | Seats |
|---|---|
| National Party | 46 |
| Liberal Party | 0 |
| Others | 1 |
| Total | 47 |

== Bibliography ==
- Argueta, Mario. Tiburcio Carías: anatomía de una época, 1923–1948. Tegucigalpa: Editorial Guaymuras. 1989.
- Bardales B., Rafael. Historia del Partido Nacional de Honduras. Tegucigalpa: Servicopiax Editores. 1980.
- Political handbook of the world 1928. New York, 1929.
- Stokes, William S. Honduras: an area study in government. Madison: University of Wisconsin Press. 1950.
