= 1972 Honduran coup d'état =

1972 military action

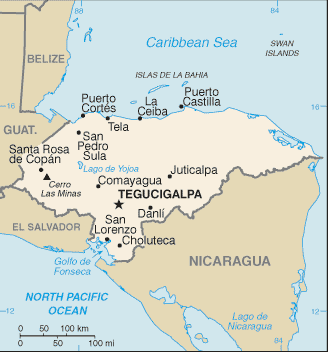
Date	December 2, 1972
Location	Honduras
Result	Coup attempt successful; military rule reinstated: Formation of military junta in bloodless coup

Belligerents
Armed Forces of Honduras	(Honduras) Dissenting faction of the armed forces

Commanders and leaders
(Honduras) Ramon Ernesto Cruz	(Honduras) Oswaldo López Arellano

The 1972 Honduran coup d'état was the successful bloodless coup in Honduras of the Ramon Ernesto Cruz administration by the Honduran military. Led by General Oswaldo López Arellano, the military overthrow marked the end of the brief interregnum of civilian rule (1971–1972) and continuation of military rule in the country. Due to corruption scandals, López Arellano was ousted from government, being replaced by Colonel Juan Alberto Melgar Castro.

== Background ==
The primary stated motive behind the coup according to military officials, is President Cruz's rejection of the power-sharing agreement between the country's two major parties - the National Party of Honduras (PNH) and Liberal Party of Honduras (PLH) - which "threatened" national stability, justifying the military to intervene and prevent potential political instability from occurring.

Thus, on December 2, 1972, General López Arellano staged a second coup, placing President Cruz under house arrest and assuming leadership once again of the country. In contrast to his previous conservative regime from 1963 to 1970, the new three-man military junta, named the Defense Council, adopted populist policies, such as: agrarian reform which redistributed land to peasants, economic reforms which increased state intervention in the economy, and labor reforms which integrated labour unions into the state's development plans. Political reforms were also implemented, permitting controlled democratization. These reforms aimed to address the concerns of the rural poor and organized labor in order to prevent the rise of revolutionary movements in Honduras.

In April 1975, the López regime was embroiled in a corruption scandal known as Bananagate, where the US multinational United Fruit Co allegedly bribed President Lopez with $1.25 million to reduce the banana export tax, which resulted in the formation of a seven-man commission to investigate the bribery charges. When he was accused of refusing to cooperate with the investigative commission, the Supreme Council of the Armed Forces overthrew him in a bloodless coup, replacing the general with Colonel Melgar Castro on April 22, 1975.
