= Felipe Neri Medina =

President of Honduras from 13 to 15 April 1839

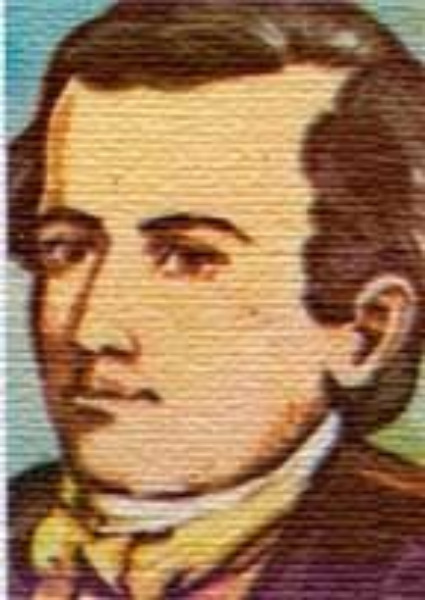

Felipe Neri Medina Valderas y Fernández de Córdova (born 1797) was President of Honduras 13–15 April 1839. His parents were Petrona Idiáquez Cordova and Ignacio Medina Valderas.

He came from a family of wealthy mine owners and Hacienderos. His father served repeatedly as Intendente (prefect) of Danlí. He started school at the Colegio Seminario de Guatemala in 1810 and then studied at the Universidad de San Carlos de Guatemala. He married Dolores Serafin Gomez, in Comayagua, and was a member of the Liberal Party.

After serving as a member of the Constituent Assembly and the Parliament, he was appointed Supreme Director.

On 26 October 1838 Honduras declared itself a separate state under José María Martinez Salinas. Francisco Ferrera sought to separate Honduras from the federal government under Francisco Morazán. On 5 April 1839 Morazán defeated the combined forces of Medina and those of Nicaragua at the Battle of Espiritu Santo in El Salvador. On 25 September 1839, Francisco Ferrera surprised the troops of Honduras at San Pedro, the troops and Medina, wounded in the engagement, fled to Nicaragua.

On 15 April 1839, Medina came back from exile and the Parliament appointed Juan José Alvarado as his successor.

Medina then spent several years in exile in Guatemala.

== See also ==
- List of presidents of Honduras

== Sources ==
- https://www.worldstatesmen.org/Honduras.htm
- German Wikipedia
