= Banana War =

Banana War can refer to:

- Banana Wars, a series of U.S. military interventions in the 1890s
- Bonanno War, a 1960s Mafia dispute, sometimes called "the Banana War"
- a 1974 economic dispute with the Union of Banana Exporting Countries, known as a "banana war"
