= 1881 Honduran presidential election =

Presidential elections were held in Honduras in 1881. The result was a victory for the Liberal candidate, incumbent President Marco Aurelio Soto, who received 82% of the vote.

== Results ==
Candidate	Party	Votes	%
Marco Aurelio Soto	Liberal	24,521	82.30
Other candidates		5,274	17.70
Total		29,795	100.00
Source: Euraque
