= Juan Francisco de Molina =

President of Honduras

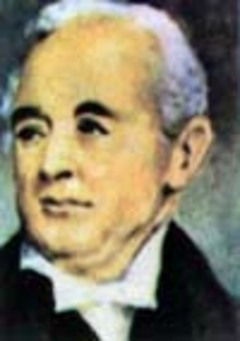
A painting illustrating Juan Francisco de Molina

Juan Francisco de Molina (1779–1878) was the First President of Honduras from January 10 to April 13, 1839.

== Childhood ==
Juan Francisco de Molina was born in 1779 in the city of Tegucigalpa, Honduras. His father was Juan Francisco Molina Esquivel and his mother was Cecilia Solís de Molina.

== Politics and presidency ==
Juan held the position of Counsellor of State and accessed to the position of president on January 10 of 1839 when José Lino Matute, having health problems, retires from it. Just 2 days after being in charge, he signed the approving document of the new constitution of Honduras that left the one of 1825 without validity and that gave the appointment of president to the chief executive.

During his mandate, he celebrated an Offensive Alliance Treaty with Nicaragua against General Francisco Morazán. The army of Honduras was headed by General Francisco Ferrera and the army of Nicaragua was in command of Coronel Bernardo Méndez, but were defeated by Morazán's forces on April 5 of 1839 in the Battle of the Holy Spirit, even though that in it, Morazán and General José Trinidad Cabañas were injured.

After that, in El Salvador they chose Morazán as president, who which took the decision to attack Honduras by the army led by José Trinidad Cabañas, who which later obtained resounding successes in Cuesta Grande and in La Soledad he took the city of Tegucigalpa, causing with this that Juan Francisco de Molina fled to Juticalpa.

He left his presidential duties on April 11, 1839, and was succeeded in office by Felipe Neri Medina, who at that moment held the position of Counsellor of State.

== Death ==
Juan Francisco de Molina died in 1878 at the age of 99 in his hometown.

== See also ==
- List of presidents of Honduras
