= 1883 Honduran presidential election =

Presidential elections were held in Honduras between 9 and 11 November 1883. The result was a victory for Luis Bográn.

== Background ==
President Marco Aurelio Soto resigned from office on 10 March 1883. Although he claimed to be ill, it was considered likely that he was concerned by rumours that Guatemalan president Justo Rufino Barrios was supporting Soto's opponents. Although Soto's resignation was rejected, he was allowed to travel to the United States and Europe, and in May passed power to a Council of Ministers consisting of Bográn, Enrique Gutiérrez Lozano and Rafael Alvarado Manzano. He resigned from office again on 27 August.

Gutiérrez was the favourite to succeed Soto, but died on 11 September during the election campaign.

== Results ==
Candidate	Votes	%
Luis Bográn	40,958	91.99
Céleo Arias	2,942	6.61
Emilio Delgado	536	1.20
Manuel Gamero	88	0.20
Total	44,524	100.00
Source: UCSD

== Aftermath ==
Bográn was inaugurated as president on 30 November.
