= 1877 Honduran general election =

General elections were held in Honduras on 22 and 25 April 1877. In the presidential elections on 22 April, the result was a victory for the Liberal candidate, interim President Marco Aurelio Soto, who received 81% of the vote. Congressional elections were held on 25 April.

== Results ==
=== President ===
Candidate	Party	Votes	%
Marco Aurelio Soto	Liberal	16,603	80.46
Others		4,032	19.54
Total		20,635	100.00
Source: Euraque
