= Salvador Aguirre =

Salvador Aguirre may refer to:

- Salvador Aguirre (film director), Mexican film director of 2002 Cannes Film Festival
- Salvador Aguirre (Honduras) (1862–1947), former President of Honduras
- Salvador Cabrera (born 1973), full name Salvador Cabrera Aguirre, Mexican professional football midfielder
