= 1887 Honduran presidential election =

Presidential elections were held in Honduras on 28 February 1887. The result was a victory for the incumbent president Luis Bográn.

== Background ==
In January Bográn convened a council of notables to discuss a potential successor. Despite stating that he was opposed to the idea of re-election in his opening speech, a majority of the members of the council requested he contest the elections.

Bográn's main opponent was former president Céleo Arias, who was supported by Policarpo Bonilla.

== Results ==
The election was described as "one of the freest, least violent, and perhaps even fairest ballotings in the country's history".

Candidate	Votes	%
Luis Bográn	38,394	86.28
Céleo Arias	5,326	11.97
Others	779	1.75
Total	44,499	100.00
Source: UCSD
