= Justo Herrera =

Honduran politician

Justo José Herrera (born 1789 in Tegucigalpa, death date unknown) was a Honduran politician who served as president from May 28, 1837, to September 3, 1838. He played a part in separating Honduras from the Federal Republic of Central America by approving a Declaration of independence passed by the Assembly of Honduras.

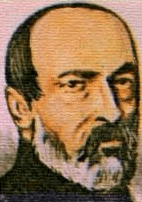

== See also ==
- List of presidents of Honduras
- José María Martinez Salinas
