= Lissette del Cid =

First Lady of Honduras since 2026

First Lady of Honduras
- Incumbent
- Assumed role 27 January 2026
- President: Nasry Asfura
- Preceded by: Manuel Zelaya (as First Gentleman)

Personal details
- Born: Lissette del Cid Fernández Santa Lucía, Intibucá, Honduras
- Spouse: Nasry Asfura (m. 1985)
- Children: 3
- Occupation: Philanthropist

Lissette del Cid Fernández, also known as Lissette de Asfura or Lissette del Cid de Asfura, is a Honduran philanthropist. She is the First Lady of Honduras since 2026 as the wife of Nasry Asfura, President of Honduras.

== Life ==
Del Cid was born in La Esperanza, Honduras.

She and Asfura met on 24 November 1984, and were married on 24 August 1985 and they have three daughters and four granddaughters. Her daughters are Monique, Stephanie and Alexandra Asfura. Although Asfura is one of the country's best-known political figures, Del Cid has kept a low profile and has been part of her husband's presidential election campaign team for 2021 and 2025, and has accompanied him at formal events and some campaign activities.

Del Cid has devoted most of her life to social work and humanitarian organizations in Tegucigalpa. When Asfura became mayor of the capital in 2014, Del Cid focused her efforts on projects supporting women, promoting programs for single mothers, and education and welfare projects for vulnerable children and adolescents.

After the victory of her husband Asfura in the 2025 presidential election, Del Cid became First Lady of Honduras on 27 January 2026 after Asfura was sworn in that day.

Honorary titles
Preceded by Manuel Zelaya as First Gentleman	First Lady of Honduras; 2026–present	Current holder
