= Liberalism in Honduras =

Liberalism in Honduras is a form of Latin American liberalism. It was influenced by French revolutionaries from 1789 to 1799, when the door was open for ideas of positivism. During this time the populace were exposed to liberal ideas such as: liberty, equality, and popular sovereignty, causing enthusiasm for them to be increased.

== Political parties ==
The Liberal Party of Honduras (Partido Liberal de Honduras, or PLH) was founded in 1890 and has both conservative and progressive wings. It is a member of Liberal International and is seen as a traditional center-liberal party. The diversity of the party is reflected in the existence of factions within it.

In contrast to most others in Latin America, the Honduran liberals remained united in one party for much of the movement's history; however, after the 2009 Honduran coup d'état former president Manuel Zelaya, who had been a member of the Liberal Party, and his supporters, many of them former Liberal Party members, split away and formed a new party, Liberty and Refoundation, also known as Libre.

== History ==
In the early years after the region achieved independence from Spain, Honduras was a constituent of the United Provinces of Central America, but its cohesion was undermined by friction between liberals and conservatives. The liberal position was in favor of republicanism, free trade, less centralized government, and above all: the removal of the political and economic powers of the Catholic Church.

The Honduran liberal, Francisco Morazán, became president of the United Provinces in 1830. Morazán enacted many reforms, including freedom of speech, the press, and religion; trial by jury; and others intended to improve equality of socioeconomic status. The reforms were objected to by conservative elements of society, while the separation of Church and State, which allowed for secular marriage, divorce, and an end to government-enforced tithing, made many of the clergy enemies of Morazán and the liberals. This caused the breakup of the Provinces.

Independent Honduras was initially under the control of conservative leaders, this dominance lasting until the liberal Marco Aurelio Soto assumed the presidency on 27 August 1876. He and his Secretary General Ramón Rosa were the principal proponents of liberal reformism in Honduras. In the following period, liberals dominated the country and encouraged foreign investment and economic growth. Soto and his successors were responsible for the reform of the powers of judiciary and church, Professionalization of the armed forces, as well as modernization of communications and education. In this way, they paved the way for Honduras to become a state capable of taking a place on the global stage.

Various liberals held the presidency through to 1903, namely Luis Bográn (1883-1891), Ponciano Leiva (1891-1893), José Policarpo Bonilla Vásquez (1895-1899) and Terencio Esteban Sierra Romero (1899-1903). After this period, liberals ruled the country from 1907-1911 (Miguel Rafael Dávila Cuéllar), 1920-1924 (Rafael López Gutiérrez), and 1929 to 1933 (Vicente Mejía).

After 1933, a period of conservative dictatorial rule started. It was not until 1957 that the liberals would regain power with the democratic election of Ramón Villeda to the presidency. He was deposed by a bloody military coup in 1963, which led to another long period of military rule. This ended with the creation of a constituent assembly and the writing of a new constitution in 1982, elections held in 1981, and the approval of the constitution and democratic election of the liberal Roberto Suazo as president in 1982, all of which restored Honduras as a presidential democracy. Liberals were also elected president in 1985 (José Azcona), 1993 (Carlos Roberto Reina) and 1998 (Carlos Roberto Flores).

== See also ==
- History of Honduras
- Politics of Honduras
