= Ana Arbizú y Flores =

Honduran poet (1825–1903)

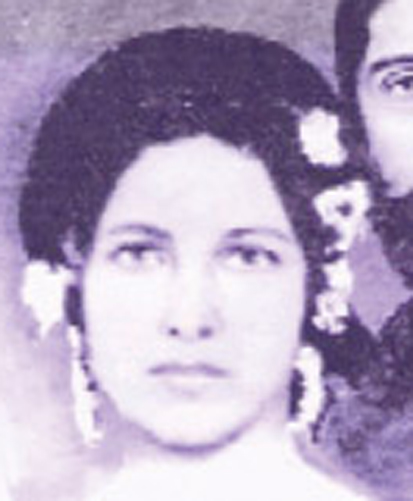

First Lady of Honduras
- In role 17 February 1856 – 11 January 1862
- Preceded by: Severiana Arbizú
- Succeeded by: María Ana Milla Castejón

Personal details
- Born: 21 September 1825 Yuscarán, Honduras
- Died: 30 November 1903 (aged 78) Tegucigalpa, Honduras
- Spouse: José Santos Guardiola

Ana Mateo Arbizú y Flores (21 September 1825 - 30 November 1903), also known as Ana Arbizú de Guardiola, was a Honduran poet, considered the first in her country.

== Biography ==
Ana Mateo Arbizú y Flores was born in Yuscarán on 21 September 1825, the daughter of Calixto Arbizu Vizcaya and Santos Flores. Her first literary work appeared in Tegucigalpa in 1847, made in honor of the death of her father. Another composition appeared in the newspaper La Gaceta in 1865, as a reminder of her daughter Gumersinda.

Arbizú became First Lady of Honduras, since her husband José Santos Guardiola was president of Honduras between 1856 and 1862. According to historian Anarella Véles, she and her husband "made Honduras a better country with a clearer identity by creating the symbols homelands". Due to Guardiola's assassination in 1862, the family had to emigrate from Comayagua, where they were originally from, to the capital, Tegucigalpa.

Arbizú was the mother of Genoveva Guardiola de Estrada Palma and the mother-in-law of Tomás Estrada Palma.
