= José Santos Guardiola =

President of Honduras (1816–1862)

José Santos Guardiola Bustillo
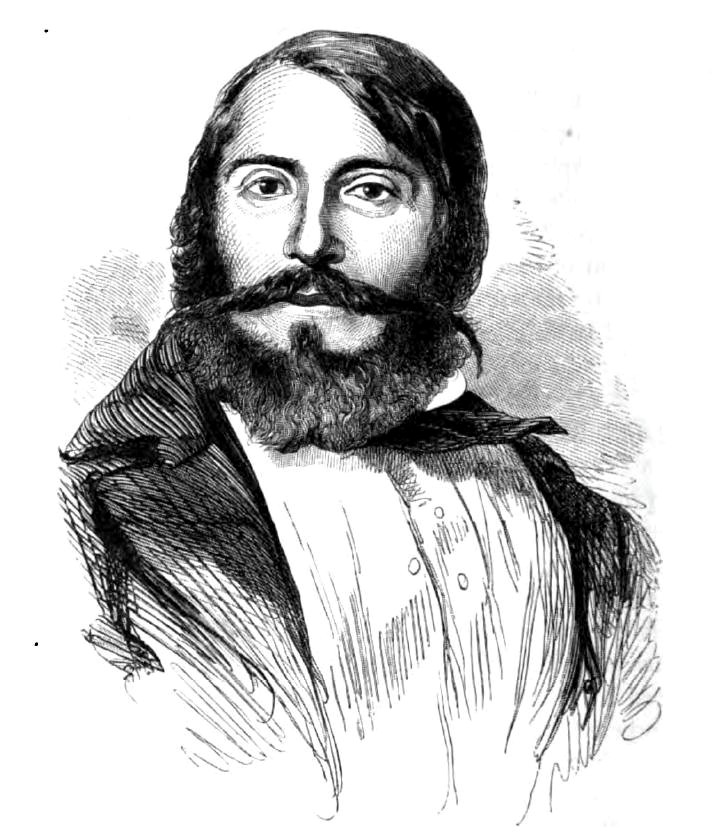

President of Honduras
- In office 17 February 1856 – 11 January 1862
- Vice President: José María Lazo Guillén; Victoriano Castellanos
- Preceded by: Francisco de Aguilar
- Succeeded by: José María Medina

Personal details
- Born: 1 November 1816 Tegucigalpa, Honduras
- Died: 11 January 1862 (aged 45) Comayagua, Honduras
- Party: National Party of Honduras
- Spouse: Ana Arbizú y Flores

José Santos Guardiola Bustillo (1 November 1816 – 11 January 1862) was a two-term President of Honduras. He is the only President of Honduras to be assassinated while in office in a crime committed by his personal guard.

== Early life ==
José Santos Guardiola was born on 1 November 1816 in Tegucigalpa, Honduras. His parents were the Catalan miner Esteban Guardiola and Bibiana Bustillo. He married Ana de Arzibu.

== Presidency ==
For his first term, from 17 February 1856 to 7 February 1860, he was elected president by Congress after the overthrow of Trinidad Cabañas. His second term, from 7 February 1860 to his death, came through the way of free elections in which he won easily. His administration was one of the most liberal in Honduran history, in spite of him belonging to the Conservative Party. His government granted freedom of press, suffrage and movement; it respected and it guaranteed the individual freedom and it regularized the relations between the church and the State. He opposed Francisco Morazán in the conflict over whether to have a Central American state.

His good relations with the British helped facilitate the return of governance of the Bay Islands and the La Mosquitia region into Honduras. He struck a deal with Queen Victoria on which Great Britain recognized the Honduran sovereignty of the aforementioned territories (the treaty of Wyke-Cruz) as long as the inhabitants of the islands were granted freedom of worship. For this the Vicar of Comayagua, Miguel del Cid, enemy of General Guardiola, excommunicated him, but Pope Pius IX overturned it and named Juan de Jesus Zepeda Zepeda as Bishop of Honduras. He fought against William Walker, who organized several private military expeditions into Mexico and Central America with the intention of re-establishing slavery and taking over all of Central America.

== Death ==
On 10 January 1862, Hipólito Zafra Valladares, the head of the presidential guard, was murdered. Pablo Agurcia became the new head and proceeded to change the guards of the president in order to kill him.

The next day, on 11 January 1862, President Guardiola was sleeping with his wife in the presidential palace of Honduras. At around 5 AM he woke up due to a commotion outside his room. He opened the door to see what was happening and was shot by his assassin, a presidential guard. Guardiola died in the arms of his daughter.

=== Aftermath ===
The killer and his accomplices ran away but were captured by general Casto José Alvarado. The provisional president, José María Medina, ordered a court to hear the case and the suspects were sentenced to death.

== Issue ==
One of their many daughters of Guardiola, Genoveva Guardiola Arbizú, married the first President of the Republic of Cuba, Tomás Estrada Palma.

Composer Guadalupe Haertling was among Guardiola's descendants.

== See also ==
- List of presidents of Honduras
