= 1975 Honduran coup d'état =

Coup d'état in Honduras

Date	22 April 1975
Location	Honduras
Status	Oswaldo López Arellano overthrown

Belligerents
(Honduras) Honduran Army; Supported by: United Brands Company	(Honduras) Honduran government

Commanders and leaders
(Honduras) Juan Alberto Melgar Castro	(Honduras) Oswaldo López Arellano

The 1975 Honduran coup d'état took place on 22 April 1975, with Oswaldo López Arellano being ousted in a military coup led by his fellow General Juan Alberto Melgar Castro. The coup was prompted in part by the "Bananagate" scandal, exposed by the U.S. Securities and Exchange Commission in 1975, in which the United Brands Company agreed to bribe President López with US$1.25 million, and the promise of another $1.25 million upon the reduction of certain banana export taxes.
