= 1864 Honduran presidential election =

Presidential elections were held in Honduras on 15 February 1864. The result was a victory for José María Medina.

== Background ==
In 1863 Guatemala invaded Honduras and removed President José Francisco Montes from office. José María Medina, who had travelled with the Guatemalan army, was proclaimed President on 26 June. On 31 December Medina temporarily gave up the presidency to Francisco Inestroza to allow him to contest forthcoming elections.

== Results ==
Candidate	Votes	%
José María Medina	13,056	63.74
Other candidates	7,426	36.26
Total	20,482	100.00
Source: Durón
