= 1874 Honduran presidential election =

Presidential elections were held in Honduras in 1874. The result was a victory for Ponciano Leiva.

== Background ==
A dispute between President Céleo Arias and Salvadoran leader Santiago González led to Arias being forced to resign on 13 January after troops led by General Ponciano Leiva encircled Comayagua, where Arias was staying. Arias was subsequently exiled for five years.

Leiva called a national convention in April, which annulled the 1873 constitution and restored the 1865 document. On 29 April it declared Leiva president. His presidency was later confirmed in a public vote.
