= Miguel Ramón Morales =

Nicaraguan politician

Miguel Ramón Morales (1787–1855) was a Nicaraguan politician and lawyer who served as Acting Supreme Director of Nicaragua from March 12 to April 6, 1847.

As a Senator in the Legislative Assembly, he exercised the Executive Power of Nicaragua on an interim basis due to the conclusion of the term of Supreme Director José León Sandoval.

In the elections held in 1847, José María Guerrero, candidate for Supreme Director, was not elected because he did not have the 2/3 of the votes required by law. In accordance with the provisions of the Constitution for these cases, the Legislative Assembly unanimously appointed Senator Morales as Acting Supreme Director. He exercised the command until April 6 of the same year, the date on which he handed it over to Guerrero, elected as Supreme Director.

At the Constituent Assembly of 1854, with the Fruto Chamorro threading the transfer of the seat of government to Masaya, Morales was a deputy for the district of Matagalpa.

Political offices
Preceded by José León Sandoval	Supreme Director of Nicaragua (acting); 1847	Succeeded by José María Guerrero de Arcos
