= Nora Gúnera de Melgar =

Honduran politician (1942–2021)

Alba Nora Gúnera Osorio (May 1942 – 1 October 2021) was a Honduran politician and wife of General Juan Alberto Melgar Castro, the Honduran military Head of State from 1975 to 1978. After being elected mayor of Tegucigalpa, she ran for president under the National Party in the 1997 elections, but lost to Liberal Party nominee Carlos Roberto Flores Facusse. She served as the 6th vice-president of the National Congress of Honduras during the 2010–2014 legislature.
