= José María Martínez Salinas =

Honduran politician

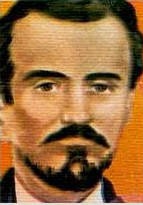

José María Martínez Salinas was an independent Honduran politician who served as the head of state of Honduras from 1 January 1837 to 28 May 1837 as well as from 3 September 1838 to 12 November 1838. He came to power in his second term after Justo José Herrera left office for unknown reasons. Martínez is largely known to be puppet of Francisco Ferrera around this time as well as one of the key players in causing the dissolution and removal of Honduras from the Federal Republic of Central America.

== See also ==
- List of presidents of Honduras
- Francisco Ferrera
- Joaquin Rivera Bragas
- Justo José Herrera
- José Lino Matute
