= Miguel Oquelí Bustillo =

Honduran politician

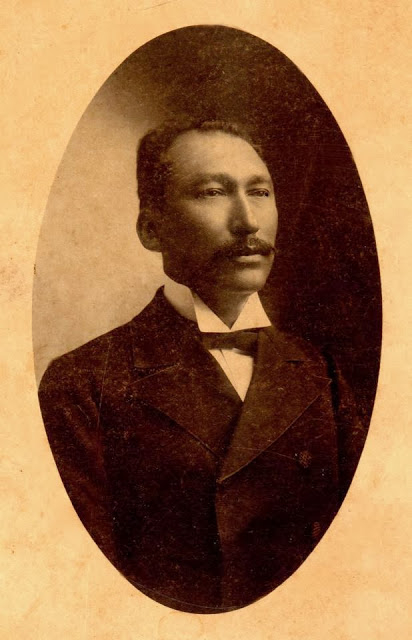

Miguel Oquelí Bustillo (25 February 1856 – 8 April 1938) was President of Honduras for two months (as Chairman of the Provisional Government Junta) 25 February – 18 April 1907.

Oquelí came to power in a revolution backed by José Santos Zelaya and the government of Nicaragua to oust the previous Honduran president, Manuel Bonilla. This action caught the attention of the United States. U.S. forces landed marines at Puerto Cortés to protect the commercial interests of American banana companies. This chain of events led to the 1907 Central American Peace Conference.

He was the president of the National Congress of Honduras in 1923.

== See also ==
- List of presidents of Honduras

Political offices
Preceded by Manuel Bonilla	President of Honduras; 1907	Succeeded by Miguel R. Dávila
