= 1928 Honduran general election =

- 28 October 1928
- Presidential election
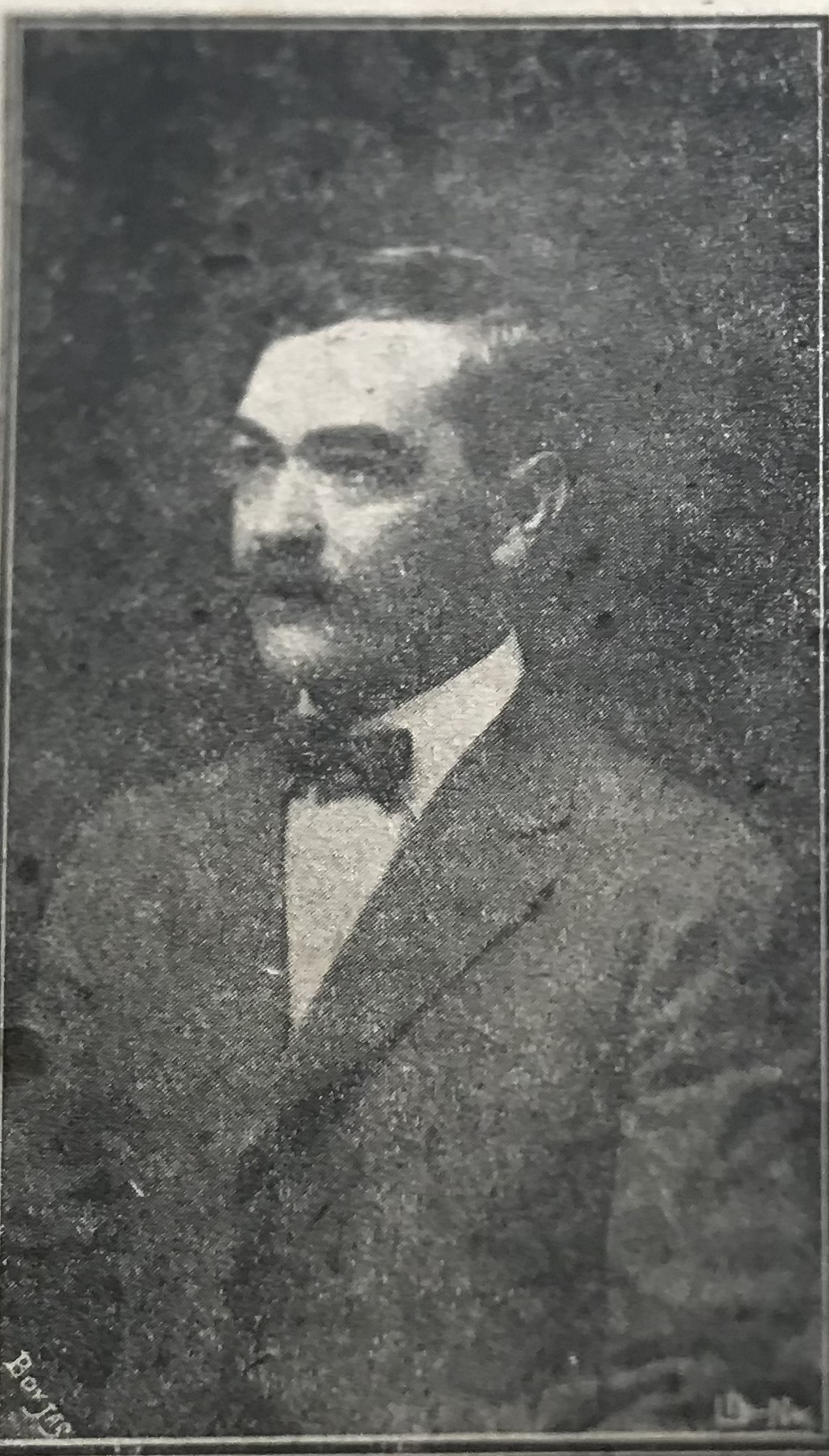

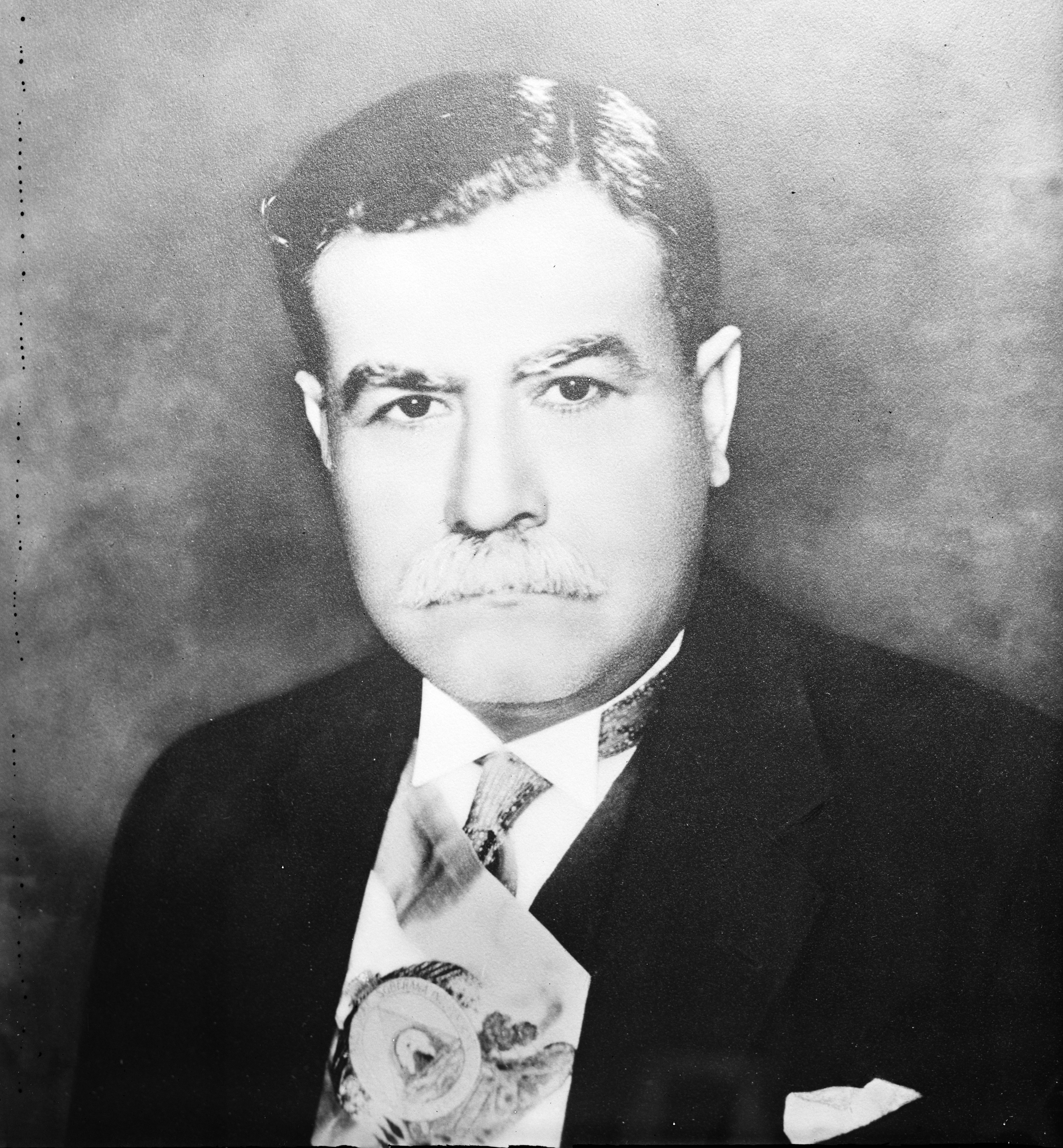
| Nominee | Vicente Mejía Colindres | Tiburcio Carías Andino |
| Party | Liberal | National |
| Popular vote | 62,319 | 47,745 |
| Percentage | 56.62% | 43.38% |
President before election
Miguel Paz Barahona
National
Elected President
Vicente Mejía Colindres
Liberal

General elections were held in Honduras on 28 October 1928. Vicente Mejía Colindres of the Liberal Party was re-elected as president, becoming the first incumbent to be re-elected in peaceful and contested elections.

== Results ==
=== President ===
| Candidate | Party | Votes | % |
|---|---|---|---|
| Vicente Mejía Colindres | Liberal Party | 62,319 | 56.62 |
| Tiburcio Carías Andino | National Party | 47,745 | 43.38 |
| Total | | 110,064 | 100.00 |
Source: Nohlen

=== Congress ===
| Party | Seats | +/– |
|---|---|---|
| National Party | 26 | –10 |
| Liberal Party | 21 | +15 |
| Vacant | 1 | – |
| Total | 48 | +2 |
Source: Political Handbook of the World

== Bibliography ==
- Argueta, Mario. Tiburcio Carías: anatomía de una época, 1923-1948. Tegucigalpa: Editorial Guaymuras. 1989.
- Bardales B., Rafael. Historia del Partido Nacional de Honduras. Tegucigalpa: Servicopiax Editores. 1980.
- Bulmer-Thomas, Victor. “Honduras since 1930.” Bethell, Leslie, ed. 1991. Central America since independence. New York: Cambridge University Press.
- Dodd, Thomas JTiburcio Carías: portrait of a Honduran political leader. Baton Rouge: Louisiana State University Press. . 2005.
- Elections in the Americas A Data Handbook Volume 1. North America, Central America, and the Caribbean. Edited by Dieter Nohlen. 2005.
- Euraque, Darío A. Reinterpreting the banana republic: region and state in Honduras, 1870-1972. Chapel Hill: The University of North Carolina Press. 1996.
- Haggerty, Richard and Richard Millet. “Historical setting.” Merrill, Tim L., ed. 1995. Honduras: a country study. Washington, D.C.: Federal Research Division, Library of Congress.
- Krehm, William. Democracia y tiranias en el Caribe. Buenos Aires: Editorial Parnaso. (First edition in 1947). 1957.
- Morris, James A. Honduras: caudillo politics and military rulers. Boulder: Westview Press. 1984.
- Morris, James A. “Honduras: the burden of survival in Central America.” Central America: crisis and adaptation. 1984. Albuquerque: University of New Mexico Press.
- Political handbook of the world 1929. New York, 1930.
- Stokes, William S. Honduras: an area study in government. Madison: University of Wisconsin Press. 1950.
