= Tiburcio Carías Andino =

President of Honduras (1924, 1933–1949)

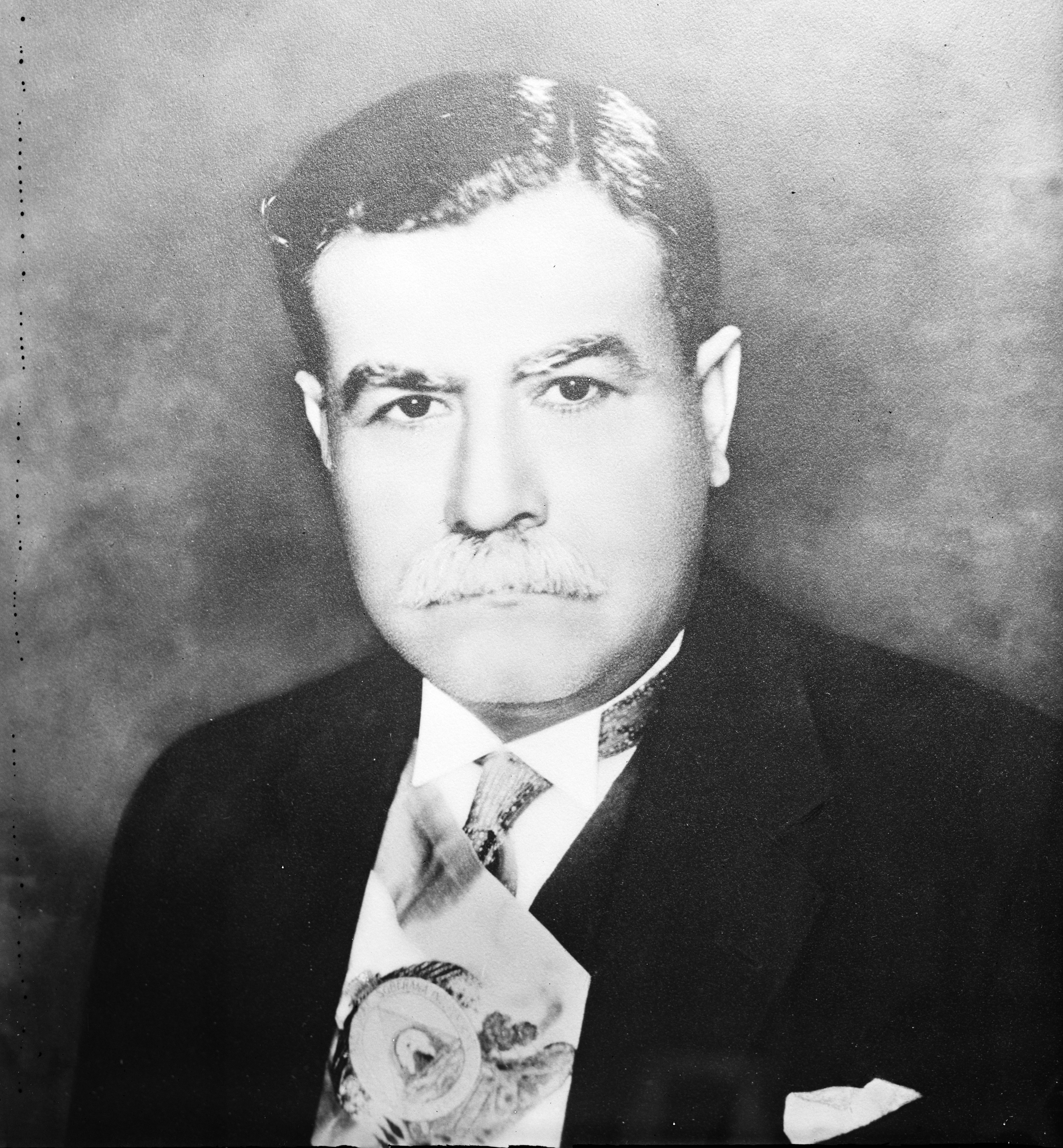
- Carías Andino in 1936

38th President of Honduras
- In office 1 February 1933 – 1 January 1949
- Vice President: Abraham Williams Calderón
- Preceded by: Vicente Mejía Colindres
- Succeeded by: Juan Manuel Gálvez
- In office 27 April 1924 – 30 April 1924
- Preceded by: Francisco Bueso
- Succeeded by: Vicente Tosta

Personal details
- Born: 5 March 1876 Tegucigalpa, Honduras
- Died: 23 December 1969 (aged 93) Tegucigalpa, Honduras
- Party: National Party

Military service
- Branch/service: Honduran Army
- Years of service: 1892–1924
- Rank: Major general

Tiburcio Carías Andino (5 March 1876 – 23 December 1969) was a Honduran politician and military officer with the rank of major general. He served as the 38th president of Honduras, briefly in 1924 as constitutional president and later in the form of a dictatorial regime from 1933 until 1949. He was elected president of Honduras in the midst of the Great Depression. He strengthened the Armed Forces, maintained the support of the banana companies by opposing strikes, strongly aligned its government with that of the United States, and kept the country in strict adherence to debt payments.

== Biography ==
=== Early life ===
Tiburcio Carias Andino was born in the Republic of Honduras on 15 March 1876. His parents were Calixto Carias Galindo and Sara Francisca Andino Rivera. During his childhood Tiburcio Carias Andino is appointed Director of the Boys' School, and professor at the "El Porvenir" institute, where he taught Mathematics classes. After graduating from high school he studied criminal law in the faculty of jurisprudence and political science at the Central University of Honduras. During 15 February 1905. Tiburcio Carias Andino, was part of the Hospital de Occidente Project until the completion of its building. Among the personalities that volunteered to work in the realization of this Hospital Center were: Ramón López Cobos, Ciro Mora, Francisco Bueso Cuéllar, Doctor Filadelfo Bueso, Doctor JJ Jones, Doctor Ramón López Cobos, Doctor Jesús H. Medina, Jerónimo J. Reina, Doctor Vicente Mejía Colindres, Carlos Gauggel, a German citizen, Engineer Manuel Bueso Pineda, Monsignor Emilio Morales Roque, Doctor Julio C. Bueso Cáceres. The Hospital succeeded thanks to activities and economic contributions from both the public and private donors until in 1940 there was a study by the Executive Branch to take charge of health care.

=== Military career ===
In 1907, Carias fought alongside the liberal forces and in the "Battle of Lizapa" he was promoted to General. Miguel R. Dávila Cuéllar assumed the presidency of the republic and appointed Carias, as Governor of the Copán Department, in 1907–1908.

On 5 April 1908, the Society of Craftsmen "El Porvenir" was founded by Carias, who served as its president. The co-founders included Ramón Hernández, Salvador Lara, Benjamín Escobar, Juan Castrillo, Antonio Selva, Abraham Mejía, Coronado Ramírez, José Francisco Urquía Tabora, Francisco Barnica, Andrés Ramírez, Manuel Cartagena, Jeremías Cobos, Pedro Martínez, Atilio Sánchez, Albino Santos, Jesús Erazo, Vicente Vega, Vicente Maldonado, Luciano Casaca, Porfirio Santos, Gregorio Bautista, Ramón Tabora, Maximiliano B. Rosales, Manuel Zepeda, Leopoldo F. Orellana, Manuel Chávez, Federico Castro, Francisco González. On 26 May 1912, the said organization was renamed the Copaneca Workers' Society. In 1912 General Manuel Bonilla Chirinos, assumed the presidency of Honduras for the second time, although with identical ideologies they were adversaries with Carias. in 1914, the candidate of the National Party of Honduras was Francisco Bertrand Barahona and the national writer: Alberto de Jesús Membreño, a position he assumed as provisional between 1915 and 1916, upon the retirement of President Barahona.

Carias would become famous as a military leader during the Honduran civil wars of 1919 and 1924. During this time he would be promoted to the rank of general. During the "vindicating revolution" in 1924 he would lead several military offensives. After the Second Civil War had the presidency of Honduras for a very short time, however General Carias Andino would be appointed as "Chief of the revolution" would assume for the second time the brief power between 24 March to 28 April 1924.

Paralero to this Fausto Dávila former minister of the López Gutiérrez government, he would continue with the administration for a week. Later, on the cruise ship "USS Denver" negotiations began between the revolutionaries and the government, after which General Vicente Tosta Carrasco was appointed Provisional President, under whose regime General Gregorio Ferrera took up arms. Once the civil wars were over, he already had a great military experience on the battlefield, this led to an important position in the government of Honduras, he would run for president of Honduras for the rest of the decade without any victory, although that would not stop him from trying to reach power.

== Becoming president ==
Carías became a general during the Second Civil War in 1924. In the 1923 elections, Carías was a candidate for the National Party against the divided Liberals, but only won a plurality of the vote. The resulting deadlock was followed by disturbances, and elections the following year saw Miguel Paz Barahona of the National Party elected, although Carías was able to exercise a degree of influence during Barahona's presidency. In 1928, Carías was the National Party's candidate but lost to Vicente Mejía Colindres of the Liberal Party. He accepted the result, as the election had been comparatively free and fair, marking a then-rare peaceful transfer of power between the two major parties. He was the President of National Congress of Honduras from 1926 to 1929, and from 1930 to 1931.

On 1 February 1933 he became President of Honduras again, this time for 16 years. Despite growing unrest and severe economic strains, the 1932 Honduran presidential elections were relatively peaceful and fair. The peaceful transition of power was surprising because the onset of the Great Depression had led to the overthrow of governments elsewhere throughout Latin America, in nations with much stronger democratic traditions than those of Honduras. Vicente Mejía, however, resisted pressure from his own party to manipulate the results to favor the Liberal party candidate, José Ángel Zúñiga Huete. As a result, the National Party candidate, Carías, won the election by a margin of some 20,000 votes. On 16 November 1932, Carías assumed office, beginning what was to be the longest period of continuous rule by an individual in Honduran history.

Lacking, however, was any immediate indication that the Carías administration was destined to survive any longer than most of its predecessors. Shortly before Carías's inauguration, dissident Liberals, despite the opposition of Vicente Mejía, had risen in revolt. Carías had taken command of the government forces, obtained arms from El Salvador, and crushed the uprising in short order. Most of Carías's first term in office was devoted to efforts to avoid financial collapse, improve the military, engage in a limited program of road building, and lay the foundations for prolonging his own hold on power.

== 1930s ==
The economic situation remained extremely bad throughout the 1930s. In addition to the dramatic drop in banana exports caused by the Great Depression, the fruit industry was further threatened by the outbreak in 1935 of epidemics of Panama disease and Black sigatoka in the banana-producing areas. Within a year, most of the country's production was threatened. Large areas, including most of those around Trujillo were abandoned, and thousands of Hondurans were thrown out of work. By 1937 a means of controlling the disease had been found, but many of the affected areas remained out of production because a significant share of the market formerly held by Honduras had shifted to other nations.

Carías had made efforts to improve the military even before he became president. Once in office, both his capacity and his motivation to continue and to expand such improvements increased. He gave special attention to the fledgling air force, founding the Military Aviation School in 1934 and arranging for a United States colonel to serve as its commandant.

As months passed, Carías moved slowly but steadily to strengthen his hold on power. He gained the support of the banana companies through opposition to strikes and other labor disturbances. He strengthened his position with domestic and foreign financial circles through conservative economic policies. Even in the height of the depression, he continued to make regular payments on the Honduran debt, adhering strictly to the terms of the arrangement with the British bondholders and also satisfying other creditors. Two small loans were paid off completely in 1935.

=== Increase in political power ===
In 1935, political controls were instituted slowly under Carías. The Communist Party of Honduras (Partido Comunista de Honduras—PCH) was outlawed, but the Liberal Party continued to function, and even the leaders of a small uprising in 1935 were later offered free air transportation should they wish to return to Honduras from their exile abroad. At the end of 1935, however, stressing the need for peace and internal order, Carías began to crack down on the opposition press and political activities. Meanwhile, the National Party, at the president's direction, began a propaganda campaign stressing that only the continuance of Carías in office could give the nation continued peace and order. The constitution, however, prohibited immediate reelection of presidents.

The method chosen by Carías to extend his term of office was to call a constituent assembly that would write a new constitution and select the individual to serve for the first presidential term under that document. Except for the president's desire to perpetuate himself in office, there seemed little reason to alter the nation's basic charter. Earlier constituent assemblies had written thirteen constitutions (only ten of which had entered into force), and the latest had been adopted in 1924. The handpicked Constituent Assembly of 1936 incorporated thirty of the articles of the 1924 document into the 1936 constitution. The major changes were the elimination of the prohibition on immediate reelection of a president and vice president and the extension of the presidential term from four to six years. Other changes included restoration of the death penalty, reductions in the powers of the legislature, and denial of citizenship and therefore the right to vote to women. Finally, the new constitution included an article specifying that the incumbent president and vice president would remain in office until 1943. But Carías, by then a virtual dictator, wanted even more, so in 1939 the legislature, now completely controlled by the National Party, obediently extended his term in office by another six years (to 1949).

The Liberals and other opponents of the government reacted to these changes by attempting to overthrow Carías. Numerous efforts were made in 1936 and 1937, but all were successful only in further weakening the National Party's opponents. By the end of the 1930s, the National Party was the only organized functioning political party in the nation. Numerous opposition leaders had been imprisoned, and some had reportedly been chained and put to work in the streets of Tegucigalpa. Others, including the leader of the Liberal Party, Ángel Zúñiga, had fled into exile.

During his presidency, Carías cultivated close relations with his fellow Central American dictators, generals Jorge Ubico in Guatemala, Maximiliano Hernández in El Salvador, and Anastasio Somoza in Nicaragua. Relations were particularly close with Ubico, who helped Carías reorganize his secret police and also captured and shot the leader of a Honduran uprising who had made the mistake of crossing into Guatemalan territory. Relations with Nicaragua were somewhat more strained as a result of the continuing border dispute, but Carías and Somoza managed to keep this dispute under control throughout the 1930s and 1940s.

=== Begin of El Cariato regime ===
Political control was institutionalized little by little under the command of Carías, there was a great anti-communist campaign and therefore the Communist Party of Honduras was declared illegal, but the Liberal Party continued to function and the leaders of the 1935 revolt, who were asylum seekers. Abroad, they were offered free passages to return to the country by means of air flights if they so wished, however by the end of 1935, trying to appease the political activities against their government and maintain the internal peace of the country, brutally repressed and censored newspapers, journalists, and political leaders.

The regime of the Cariato was characterized as a highly nationalistic and militaristic dictatorship, where the ideal of the Honduran model citizen was exacerbated. It is known that General Carias was a sympathizer of fascism and had admiration for Fascist Italy and Nazi Germany, to the extent that both regimes served as patrons for his government from 1938 onwards. Carias was not shy about sending letters to Adolf Hitler after the establishment of diplomatic relations between the Reich and the Republic of Honduras were normalized in 1936. In the same way he did to the Japanese emperor Hirohito in 1937. Similar to fascist movements in the European context, Carias sought to create a national identity based on a mythical and idealized past, in this case extolling the Honduran mestizo identity as heir people of the Mayan civilization. As a result, during his government the excavations of the cities of Copán and El Puente began.

== 1940s ==
Despite the fact that the general maintained diplomatic relations with Nazi Germany, Fascist Italy, and the Empire of Japan, he had to declare war on the Axis after the attack on Pearl Harbor in 1941. Thus, Honduras was known as one of the Latin American countries allied to the United States of America. In 1941 after the Japanese attack on the US bases stationed in Pearl Harbor, the northern country declared war on the "German-Italian-Japanese Axis", as would its Honduran friend, who also contributed soldiers and marines to the ranks, also the Honduran Air Force patrolled the coasts of the Caribbean Sea near Mexico in search of German submarines; Apart from this, the Doctor and General Carías Andino "did not tremble" to expel the German consul Christian Zinsser from Honduras, considering him "the fifth column in Central America and with ties to the Gestapo". The value of the ties between the Carías government and nearby dictatorial regimes became somewhat questionable in 1944 when popular revolts in Guatemala and El Salvador deposed Ubico and Hernández. For a time, it seemed as if revolutionary contagion might spread to Honduras as well. A plot, involving some military officers as well as opposition civilians, had already been discovered and crushed in late 1943. In May 1944, a group of women began demonstrating outside of the Presidential Palace in Tegucigalpa, demanding the release of political prisoners. Despite strong government measures, tension continued to grow and Carías was ultimately forced to release some prisoners. This gesture failed to satisfy the opposition and anti-government demonstrations continued to spread. In July several demonstrators were killed by troops in San Pedro Sula. In October a group of exiles invaded Honduras from El Salvador but were unsuccessful in their efforts to topple the government. The military remained loyal and Carías continued in office.

Eager to curb further disorders in the region, the United States began to urge Carías to step aside and allow free elections when his current term in office expired. Carías, who by then was in his early seventies, ultimately yielded to these pressures and announced October 1948 elections, in which he would refrain from being a candidate. He continued, however, to find ways to use his power. The National Party nominated Carías's choice for president, Juan Manuel Gálvez, who had been minister of war since 1933. Exiled opposition figures were allowed to return to Honduras, and the Liberals, trying to overcome years of inactivity and division, nominated Ángel Zúñiga, the same individual whom Carías had defeated in 1932. The Liberals rapidly became convinced that they had no chance to win and, charging the government with manipulation of the electoral process, boycotted the elections. This act gave Gálvez a virtually unopposed victory, and in January 1949 he assumed the presidency.

In 1954, the incumbent President Gálvez had intended to step aside and allow a free and fair contest. Carías intended to return to the presidency, but his candidacy caused a split in the ruling National Party. The Liberal candidate Ramón Villeda Morales won a plurality, but short of a majority (a result echoing the elections of 1902 and 1923), resulting in a deadlock. Vice President Julio Lozano Díaz seized power in a coup, abruptly ending three decades of stable government in Honduras, of which Carías had been president for 16 of those years.

== Crimes ==
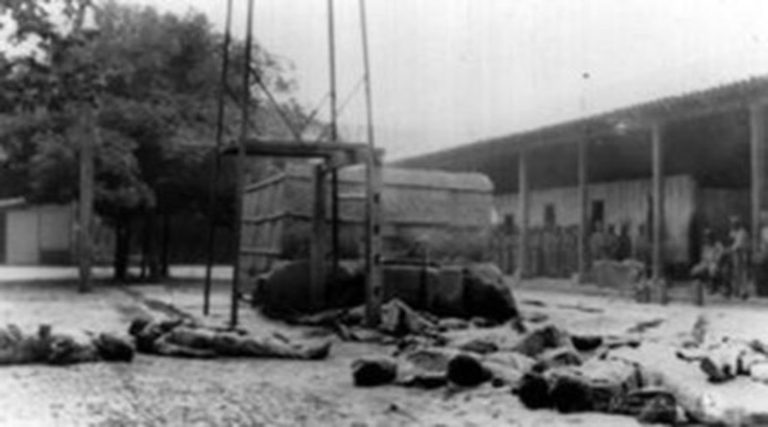
Corpses from the 1944 massacre.

The dictatorship of General Carias Andino, like other regimes in Latin America, was not exempt from having several human rights violations in its history. El Cariato was characterized mainly by heavy censorship in the media as the government supervised the press and radio and brutality against unarmed civilians by the armed forces. One of the ethnic groups most affected by the policies imposed during this period was the Garífuna community, being constantly silenced and attacked by the military forces. The Tela massacre that occurred in 1937 against the Garífuna population, ordered by Carías himself, stands out. Another highly remembered crime was the so-called "San Pedro Sula massacre" that occurred on 6 July 1944, after the military forces repressed unarmed citizens of San Pedro with acts of brutality who had started a protest in the streets of the city demanding their resignation. More than 70 deaths were registered and a still unknown number of hundreds of wounded by military repression, among them the elderly and women.

Another aspect was the torture at the hands of the military in the different prisons to prisoners, most of whom were political opponents, who became saturated with prisoners at one point during his mandate. Many of the workers in the plantations and mines lived in subhuman conditions with little electricity, water or enough food and their work was a condition of near slavery and more than plantation centers and miners they were more similar to concentration camps or forced labor. as some prisoners were also sent to these areas to work as an alternative option instead of staying in penal centers. Also, much of the country's infrastructure was built with the labor of prisoners, mostly political and civil opponents.

== Legacy ==
Evaluating the Carías presidency is a difficult task. His tenure in office provided the nation with a badly needed period of relative peace and order. The country's fiscal situation improved steadily, education improved slightly, the road network expanded, and the armed forces were modernized. At the same time, nascent democratic institutions withered, opposition and labor activities were suppressed and national interests at times were sacrificed to benefit supporters and relatives of Carías or major foreign interests.

The Chelato Uclés National Stadium in Tegucigalpa previously bore Carías' name prior to renaming in 2022. The stadium, opened in 1948, was built by the Carías administration.

== Electoral history ==
Year	Office	Party	Votes			Result	Ref.
Year	Office	Party	Total	%	P.	Result	Ref.
1923	President	National Party	49,541	47.1	1st	Annulled	
1928	President	National Party	47,745	42.4	2nd	Lost	
1932	President	National Party	81,211	?	1st	Won	
1954	President	National Party	77,726	30.8	2nd	Lost	

== See also ==
- History of Honduras
- History of Honduras (1932–1982)

Political offices
Preceded by General Francisco Bueso; Acting	President of Honduras as First Chief of the Liberating Revolution; 1924	Succeeded by Vicente Tosta; Provisional
Preceded by Vicente Mejía Colindres	President of Honduras; 1933–1949	Succeeded by Juan Manuel Gálvez
