= Victoriano Castellanos =

Victoriano Castellanos Cortés
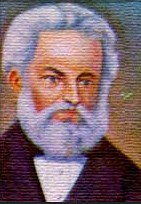
- Born: March 23, 1796; Los Llanos de Santa Rosa
- Died: December 11, 1862
- Occupation: President of Honduras

Victoriano Castellanos Cortes (1795–1862) was President of Honduras from 4 February 1862 to 4 December 1862.

== Biography ==
Victoriano Castellanos Corte was born in Santa Rosa de Copan on 23 March 1795. He was educated by the Catholic parish priest Pedro Antonio Pineda, and worked as a miner before becoming a politician.

On 3 February 1860, he was elected Vice President of Honduras, the president being the General Jose Santos Guardiola, who was killed in Comayagua on 11 January 1862 by his own Presidential Guard. Mr. Victoriano became the provisional president of the nation on February 4 of that year, in the town of Guarita, today part of the Department of Lempira. When returning from traveling in the Republic of El Salvador, he transferred the capital of the Honduras from Comaguya to Santa Rosa. The Government House was situated on the opposite corner of the Central Market, on the North side. After some time passed as president, he decided to move the capital back to Comayagua.

In addition to Decree No. 3 in which it is ordered that the nation should be called "Republic of Honduras" instead of the State of Honduras, he also signed other decrees which created the Department of Islas de la Bahia (Bay Islands). He ordered the construction of schools in the cities of Danli and another in Tegucigalpa.

Castellanos died on 11 December 1862 in Comayagua.
