= Francisco Inestroza =

President of Honduras

Francisco Inestroza (1810 – ) was President of Honduras from 31 December 1863 – 15 February 1864.

He served as Vice President of Honduras in the cabinet of José María Medina from June 1863 to December 1863.

== See also ==
- List of presidents of Honduras
