= 1866 Honduran presidential election =

Presidential elections were held in Honduras in January 1866. The result was a victory for José María Medina.

== Results ==
Medina won the popular vote, and was subsequently appointed president by Congress.
