= 1923 Honduran general election =

General elections were held in Honduras between 27 and 29 October 1923. Tiburcio Carías Andino received the highest number of votes, with 47% of the ballots cast. However, as no candidate had received an absolute majority in the public vote, Congress would vote on the candidates. However, Congress did not meet again until 1 January the following year. In December President Rafael López Gutiérrez declared a state of siege, suspended the constitution, and announced that he would remain in office in order to keep the peace. Although Congress was dominated by the two liberal parties, they did not want Carías, but also could not agree on a common candidate.

As a result, Carías started a civil war in February, known as the War of Revindication. López Gutiérrez lost the support of his party in several provinces. Scattered fighting took place over two months, with 400 American marines occupying Tegucigalpa.

== Background ==
In April 1923 Carías was selected by the National Party's Central Committee as the party's candidate for president, with Miguel Paz Barahona as his running mate.

== Results ==
=== President ===
| Candidate | Party | Votes | % |
|---|---|---|---|
| Tiburcio Carías Andino | National Party | 49,541 | 47.13 |
| Policarpo Bonilla | Liberal Constitutionalist Party | 35,160 | 33.45 |
| Juan Ángel Arias Boquín | Liberal Party | 20,424 | 19.43 |
| Total | | 105,125 | 100.00 |
Source: Nohlen

=== Congress ===
| Party | Seats |
|---|---|
| Liberal Constitutionalist Party | 18 |
| National Party | 15 |
| Liberal Party | 9 |
| Total | 42 |
Source: UCSD

== Bibliography ==
- Argueta, Mario. Tiburcio Carías: anatomía de una época, 1923–1948. Tegucigalpa: Editorial Guaymuras. 1989.
- Argueta, Mario. “El ascenso de Tiburcio Carías Andino.” Revista política de Honduras 4:77-121 (April 1999).
- Bardales B., Rafael. Historia del Partido Nacional de Honduras. Tegucigalpa: Servicopiax Editores. 1980.
- Bulmer-Thomas, Victor. “Honduras since 1930.” Bethell, Leslie, ed. 1991. Central America since independence. New York: Cambridge University Press.
- García Laguardia, Jorge Mario. Honduras: evolución político constitucional 1824–1936. México: Universidad Nacional Autónoma de México, Corte de Constitucionalidad de Guatemala. 1999.
- Mahoney, James. The legacies of liberalism: path dependence and political regimes in Central America. Baltimore: Johns Hopkins University Press. 2001.
- Mariñas Otero, Luis. “La evolución del estado liberal: de la guerra civil a la crisis del 30.” Yankelevich, Pablo, ed. 1990. Honduras. México: Instituto de Investigaciones Dr. José María Mora, Universidad de Guadalajara, Nueva Imagen.
- Martz, John D. Central America, the crisis and the challenge. Chapel Hill: University of North Carolina Press. 1959.
- Morris, James A. Honduras: caudillo politics and military rulers. Boulder: Westview Press. 1984.
- Paredes, Lucas. Drama político de Honduras. México: Editora Latinoamericana, S.A. 1958.
