= José Jeronimo Zelaya =

Honduran politician

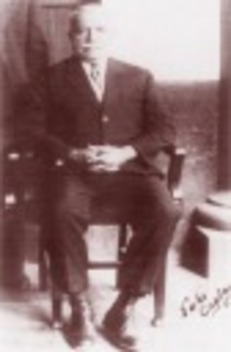
Photo of Zelaya taken in the 1860s

José Jeronimo Zelaya was a conservative Honduran politician that was president of Honduras that was elected in 1827 by popular vote. However, his administration was only recognized by the department of Santa Barbara. He was only in office for a period of three months.

== See also ==
- List of presidents of Honduras
