= Juan Alberto Melgar Castro =

Honduran military officer and politician

General Juan Alberto Melgar Castro

27th President of Honduras
- In office 22 April 1975 – 7 August 1978
- Preceded by: Oswaldo López Arellano
- Succeeded by: Policarpo Paz García

Personal details
- Born: Juan Alberto Melgar Castro Marcala, Honduras
- Died: 2 December 1987 (aged 48–49) San Pedro Sula, Honduras
- Party: National Party of Honduras
- Spouse: Nora Gúnera de Melgar
- Profession: Military, Politician

Juan Alberto Melgar Castro (1938 – 2 December 1987) was an army officer in the Honduran military who served as the head of state of Honduras from 22 April 1975 to 7 August 1978, when he was removed from power by others in the military.

== Early life ==
Juan Alberto Melgar Castro was born in 1938. He rose to the rank of colonel in the Armed Forces of Honduras and became minister of interior in the government of President Oswaldo López Arellano in 1972, after the overthrow of civilian rule by the military.

== Presidency ==
Colonel Melgar Castro was appointed head of the military on 31 March 1975 by the Council of the Armed Forces (Consejo Superior de las Fuerzas Armadas, CONSUFFAA) while López was out of the country. The following month López was forced to resign as a result of a bribery scandal involving the United Fruit Company who wanted him to lower export taxes on bananas. In the 1975 Honduran coup d'état CONSUFFAA appointed Melgar Castro as head of state. He was succeeded as head of the military by Colonel Policarpo Paz García.

Melgar Castro's administration was collective in nature, ruling alongside CONSUFFAA as the first among equals. Melgar Castro was associated with the National Party of Honduras and had conservative views. The impetus of the land reform was still strong though and it continued under the Instituto Nacional Agrario until the resignation of its head, Melgar Castro appointee Sandoval Corea in 1977.

In 1976 Melgar Castro established a Presidential Advisory Council on returning the country to civilian rule, a prospect that had divided support among the military. Allegations of corruption and illegal activities by government officials provided justification for further military intervention and Melgar Castro was deposed by CONSUFFAA on 7 August 1978, to be replaced by a triumvirate led by Paz García.

== Later life ==
Melgar Castro remained active in politics and sought to be elected as head of the National Party in 1982.

His wife Nora Gúnera de Melgar was Mayor of Tegucigalpa. She was the nominee of the National Party (Partido Nacional) for President of Honduras in 1997, but lost to the Liberal Party nominee, Carlos Roberto Flores who won 53% of the vote.

General Melgar Castro died of a heart attack near San Pedro Sula on 2 December 1987.

Political offices
Preceded by Oswaldo López; Head of State	President of Honduras; 1975–1978	Succeeded by Policarpo Paz; Provisional
