= Salvador Aguirre (Honduras) =

Acting President of Honduras in 1919

Salvador Aguirre (1862–1947) was acting President of Honduras for one week, from 9 through 16 September 1919.

In early 1919, Honduran president Francisco Bertrand Barahona was facing the end of his presidency. He attempted to transfer power to his brother-in-law, Nazario Soriano, which precipitated a revolt. When it became clear that the rebels would win, Bertrand Barahona resigned and Aguirre took power as an interim leader. He was succeeded by Vicente Mejía Colindres, who had previously served as Minister of the Government.

Political offices
Preceded by Francisco Bertrand	President of Honduras; 1919	Succeeded by Vicente Mejía Colindres
