= José María Medina =

President of Honduras (1863, 1864–72, 1876)

José María Medina Castejón
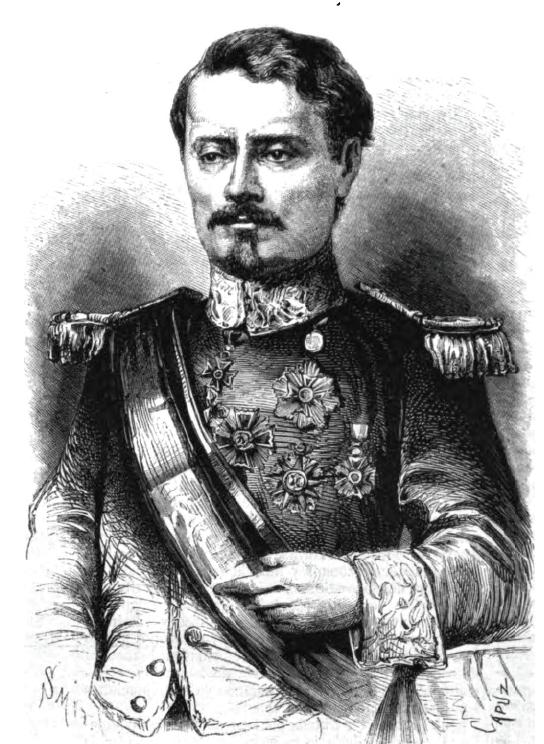

8th President of Honduras
- In office 12 August 1876 – 27 August 1876
- Preceded by: Crescencio Gómez
- Succeeded by: Marco Aurelio Soto
- In office 15 March 1864 – 26 July 1872
- Vice President: Florencio Xatruch; Juan Francisco López Aguirre; Crescencio Gómez
- Preceded by: Francisco Cruz Castro
- Succeeded by: Céleo Arias
- In office 7 September 1863 – 31 December 1863
- Vice President: Francisco Inestroza
- Preceded by: José Francisco Montes
- Succeeded by: Francisco Inestroza

Personal details
- Born: 8 September 1826 Sensenti, Honduras, Federal Republic of Central America
- Died: 1878 (aged 51–52)

José María Medina Castejón (8 September 1826 – 1878) served as the President of Honduras three times during the 1860s and 1870s. Medina was born in Sensenti. While his father is not known, his mother's name was Antonia Medina Castejón.

== Military service ==
At the age of 18, Medina joined the Honduran Army, and in the same year of 1844, fought in Nicaragua as a junior officer against William Walker's attempts to conquer Central America. In 1850, José was appointed the Commander of Arms in Omoa. He assisted General Juan López's rebellion against General Cabañas Fiallos in 1855 and in the same year was defeated by General Mariano Álvarez at Siguatepeque. He served as an Official member of the Central American Joint Chiefs of Staff from July 1856 to May 1857.

== Presidency ==
His first term in office was served as a temporary Acting President between 1 September and 31 December 1863. Medina was then elected President in 1864. According to the 1848 constitution, he was eligible for a second term in office. However, in 1865, he convened a Constitutional Convention, which adopted a new constitution on 18 September. This restricted the President to a single term in office, as well as making the National Congress unicameral. The Convention made Medina the provisional President, which was confirmed in a December 1865 election.

In order to win a second term after the adoption of the new constitution. He convened a new Convention, which approved the changes to the constitution and also elected him President for a second term. However, following protests, he held a referendum on the issue, which was approved by over 95% of voters. However, on 26 July 1872, he was ousted from power after a revolt by the Liberals.

He provisionally served a third time between 12 and 27 August 1876, and was later arrested for treason and executed by firing squad in 1878 in Santa Rosa de Copán.
