= Juan José Alvarado =

Honduran politician (1798–1857)

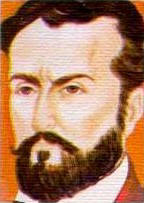
Alvarado

Juan José Alvarado (1798–1857) was Supreme Director of Honduras from 15 April 1839 to 27 April 1839.

Alvarado was born in Ciudad de la Esperanza, Intibucá, but later lived in Gracias a Dios in the department of Lempira, where he worked as a surveyor. There he became a judge of first instance and Jefe Político of Gracias.

He was a member of the Constituent Assembly and was elected President of this Parliament. On 26 October 1838 under the provincial government of José María Martinez Salinas, the province of Honduras had declared itself a separate state. Francisco Ferrera led the party of the federal government under Francisco Morazán and resisted the separation. On 5 April 1839 his troops were defeated by Nicaragua and to the troops of Morazán in the battle of Espiritu Santo in El Salvador. On 25 September 1839, at San Pedro Perulapán, the troops of Honduras surprised Francisco Ferrera, who was wounded and fled to Nicaragua.

Although Alvarado stated that he withdrew for reasons of health, the political and military pressure from Morazán contributed to it. He died in Gracias.

== Sources ==
- http://www.worldstatesmen.org/Honduras.htm
- German Wikipedia
