= Vicente Mejía Colindres =

President of Honduras in 1919, from 1929 to 1933

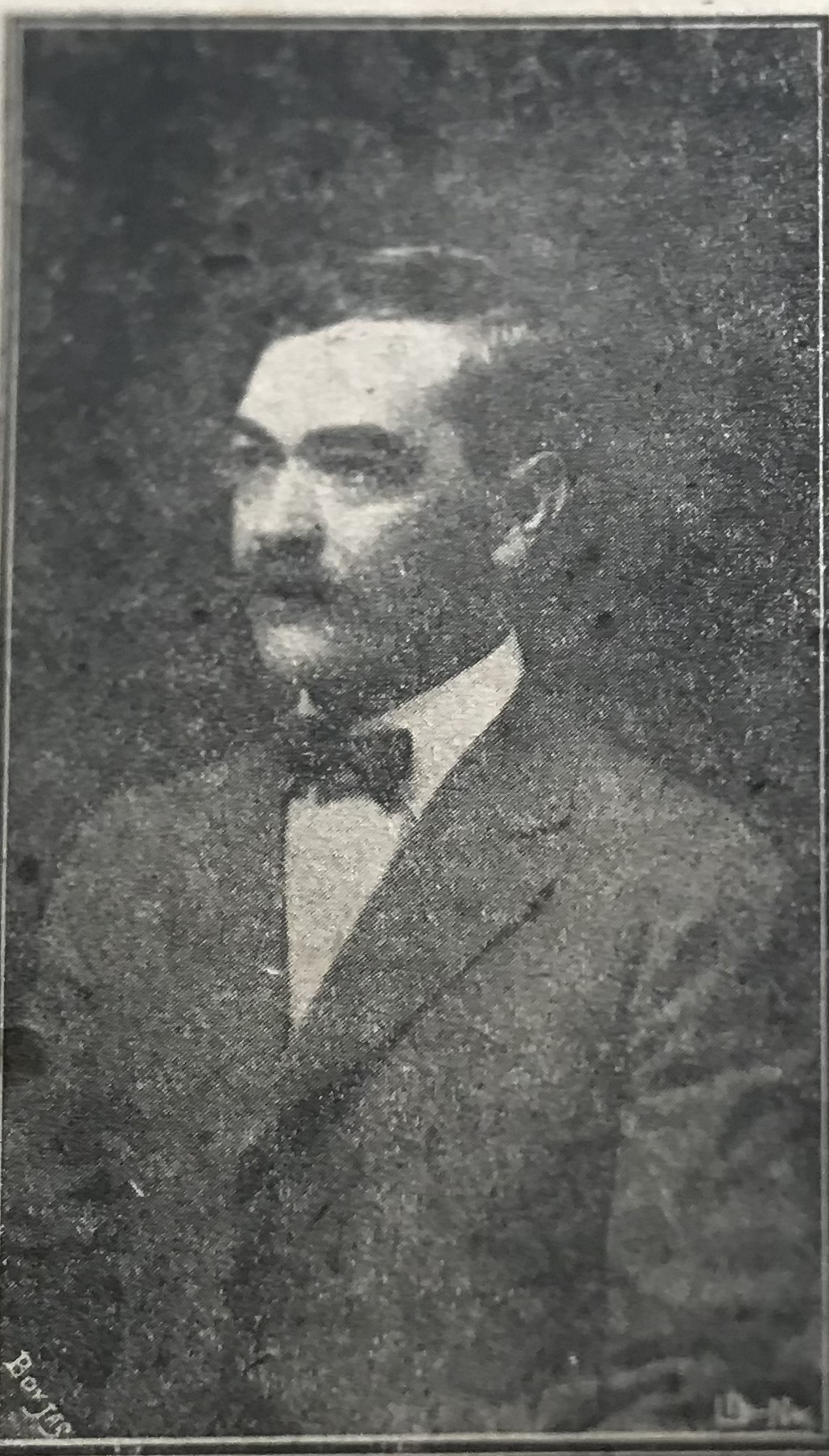
- Photograph of Mejía

20th President of Honduras
- In office 1 February 1929 – 1 February 1933
- Vice President: Rafael Díaz Chávez
- Preceded by: Miguel Paz Barahona
- Succeeded by: Tiburcio Carías Andino

Provisional President of Honduras Interim
- In office 16 September – 5 October 1919
- Preceded by: Salvador Aguirre
- Succeeded by: Francisco Bográn

Personal details
- Born: Vicente Mejía Colindres; 6 April 1878 La Esperanza, Intibucá, Honduras
- Died: 24 August 1966 (aged 88) Tegucigalpa, Honduras
- Party: Liberal Party of Honduras
- Spouse: Rosina de Mejía Colindres
- Education: Universidad Nacional Autónoma de Honduras
- Profession: Physician, politician

Vicente Mejía Colindres (6 April 1878 – 24 August 1966) was President of Honduras between 16 September and 5 October 1919; and again between 1 February 1929 and 1 February 1933.

A successful beginning to his presidency was dampened by the effects of the 1929 economic depression. He had been democratically elected in the 1928 elections that saw an almost unprecedented peaceful transfer of power from the incumbent to an opposition party, and the same was to occur in 1932 when Tiburcio Carías Andino won and succeeded him. He died on 24 August 1966 in Tegucigalpa, Honduras.

== See also ==
- List of presidents of Honduras

== Notes ==
Political offices
Preceded by Salvador Aguirre; Acting	President of Honduras; 1919–1919	Succeeded by Francisco Bográn; Acting
Preceded by Miguel Paz Barahona	President of Honduras; 1929–1933	Succeeded by Tiburcio Carías Andino
