= José Lino Matute =

Honduran politician

José Lino Matute served as the acting president of Honduras from 12 November 1838 until 10 January 1839. He was essentially the last president of Honduras when it was part of the Federal Republic of Central America, however his successor Juan Francisco de Molina held office for about a day before Honduras officially became independent.
