= Oswaldo López Arellano =

President of Honduras from 1963–71 and 1972–75

Oswaldo López
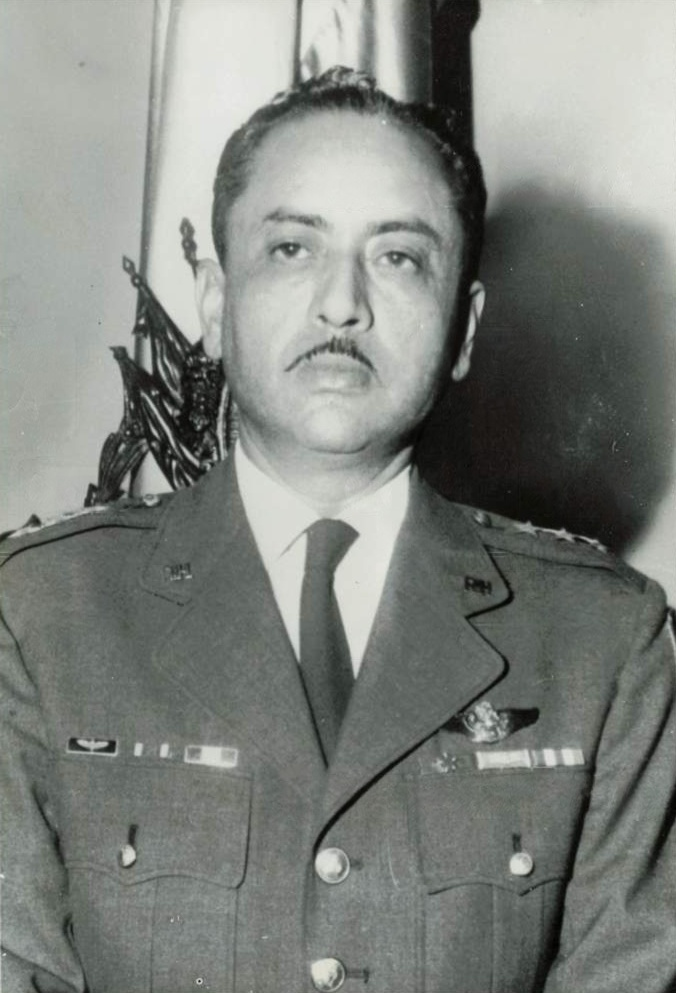
- López Arellano in 1965

25th President of Honduras
- In office 4 December 1972 – 22 April 1975
- Preceded by: Ramón Ernesto Cruz
- Succeeded by: Juan Alberto Melgar
- In office 3 October 1963 – 7 June 1971
- Vice President: Ricardo Zúñiga Agustinus
- Preceded by: Ramón Villeda
- Succeeded by: Ramón Ernesto Cruz

Personal details
- Born: Oswaldo Enrique López Arellano; 30 June 1921 Danlí, Honduras
- Died: 16 May 2010 (aged 88) Tegucigalpa, Honduras
- Party: National Party
- Spouse: Gloria Figueroa de López
- Occupation: General, Statesman

Military service
- Allegiance: Honduras
- Battles/wars: Football War

Oswaldo Enrique López Arellano (Note: Latin American Spanish pronunciation: [osˈβaldo enˈrike ˈlopes aɾeˈʝano].) (30 June 1921 – 16 May 2010) was a Honduran politician who twice served as the President of Honduras, first from 1963 to 1971 and again from 1972 until 1975.

== Early life ==
Lopez was born in Danlí to Enrique López and Carlota Arellano in the department of El Paraíso, an influential family. His parents sent him to an American-sponsored school in Honduras' capital city of Tegucigalpa, where he learned English. He joined the Honduran Army at eighteen and subsequently graduated as a pilot from the Honduran Air Force School (Academia Militar de Aviación de Honduras Capitán Raúl Roberto Barahona Lagos). He then spent 1942-1945 in the U.S. state of Arizona studying mechanical aviation. López served as a colonel for numerous years and eventually rose to the rank of general.

== Career ==
López briefly fought for a military junta during 1957, which ended after democratic elections were secured. After a violent coup, he served as president for the first time from 3 October 1963 until 7 June 1971 before allowing further elections (1971 Honduran general election) to take place in April 1971. They ultimately resulted in Ramón Ernesto Cruz coming to power. On 4 December 1972, López again seized power, in the 1972 Honduran coup d'état.

During his second tenure as president, López oversaw a major land reform bill that sought to defuse tensions among peasants over their forced removal from uncultivated lands owned by landed elites or by US fruit companies. This plan was called the National Development Plan and went through two stages, the first in 1965 and the most significant ones between 1972 and 1975. The Agrarian Reform Law of 1972, a Minimum Wage Act in 1973, and a Land Reform Act in 1975 came in response to the peasant union pressure, such as the CTH, Confederación de Trabajadores Hondureños and the ANACH Associación Nacional de Campesinos Hondureños. The most important unions clamoring for reform were the United Fruit and Standard Fruit unions SITRATERCO and SUSTRAFSCO. These unions also had support among industrial workers.

López led Honduran forces during the Football War.

=== Resignation ===
In 1975, the U.S. Securities and Exchange Commission exposed a scheme by United Brands Company to bribe President López with US$1.25 million, with the promise of another $1.25 million upon the reduction of certain banana export taxes. Trading in United Brands stock was halted, and on 22 April 1975 López was ousted in a military coup led by his fellow General Juan Alberto Melgar, in the 1975 Honduran coup d'état. This scandal is known in Honduras as "Bananagate".

== Personal life ==
López Arellano continued to deny his involvement in the bribery scandal, or that he had received a bribe at all.

López Arellano owned several businesses in Central America, including TAN-SAHSA, the now defunct Honduran air carrier.

His eldest son, Oswaldo, died in 2003.

Lopez Arellano died on 16 May 2010 at the age of 88 while undergoing surgery for prostate cancer.

== See also ==
- Union of Banana Exporting Countries

== Notes ==
Political offices
| Preceded by Ramón Villeda | President of Honduras; 1963–1971 | Succeeded by Ramón Ernesto Cruz |
| Preceded by Ramón Ernesto Cruz | President of Honduras; 1972–1975 | Succeeded by Juan Alberto Melgar as Head of state |
