= Vicente Tosta =

President of Honduras from 1924 to 1925

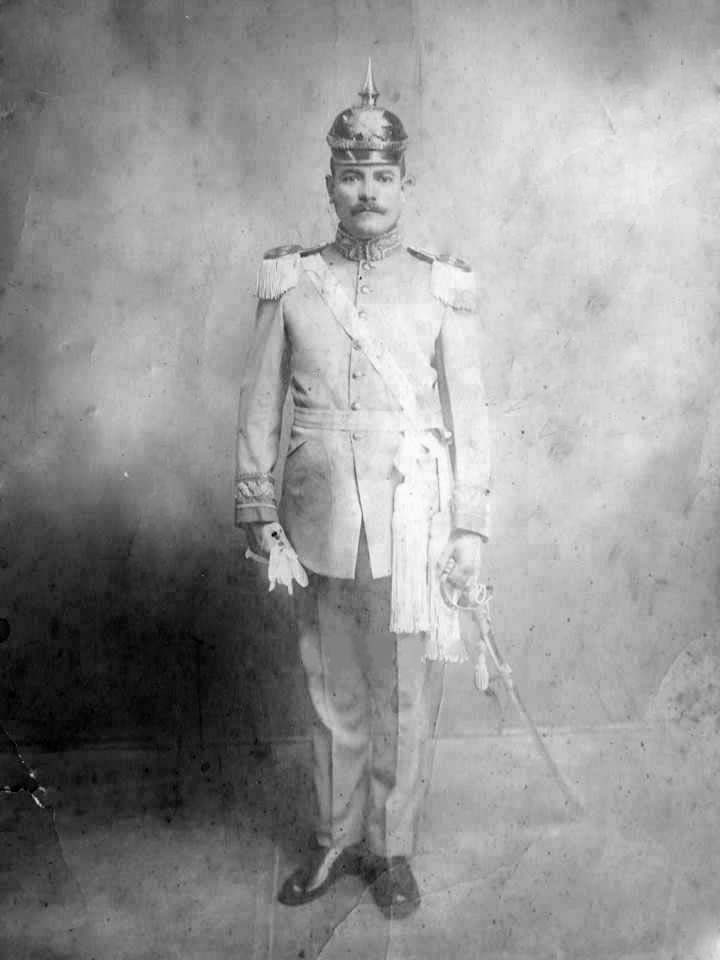
- Vicente Tosta in 1919

35th President of Honduras
- In office 30 April 1924 – 1 February 1925
- Preceded by: Tiburcio Carías Andino
- Succeeded by: Miguel Paz Barahona

Personal details
- Born: Vicente Tosta Carrasco; 27 October 1885 Jesús de Otoro, Intibucá Department
- Died: 7 August 1930 (aged 44) Tegucigalpa, Honduras
- Spouse: Francisca Fiallos Inestroza
- Children: 7
- Profession: Politician, Military

Vicente Tosta Carrasco (27 October 1886 – 7 August 1930) was a Honduran politician. He was the thirty-fifth president of Honduras; a provisional President of the Republic of Honduras for ten months, from 30 April 1924 through 1 February 1925.

== Youth ==
He was born on October 27, 1886, in Jesús de Otoro, Intibucá, Honduras. He was the son of Pedro Tosta López, a Spaniard, and Arcadia Carrasco Paz, a native of Santa Barbara, Honduras. In 1899 he married Francisca Fiallos Inestroza, with whom he had seven children: Carlos, Miguel, Julia, Concepción, Rosario, Rosalía and Pedro Vicente.

== Political career ==
He began his military career in 1904 when he entered the Military School, which operated in Toncontín. He received the rank of lieutenant in 1908. Appointed professor and instructor of the Presidential Honor Guard and promoted to captain in 1909. He directed the school of corporals and sergeants in Ocotepeque. He moved to Tegucigalpa and worked with Colonel Luís S. Oyarzun in the direction of the military school in Tegucigalpa. He was promoted to major in 1910.

In 1919, Civil War breaks out and the target is to take Santa Rosa, by the liberal forces who submitted first on 25 July, the towns of La Esperanza and Intibucá, commanded by General José Ramirez who died in the revolt. Commanders: Colonel Vicente Tosta Carrasco, Colonel Flavio Del Cid, Colonel Gregorio Ferrera and after this trigger military leave for the "Sultana of the West" with a good army who to be spotted, in an attempt to stop strengthening the guard of the town hall and prepare both the soldiers and citizens to fight that has no place until 16 August of that year, to defend the city are the commander of arms Attorney Jesus Maria Rodriguez, Colonel Alfonso Ferrari, General and Colonel Vicente Ayala, with 400 soldiers and after several hours of siege, the city was delivered and the revolutionary forces marched north to the city, en route to San Pedro Sula, Cortes also fall into their power. The U.S. diplomat accredited to Honduras, Mr. Sambola Jones, request the resignation of President Francisco Bertrand as a result of the events in Gracias, La Esperanza, Santa Rosa, Santa Barbara and San Pedro Sula. The government passed into the hands of the Liberal General Rafael Lopez Gutierrez, on 1 February 1920. This conflict caused the deaths of 800 people.

In 1924, The revolution broke out between the forces for recovery of the nation, against the command of General Gregorio Ferrera, Doctor and General Mr. Tiburcio Carias Andino, General Vicente Tosta Carrasco. The city of Tegucigalpa became the first Latin American capital to be bombed, the revolution had two planes which dropped flyers on hand pumps, and government forces only had the plane "BRISTOL". Again, the American ambassador Mr. Franklin E. Morales called for military intervention in his country and the cruiser anchored "Milwaukee" in the Gulf of Fonseca, where 200 marines landed on 11 March that year at 11:00 am besieged Tegucigalpa. In the cruiser Denver, negotiations began between the revolutionaries and the government, out of which was designated Provisional President General Vicente Tosta Carrasco whose regime rose in arms on General Gregorio Ferrera.

Political offices
| Preceded by Francisco Bertrand | President of Honduras; 1924–1925 | Succeeded by Miguel Paz Barahona |
