= Crescencio Gómez =

President of Honduras (1833–1921)

Crescencio Gómez Valladares (1833–1921) served as President of Honduras on two occasions. However his total time as president was less than six months.

Gomez's terms of office were:

- 2 October 1865 – 2 February 1866 (José María Medina served between the two first terms, but returned power to Crescencio Gómez due to ill health)
- 13 June 1876 – 12 August 1876

He served as Minister of Finance of Honduras in 1865, and also Vice President of Honduras in the cabinet of José María Medina in 1870.
