= Union of Banana Exporting Countries =

Cartel of Central and South American banana exporting countries

The Union of Banana Exporting Countries (Spanish: Unión de Países Exportadores de Banano or UPEB) was a cartel of Central and South American banana exporting countries established in 1974, inspired by OPEC. Its aim was to achieve better remuneration from the North American banana trade oligopoly, which consisted of three US companies. UPEB's proposal of an export tax was undermined by the U.S. oligopoly bribing Honduran and Italian officials. The UPEB cartel collapsed when bribes became public. What is referred to as the Bananagate scandal paved the way for the U.S. Congress to create the 1977 Foreign Corrupt Practices Act.

== History ==
In 1974, Colombia, Costa Rica, Ecuador, Guatemala, Honduras, Nicaragua, and Panama joined in an attempt to form a banana-exporting country cartel focusing on exports to the North American market. The Philippines was the only major exporter of bananas to the United States which did not join. The market for banana exports to Europe at this time was quite separate, with mainly former European French and British colonies in the Caribbean supplying European countries.

Banana prices had gone up little in 20 years. A United Nations study had concluded that no more than seventeen cents of each United States dollar spent by North Americans on bananas went to producing countries. At the time the banana trade was highly concentrated with only three US companies participating: United Brands Company (formerly United Fruit), Standard Fruit, and the Del Monte Corporation.

UPEB proposed an export tax of one dollar for every forty-pound box of bananas exported. The companies protested and threatened to withdraw their operations. There was also a glut on the world banana market and Ecuador, the leading producer, refused to enact the tax. Former Costa Rican president José Figueres stated that Standard Fruit's property should be nationalized if the companies refused to pay the tax. Standard Fruit threatened the new president, Daniel Oduber that if there were any more threats, the company would pull out of Costa Rica. Costa Rica dropped its demand to 25¢ a crate.

== Bananagate ==
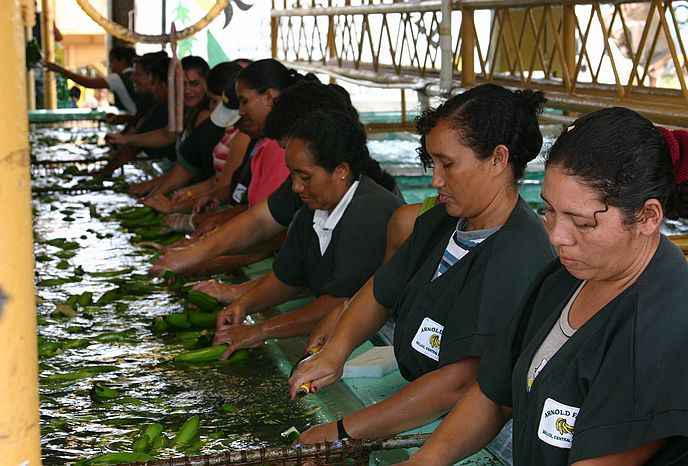
Women sorting bananas and cutting them from bunches.

In 1974, Honduras passed a law to raise the tax on banana exports from 25¢ to 50¢ per 40-pound box. Honduras had supplied more than 22% of United Brands Company's exports in 1974.

In 1975, Eli M. Black, the chairman and president of the United Brands Company, jumped to his death from the forty-fourth floor of the Pan Am Building in Manhattan. When the Securities and Exchange Commission (SEC) investigated Black's suicide, it uncovered a scandal that was named "Bananagate". United Brands had paid a $1.25 million bribe to Honduran president Oswaldo López Arellano, followed by another $1.25 million the next year. The money was to be put in a Swiss bank account. The operation was managed via the Honduran Minister of the Economy, Abraham Bennaton Ramos. After the bribe the Honduran tax was reduced from fifty cents to twenty-five cents per box. This caused the UPEB cartel to collapse. This reduction saved United Brands Company about $7.5 million in tax payments. In addition it was discovered that United Brands Company had paid another $750,000 in bribes to an Italian official to prevent restrictions on United's banana exports to Italy, beginning in 1970. The SEC determined that none of the bribes could have been paid without the knowledge and approval of Black. While it was not illegal at the time for US companies to bribe officials, it was illegal for companies to hide such bribes from their stockholders.

United Brands Company also admitted that it had tried to convince the SEC that the bribes should be kept secret, on the ground that disclosure would hurt the company and its stockholders. The company's Washington law firm, Covington & Burling, asked the U.S. State Department to intervene, arguing that news of the Honduran bribe could harm U.S. relations with that country. The State Department declined.

When the bribe was revealed, it provoked the overthrow of the military government in Honduras and this in turn led to the nationalisation of United's railways along with a major divestiture of land by the companies.

== Later history ==
On May 1, 1975, Costa Rica passed a law to raise the tax on banana exports from 25¢ to $1 per 40-pound box. The decree stated that 45¢ of each tax dollar would go to the government and the other 55¢ to subsidize independent banana growers. United Brands' local subsidiary, the Costa Rican Banana Co., then filed a $3 million suit against the government in April 1975, stating that the export levy violated a government guarantee not to tax the company until its contract with the government expired in 1988.

Since its formation, the Union of Banana Exporting Countries has been largely limited to charging a modest tax on corporate banana exports.

== See also ==
- Banana republic
