= Miguel Paz Barahona =

President of Honduras from 1925 to 1929

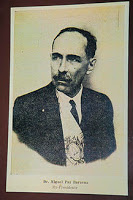
- Paz, c. 1925–1929

36th President of Honduras
- In office 1 February 1925 – 1 February 1929
- Vice President: Presentación Quezada
- Preceded by: Vicente Tosta
- Succeeded by: Vicente Mejía Colindres

Personal details
- Born: 3 September 1863 Pinalejo, Santa Bárbara
- Died: 11 November 1937 (aged 74) San Pedro Sula, Honduras
- Party: National Party of Honduras
- Spouse: Mariana Leiva Castro
- Education: Universidad de San Carlos de Guatemala
- Profession: Politician, Physician

Miguel Paz Barahona (3 September 1863 – 11 November 1937) was President of Honduras from 1 February 1925 to 1 February 1929. Barahona was a member of the National Party of Honduras (PNH).

The PNH nominated Barahona as their presidential candidate in 1924. The other major political party, the Liberal Party of Honduras (PLH), refused to nominate a candidate, which led to Barahona winning the election with 99 percent of the vote. He was succeeded in 1929 by Vicente Mejía Colindres of the PLH, following elections which saw an almost unprecedented peaceful transfer of power from one party to another. His presidency marked the beginning of comparative stability in Honduras that lasted for three decades, following the upheavals of the first quarter of the century.

He was the President of National Congress of Honduras from 1933 to 1934.

The Miguel Paz Barahona Elementary School is named after him.

== See also ==
- List of presidents of Honduras
