= Francisco Bertrand =

President of Honduras (1866–1926)

Francisco Bertrand Barahona
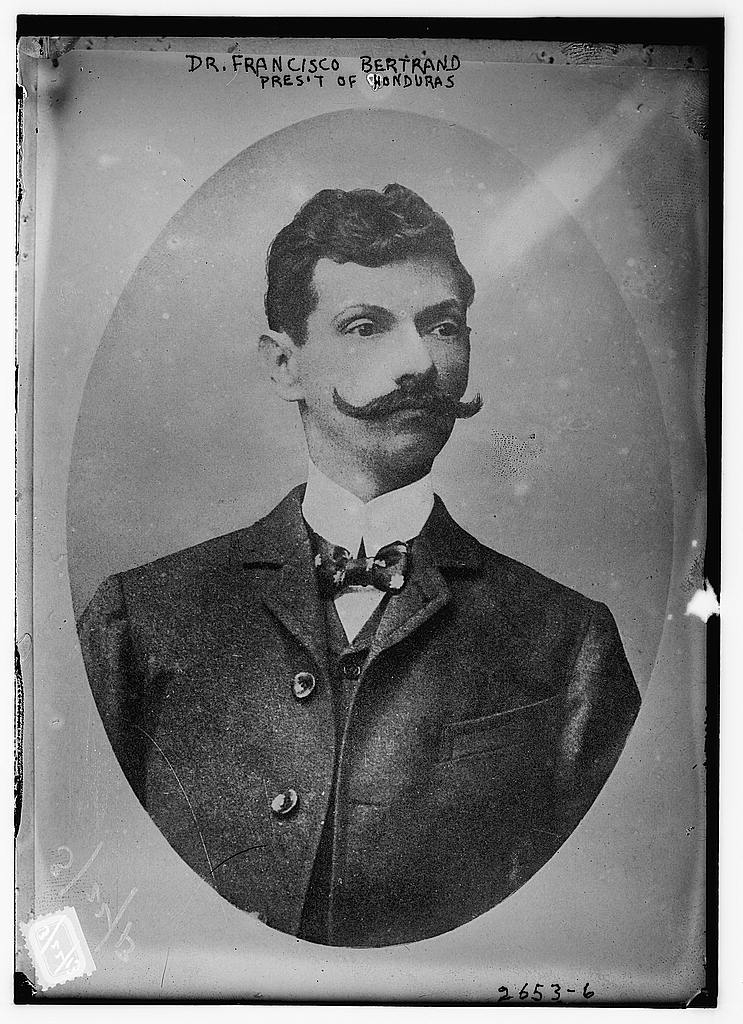
- President Francisco Bertrand of Honduras, wearing a handlebar moustache.

President of Honduras
- In office 21 March 1913 – 9 September 1919
- Vice President: Nazario Soriano; Alberto Membreño Vásquez
- Preceded by: Manuel Bonilla
- Succeeded by: Salvador Aguirre
- In office 28 March 1911 – 1 February 1912
- Preceded by: Miguel R. Dávila
- Succeeded by: Manuel Bonilla

Personal details
- Born: 9 October 1866 Juticalpa, Honduras
- Died: 15 July 1926 (aged 59) La Ceiba, Honduras
- Party: National Party of Honduras
- Spouse: Victoria Alvarado Burchard
- Children: 5
- Profession: Doctor, politician

Francisco Bertrand Barahona (9 October 1866 – 15 July 1926) was a Honduran politician. He was a two-term President of Honduras, first from 28 March 1911 to 1 February 1912, and then again between 21 March 1913 and 9 September 1919. His successor and predecessor was Manuel Bonilla, and Bertrand served as the Vice President in Bonilla's cabinet. He was a member of the National Party.

Bertrand started out with a reputation as a conciliator, but during his last presidency was involved in armed conflict with his political opponents. It is believed that United States of America pressure was behind his abandoning the post of President. He spent the next few years in exile before returning to La Ceiba, Honduras. He died on 15 July 1926.

He was married to Tranquilina Galindo with whom he had one children Francisco Bertrand-Galindo and then he was married with Victoria Alvarado Burchard who had five children named Laura Azucena Bertrand, Francisco Bertrand, Marta Bertrand Alvarado, Luz Marina Bertrand Alvarado and Victoria Bertrand Alvarado.

== See also ==
- List of presidents of Honduras

Political offices
Preceded by Miguel Dávila	President of Honduras (Acting); 1911–1912	Succeeded by Manuel Bonilla
Preceded by Manuel Bonilla	President of Honduras; 1913–1919	Succeeded by Salvador Aguirre (Acting)
