= Francisco Cruz Castro =

Salvadoran-born Honduran doctor, lawyer, politician and diplomat

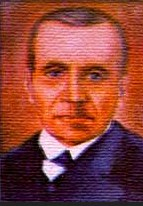
Francisco Cruz Castro

Francisco Cruz Castro (4 October 1820 in Santa Ana, El Salvador – 20 May 1895 in La Esperanza, Honduras) was a Salvadoran-born Honduran doctor, lawyer, politician and diplomat. He was Minister of Government from 1844–1846, Magistrate of the Superior Tribunal of Justice from 1850–1852, Minister of Foreign Relations from 1856-1858 and Provisional President of Honduras from September 5, 1869 to January 14, 1870.
