= Ramón Ernesto Cruz Uclés =

President of Honduras from 1971 to 1972

Ramón Ernesto Cruz
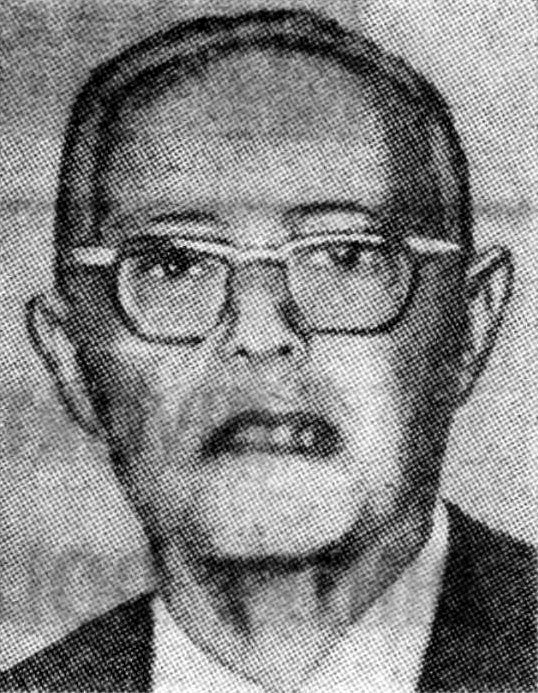

26th President of Honduras
- In office 7 June 1971 – 4 December 1972
- Vice President: René Bendaña Meza
- Preceded by: Oswaldo López Arellano
- Succeeded by: Oswaldo López Arellano

Personal details
- Born: Ramón Ernesto Cruz Uclés; 4 January 1903 San Juan de Flores
- Died: 6 August 1985 (aged 82) Tegucigalpa, Honduras
- Party: National Party
- Spouse: Luz Marina Sequeira
- Profession: Politician, Lawyer

Ramón Ernesto Cruz Uclés (4 January 1903 – 6 August 1985) was the President of Honduras from 7 June 1971 to 4 December 1972.

== Biography ==
Cruz was born in San Juan de Flores in Honduras. His Father was Carlos Alberto Cruz and his mother Elisa Ucles Rosales. He was the eldest son, his brothers were: Herlinda, Carlos, Raul, Rene and Marta. In 1917 he attended the Escuela Normal for teachers where he graduated as primary school teacher. Later he went to Guatemala City where he obtained the title of Bachiller en Ciencias y Letras. He graduated in Science and Law from the National Autonomous University of Honduras (Universidad Nacional Autonoma de Honduras) in 1928(UCM).

He was Ambassador to El Salvador from 1946 to 1948.

He was a member of the Supreme Court from 1949 to 1964. He was also a member of the International Court of Justice in The Hague.

He was the National Party of Honduras (PN) candidate for president in 1963 but instead General Oswaldo López took power. However, López allowed further elections in April 1971 which Cruz won. After serving for 18 months he was removed from power in a military coup, again headed by López.

Ramón Ernesto Cruz died on 6 August 1985 at the age of 82 in Tegucigalpa.

Political offices
Preceded by Oswaldo López	President of Honduras; 1971–1972	Succeeded by Oswaldo López
