= Manuel Bonilla =

President of Honduras (1903–07, 1912–13)

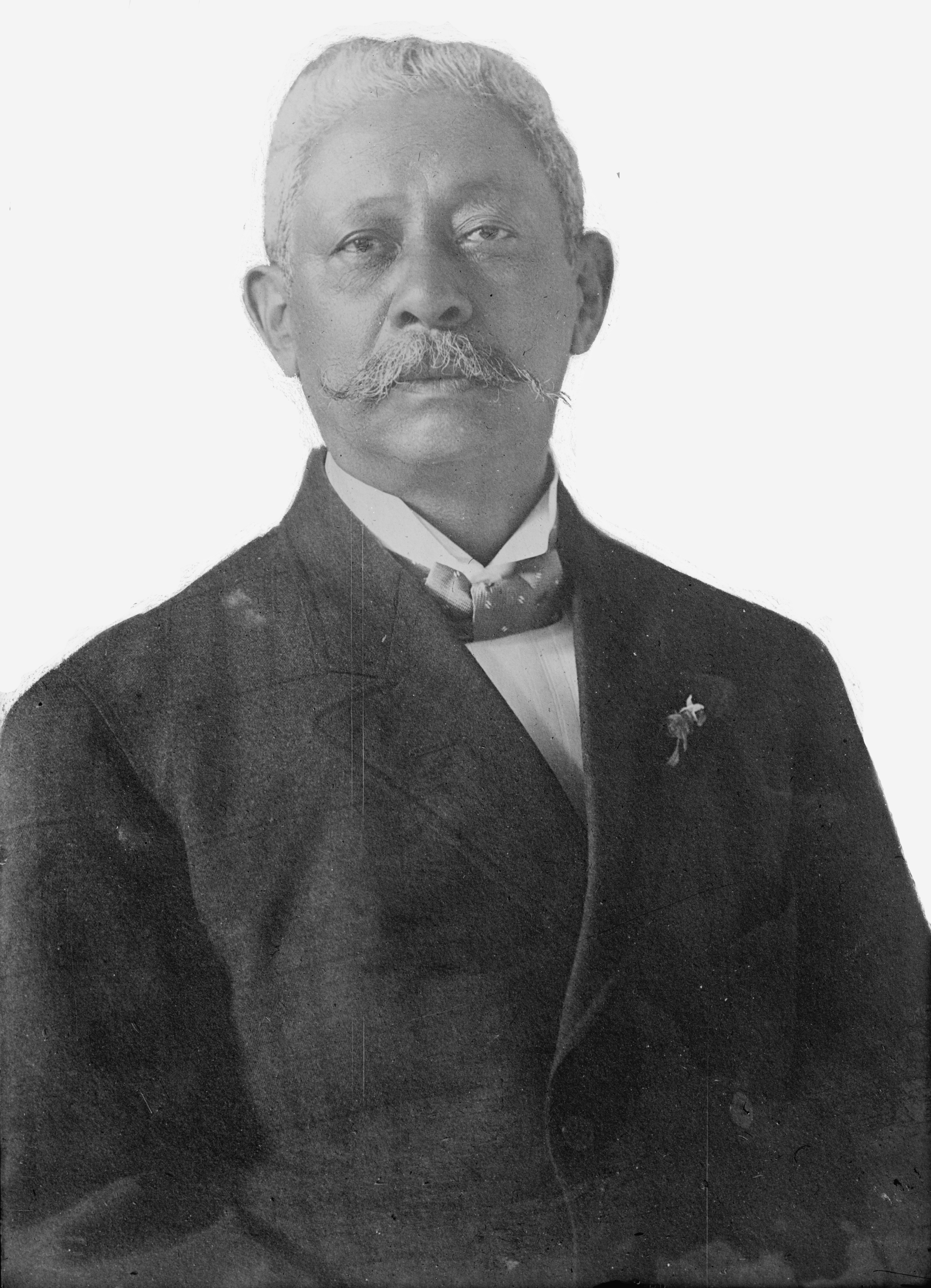
- Manuel Bonilla in 1911

29th and 31st President of Honduras
- In office 1 February 1912 – 21 March 1913
- Vice President: Francisco Bertrand
- Preceded by: Miguel R. Dávila; Francisco Bertrand (acting)
- Succeeded by: Francisco Bertrand
- In office 13 April 1903 – 1 February 1907
- Vice President: Miguel R. Dávila
- Preceded by: Juan Ángel Arias Boquín
- Succeeded by: Miguel Oquelí Bustillo

Personal details
- Born: Manuel Bonilla Chirinos; 7 June 1849 Juticalpa, Olancho Department, Honduras
- Died: 21 March 1913 (aged 63) Tegucigalpa, Honduras
- Party: National Party
- Occupation: General, statesman

Manuel Bonilla Chirinos was born in Juticalpa, Olancho, on 7 June 1849. His parents were Jorge Bonilla and María Dominga Chirinos. He was initially liberal and active in the Partido Liberal de Honduras (PLH) and led the Manuelistas to form the right-wing Partido Nacional de Honduras (PNH).

In December 1910, Bonilla led an insurrection against led President Miguel R. Dávila. The United States negotiated an armistice between the factions where it was agreed to hold elections in March 1911.

As president, he granted generous concessions to the United Fruit Company. During his presidency, the country's schools are said to have improved and the mining industry to have benefited. He commissioned the construction of the Teatro Nacional Manuel Bonilla in the capital Tegucigalpa.
