= Miguel R. Dávila =

President of Honduras from 1907 to 1911

Miguel Rafael Dávila Cuellar
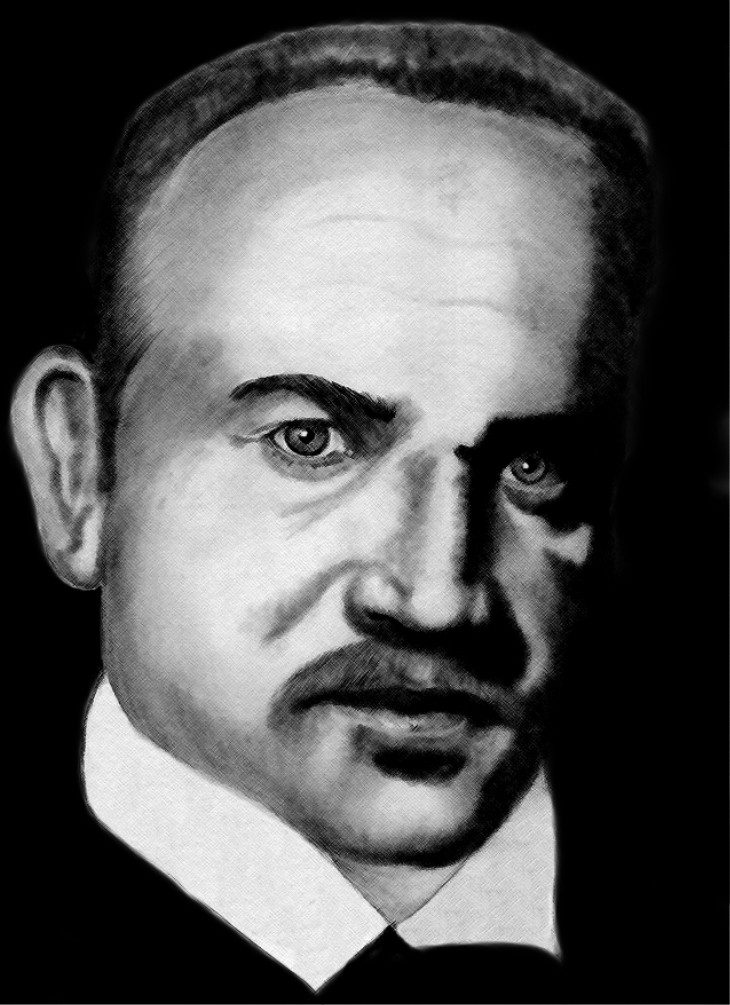

President of Honduras
- In office 18 April 1907 – 28 March 1911
- Vice President: Máximo Betancourt Rosales; Dionysius Gutiérrez
- Preceded by: Miguel Oquelí Bustillo
- Succeeded by: Francisco Bertrand

Personal details
- Born: 29 September 1856 Tegucigalpa
- Died: 11 October 1927 (aged 71) Honduras
- Party: Liberal Party of Honduras

General Miguel Rafael Dávila Cuellar (29 September 1856 – 11 October 1927) was President of Honduras between 18 April 1907 and 28 March 1911.

There was an insurrection against him in December 1910 led by former President Manuel Bonilla. The United States negotiated an armistice between the factions where it was agreed to hold elections in March 1911. On March 4, 1911, Congress selected Francisco Beltran as provisional president.

He occupied various posts in the government of Policarpo Bonilla, including Minister of Finance of Honduras. He was Vice President in the cabinet of Manuel Bonilla from 1903 to 1907.

He died in Honduras on 11 October 1927.

Political offices
Preceded by Miguel Oquelí Bustillo (Chairman of the Provisional Government Junta)	President of Honduras; 1907–1911	Succeeded by Francisco Bertrand (Acting)
