= Céleo Arias =

Honduran politician (1835–1890)

Carlos Céleo Arias López
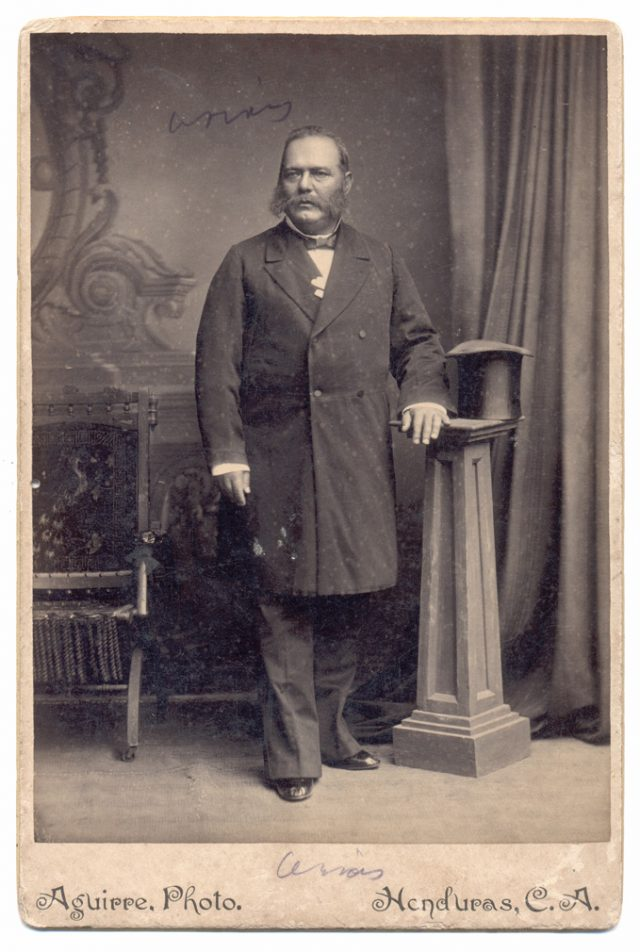

President of Honduras
- In office 26 July 1872 – 13 January 1874
- Preceded by: José María Medina
- Succeeded by: Ponciano Leiva

Personal details
- Born: 2 February 1835 Goascorán, State of Honduras, Federal Republic of Central America
- Died: 28 May 1890 (aged 55) Comayagua, Honduras

Carlos Céleo Arias López (1835–1890) was President of Honduras from 26 July 1872 until 13 January 1874. His presidency was dominated by the invasion of Honduras by both Guatemala and El Salvador. Though he raised a strong resistance, Arias was forced to give up the presidency in Comayagua.
