= Marco Aurelio Soto =

President of Honduras (1846–1908)

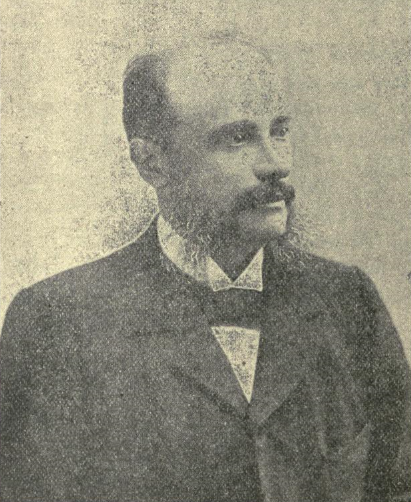
- Soto in 1895

President of Honduras
- In office 27 August 1876 – 19 October 1883
- Preceded by: José María Medina
- Succeeded by: Luis Bográn

Personal details
- Born: 13 November 1846 Tegucigalpa
- Died: 25 February 1908 (aged 61) Paris

Marco Aurelio Soto Martínez (13 November 1846 – 25 February 1908) was President of Honduras from 1876 to 1883. He was known as a liberal. He was a reforming president and had a great impact on the Honduras of his time, including the establishment of the Biblioteca Nacional de Honduras in 1880.

== Biography ==
Dr. Marco Aurelio Soto was born in Tegucigalpa, Honduras. His parents were Dr. Máximo Soto and Mrs. Francisca Martínez. When he was nine years old he moved with his father, Dr. Don Máximo Soto to Guatemala, where he studied with brilliant success, and crowned his career as a lawyer.

As a very young man he began to draw attention for his literary and political articles, the latter inspired by the principles proclaimed by the revolution of 1871, which he supported. General Justo Rufino Barrios appointed Soto to the duties of a Sub-secretary of State, where he revealed remarkable talent. Shortly after the minister himself was relieved of office, Soto stayed in charge of the Ministry of the Interior, Justice and Ecclesiastical Affairs, to which he was soon permanently appointed.

Later he took on the duties of the Ministries of Foreign Affairs and Public Instruction. In this last position he organized the first public primary, secondary and vocational instruction to be founded on modern principles. In 1876, Soto was appointed Minister Plenipotentiary to Guatemala, To secure peace between Guatemala and El Salvador, a mission which he completed successfully, and signed the Soto-Ulloa Treaty in Santa Ana on 8 May.

Marco Aurelio Soto ruled Honduras in different periods. In 1876 he served as interim president. In 1877 he was constitutional president, a period that lasted until 1883 after his re-election. During his administration and with the assistance of his cousin Ramón Rosa, Soto launched liberal reforms. These reforms included administrative, political, economic and social attempts to alleviate the disastrous situation of Honduras.

President Soto sought to improve lines of communication and mail service, including building some railroads, a telegraph system and launched an unprecedented education program in the country. In addition, he moved the capital to Tegucigalpa. Despite the progress made during the administration Soto, Honduras remained quite underdeveloped as it lacked export products like coffee to pay for the investment necessary to improve infrastructure.

Soto's presidency was threatened by the Guatemalan government of Justo Rufino Barrios, and for this reason he fled the country, leaving it in the hands of a council of ministers.

He later died in Paris, France at the age of 61.

Political offices
Preceded by José María Medina; Provisional	President of Honduras; 1876–1883	Succeeded by Luis Bográn
