= History of Honduras (1982–present) =

The modern history of Honduras is replete with large-scale disappearances of left-leaning union members, students and others. The legislature approved a new constitution in 1982, and the Liberal Party government of President Roberto Suazo Córdova took office. Suazo relied on United States support — including controversial social and economic development projects sponsored by the United States Agency for International Development — during a severe economic recession. According to the US State Department, "Honduras became host to the largest Peace Corps mission in the world, and non-governmental and international voluntary agencies proliferated."

As the 1985 election approached, the Liberal Party of Honduras interpreted election law as permitting multiple presidential candidates from one party. It claimed victory when its presidential candidates (who received 42% of the vote) collectively outpolled the National Party of Honduras candidate, Rafael Leonardo Callejas Romero. José Azcona del Hoyo, the Liberal Party candidate who received the most votes of the Liberal Party candidates, assumed the presidency in 1986. With the endorsement of the Honduran military, the Azcona administration ushered in the first peaceful transfer of power from one civilian president to another in more than 30 years.

Nationalist Rafael Leonardo Callejas Romero won the following presidential election and took office in 1990. The nation's fiscal deficit ballooned during Callejas' final year in office. Growing public dissatisfaction with the rising cost of living and with widespread government corruption led voters in 1993 to elect Liberal Party candidate Carlos Roberto Reina with 56% of the vote. President Reina, elected on a platform calling for a "moral revolution", actively prosecuted corruption and pursued those responsible for human rights abuses in the 1980s. He created a modern attorney general's office and investigative police force, increased civilian control over the armed forces, transferred the police from military to civilian authority, and restored national fiscal health.

Liberal Carlos Roberto Flores Facussé took office in 1998. Flores inaugurated reforms and modernized the Honduran government and economy, with emphasis on helping Honduras' poorest citizens while maintaining the country's fiscal health and improving international competitiveness. In October 1998, Hurricane Mitch devastated Honduras, leaving more than 7,000 people dead and 1.5 million displaced. Damages totaled nearly $3 billion.

Ricardo Rodolfo Maduro Joest of the National Party of Honduras won the 2001 presidential elections, and took office in 2002. Maduro deployed joint police-military forces and wider neighborhood patrols to fight crime and gangs. Maduro strongly supported the global war on terrorism and joined the U.S.-led coalition in Iraq, contributing 370 troops for eleven months. Under Maduro Honduras also negotiated and ratified the Dominican Republic-Central America Free Trade Agreement, received debt relief, became the first Latin American country to sign a Millennium Challenge Account compact with the U.S., and actively promoted greater Central American integration.

Jose Manuel "Mel" Zelaya Rosales of the Liberal Party won the November 27, 2005 presidential election with less than a 4% margin of victory, the smallest margin ever in Honduran electoral history. Zelaya's campaign theme was "citizen power", and he vowed to increase government transparency and combat narcotrafficking, while maintaining macroeconomic stability. The Liberal Party won 62 of the 128 congressional seats, just short of an absolute majority.

== Honduras in the middle: United States policy and the Central American crisis ==
=== The Suazo Córdova administration: Caudillo politics in the shadow of the military ===
President Roberto Suazo Córdova took office at a time of extreme political ferment in Central America. The United States government wanted to halt or roll back what it considered to be pro-Soviet forces on the isthmus. The leftist insurgency of the Farabundo Martí National Liberation Front (Spanish: Frente Farabundo Martí de Liberación Nacional, FMLN) in El Salvador had been underway for some two years, and the outcome of the struggle in that country was in doubt. In Nicaragua, the Sandinista National Liberation Front (Spanish: Frente Sandinista de Liberación Nacional, FSLN) was instituting social-democratic policies with considerable success for the poor majority. Honduras — poor in resources, lacking democratic traditions, and strategically located between two revolutionary governments — almost inevitably drew the attention and involvement of Washington.

Suazo Córdova, a country doctor from La Paz, was a veteran of Honduran political infighting, but lacked the kind of experience that might have prepared him for an internationalist role as president of the republic. His initial approach to the question of Honduras' role appeared to stress coexistence rather than confrontation. This reflected Honduras's historical passivity in regional and international affairs and took into account the regional balance of power, which was unfavorable to Honduras. Suazo Córdova's inaugural speech stressed self-determination and a desire to remain neutral in the face of regional upheaval.

In keeping with this conciliatory approach, on March 23, 1982 Minister of Foreign Affairs Edgardo Paz Barnica proposed a peace plan to the permanent council of the Organization of American States (OAS), based on the following six points: general disarmament in Central America, reduction of foreign military and other advisors (then a point of contention with the Nicaraguan government), international supervision of a final agreement, an end to regional arms traffic, respect for delineated and demarcated borders, and the establishment of a permanent multilateral dialogue. The proposal met with little support from other Central American states, particularly Nicaragua.

Gradually, the Suazo Córdova administration began to perceive the FSLN government (commonly known as "Sandinistas") as an obstructionist as well as a subversive force that intended to undermine political stability in Honduras through intimidation, propaganda, and direct aid to insurgents. Consensus on this point in the Honduran administration and armed forces coincided with a significant expansion of the United States' role in Honduras both as policy adviser and as purveyor of military and economic aid.

Brigadier General Gustavo Álvarez Martínez, who assumed the position of commander of the armed forces in January 1982, emerged as a hardliner against the Sandinistas. He publicly declared Honduras "in a war to the death" with Nicaragua; and believed such a war should be conducted under the auspices of a triple alliance between Guatemala, El Salvador, and Honduras. Some observers also believed that Álvarez had another tactic in his anti-communist strategy: covert domestic surveillance and extralegal executions. Álvarez's training in Argentina (where such "dirty war" tactics were common in the 1970s) lent credence to charges of forced disappearance and other forms of harassment against the Honduran left.

Álvarez's main rival for the post of armed forces commander, Colonel Leónidas Torres Arias, a former head of military intelligence, had assumed an attaché post in Buenos Aires, after losing the struggle for command. From Argentina, Torres castigated Álvarez in the media, charging that he operated a personal death squad. The Honduran Committee for the Defense of Human Rights appeared to confirm Torres' charges to some degree, by reporting an increase in the number of political disappearances nationwide. According to foreign observers, the total numbers in no way rivaled those registered in El Salvador or Guatemala; the increase, however, was statistically significant for previously-tranquil Honduras.

Álvarez's strong-arm tactics drew criticism, particularly from the foreign press and international human rights groups. At the same time, however, leftist subversive activity expanded in the early 1980s. Much of this increase was attributed to Sandinista support for like-minded Honduran groups such as the PCH, the Lorenzo Zelaya Popular Revolutionary Forces (Spanish: Fuerzas Populares Revolucionarias-Lorenzo Zelaya, FPR-LZ) and the Honduran Revolutionary Party of Central American Workers (Spanish: Partido Revolucionario de los Trabajadores Centroamericanos de Honduras, PRTC-H).

Beginning with minor bombings, these groups eventually progressed to kidnapping and hijackings. A platoon-sized unit of Nicaraguan-trained PRTC-H members crossed the border from Nicaragua into the Olancho department in September 1983. A rapid response by Honduran troops isolated the PRTC-H column; 23 guerrillas surrendered and another 26 died in the mountains, some of starvation and exposure). A similar incursion in 1984 also failed to strike a revolutionary spark among the conservative Honduran peasantry.

The perception of a genuine leftist revolutionary threat to Honduran stability enhanced Brigadier General Álvarez's power and heightened his profile, both in Honduras and the United States. The imbalance of power between the military and the nascent civilian government called into question the viability of Honduras's democratic transition. Some observers saw in Álvarez a continuation in the long series of military caudillos, who had ruled the nation since independence.

A coup and reimposition of direct military rule appeared a virtual certainty to those who doubted Honduras's affinity for any form of democratic government. Others, however, pictured Álvarez more in the mold of Argentina's Juan Perón — a military-based caudillo, who successfully made the transition to populist civilian politics. Like most officers, Álvarez had ties to the PNH. Álvarez served as president of the Association for the Progress of Honduras (Spanish: Asociación para el Progreso de Honduras, APROH), a group made up mainly of conservative businesspeople and PNH leaders.

The initial goals of APROH were to attract foreign investment and to block the growth of "popular organizations" (labor unions, campesino and other activist groups) such as those that supported the FMLN in El Salvador. APROH's acceptance of funding from the South Korea-based Unification Church proved controversial, garnering negative publicity for both the organization and Álvarez. The general's purportedly-popular following, moreover, was suspect. He seemed much more comfortable and adept at high-level political maneuvering than grassroots organization. Eventually, even his support within the armed forces proved to be inadequate to sustain his ambitions.

Although Álvarez had appeared ascendant by 1982, some observers described the political situation in Honduras as a triumvirate, with Brigadier General Álvarez formulating national security policy and refraining from a direct military takeover of the government, President Suazo supporting Álvarez's policies in return for military tolerance of his rule and military support for his domestic policies, and the United States government providing the economic and military aid that helped sustain the arrangement. Some disputed the claim that Suazo was subservient to the military, pointing out that the president refused to increase the budget of the armed forces. That budget, however, failed to take foreign military aid into account. The increase in United States military aid from US$3.3 million in fiscal year 1980 to US$31.3 million in FY 1982, therefore, represented a substantial expansion in the military's role in government.

Álvarez strongly supported United States policy in Central America. He reportedly assisted in the initial formation of the Nicaraguan Resistance (more commonly known as the Contras, short for contrarevolucionarios—counterrevolutionaries in Spanish), arranged large-scale joint exercises with United States Armed Forces, and agreed to allow the training of Salvadoran troops by United States Special Forces at a facility near Puerto Castilla known as the Regional Center for Military Training (Spanish: Centro Regional de Entrenamiento Militar, CREM). The latter action eventually contributed greatly to Álvarez's ouster in early 1984.

The other major factor in the Álvarez ouster was the general's attempt to streamline the command structure of the armed forces. Traditionally, a collegial board made up of field-grade officers consulted with the commander in the formulation of policy for the Honduran armed forces. Álvarez proposed to eliminate this organization, the Supreme Council of the Armed Forces (Spanish: Consejo Superior de las Fuerzas Armadas, Consuffaa), and to replace it with a board of eight senior officers. The reorganization would have concentrated and enhanced Álvarez's power over the military by allowing him to name his most-trusted commanders to a leadership board that would rubber-stamp his policy proposals. At the same time, the reorganization had promised to make the armed forces function more efficiently — an important consideration if hostilities broke out between Honduras and Nicaragua.

Alvarez's view on involvement in Nicaragua led directly to the 1984 rebellion by his officers. Most observers had expected Honduras to serve as one staging area for a United States military intervention in Nicaragua if such an operation took place. The flawed (but successful) Operation Urgent Fury on the Caribbean island of Grenada in November 1983 seemed to increase the likelihood of military action against the Sandinista government in Nicaragua. Although Álvarez supported a military solution to the "Nicaraguan problem", a significant faction of the Honduran officer corps held diverging views.

These more-nationalistic, more-isolationist officers saw Álvarez as subservient to the United States, giving up more in terms of sovereignty than he received in aid. These officers also resented Álvarez's posturing in the media and his (apparent) aspirations to national leadership. On a more mundane level, certain officers also feared that Álvarez would force them out after he had solidified his power base within the officer corps. The prospect of early (involuntary) retirement, with its attendant loss of licit and illicit income, prompted a clique of senior officers to move against Álvarez on March 31, 1984, seizing him and dispatching him on a flight to Miami.

The ouster of Álvarez produced a number of repercussions, both in Honduran domestic politics and in Honduras – United States relations. The armed forces, which had appeared to be moving in a more activist and outward-looking direction under Álvarez, assumed a more isolationist stance toward regional relations and United States policy initiatives. Air Force Brigadier General Walter López Reyes, the new commander-in-chief, demanded further increases in military aid in return for Honduran cooperation in regional affairs.

After some equivocation, López closed the CREM. He also scaled back Honduran-United States military exercises. On May 21, 1985, President Suazo Córdova and United States President Ronald Reagan signed a joint communiqué that amended a 1982 annex to the 1954 Military Assistance Agreement between the two countries. Although the new accord allowed the United States to expand and improve its temporary facilities at Palmerola Air Base (near Comayagua), it generally limited Honduran cooperation in comparison with the terms of the 1982 agreement.

By 1984 the armed forces under López began to exert pressure on the United States-backed Contra forces, the bulk of which operated from bases in the southern departments of El Paraíso and Olancho. Honduran foreign minister Edgardo Paz Barnica reflected the new attitude toward the Contras in January 1985, when he announced that the government planned to expel them from Honduras. Although that statement reflected bravado and frustration more than reality, the Honduran military took more active steps to pressure both the Contras and (indirectly) the United States government.

In February 1985, the armed forces ordered the Contras to close a hospital that they had set up outside of Tegucigalpa. The Hondurans also ordered them to shut down an office that had been used to receive official visitors, mainly from the United States. Around the same time, Honduran troops turned back two United States Department of State employees from a planned visit to a Contra training camp; the troops told the Americans that they lacked a newly required permit to enter the area.

=== Honduras and the Nicaraguan conflict ===
President Suazo Córdova had foreshadowed the Honduran ambivalence toward the Contras in a July 1983 letter to U.S. President Reagan, in which he stated that "our people are beginning to ask with greater vigor if it is convenient to our own interests to be so intimately linked to the interests of the United States if we receive so little in exchange". Although 1983 and 1985 public-opinion polls had shown that a majority of Hondurans supported United States policy in Central America, there was still a growing uneasiness over the country's role as reluctant host to Nicaraguan rebel forces.

At the height of the conflict with the Sandinista Popular Army (Spanish: Ejército Popular Sandinista, EPS), in the mid-1980s Contra forces reportedly totaled between 12,000 and 17,000 (depending on the source of the estimate); this level rivaled that of the entire Honduran armed forces. This fact — and the continued close ties between Honduras and the United States — made it doubtful that the armed forces would expel the Nicaraguan rebels from Honduran territory by force. However, the prospect of an EPS victory over the Contras (which most observers considered inevitable) raised the disturbing prospect of a foreign armed force trapped on Honduran soil. Most Hondurans believed that, under such circumstances, the Nicaraguans would fail to assimilate well into the Honduran population and would resort to banditry in order to survive. Honduran politicians had little faith in the willingness of the United States to assist them, should events take such a negative turn. Most believed that following a Contra defeat, Washington would cut its losses and withdraw all support from the group.

Continued (and sharply increased) United States military aid to Honduras was the counterbalance to the prospect of United States withdrawal from the Nicaraguan conflict. For the years 1975–1980, total aid to Honduras had been US$16.3 million. From 1981 to 1985, the total reached US$169 million. Meanwhile, the percentage of the military budget coming directly (or indirectly) from the United States increased from 7% in 1980 to 76% in 1985.

On March 22, 1986, approximately 1,500 EPS ground troops crossed the Honduran border and engaged Contra forces near the hamlet of Las Vegas. The EPS withdrew into northern Nicaragua without making contact with Honduran forces. Honduran officials acknowledged the incursion publicly, but only after United States spokespersons had trumpeted the incident as proof of the Sandinistas' aggressive intentions toward their northern neighbor.

Shortly thereafter, the United States Congress approved US$100 million in military aid to the Contra forces. Other EPS incursions into Honduran territory followed, notably in December 1986 and June 1987. How much human suffering passed in the frontier region without public notice by any government remained unknown. As in decades past, the spillover of the Nicaraguan conflict into more-peaceful Honduras demonstrated the interrelatedness of all of the states of Central America.

=== The struggle for real democracy: the 1985 elections ===
The forced departure of Brigadier General Álvarez on March 31, 1984 — and his succession by a group of officers who demonstrated less interest in political affairs than he did — markedly changed the political situation prevailing in the country. President Suazo Córdova, previously restrained by his trepidation about Álvarez, began to show signs of becoming a caudillo. Although the constitution forbade his reelection, Suazo Córdova conspired to nominate Oscar Mejía Arellano, a fellow Rodista (the PLH faction founded by Modesto Rodas Alvarado) for the 1985 presidential election. Every politician in Honduras recognized the octogenarian Mejía for what he was — someone who would perpetuate Suazo's control of the presidential palace. Nevertheless, Suazo Córdova promoted Mejía's candidacy with every means at his disposal.

The potential key to a Mejía victory lay in the makeup of the supreme court of justice, which could (under the terms of the 1981 constitution) decide an election in which all candidates failed to receive a clear majority. As 1985 began, the Supreme Court contained a firm majority of Suazo Córdova supporters. The leadership of the National Congress of Honduras, both PLH and PNH, recognized the self-serving scenario that Suazo Córdova had put into place. Moreover, they realized that the constitution granted power to the legislature to remove Supreme Court justices for cause. The Congress proceeded to do just that, when 53 of its 82 deputies voted on March 29, 1985 to replace five of the nine justices because of alleged corruption. Five new justices quickly took the oath of office.

During the debate over the justices' corruption, Suazo Córdova had fulminated both publicly and privately—threatening to declare a state of emergency and close the Congress if the five lost their seats on the court. Although he stopped short of carrying out that threat, troops surrounded the Congress building temporarily after the deputies announced their action and military police took Ramón Valladares Soto (the new president of the Supreme Court) into custody. Arrests of the other four new justices followed. A lower-court judge charged the five with treason. On April 1, the judge filed treason charges against the 53 legislative deputies who had voted to replace the five justices. The proceedings against the deputies, if pursued to their conclusion, threatened to result in the revocation of legislators' legal immunity from prosecution.

The Congress rapidly reacted to Suazo's counterattack. On April 3, 1985, the assembly passed by a 49–29 vote a motion censuring the president for his actions. In another action more calculated to curb the president's power, the legislature passed a bill establishing guidelines for primary elections within political parties. Had such guidelines been in place previously, the entire governmental crisis might have been avoided. Not surprisingly, Suazo Córdova vetoed the bill almost two weeks later — the day after the Rodista faction had endorsed his choice (Mejía) as the official presidential candidate of the PLH.

The resolution of the crisis demonstrated how little Honduras had progressed from the days when the military had (either directly or indirectly) guided events. During the early April days of the dispute between Suazo Córdova and the Congress, Brigadier General López had publicly declared himself and the armed forces "neutral". As events began to degenerate, however, the officer corps began to reconcile the antagonists. At first, the military sought to resolve the dispute through informal contacts. When that failed, the armed forces convened direct negotiations between presidential and legislative representatives, with military arbiters. By April 21, the talks produced an agreement.

The leaders of Congress rescinded their dismissal of the five justices, dropping their demand for primary elections. Supreme Court President Valladares received his freedom. In a complicated arrangement, it was agreed that candidates of all political factions could run for president. The winner of the election would be the faction receiving the most votes within the party (PLH, PNH or any other) receiving the most total votes. This arrangement ignored the provision of the constitution stating that the president must be the candidate who receives a simple majority of the popular vote. Publicly, all parties expressed satisfaction with the outcome. Although threatened union strike action had influenced the negotiations, the strongest factor in their outcome had been pressure from the leadership of the armed forces.

The unorthodox nature of the agreed-upon electoral procedures delayed adoption of the new regulations until late in November. By that time four PLH candidates, three PNH candidates and several other minor-party candidates had filed. The campaign appeared to pit two PLH candidates — Mejía and San Pedro Sula engineer José Azcona del Hoyo — against the PNH's Rafael Leonardo Callejas Romero, in a contest which saw the two PLH candidates criticize each other as much as (or more than) they did the opposition outside their own party.

The final vote count, announced on December 23, produced the result that the makeshift electoral regulations had made all but inevitable — a president who garnered less than a majority of the total popular vote. The declared winner, Azcona, boasted less than 30% of the vote (compared with Callejas's 44%). But because the combined total of PLH candidates equaled 54%, Azcona claimed the presidential sash. Callejas lodged a short-lived protest, but it was probably less than a sincere effort to challenge the agreement brokered by the military.

Azcona faced multiple national and regional problems as his inauguration took place on January 27, 1986. The new president's inaugural address noted the country's multiple social problems, promising "no magic formulas" to solve them. He also noted the growing national debt, and promised to adhere to foreign policies guided by the principle of non-intervention. Azcona's prospects for a successful presidency appeared dim — in part, because his party's bloc in the Congress was still splintered (unlike the more-united PNH deputies on the other side of the aisle). Beyond such parochial concerns the crisis in Central America still raged on, presenting a daunting prospect for any Honduran leader.

== From Contadora to Escuipula: the crisis abates ==
=== The Contadora process ===
Although the crisis in Central America derived primarily from domestic pressures, the region's growing instability during the 1980s drew the attention and intervention of multiple foreign actors—chief among them the United States, the Soviet Union, and concerned nations of Latin America. The Contadora negotiating process (named for the Panamanian island where it was initiated in January 1983) sought to hammer out a solution among the five Central American nations through mediation by the governments of Mexico, Venezuela, Colombia, and Panama.

The negotiations proved arduous and protracted, and by mid-1985 the talks had bogged down. The Nicaraguan delegates rejected discussion of democratization and internal reconciliation, as an unwarranted intervention in their country's internal affairs. Honduras, El Salvador, Guatemala, and Costa Rica maintained that these provisions were necessary to ensure a lasting settlement.

Another major point of contention was the cessation of aid to insurgent groups, particularly United States aid to the Contras. Although the United States government was not a party to the Contadora negotiations, it was understood that the United States would sign a separate protocol agreeing to the terms of a final treaty in such areas as aid to insurgents, military aid and assistance to Central American governments, and joint military exercises in the region. The Nicaraguans demanded that any Contadora treaty call for an immediate end to Contra aid, whereas all other Central American states and mediating countries (with the exception of Mexico) downplayed the importance of such a provision.

The Nicaraguan government also objected to specific cuts in its military-force levels, citing the counterinsurgency campaign and defense against a potential United States invasion. To break this impasse, the governments of Argentina, Brazil, Peru, and Uruguay announced in July 1985 that they would join the Contadora process as a "support group" in an attempt to resolve the remaining points of contention and achieve a comprehensive agreement.

Despite the combined efforts of the original "core four" nations and the "support group", the Contadora process essentially halted during June 1986; the Central American countries failed to resolve their differences sufficiently to permit the signing of a final treaty draft. The United States Congress' approval of military aid to the Contras during the same month hampered the process, according to representatives of most of the mediating countries. Although the mediators vowed to continue their diplomatic efforts and convened negotiating sessions after the unsuccessful June 6 meeting in Panama City, the Contadora process was moribund.

After the process stalled, the regional consensus seemed to be that a streamlined, strictly Central American peace initiative stood a better chance of success than one including countries outside the region. During the course of the Contadora negotiations, the Honduran government sought to achieve an agreement that would settle the Nicaraguan conflict in such a way as to assure eventual reassimilation of the Contras into Nicaraguan society. At the same time, the Honduran military had sought to maintain its expanded relationship with the United States. Paradoxically, the Honduran government found itself espousing positions similar to those supported by its traditional adversary, El Salvador. As a new democracy, Honduras also enjoyed support from the government of Costa Rica (a more-established democracy). The government of Guatemalan president Marco Vinicio Cerezo Arévalo established a more independent position, but still supported the concept of a diplomatic solution to Central America's troubles.

=== The Arias plan ===
The five Central American presidents continued to seek a strictly Central American diplomatic solution. They held a meeting in May 1986 in Esquipulas, Guatemala, in an effort to work out their differences over the revised Contadora draft treaty. This meeting was a precursor of the process that superseded Contadora in early 1987. The leading proponent and architect of this process was the president of Costa Rica, Oscar Arias Sánchez. After consultations with representatives of Honduras, El Salvador, Guatemala, and the United States, Arias announced on February 15, 1987, that he had presented a peace proposal to representatives of the other Central American states (except Nicaragua). The plan called for dialogue between governments and opposition groups, amnesty for political prisoners, cease-fires in ongoing insurgent conflicts, democratization, and free elections in all five regional states. The plan also called for renewed negotiations on arms reduction and an end of outside aid to insurgent forces.

Including the Nicaraguan administration in the negotiations was a sensitive issue. The first formal negotiating session to include representatives of that government took place in Tegucigalpa on July 31, 1987. That meeting of foreign ministers paved the way for an August 6, 1987, gathering of the five Central American presidents in Esquipulas. The negotiations, reportedly marked by blunt exchanges among the leaders, produced an agreement that some had considered unachievable only months before. The agreement, signed on August 7, called for the cessation of outside aid and support to insurgent forces but allowed the continuation of such aid to government forces. As a democratic government free from domestic insurgent problems, Honduras could easily comply with the terms of the Esquipulas accord.

The Central American Peace Agreement, variously referred to as "Esquipulas II" or the "Arias Plan", initially required the implementation of certain conditions by November 5, 1987. The conditions included establishing decrees of amnesty in those countries involved in insurgent conflicts, initiating dialogue between governments and unarmed political opposition groups (or groups that had availed themselves of amnesty), undertaking efforts to negotiate cease-fires between governments and insurgent groups, ceasing to allow outside aid to insurgent forces, denying the use of each country's national territory to "groups trying to destabilize the governments of the countries of Central America", and ensuring conditions conducive to the development of a "pluralistic and participatory democratic process" in all of the signatory states.

Nicaragua's compliance with the Arias Plan was uneven by late 1988, and the process appeared to be losing momentum. The Nicaraguan government took a number of initial steps to comply with the treaty. These included allowing the independent daily La Prensa to reopen and the radio station of the Roman Catholic Church to resume broadcasting, establishing a national reconciliation committee including representatives of the unarmed opposition, and eventually undertaking cease-fire negotiations with representatives of the Contras. The optimism engendered by the signing of a provisional cease-fire accord on March 23, 1988, at Sapoá, Nicaragua, however, had largely dissipated by July. During that month, the Nicaraguan government broke up a protest demonstration in the southern city of Nandaime, expelled the United States ambassador and seven other diplomats for alleged collaboration with the demonstrators, and again shut down La Prensa and the Catholic radio station.

=== Accord in Nicaragua ===
Talks continued among the Central American presidents as they sought to resolve the insurgencies in El Salvador and Nicaragua, and a series of summit meetings took place during 1989. The presidents agreed to a draft plan on February 14 of that year. The plan called for the demobilization and repatriation of contra forces within ninety days, in return for elections. Nicaraguan president Daniel José Ortega Saavedra agreed to hold an election in February 1990. A foreign ministers' meeting also produced agreement on foreign (but non-United States) observers to supervise the demobilization.

The Central American leaders crafted the agreement largely without advice or guidance from the United States. Although the United States remained Honduras's leading supporter and ally, the United States administration gradually lost influence over events in Central America as the Esquipulas process played out. Having apparently neglected its relationship with President Azcona, the administration of George H. W. Bush (1989–1993) turned to a more established connection, that between the United States government and the Honduran armed forces. Although Brigadier General López had been purged and exiled in February 1986, the armed forces maintained a pro-United States stance. After discussions with Bush administration envoys, the Honduran officer corps agreed that nonmilitary aid to the Contras should continue despite the February agreement. President Azcona (reportedly persuaded by the military) announced that humanitarian aid to the Contras would reduce the security threat to Honduras, and would not violate the terms of the February 1989 agreement.

The 90-day timetable established by the February 1989 agreement proved unworkable. In order to avoid losing momentum, the five presidents reconvened in Tela, Honduras on August 5, 1989. Once again, the presidents negotiated without input from the United States government. They produced a new schedule for Contra demobilization, with a deadline of December 5, 1989. The Organization of American States (OAS) agreed to supervise the process. Although the Bush administration expressed disapproval of the new agreement, the White House and United States Congress agreed that the Contras' aid would be cut off if the Nicaraguan rebels failed to disband. The United States Congress approved US$49.7 million in humanitarian aid to the Contras through February 1990.

The December 5 deadline also proved overly optimistic. As the date approached, the Central American leaders again scheduled a summit. The first site selected was Managua. That venue changed to San José, Costa Rica, however, after the discovery of arms in the wreckage of a Nicaraguan aircraft that had crashed in El Salvador. The Salvadoran government subsequently suspended relations with Nicaragua, and an aura of conflict overhung the summit. At one point Azcona stormed out of a session, after Nicaraguan president Daniel Ortega refused to drop Nicaragua's International Court of Justice suit against Honduras over the Contras' use of Honduran territory. The Nicaraguan government had previously agreed to drop the suit if the December 5 demobilization deadline were met. As the summit broke up without agreement, the Central American situation once again appeared dangerously fluid.

The unpredictability of events demonstrated itself once again in the Nicaraguan elections of February 1990. Contrary to most prognostications and opinion polls, opposition candidate Violeta Barrios de Chamorro handily defeated Ortega and the FSLN. Having been forced to hold free elections, the FSLN discovered that a number of Nicaraguans deeply resented the authoritarian rule of their revolutionary government. The Contra insurgency (which had plagued both Nicaragua and Honduras for years) slowly drew to a close.

Although Honduran president Azcona had begun the process eventually culminating in the resolution of the Nicaraguan conflict, another president would occupy the presidential palace as the Contras left their camps in Honduras and headed south. The elections of November 26, 1989 were free of the makeshift electoral procedures that had rendered the 1985 balloting questionable. The PLH and PNH nominated one (rather than several) candidate each. Carlos Roberto Flores, a Rodista and protégé of ex-president Suazo Córdova, won the PLH nomination and the right to oppose Rafael Leonardo Callejas Romero, who had also carried the banner of the PNH when he lost in 1985. Callejas's convincing victory, by 50.2 to 44.5%, reflected public discontent with the PLH government's failure to translate increased foreign aid into improvements in the domestic economy. Callejas became the first opposition candidate to win an election in Honduras since 1932.

== 1990s ==
The nation's fiscal deficit ballooned during Callejas' last year in office. Growing public dissatisfaction with the rising cost of living and widespread government corruption led voters in 1993 to elect Liberal Party candidate Carlos Roberto Reina with 56% of the vote. President Reina, elected on a platform calling for a "moral revolution", actively prosecuted corruption and pursued those responsible for human-rights abuses in the 1980s. He created a modern attorney general's office and an investigative police force, increased civilian control over the armed forces, transferred the police from military to civilian authority, and restored national fiscal health.

Liberal Carlos Roberto Flores Facussé took office in 1998. Flores inaugurated programs of reform and modernization of the Honduran government and economy, with emphasis on helping Honduras' poorest citizens while maintaining the country's fiscal health and improving international competitiveness. In October 1998, Hurricane Mitch devastated Honduras, leaving more than 5,000 people dead and 1.5 million displaced. Damages totaled nearly $3 billion.

== 2000s ==
Ricardo Maduro Joest of the National Party won the 2001 presidential elections, and was inaugurated in 2002. Maduro's first act as president was to deploy a joint police-military force on the streets to permit wider neighborhood patrols in the ongoing fight against the country's crime and gang problem. Maduro was a strong supporter of the global war on terrorism and joined the U.S.-led coalition in Iraq with an 11-month contribution of 370 troops. Under President Maduro's guidance, Honduras also negotiated and ratified the Dominican Republic – Central America Free Trade Agreement (DR-CAFTA), received debt relief, became the first Latin American country to sign a Millennium Challenge Account compact with the U.S., and actively promoted greater Central American integration.

Jose Manuel "Mel" Zelaya Rosales of the Liberal Party won the November 27, 2005 presidential elections with less than a 4% margin of victory, the smallest margin in Honduran electoral history. Zelaya's campaign theme was "citizen power", and he vowed to increase transparency and combat narcotrafficking, while maintaining macroeconomic stability. The Liberal Party won 62 of the 128 congressional seats, just short of an absolute majority.

Zelaya was overthrown by the military in June 2009 as part of the 2009 Honduran constitutional crisis. As a result, Honduras was expelled from the OAS.

On 28 June 2009, the military removed Zelaya from office and deported him to Costa Rica, a neutral country. Elvin Santos, the vice-president during the start of Zelaya's term, had resigned in order to run for president in the coming elections, and by a presidential line of succession the head of Congress, Roberto Micheletti, was appointed president. However, due to the stance taken by the United Nations and the Organization of American States on the use of military force to depose a president, most countries in the region and in the world continued to recognize Zelaya as the President of Honduras and denounced the actions as an assault on democracy.

Honduras continued to be ruled by Micheletti's administration under strong foreign pressure. On 29 November, democratic general elections were held, with former Congressional president and 2005 nominee, Pepe Lobo as victor.

=== 2010s ===
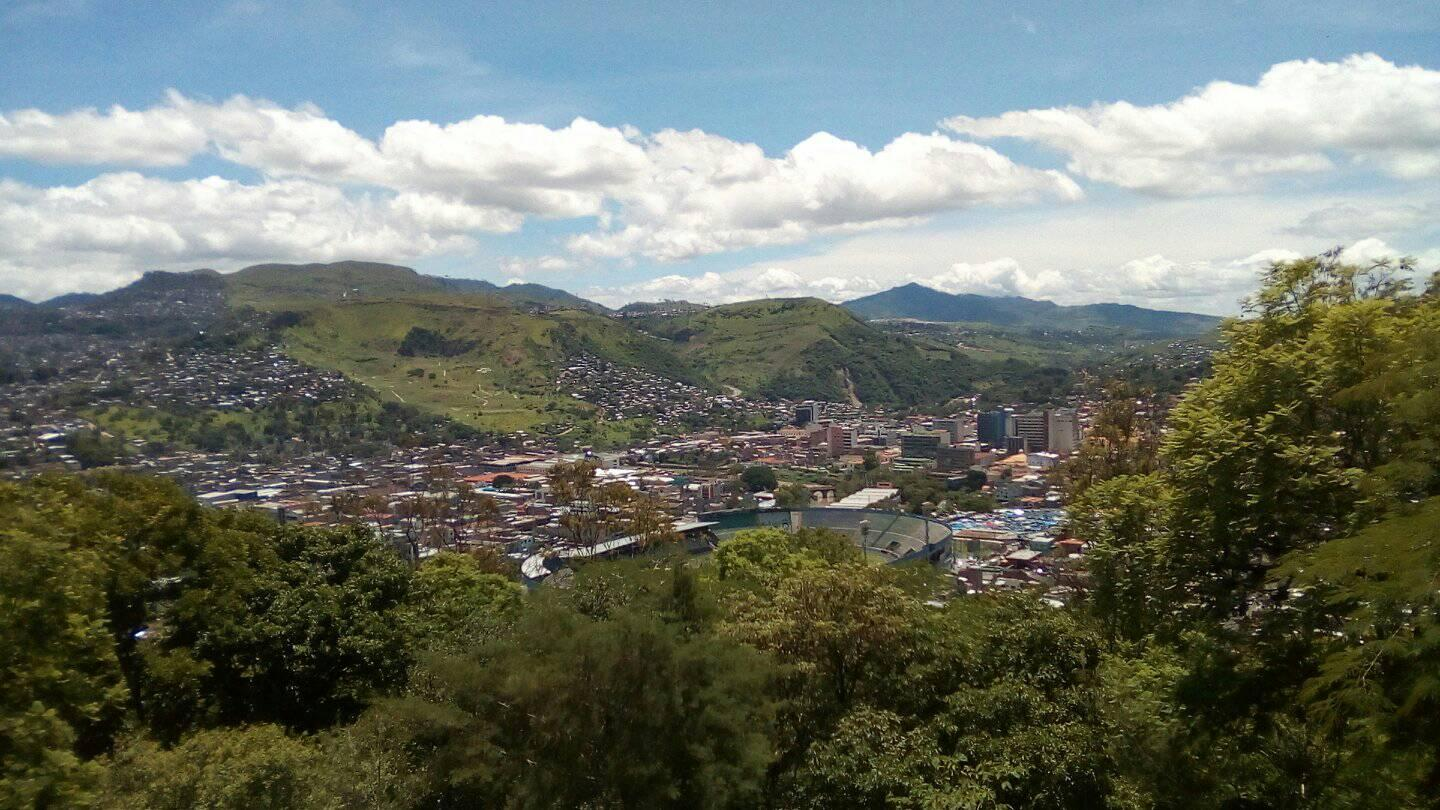
City of Comayagüela in the 2010s

Inaugurated on 27 January 2010, Porfirio "Pepe" Lobo Sosa and his administration focused throughout the first year for foreign recognition of presidential legitimacy and Honduras's reinstitution in the OAS.

Honduras became the only country in the world to ban the morning-after pill in 2012.

After the presidential period of Lobo Sosa, Juan Orlando Hernández defeated Xiomara Castro, wife of ousted former president Manuel Zelaya, in the general elections in 2013. During the first years of his presidency the economic growth helped to improve the infrastructure of the main cities. However, unemployment and social unrest increased during his first term. He opened the possibility of changing the constitution, enraging a considerable part of the population. In 2015, the supreme court of Honduras removed a single-term limit for the country’s presidency. President Juan Orlando Hernández was reelected in 2017, winning the election through an alleged electoral fraud that produced constant protests and violence in the streets. In 2019, Juan Orlando Hernández's younger brother Juan Antonio "Tony" Hernández was brought to trial in New York for drug trafficking. He was convicted of all four charges against him, including drug trafficking and lying to authorities.

=== 2020s ===
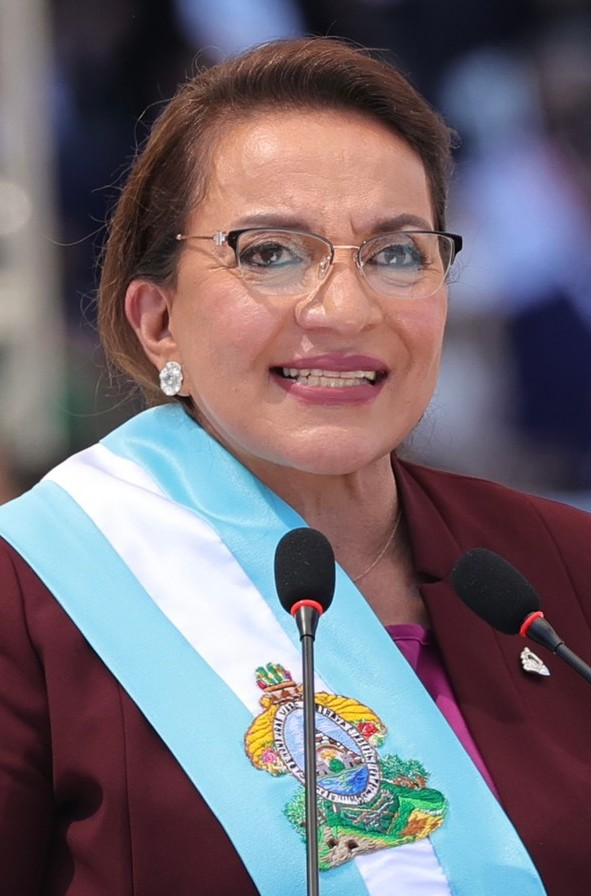
Xiomara Castro became the first woman to gain a presidential charge in Honduras.

In September 2020, Honduran President Juan Orlando Hernández announced that Honduras will relocate its embassy to Israel from Tel Aviv to Jerusalem. Honduras became the third country in the world after the United States and Guatemala to establish embassies to Israel in Jerusalem.

In January 2021, Honduras changed the country's constitution to make it almost impossible to legalize abortion in the future. Before that, Honduras was already one of few countries with a complete ban on abortion. The constitutional reform was supported by Honduran President Juan Orlando Hernández's ruling National Party.

On 28 November 2021, the former first lady Xiomara Castro, leftist presidential candidate of opposition Liberty and Refoundation Party, won 53% of the votes in the presidential election to become the first female president of Honduras. On 27 January 2022, Xiomara Castro was sworn in as Honduras' president. Her husband, Manuel Zelaya, hold the same office from 2006 until 2009.

In April 2022, former president of Honduras, Juan Orlando Hernández, who served two terms between 2014 and January 2022, was extradited to the United States to face charges of drug trafficking and money laundering. Hernandez denied the accusations. He was sentenced to 45 years in prison, but president Donald Trump pardoned him in November 2025, meaning he was freed from the prison. On 27 January 2026, Nasry Asfura of the National Party was sworn in as president of Honduras after winning the 2025 general election. In July 2026, former president Juan Orlando Hernandez returned to Honduras. In 2026, the new Honduran government of president Nasry Asfura has maintained a very close relationship with the United States.

== See also ==
- 2022 Honduran political crisis
