= Modesto Rodas Alvarado =

Honduran politician

- Born: March 15, 1921; Sabanagrande, Francisco Morazán, Honduras
- Died: July 10, 1979 (aged 58); Choluteca, Honduras
- Occupation(s): Lawyer and politician
- Spouse: Margarita Baca Saravia
- Children: Patricia; Mabel; Ana Joaquina; Victoria; Modesto; Lempira

Modesto Rodas Alvarado (15 March 1921 – 10 July 1979) was a prominent Honduran lawyer and politician who served as President of the National Congress of Honduras between 1957 and 1963.

== Biography ==
Modesto Rodas Alvarado was born 15 March 1921 in the locality of Sabanagrande, Francisco Morazán Department, and dies 10 July 1979 in Choluteca Department. He was married to Margarita Baca Saravia, and had six children: Patricia Isabel, Victoria, Ana Joaquina, Lempira, Mabel, and the late Modesto Rodas Baca.

Rodas Alvarado completed primary and secondary schooling and started his career in law at the National University of Honduras, but due to the political turmoil in Honduras in the first half of the 20th century, his family had to flee to neighboring Nicaragua in 1944. Rodas Alvarado continued his studies at the University of León, from which he graduated in 1949 with his doctoral degree in law and jurisprudence.

== Early political life ==
On returning to Honduras, he worked within his profession and gained stature in the ranks of the Liberal Party of Honduras. His charisma became well known, elevating him to become the Liberal caudillo, a man of hope in the party which had been in opposition since 1933. The military junta which had governed from 1956 allowed national elections in 1957, in which Liberal Party candidate Ramón Villeda Morales won, and in whose administration Rodas Alvarado was chosen for the role of President of the National Congress of Honduras.

=== National Congress of Honduras (1957-1963) ===
- President: Abogado Modesto Rodas Alvarado
- First Secretary: Miguel A. Cubero (1957–58)
- Second Secretary: Carlos M. Arita (1957–58)
- First Secretary: Trinidad D. Paredes (1959–60)
- Second Secretary: Hernán Aguilar (1959–60)
- First Secretary: Francisco Lozano (1960–61)
- Second Secretary: Abraham Zuniga R. (1960–61)

=== Legislative accomplishments ===
- Honduras Constitution of 1957
- Social Security Code
- Labor Code
- Agrarian Reform Law

=== La Democracia bridge ===
On 3 March 1963, one of the most impressive and anticipated projects of the era was unveiled, the "La Democracia" bridge. The bridge was planned to unite the city of El Progreso in Yoro Department with the city of San Pedro Sula. The French company D'Enterprises was contracted to design the bridge spanning the Ulúa River at a cose of 2.65 million lempiras. Work was completed on 28 January 1963. President Villeda Morales and Rodas Alvarado attended the historic ceremony together with other cabinet officials, El Progreso mayor Salvador Salgado Mangandi, and other figures.

== Presidential candidacy, removal, and exile ==
On 18 March 1963, the top primary presidential candidates for the Liberal Party of Honduras, Ándres Alvarado Puerto, Francisco Milla Bermúdez, José Ángel Ulloa, and Modesto Rodas Alvarado, signed a document under which they agreed to respect the decision of the Liberal Convention and support the candidate elected from among them.

Modesto Rodas Alvarado left his post as President of the National Congress in the hands of Héctor Orlando Gómez Cisneros as he was selected in the party convention as the official presidential candidate for the Liberal Party for the planned elections of 13 October 1963. Rodas christened his movement as the "Liberal Rodista Movement", and his supporters called themselves "Rodistas" and "Rodismos". His rival at the polls was to be the lawyer Ramón Ernesto Cruz Uclés, official candidate for the National Party of Honduras, but the elections were never held. President Villeda Morales did not complete his term, forced out in a coup d'etat orchestrated on 3 October by officials of the Armed Forces of Honduras to prevent the popular Rodas Alvarado from coming to power, as his ideological inclinations were seen as unfavorable to the powerful transnational fruit companies from the United States and members of the national business elite. Former president and Nationalist strongman Tiburcio Carías Andino had remarked in a speech that the Armed Forces were the inheritors of "nacionalismo", bringing the military to his side.

Popular anger over the crackdowns on campesino strikers was high. The campesino leader Lorenzo Zelaya, leader of the recently founded National Campesino Federation of Honduras (FENACH), was leading a struggle against the unjust terminations of 19,000 farmworkers in the northern zone of the country, which Rodas Alvarado had been supporting with proposals for jobs and improvements to wages and working conditions. For this reason, Air Force Colonel Oswaldo López Arellano took the presidency in the coup, fearing that the campesino protests would spread and wanting to halt the infiltration of communism he saw in their ideology. In his speech on 7 October 1963, López Arellano claimed, among other things, that "red guerrillas exist in various sectors of Honduran territory". Rodas Alvarado was exiled from the country, sent by airplane to Costa Rica, the National Congress was dissolved, and the Constitution of 1957 was nullified.

On returning from exile, Rodas Alvarado and other Liberal leaders such as Villeda Morales and Óscar Armando Flores Midence, supported the candidacy of Jorge Bueso Arias, who lost the 1971 elections to National Party candidate Ramón Ernesto Cruz Uclés, who was ushered in to the presidency by General Oswaldo López Arellano the following year. Years later, Rodas Alvarado retired from political life and settled into his estate in Choluteca Department to work in his agricultural businesses until his death on 10 July 1979.

== Rodismo after Rodas ==
The "Liberal Rodista Movement" was able to survive and carry its spirit to the national elections of 1981, where Liberal candidate Roberto Suazo Córdova won. In the internal primary elections of the Liberal Party of Honduras in 1985, it ran with Óscar Mejía Arellano from Intibucá, nephew of former president Vicente Mejía Colindres, but José Simón Azcona del Hoyo, candidate for the rival "Liberal Alliance of the People Movement" (ALIPO), won these elections and stood as Liberal candidate for the presidential elections

== Posthumous honors ==
- Colonia Doctor Modesto Rodas Alvarado in Tegucigalpa.
- Doctor Modesto Rodas Alvarado School in Tegucigalpa.
- Doctor Modesto Rodas Alvarado Official Institute in San Pedro Sula.
- Doctor Modesto Rodas Alvarado Technical Institute in Guayapa, Olancho Department.
- Doctor Modesto Rodas Alvarado Polyvalent Institute in Ilanga, Colón Department.
- Modesto Rodas Alvarado Institute in La Venta, Francisco Morazán Department.

== Bibliografía ==
- Contestación del Presidente del Congreso Nacional Lic. Modesto Rodas Alvarado al informe presentado a ese alto cuerpo, por el ciudadano Presidente de la República, doctor Ramón Villeda Morales y al señor Presidente de la Corte Suprema de Justicia, abogado Armando Aguiluz Valle, 21 November 1961. Republic of Honduras, pp. 17, 1961.
