= 1985 Honduran general election =

- 24 November 1985
- Turnout: 84.02% (▲5.48pp)
- Presidential election
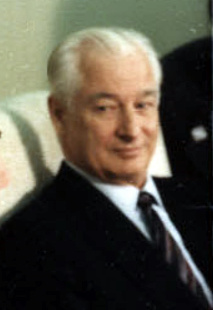

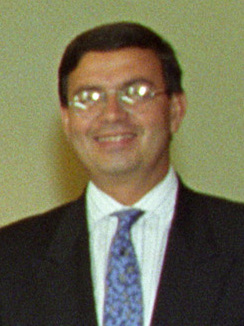
Nominee	José Azcona	Rafael Leonardo Callejas Romero
Party	Liberal	National
Popular vote	786,594	701,406
Percentage	51.02%	45.49%
President before election
Roberto Suazo Córdova
Liberal
Elected President
José Azcona
Liberal

General elections were held in Honduras on 24 November 1985. Voters went to the polls to elect a new President of the Republic and a new Congress.

For this election, the ley de lemas system was used to elect both members of the National Congress and the President. Each voter had a single vote to cast for a presidential candidate, with seats in the National Congress divided based on the share of the vote their presidential candidate had won.

== Results ==
Party or alliance		Presidential candidate	Votes	%	Seats
Liberal Party	Azconista Liberal Movement	José Azcona del Hoyo	424,358	27.52	46
Liberal Party	Rodista Liberal Movement	Oscar Mejía Arellano	250,519	16.25	18
Liberal Party	Movement of Efraín Bu Girón	Efraín Bu Girón	64,230	4.17	3
Liberal Party	Liberal Democratic Revolutionary Movement	Carlos Roberto Reina	43,373	2.81	0
Liberal Party	Liberal Party	Party votes	4,114	0.27	0
Liberal Party	Total		786,594	51.02	67
National Party	Callejista National Movement	Rafael Leonardo Callejas Romero	656,882	42.60	63
National Party	Movement of Fernando Douglas Lardizabal	Fernando Douglas Lardizabal	22,163	1.44	0
National Party	Change and Unity Nationalist Movement	Juan Pablo Urrutia Raudales	20,121	1.30	0
National Party	National Party	Party votes	2,240	0.15	0
National Party	Total		701,406	45.49	63
Christian Democratic Party		Hernan Corrales Padilla	30,173	1.96	2
Innovation and Unity Party		Enrique Aguilar Cerrato	23,705	1.54	2
Total			1,541,878	100.00	134
Valid votes			1,541,878	96.50	
Invalid/blank votes			55,963	3.50	
Total votes			1,597,841	100.00	
Registered voters/turnout			1,901,757	84.02	
Source: Ramos Soto, IPU, Ruhl & McDonald, Statistical Abstract of Latin America

== Bibliography ==
- Acker, Alison. Honduras: the making of a banana republic. Boston: South End Press. 1988.
- Anderson, Thomas P. Politics in Central America: Guatemala, El Salvador, Honduras, and Nicaragua. New York: Praeger. Revised edition. 1988.
- Anderson, Thomas P. “Politics and the military in Honduras.” Current history 87, 533:425+ (December 1988). 1988.
- Barbieri, Leyda. Honduran elections and democracy, withered by Washington: a report on past and present elections in Honduras, and an evaluation of the last five years of constitutional rule. Washington: Washington Office on Latin America. 1986.
- Bueso, Julio Antonio. El subdesarrollo hondureño. Tegucigalpa: Editorial Universitaria. 1987.
- Delgado Fiallos, Anibal. Honduras elecciones 85 (más allá de la fiesta cívica). Tegucigalpa: Editorial Guaymuras. 1986.
- Elections in the Americas A Data Handbook Volume 1. North America, Central America, and the Caribbean. Edited by Dieter Nohlen. 2005.
- Fauriol, Georges A. and Eva Loser. Honduran election study reports: the pre-election outlook. Washington, D.C.: Center for Strategic & International Studies. 1985.
- Lapper, Richard. Honduras: state for sale. London: Latin America Bureau. 1985.
- Molina Chocano, Guillermo. “Elecciones sin ganador?” Nueva sociedad 82:2-8 (marzo-abril 1986). 1986.
- Political handbook of the world 1985. New York, 1986.
- Posas, Mario. “El proceso de democratización en Honduras.” Estudios sociales centroamericanos. 47:61-78 (mayo-agosto 1988). 1988.
- Rosenberg, Mark B. “Narcos and politicos: the politics of drug trafficking in Honduras.” Journal of interamerican studies and world affairs 30, 2/3:143-165 (summer-autumn 1988). 1988.
- Rosenberg, Mark B. “Can democracy survive the Democrats? From transition to consolidation in Honduras.” Booth, John A. and Mitchell A. Seligson, eds. 1989. Elections and democracy in Central America. Chapel Hill: The University of North Carolina Press. 1989.
- Sullivan, Mark P. “Government and politics.” Merrill, Tim L., ed. 1995. Honduras: a country study. Washington, D.C.: Federal Research Division, Library of Congress. 1995.
