= 1989 Honduran general election =

| ← 1985 | 26 November 1989 | 1993 → |
- Turnout: 76.12% (▼7.90pp)
- Presidential election
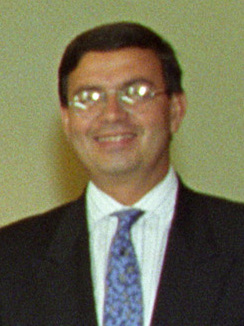

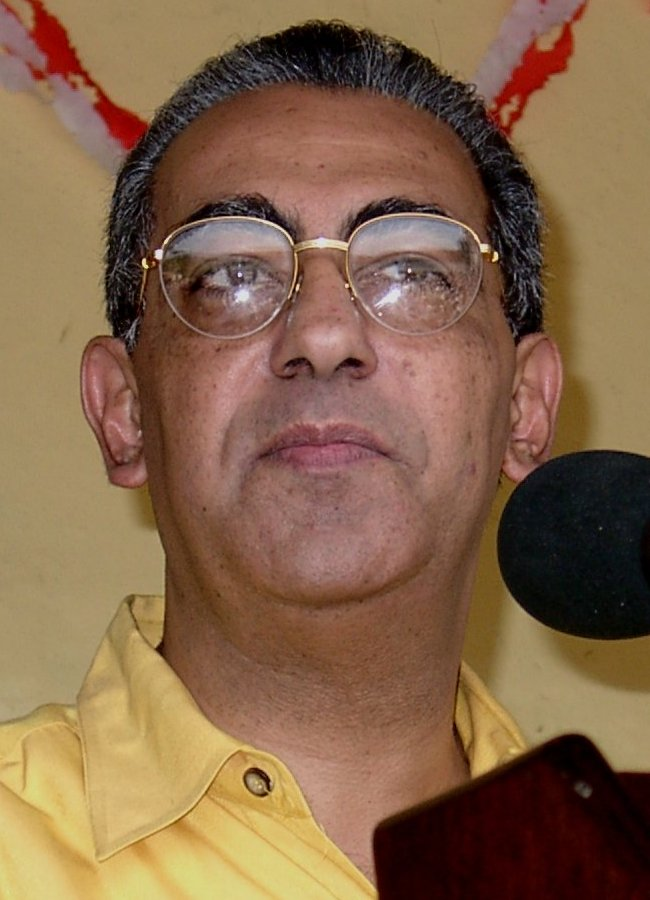
| Nominee | Rafael Leonardo Callejas Romero | Carlos Roberto Flores |
| Party | National | Liberal |
| Popular vote | 917,168 | 776,983 |
| Percentage | 52.30% | 44.31% |
- Callejas: 40–50% 50–60% 60–70% 70–80% Flores: 40–50% 50–60% 60–70% No votes recorded
President before election
José Azcona del Hoyo
Liberal
Elected President
Rafael Leonardo Callejas Romero
National

General elections were held in Honduras on 26 November 1989. Voters cast a single ballot for both the presidential and Congressional election.

== Results ==
| Party | Presidential candidate | Votes | % | Seats | +/– |
|---|---|---|---|---|---|
| National Party | Rafael Leonardo Callejas Romero | 917,168 | 52.30 | 71 | +8 |
| Liberal Party | Carlos Roberto Flores | 776,983 | 44.31 | 56 | –11 |
| Innovation and Unity Party | Enrique Aguilar Cerrato | 33,952 | 1.94 | 0 | –2 |
| Christian Democratic Party | Efrain Diez Arrivillaga | 25,453 | 1.45 | 1 | –1 |
| Total | | 1,753,556 | 100.00 | 128 | –6 |
| Valid votes | | 1,753,556 | 97.47 | | |
| Invalid/blank votes | | 45,590 | 2.53 | | |
| Total votes | | 1,799,146 | 100.00 | | |
| Registered voters/turnout | | 2,363,448 | 76.12 | | |
Source: Nohlen

== Bibliography ==
- Arancibia Córdova, Juan. “Honduras: elecciones y democracia.” Secuencia: revista de história y ciencias sociales nueva época 17: 111-118 (mayo-agosto 1990). 1990.
- Bulmer-Thomas, Victor. “Honduras since 1930.” Bethell, Leslie, ed. 1991. Central America since independence. New York: Cambridge University Press. 1991.
- Canache, Damarys, Jeffery J. Mondak, and Annabelle Conroy. “Politics in multiparty context: multiplicative specifications, social influence, and electoral choice.” Public opinion quarterly 58, 4:509-538 (winter 1994). 1994.
- Dunkerley, James. The pacification of Central America: political change in the isthmus, 1987-1993. London: Verso. 1994.
- Elections in the Americas A Data Handbook Volume 1. North America, Central America, and the Caribbean. Edited by Dieter Nohlen. 2005.
- Fernández, Oscar. “Honduras: elecciones generales, 26 de noviembre de 1989.” Boletín electoral latinoamericano II:37-43 (julio-diciembre 1989). 1989.
- Izaguirre, Ramón. 2000. “Análisis del caso de Honduras.” Sistemas de elecciones parlamentarias y su relación con la gobernabilidad democrática. 2000. San José: Instituto Interamericano de Derechos Humanos. Pages 203-246.
- Leonard, Thomas M. “The quest for Central American democracy since 1945.” Assessing democracy in Latin America. 1998. Boulder: Westview Press. Pages 93–116. 1998.
- Loser, Eva. The 1989 Honduran elections: pre-election report. Washington, D.C.: Center for Strategic & International Studies. 1989.
- Loser, Eva. The 1989 Honduran elections: post-election analysis. Washington, D.C.: Center for Strategic & International Studies. 1990.
- Molina Chocano, Guillermo. “Elecciones sin ganador?” Nueva sociedad 82:2-8 (marzo-abril 1986). 1986.
- Paz Aguilar, Ernesto. “Honduras: se iniciará el cambio?” Nueva sociedad 106:22-27 (marzo-abril 1990). 1990.
- Paz Aguilar, Ernesto. “The origin and development of political parties in Honduras.” Goodman, Louis W., ed. 1992. Political parties and democracy in Central America. Boulder: Westview Press. 1992.
- Political handbook of the world 1989. New York, 1990.
- Sabillón Pineda de Flores, Milady. La mujer en los partidos políticos. Tegucigalpa: Alin. 1998.
- Sullivan, Mark P. “Government and politics.” Merrill, Tim L., ed. 1995. Honduras: a country study. Washington, D.C.: Federal Research Division, Library of Congress. 1995.
