= 1993 Honduran general election =

Elections

← 1989	27 November 1993	1997 →
- Turnout: 64.80% (▼11.32pp)
- Presidential election
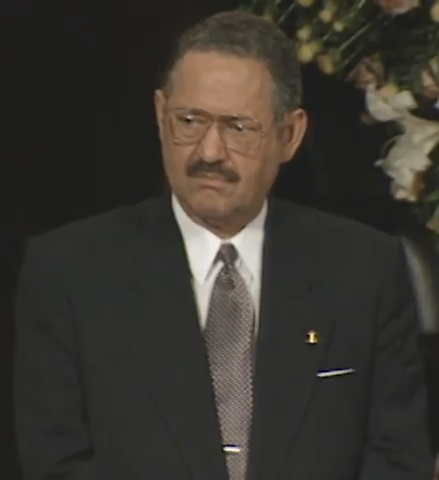

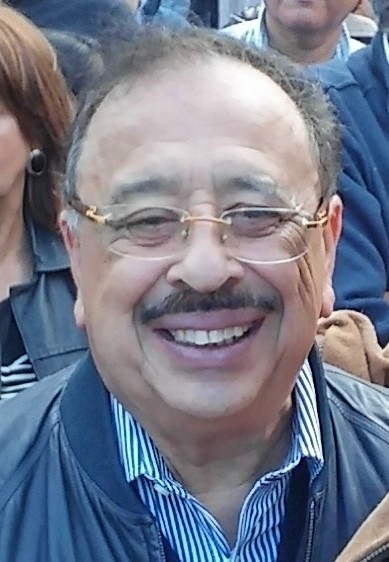
Nominee	Carlos Roberto Reina	Oswaldo Ramos Soto
Party	Liberal	National
Home state	Tegucigalpa	Tegucigalpa
Popular vote	906,793	735,123
Percentage	53.01%	42.97%
- Reina: 40–50% 50–60% 60–70% 70–80% Soto: 40–50% 50–60% 60–70% 70–80% 80–90% No Votes
President before election
Rafael Leonardo Callejas Romero
National
Elected President
Carlos Roberto Reina
Liberal

General elections were held in Honduras on 27 November 1993. Voters cast a single ballot for both the presidential and Congressional election.

== Results ==
Party	Presidential candidate	Votes	%	Seats	+/–
Liberal Party	Carlos Roberto Reina	906,793	53.01	71	+15
National Party	Oswaldo Ramos Soto	735,123	42.97	55	–16
Innovation and Unity Party–Social Democrats	Olban Valladares	48,471	2.83	2	+2
Christian Democratic Party	Marco Orlandi Iriarte	20,350	1.19	0	–1
Total		1,710,737	100.00	128	0
Valid votes		1,710,737	96.55		
Invalid/blank votes		61,088	3.45		
Total votes		1,771,825	100.00		
Registered voters/turnout		2,734,116	64.80		
Source: Nohlen

== Bibliography ==
- Kirk S. Bowman: “Taming the tiger in Honduras.” LASA forum 30, 1:9-12 (spring 1999). 1999.
- Rodolfo Cerdas Cruz: “Political parties and party systems.” Sieder, Rachel, ed. 1996. Central America: fragile transition. London: Institute of Latin American Studies, University of London. 1996.
- Margaret E. Crahan: “Honduras: elecciones generales, 28 de noviembre de 1993.” Boletin electoral latinoamericano X:19-30 (julio-diciembre 1993).
- Elections in the Americas - A Data Handbook Volume 1: North America, Central America, and the Caribbean. Edited by Dieter Nohlen. 2005.
- Ramón Izaguirre: “Análisis del caso de Honduras.” Sistemas de elecciones parlamentarias y su relación con la gobernabilidad democrática. 2000. San José: Instituto Interamericano de Derechos Humanos. 2000.
- Thomas M. Leonard: “The quest for Central American democracy since 1945.” Assessing democracy in Latin America. 1998. Boulder: Westview Press. 1998.
- Tim L. Merrill (ed.): Honduras: a country study. Washington, D.C.: Federal Research Division, Library of Congress. 1995.
- Julio César Navarro: “Los mitos del voto separado en las elecciones de 1997.” Revista política de Honduras 1:183-193 (January 1999). 1999.
- Political handbook of the world 1993. New York, 1994.
- Mario Posas “Indisputable vote against neoliberalism.” Envio (English edition) 12, 150:14-17 (January 1994). 1994.
- Mario Posas “Honduras: elecciones generales.” Espacios 1:69-74 (julio-septiembre 1994). 1994
- Mark B. Rosenberg: “Honduras: democratization and the role of the armed forces.” Constructing democratic governance: Latin America and the Caribbean in the 1990s. 1996. Baltimore: Johns Hopkins University Press. Part IV. 1996.
- Milady Sabillón Pineda de Flores: La mujer en los partidos políticos. Tegucigalpa: Alin. 1998.
- Rachel Sieder: Elecciones y democratización en Honduras desde 1980. Tegucigalpa: Editorial Universitaria. 1998.
- Mark P. Sullivan: “Government and politics.” Merrill, Tim L., ed. 1995. Honduras: a country study. Washington, D.C.: Federal Research Division, Library of Congress. 1995.
- Michelle M. Taylor: “When electoral and party institutions interact to produce caudillo politics: the case of Honduras.” Electoral studies 15, 3:327-337 (August 1996). 1996.
- Michelle M. Taylor-Robinson: “La política hondureña y las elecciones de 2005.” Revista de ciencia política 26, 1:114-124 (2006). 2006.
