= Ley de lemas =

Variant of open list proportional representation

The ley de lemas is a variant of open list proportional representation that is, or which has been, used in elections in Argentina, Uruguay, and Honduras. In the system, each political party (known as a lema) running for seats in a legislative body present to voters several different subgroups of candidates (known as sublemas), usually representing a different faction within the party. Voters vote for a sublema, which contributes to the total number of votes the lema it was a part of receives. Seats are then allocated to each of the lemas proportional to the shares of the vote they received, with the seats those lemas received being allocated to their sublemas based on the proportion of votes they received in their respective lema.

The system can also be used to elect candidates for single-member positions (such as a president, a governor, or a mayor). Each sublema nominates one candidate for the position, with the winning candidate being the one from the sublema that got the most votes from the lema that got the most votes. This facet of the system has been used in Uruguayan presidential elections from 1942 to 1994, and is currently in use in various provinces of Argentina.

== History and use ==
=== Argentina ===
In Argentina, a number of provinces employ or have employed a version of this electoral system. As of 2023, this law is in the provinces of Chubut, Formosa, Jujuy, La Rioja, Misiones, Río Negro, Salta, San Luis, Santa Cruz, Santa Fe, Santiago del Estero and Tucumán. Provinces have complete freedom to elect local and national representatives using the method of their choice; the system propagates down to the municipal level (except in the hypothetical case of autonomous cities).

In the province of Formosa, the ley de lemas was passed in the province's Chamber of Deputies on April 1, 1987 under the government of Floro Bogoda.

The ley de lemas was initially used in the province of Santa Cruz for the legislative elections of 1989, 1991, and 1993. The system was adopted there due to the Justicialist Party of the province being beset by internal factional conflicts that left it without an agreed upon leader. The system allowed the party to stay together, enabling it to win legislative majorities in each of the elections ley de lemas was used in. It would be discontinued by the 1995 legislative election, as by then the party in the province had unified under the leadership of Néstor Kirchner. However, the system is in use in the province again as of 2023.

The lemas system has never been used in Argentina for a presidential election, though the idea was circulated before the 2003 election. In the wake of Fernando de la Rúa's resignation in the wake of the 2001 riots, original plans called for a permanent successor to be elected in 2002 under the lemas system.

=== Honduras ===
Honduras used the ley de lemas for the 1985 general election, although it would be discontinued starting with the 1989 general election.

=== Uruguay ===
In Uruguay, the ley de lemas was introduced in 1942 by the Colorado Party under the leadership of Alfredo Baldomir. The primary reason for the system's introduction was to unite the many different factions of the Colorado Party together while discouraging inter-party alliances with the rival National Party and its factions. Although both parties sought to take advantage of the system, only the Colorado Party was successful in uniting itself. Furthermore, the ley de lemas enabled the two-party system to be upheld in Uruguay, as accompanying legislation prohibited the creation of new parties with names or labels like those used by the two major parties.

The ley de lemas allowed for the election of the President, Chamber of Representatives and Senate by casting a single vote. During periods in which a presidential system was enacted, the presidential candidate of the most-voted sublema in the winning party became president. When the collegiado system (that operated between 1918-1933 and 1952-1967) was in force, the most-voted sublema in the winning party obtained the majority of the seats on the council.

The ley de lemas system was abolished for presidential elections after constitutional reforms were passed in a 1996 referendum, restricting each party to a single presidential candidate. However, the system is still used with a double simultaneous vote to elect members of both the Senate and the Chamber of Representatives. Additionally, since votes for the President, the Senate, and the Chamber of Representatives are linked in this way, the ley de lemas enables a hierarchy of factional control over candidate nominations in the sublemas, with presidential candidates having sway over nominations for senators and both presidential candidates and senate candidates having influence over nominations for representatives.

== Support ==
The ley de lemas can prevent parties from being internally divided by allowing their different factions to openly compete in a general election, much like how they would in a partisan primary, while still running within the party. This was the main reason why the system was adopted in Uruguay, as the Colorado Party was suffering from internal factionalism prior to its introduction and risked inter-party alliances with different factions of the National Party. The system has also been cited as allowing voters to have a greater say in who they elect.

== Criticism ==
Conversely, the ability for multiple factions within parties to openly compete in the ley de lemas has been criticized. It has been argued that due to different factions of parties competing against each other in a general election, forming a potential coalition government may be difficult as the differences within parties may not be resolved by time it comes to do that. Furthormore, the significant increase of lemas and sublemas listed on ballots in the provinces of Argentina where the system is used are alleged by the system's detractors to be due to candidates being on multiple sublemas rather than having candidates having competing political convictions, which has resulted in complications and delays in counting votes.

When the ley de lemas is used to elect single-member positions, it is possible for a candidate that received the most votes out of all the candidates running to not be elected, as said candidate could be from a lema that did not receive the most votes. An example of this occurred in the 1971 Uruguayan presidential election, when Juan Maria Bordaberry won the presidency despite finishing over 60,000 votes behind Wilson Ferreira Aldunate. In that election, Bordaberry won due to candidates from his Colorado Party getting 12,000 more votes between them than the candidates from Aldunate's National Party.

== See also ==
- Elections in Argentina
- Elections in Honduras
- Elections in Uruguay
