= 1997 Honduran general election =

← 1993	30 November 1997	2001 →
- Presidential election
- Turnout: 72.70% (▲7.90pp)
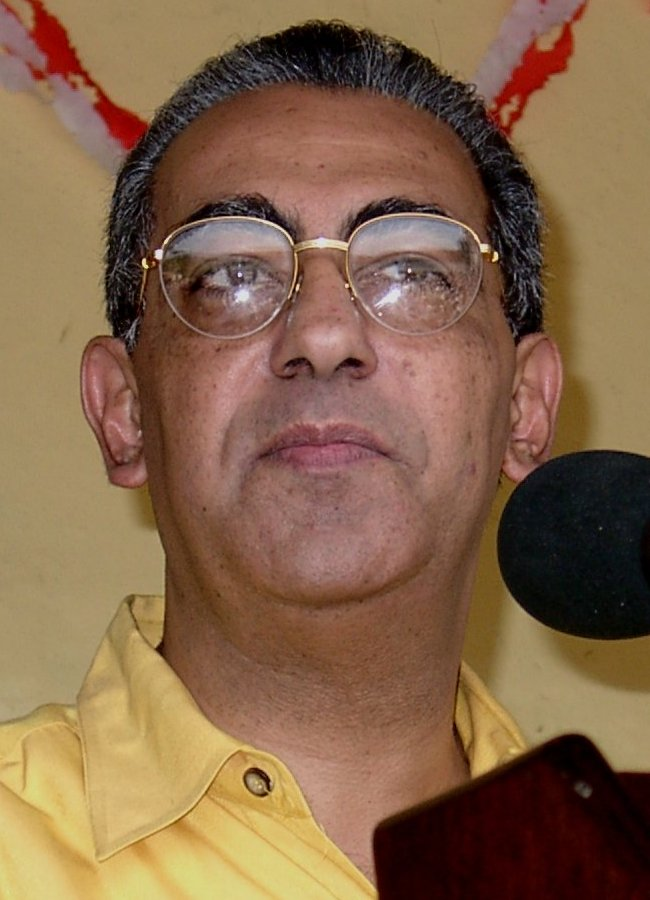

Nominee	Carlos Roberto Flores	Nora Gúnera de Melgar
Party	Liberal	National
Popular vote	1,040,403	844,985
Percentage	52.65%	42.76%
- Flores: 40-50% 50-60% Gúnera: 40–50% 50–60%
President before election
Carlos Roberto Reina
Liberal
Elected President
Carlos Roberto Flores
Liberal

General elections were held in Honduras to elect a president and parliament on 30 November 1997. They were also the first elections in which the left wing Democratic Unification Party was allowed to stand. Closed list PR was used to elect Congress.

Carlos Roberto Flores of the Liberal Party was elected president, defeating Nora Gúnera de Melgar who was the first woman to stand for the Presidency. Major campaign issues were crime and rising living standards.

== Results ==
=== President ===
Candidate	Party	Votes	%
Carlos Roberto Flores	Liberal Party	1,040,403	52.65
Nora Gúnera de Melgar	National Party	844,985	42.76
Olban Francisco Valladares Ordóñez	Innovation and Unity Party–Social Democrats	41,605	2.11
Arturo Álvarez	Christian Democratic Party	24,737	1.25
Matías Funes	Democratic Unification Party	24,243	1.23
Total		1,975,973	100.00
Valid votes		1,975,973	94.24
Invalid votes		86,617	4.13
Blank votes		34,056	1.62
Total votes		2,096,646	100.00
Registered voters/turnout		2,901,743	72.25
Source: CNE

=== National Congress ===
Party	Votes	%	Seats	+/–
Liberal Party	940,575	49.55	72	+1
National Party	789,015	41.56	55	0
Innovation and Unity Party–Social Democrats	78,495	4.13	3	+1
Christian Democratic Party	49,650	2.62	2	+2
Democratic Unification Party	40,658	2.14	1	New
Total	1,898,393	100.00	133	+5
Valid votes	1,898,393	92.05		
Invalid votes	64,176	3.11		
Blank votes	99,889	4.84		
Total votes	2,062,458	100.00		
Registered voters/turnout	2,901,743	71.08		
Source: CNE

== Bibliography ==
- Allison, Michael E. “The transition from armed opposition to electoral opposition in Central America.” Latin American politics and society 48, 4:137-162 (winter 2006).
- D’Ans, André-Marcel. “Honduras: d’un libéralisme à l’autre.” Problèmes d’Amérique latine 30:31-57 (juillet-septembre 1998).
- Elections in the Americas A Data Handbook Volume 1. North America, Central America, and the Caribbean. Edited by Dieter Nohlen. 2005.
- Izaguirre, Ramón. “Análisis del caso de Honduras.” Sistemas de elecciones parliamentarias y su relación con la gobernabilidad democrática. 2000. San José: Instituto Interamericano de Derechos Humanos. 2000.
- Martínez, José Filadelfo. “Participación política de Unificación Democrática.” Revista política de Honduras 8:143-156 (August 1999).
- Navarro, Julio César. “Los mitos del voto separado en las elecciones de 1997.” Revista política de Honduras 1:183-193 (January 1999). 1999.
- Political handbook of the world 1997. New York, 1998.
- Robleda Castro, Agapito. “Violan la constitución y la ley electoral.” Revista política de Honduras 28:65-67 (July–August 2001).
- Rodriguez, Edgardo Antonio. Elecciones ‘97: perfiles biográficos y políticos. Tegucigalpa: Guardabarranco. 1997.
- Ruhl, J. Mark. “Doubting democracy in Honduras.” Current history 81-86 (February 1997).
- Ruhl, J. Mark. “Honduras: militarism and democratization in troubled waters.” Repression, resistance, and democratic transition in Central America. 2000. Wilmington: Scholarly Resources.
- Taylor-Robinson, Michelle M. “La política hondureña y las elecciones de 2005.” Revista de ciencia política 26, 1:114-124 (2006). 2006.
- Villars, Rina. Para la casa más que para el mundo: sufragismo y feminismo en la historia de Honduras. Tegucigalpa: Editorial Guaymuras. 2001.
