= Guadalupe Jerezano Mejía =

Honduran politician (born 1946)

3rd Vice President of Honduras
- In office 27 January 1994 – 27 January 1998
- President: Carlos Roberto Reina
- Preceded by: Roberto Martínez Lozano
- Succeeded by: Hector Vidal Cerrato

Personal details
- Born: 12 December 1946 (age 79) Santa Bárbara
- Party: Liberal Party of Honduras

Guadalupe Jerezano Mejía (born 12 December 1946) is a Honduran politician and former presidential designate aka Vice President of Honduras.

Jerezano was born in Santa Bárbara. Her parents were Julio Jerezano and Victoria Mejía. She studied at the Universidad Nacional Autónoma de Honduras, obtaining a bachelor's degree in public administration. She took postgraduate studies in Spain, Argentina and Mexico. She was from the Liberal Party of Honduras.

Jerezano became the first woman elected as a presidential designate. She was the third Vice President of Honduras from 1994 to 1998, during the term of Carlos Roberto Reina. She was also a deputy in the Central American Parliament.

In 2009, during the administration of Manuel Zelaya, Jerezano was appointed as the president of the Institute for Access to Public Information (IAIP), and served until 2012.
