= 1902 Honduran general election =

General elections were held in Honduras in October 1902. Manuel Bonilla of La Democracia won the presidential election with 49% of the vote.

== Results ==
=== President ===
The official results had a total of 58,589 valid votes, 50 more than the total of votes for each candidate.

Candidate	Party	Votes	%
Manuel Bonilla	La Democracia	28,550	48.77
Juan Ángel Arias Boquín	Liberal Party	25,118	42.91
Marco Aurelio Soto	Patriotic Union Club	4,857	8.30
Other candidates		14	0.02
Total		58,539	100.00
Valid votes		58,539	99.89
Invalid/blank votes		64	0.11
Total votes		58,603	100.00
Source: Nohlen

=== Vice President ===
Candidate	Party	Votes	%
Miguel R. Dávila	La Democracia	28,548	48.77
Máximo Betancourt Rosales	Liberal Party	25,117	42.91
Rafael Alvarado Manzano	Patriotic Union Club	4,855	8.29
Other candidates		19	0.03
Total		58,539	100.00
Valid votes		58,539	99.89
Invalid/blank votes		64	0.11
Total votes		58,603	100.00
Source: Lara
