= Innovation and Unity Party =

Innovation and Unity Party—Social Democracy Partido Innovación y Unidad Social Demócrata
- President: Doris Gutiérrez
- Founded: April 1970
- Registered: 4 December 1978
- Headquarters: Comayagüela, Honduras
- Youth wing: Juventud Pinuista
- Ideology: Social democracy Progressivism
- Political position: Centre-left
- Regional affiliation: Center-Democratic Integration Group
- National Congress: 2 / 128

Website
- http://www.pinusd.hn

The Innovation and Unity Party—Social Democracy (Spanish: Partido Innovación y Unidad Social Demócrata, PINU-SD) is a social democratic political party in Honduras, established in 1970. PINU was created by Miguel Andonie Fernández as a democratic, moderate left-wing alternative to the two major parties and the military regime. The party's request to be recognized as an official political party in Honduras was established in 1978. The party describes itself as, "a progressive and plural party that governs with transparency to achieve social justice, solidarity and the comprehensive development of Honduras in harmony with the environment." The party currently holds no seats in Congress, but held at least one seat in Congress from 1981-1985 and 1993-2021. Since the 2025 Elections, PINU came back in the National Congress but this time with 2 Seats.

== History and electoral timeline ==
=== 1981 elections ===
PINU participated in their first election in the 1981 Congressional elections, which were held on 29 November 1981. They earned three seats in the national Congress. Party founder and president Miguel Andonie Fernandez was the party's nominee for president. The party earned 1.62% of the vote.

=== 1985 elections ===
At Congressional elections held 26 November 1985, PINU did not win any seats in the 134-member assembly. This marked the first time PINU went without representation in Congress since their inception. In the presidential contest the same day, Enrique Aguilar Cerrato, the party's nominee, placed fourth, taking 1.54% of the vote.

=== 1989 elections ===
At Congressional elections held 24 November 1985, PINU won two seats in the 134-member assembly. In the presidential contest the same day, Enrique Aguilar Cerrato, the party's nominee, placed third, taking 1.94% of the vote.

=== 1993 elections ===
At Congressional elections held 24 November 1985, PINU won two seats in the 134-member assembly. In the presidential contest the same day, Enrique Aguilar Cerrato, the party's nominee, placed fourth, taking 1.54% of the vote.

=== 1997 elections ===
At Congressional elections held 30 November 1985, PINU won three seats in the 134-member assembly, marking the highest level of representation achieved by the party since its inception. Overall, they won 4.13% of the vote. In the presidential contest the same day, Olban Francisco Valladares Ordóñez, the party's nominee, placed third, winning 2.1% of the vote. As of 2024, this is the best a presidential candidate from PINU has performed.

=== 2001 elections ===
At Congressional elections held 25 November 2001, PINU won four seats in the 128-member assembly. In the presidential contest the same day, Olban Francisco Valladares Ordóñez placed third, taking 1.45% of the vote.

=== 2005 elections ===
In the legislative elections of 27 November 2005, the party won two out of 128 seats in the Congress. Its candidate at the presidential elections, Carlos Sosa Coello, won 1.0% of the vote.

=== 2009 elections ===
In Congressional elections taking place on 27 November 2009, PINU won three seats in Congress, earning 6.43% of the total vote. PINU's candidate in the 2009 presidential election was Bernard Martínez Valerio. He came in third place, earning 1.83% of the vote.

=== 2013 elections ===
In Congressional elections taking place on 26 November 2017, PINU gained back control of the seats it lost in 2009, earning four seats in Congress. PINU's candidate in the 2013 election was Jorge Aguilar Paredes. He came in seventh place, earning 0.14% of the vote.

=== 2017 elections ===
In Congressional elections taking place on 24 November 2017, PINU won one seat in Congress, earning 1.83% of the total vote, marking a significant decrease in support. PINU did not have a candidate in the presidential election, which took place on the same day.

=== 2021 elections ===
In Congressional elections taking place on 28 November 2021, PINU lost all four of its seats in Congress, marking the first time since 1989 that the party failed to earn any seats. PINU did not have a candidate in the presidential election which took place that day.

=== 2025 elections ===
In general elections place on 30 November 2025, the polls showed that more than 30,028 People voting in the 2025 General elections voted for Nelson Ávila Gutiérrez, the 2025 PINU–SD Presidential candidate which is 0.82% of all Voters in the 2025 Honduran general election making the party 4th place, way less voted than third place Liberty and Refoundation (LIBRE) Party but still less 5 times more voted than the Christian Democratic Party of Honduras during the same election. In addition to that, PINU-SD received 634,168 Votes in the 2025 Parliamentary elections or 3.14% of the Vote, Coming back in the National Congress with 2 Seats.

== See also ==
- Politics of Honduras
- Elections in Honduras
