= 1981 Honduran general election =

- 29 November 1981
- Turnout: 78.54% (▲11.00pp)
- Presidential election
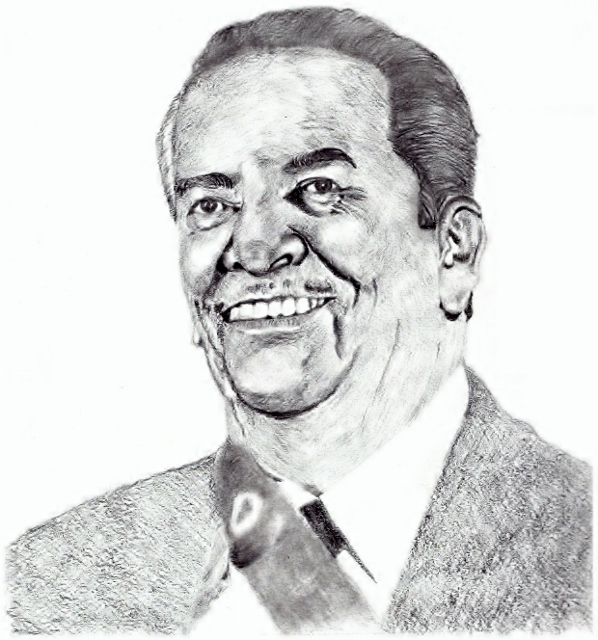

Nominee	Roberto Suazo Córdova	Ricardo Zuñiga
Party	Liberal	National
Popular vote	636,437	491,089
Percentage	53.93%	41.61%
- Córdova: 40–50% 50–60% 60–70% 70–80% 80–90% Zuñiga: 40–50% 50–60% 60–70% 70–80% 80–90%
President before election
Policarpo Paz García
Military
Elected President
Roberto Suazo Córdova
Liberal

General elections were held in Honduras on 29 November 1981. Each voter had a single vote to cast for a presidential candidate, with seats in the National Congress divided based on the share of the vote their presidential candidate had won. The result was a victory for Roberto Suazo Córdova of the Liberal Party, who received 54% of the vote. Voter turnout was 79%.

== Results ==
Party	Presidential candidate	Votes	%	Seats	+/–
Liberal Party	Roberto Suazo Córdova	636,437	53.93	44	+12
National Party	Ricardo Zuñiga	491,089	41.61	34	+2
Innovation and Unity Party	Miguel Andonie Fernández	29,419	2.49	3	New
Christian Democratic Party	Hernán Corrales Padilla	19,163	1.62	1	New
Independent	Delgado Pérez	2,572	0.22	0	New
Independent	Mayorga Madrid	911	0.08	0	New
Independent	López López	514	0.04	0	New
Total		1,180,105	100.00	82	+18
Valid votes		1,180,105	97.15		
Invalid/blank votes		34,674	2.85		
Total votes		1,214,779	100.00		
Registered voters/turnout		1,546,797	78.54		
Source: Nohlen, McDonald
