= Comando Revolucionario Social Cristiano =

Underground political movement in Honduras

Comando Revolucionario Social Cristiano ('Christian Social Revolutionary Command') was an underground political movement in Honduras. The organization was founded on December 22, 1967, by a group of 17 lay Catholics. The group was active in the peasants movement. On September 10, 1968 the group founded the Christian Democratic Movement of Honduras.
