= 1965 Honduran Constituent Assembly election =

Constituent Assembly elections were held in Honduras on 12 February 1965. The Constituent Assembly subsequently elected Oswaldo López Arellano as president.

== Results ==
Party	Votes	%	Seats	+/–
National Party	334,646	55.15	35	+17
Liberal Party	272,198	44.85	29	–7
Total	606,844	100.00	64	+6
Valid votes	606,844	98.85		
Invalid/blank votes	7,044	1.15		
Total votes	613,888	100.00		
Registered voters/turnout	815,261	75.30		
Source: Nohlen

== Aftermath ==
The Constituent Assembly held its first session in March and elected a new president. The opposition Liberal Party unsuccessfully attempted to block the election, and some Liberal members of the Assembly, led by labor leader Céleo González, refused to participate in the vote. However, Oswaldo López Arellano was elected to serve as president for a six-year term with effect from June, when the Constituent Assembly was also redesignated as a full legislative assembly.

== Bibliography ==
- Anderson, Thomas P. The war of the dispossessed: Honduras and El Salvador, 1969. Lincoln: University of Nebraska Press. 1981.
- Anderson, Thomas P. Politics in Central America: Guatemala, El Salvador, Honduras, and Nicaragua. New York: Praeger. Revised edition. 1988.
- Bardales B., Rafael. Historia del Partido Nacional de Honduras. Tegucigalpa: Servicopiax Editores. 1980.
- Becerra, Longino. Evolución histórica de Honduras. Tegucigalpa: Baktun Editorial. 1983.
- Bertrand Anduray, María Luisa Soto de. Historia de la mujer hondureña: época independiente. Tegucigalpa: Instituto Hondureño de Cultura Hispánica. 1992.
- Elections in the Americas A Data Handbook Volume 1. North America, Central America, and the Caribbean. Edited by Dieter Nohlen. 2005.
- Euraque, Darío A. Reinterpreting the banana republic: region and state in Honduras, 1870–1972. Chapel Hill: The University of North Carolina Press. 1996.
- Fernández, Arturo. Partidos políticos y elecciones en Honduras 1980. Tegucigalpa: Editorial Guaymuras. Second edition. 1983.
- Haggerty, Richard and Richard Millet. “Historical setting.” Merrill, Tim L., ed. 1995. Honduras: a country study. Washington, D.C.: Federal Research Division, Library of Congress. 1995.
- Kantor, Harry. Patterns of politics and political systems in Latin America. Chicago: Rand McNally and Company. 1969.
- Morris, James A. Honduras: caudillo politics and military rulers. Boulder: Westview Press. 1984.
- Political handbook of the world 1965. New York, 1965.
- Roberts, C. Paul. “Presidential and legislative election results.” Statistical Abstract of Latin America 12:163-179 (1968).
- Roberts, C. Paul. “Registered voters and voting population.” Statistical Abstract of Latin America 12:180-185 (1968).
- Rojas Bolaños, Manuel. “La política.” Historia general de Centroamérica. 1994. San José: FLACSO. Volume five. 1994.
- Sabillón Pineda de Flores, Milady. La mujer en los partidos políticos. Tegucigalpa: Alin. 1998.
- Schooley, Helen. Conflict in Central America. Harlow: Longman. 1987.
- Schulz, Donald E. and Deborah Sundloff Schulz. The United States, Honduras, and the crisis in Central America. Boulder: Westview Press. 1994.
- Sullivan, Mark P. “Government and politics.” Merrill, Tim L., ed. 1995. Honduras: a country study. Washington, D.C.: Federal Research Division, Library of Congress. 1995.
- Weaver, Frederick Stirton. Inside the volcano: the history and political economy of Central America. Boulder: Westview Press. 1994.
