= 1915 Honduran general election =

General elections were held in Honduras in October 1915. Francisco Bertrand of the National Party was the only candidate in the presidential election, and was elected unopposed. As the incumbent, Bertrand had been constitutionally barred from contesting the elections, but had avoided the rule by resigning in favour of his vice president Alberto Membreño three months before the election.

== Results ==
=== President ===
Candidate	Party	Votes	%
Francisco Bertrand	National Party	77,832	100.00
Total		77,832	100.00
Source: Nohlen

== Bibliography ==
- Durón, Rómulo. Bosquejo histórico de Honduras. Tegucigalpa: Baktun Editorial. Third edition. 1982.
- Stokes, William S. Honduras: an area study in government. Madison: University of Wisconsin Press. 1950.
- Zúñiga Huete, José Angel. Presidentes de Honduras. México. Two volumes. 1987.
