= Oswaldo Ramos Soto =

Honduran politician (1947–2024)

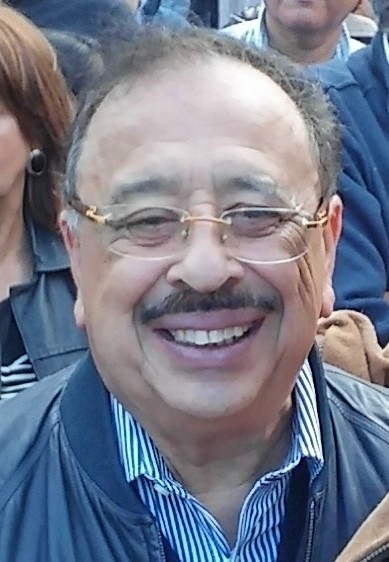
Oswaldo Ramos Soto in February 2016

José Oswaldo Ramos Soto (25 February 1947 – 30 August 2024) was a Honduran lawyer and politician, a member of the National Congress of Honduras representing the National Party of Honduras for the department of Francisco Morazán.

Ramos was nominated as presidential candidate in the 1993 elections, defeating Nora Gúnera de Melgar in primary elections of the National Party of Honduras in 1993; general elections won by the candidate of the Liberal Party of Honduras, Carlos Roberto Reina.

Ramos Soto was President of the National Autonomous University of Honduras. He also was president of the Honduran Lawyers Bar Association, Dean of the Honduran National University and Chief Justice of the Supreme Court of Honduras.

Ramos Soto died on 30 August 2024, at the age of 77.
