= 1919 Honduran general election =

General elections were held in Honduras between 26 and 28 October 1919. Rafael López Gutiérrez of the Liberal Party won the presidential election with 81% of the vote.

== Results ==
=== President ===
Candidate	Party	Votes	%
Rafael López Gutiérrez	Liberal Party	79,068	80.58
Alberto de Jesús Membreño	National Democratic Party	18,582	18.94
Other candidates		474	0.48
Total		98,124	100.00
Source: Durón

=== Vice President ===
Candidate	Party	Votes	%
José María Ochoa Velásquez	Liberal Party	79,073	80.63
Antonio Madrid	National Democratic Party	18,430	18.79
Other candidates		560	0.57
Total		98,063	100.00
Source: Durón, Boletín legislativo

== Bibliography ==
- Bardales B., Rafael. Historia del Partido Nacional de Honduras. Tegucigalpa: Servicopiax Editores. 1980.
- Durón, Rómulo. Bosquejo histórico de Honduras. Tegucigalpa: Baktun Editorial. Third edition. 1982.
- Euraque, Darío A. Reinterpreting the banana republic: region and state in Honduras, 1870–1972. Chapel Hill: The University of North Carolina Press. 1996.
- Haggerty, Richard and Richard Millet. “Historical setting.” Merrill, Tim L., ed. 1995. Honduras: a country study. Washington, D.C.: Federal Research Division, Library of Congress.
- Posas, Mario and Rafael del Cid. La construcción del sector público y del estado nacional en Honduras (1876–1979). San José: EDUCA. Second edition. 1983.
- Stokes, William S. Honduras: an area study in government. Madison: University of Wisconsin Press. 1950.
