= 1932 Honduran general election =

General elections were held in Honduras on 28 October 1932. Voters went to the polls to elect a new President of the Republic and a new Congress.

"President Vicente Mejía Colindres resisted pressure from his own party to manipulate the results to favor the Liberal Party of Honduras candidate, Angel Zúñiga Huete. As a result, the National Party of Honduras candidate, Tiburcio Carías Andino, won the election by a margin of some 20,000 votes."

== Results ==
=== President ===
Candidate	Party	Votes	%
Tiburcio Carías Andino	National Party of Honduras	81,211	
Angel Zúñiga Huete	Liberal Party of Honduras	61,643	
Others			
Total			
Source: Nohlen

=== Congress ===
Party	Seats
National Party of Honduras	43
Liberal Party of Honduras	13
Others	0
Total	56
Source: Political Handbook of the World

== Bibliography ==
- Argueta, Mario. Tiburcio Carías: anatomía de una época, 1923-1948. Tegucigalpa: Editorial Guaymuras. 1989.
- Argueta, Mario. “El ascenso de Tiburcio Carías Andino.” Revista política de Honduras 4:77-121 (April 1999). 1999.
- Bardales B., Rafael. Historia del Partido Nacional de Honduras. Tegucigalpa: Servicopiax Editores. 1980.
- Dodd, Thomas JTiburcio Carías: portrait of a Honduran political leader. Baton Rouge: Louisiana State University Press. . 2005.
- Elections in the Americas A Data Handbook Volume 1. North America, Central America, and the Caribbean. Edited by Dieter Nohlen. 2005.
- Euraque, Darío A. Reinterpreting the banana republic: region and state in Honduras, 1870-1972. Chapel Hill: The University of North Carolina Press. 1996.
- Haggerty, Richard and Richard Millet. “Historical setting.” Merrill, Tim L., ed. 1995. Honduras: a country study. Washington, D.C.: Federal Research Division, Library of Congress.
- Krehm, William. Democracia y tiranias en el Caribe. Buenos Aires: Editorial Parnaso. (First edition in 1947). 1957.
- Leonard, Thomas M. “The quest for Central American democracy since 1945.” Assessing democracy in Latin America. 1998. Boulder: Westview Press.
- Mahoney, James. The legacies of liberalism: path dependence and political regimes in Central America. Baltimore: Johns Hopkins University Press. 2001.
- Morris, James A. Honduras: caudillo politics and military rulers. Boulder: Westview Press. 1984.
- Morris, James A. “Honduras: the burden of survival in Central America.” Central America: crisis and adaptation. 1984. Albuquerque: University of New Mexico Press.
- Political handbook of the world 1934. New York, 1935.
- Posas, Mario and Rafael del Cid. La construcción del sector público y del estado nacional en Honduras (1876-1979). San José: EDUCA. Second edition. 1983.
- Stokes, William S. Honduras: an area study in government. Madison: University of Wisconsin Press. 1950.
- Weaver, Frederick Stirton. Inside the volcano: the history and political economy of Central America. Boulder: Westview Press. 1994.
