= 1926 Honduran legislative election =

Legislative elections were held in Honduras in October 1926.

== Results ==
Party	Seats	+/–
National Party	36	–10
Liberal Party	6	+6
Central American Unionist Party	4	–
Total	46	–1
Source: Political Handbook of the World
