= 1942 Honduran legislative election =

Legislative elections were held in Honduras on 11 October 1942.

== Results ==
Party	Seats	+/–
National Party	45	–14
Liberal Party	0	0
Total	45	–14
Source: Political Handbook of the World
