= 1948 Honduran general election =

General elections were held in Honduras on 10 October 1948. The elections were boycotted by the Liberal Party as the party was restricted from campaigning. Instead, they called for the electorate to abstain from voting.

== Results ==
=== President ===
Candidate	Party	Votes	%
Juan Manuel Gálvez	National Party	254,802	99.85
Angel Zúñiga Huete	Liberal Party	210	0.08
Other candidates		178	0.07
Total		255,190	100.00
Valid votes		255,190	98.78
Invalid/blank votes		3,155	1.22
Total votes		258,345	100.00
Registered voters/turnout		300,496	85.97
Source: Nohlen

=== Congress ===
Party	Seats	+/–
National Party	49	+4
Liberal Party	0	0
Others	0	–
Total	49	+4
Source: Political Handbook of the World

== Bibliography ==
- Argueta, Mario. Tiburcio Carías: anatomía de una época, 1923-1948. Tegucigalpa: Editorial Guaymuras. 1989.
- Bardales B., Rafael. Historia del Partido Nacional de Honduras. Tegucigalpa: Servicopiax Editores. 1980.
- Elections in the Americas A Data Handbook Volume 1. North America, Central America, and the Caribbean. Edited by Dieter Nohlen. 2005.
- Euraque, Darío A. Reinterpreting the banana republic: region and state in Honduras, 1870-1972. Chapel Hill: The University of North Carolina Press. 1996.
- Krehm, William. Democracia y tiranias en el Caribe. Buenos Aires: Editorial Parnaso. (First edition in 1947). 1957.
- Leonard, Thomas M. “The quest for Central American democracy since 1945.” Assessing democracy in Latin America. 1998. Boulder: Westview Press.
- Parker, Franklin D. The Central American republics. Westport: Greenwood Press. Reprint of 1964 original. 1981.
- Political handbook of the world 1948. New York, 1949.
- Posas, Mario and Rafael del Cid. La construcción del sector público y del estado nacional en Honduras (1876-1979). San José: EDUCA. Second edition. 1983.
- Rojas Bolaños, Manuel. “La política.” Historia general de Centroamérica. 1994. San José: FLACSO. Volume five1994.
- Stokes, William S. Honduras: an area study in government. Madison: University of Wisconsin Press. 1950.
- Weaver, Frederick Stirton. Inside the volcano: the history and political economy of Central America. Boulder: Westview Press. 1994.
