= 1934 Honduran legislative election =

Legislative elections were held in Honduras on 28 October 1934.

== Results ==
Party	Seats	+/–
National Party	55	+12
Liberal Party	4	–11
Total	59	+3
Source: Argueta
