= Center-Democratic Integration Group =

Political group in the Central American Parliament

Center-Democratic Integration Group Grupo Integración Centro - Democrático
- Founded: 28 October 1991; 33 years ago
- Headquarters: Guatemala City
- Ideology: Liberalism; Social democracy Christian democracy
- Political position: Centre; Factions: Centre-left to centre-right
- Central American Parliament: 48 / 120

The Center-Democratic Integration (Spanish: Grupo Integración Centro - Democrático) is a political group in the Central American Parliament, or PARLACEN. It is made up of member parties across Central America, ranging from centre-left to centre-right, and holds a plurality of 48 seats in the Central American Parliament.

== Members ==
=== Current ===
Country	Political party	Ideology
El Salvador	Nuevas Ideas	Populism
El Salvador	Grand Alliance for National Unity	Social conservatism Economic liberalism Populism
El Salvador	National Coalition Party	Conservatism; Nationalism
El Salvador	Christian Democratic Party	Christian democracy
Guatemala	National Unity of Hope	Social democracy Populism
Guatemala	Commitment, Renewal and Order	Social conservatism
Honduras	Liberal Party of Honduras	Liberalism
Honduras	Innovation and Unity Party	Social democracy Progressivism
Honduras	Christian Democratic Party of Honduras	Christian democracy
Nicaragua	Independent Liberal Party	Liberalism
Nicaragua	Constitutionalist Liberal Party	Conservatism
Panama	Democratic Revolutionary Party	Social democracy Populism
Panama	Panameñista Party	Populism; National conservatism
Panama	Democratic Change	Conservatism; Economic liberalism
Panama	Patriotic Union	Liberalism
Panama	MOLIRENA	Liberalism; Conservatism; Nationalism
Dominican Republic	Dominican Revolutionary Party	Populism
Cibao	Democratic Cibao	Centrism

=== Former ===
Country	Political party
Guatemala	National Change Union
Guatemala	Renewed Democratic Liberty

== See also ==
- Parliamentary Group of the Left
- Central American Parliament
