= 1936 Honduran Constituent Assembly election =

Constituent Assembly elections were held in Honduras on 26 January 1936.

== Background ==
Congress voted on 6 January to call elections for a Constituent Assembly to write a new constitution, with 56 in favour and two against.

== Results ==
Party	Votes	%	Seats
National Party	132,948	99.97	59
Liberal Party	46	0.03	0
Total	132,994	100.00	59
Source: Argueta

== Aftermath ==
The newly elected Assembly met for the first time on 8 March. It drafted a constitution, article 202 of which allowed president Tiburcio Carías Andino and vice president Abraham Williams Calderón to continue in power until 1 January 1943. It also extended its term until December 1942.

== Bibliography ==
- Argueta, Mario. Tiburcio Carías: anatomía de una época, 1923-1948. Tegucigalpa: Editorial Guaymuras. 1989.
- Dodd, Thomas JTiburcio Carías: portrait of a Honduran political leader. Baton Rouge: Louisiana State University Press. . 2005.
- Elections in the Americas A Data Handbook Volume 1. North America, Central America, and the Caribbean. Edited by Dieter Nohlen. 2005.
- Political handbook of the world 1937. New York, 1938.
- Stokes, William S. Honduras: an area study in government. Madison: University of Wisconsin Press. 1950.
