= 1930 Honduran legislative election =

Legislative elections were held in Honduras in October 1930.

== Results ==
Party	Seats	+/–
National Party	23	–3
Liberal Party	23	+2
Vacant	2	+1
Total	48	0
Source: Political Handbook of the World

== Bibliography ==
- Argueta, Mario. Tiburcio Carías: anatomía de una época, 1923-1948. Tegucigalpa: Editorial Guaymuras. 1989.
- Mariñas Otero, Luis. “La evolución del estado liberal: de la guerra civil a la crisis del 30.” Yankelevich, Pablo, ed. 1990. Honduras. México: Instituto de Investigaciones Dr. José María Mora, Universidad de Guadalajara, Nueva Imagen.
- Political handbook of the world 1931. New York, 1932.
- Stokes, William S. Honduras: an area study in government. Madison: University of Wisconsin Press. 1950.
