= 2001 Honduran general election =

| ← 1997 | 25 November 2001 | 2005 → |
- Presidential election
- Turnout: 66.27% (▼6.43pp)
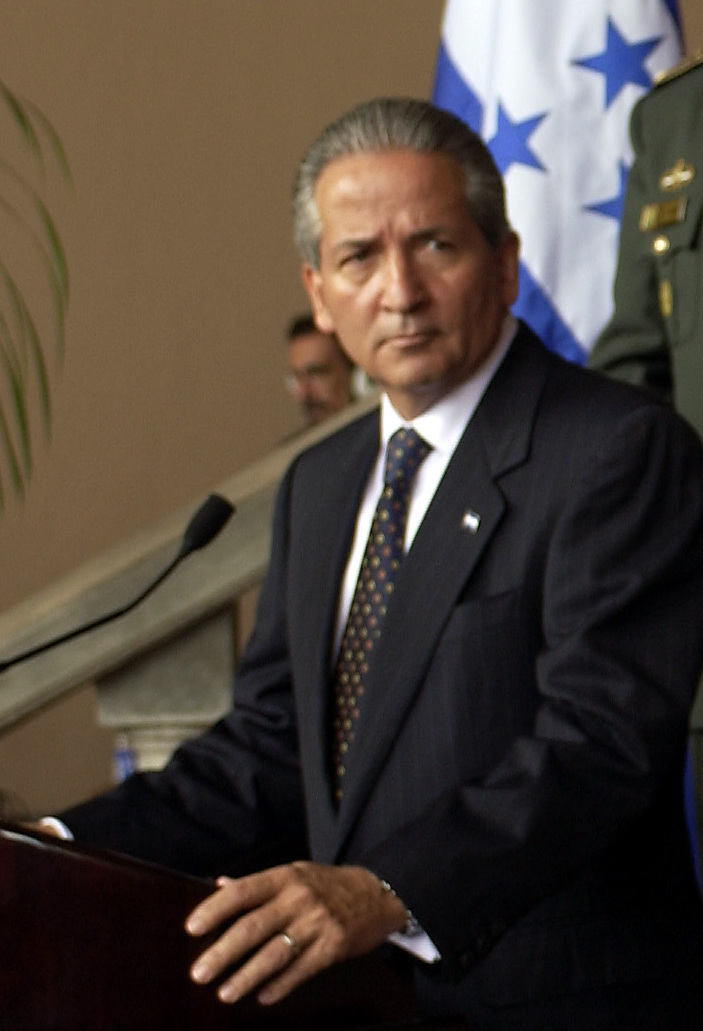
| | | Liberal |
| Nominee | Ricardo Maduro | Rafael Pineda Ponce |
| Party | National | Liberal |
| Popular vote | 1,137,734 | 964,590 |
| Percentage | 52.21% | 44.26% |
- Maduro: 40–50% 50–60% 60–70% Ponce: 40–50% 50–60% 60–70% 70–80% 80–90%
President before election
Carlos Flores
Liberal
Elected President
Ricardo Maduro
National

General elections were held in Honduras to elect a president and parliament on 25 November 2001. Ricardo Maduro of the National Party was elected president with over 50% of the vote, while the National Party emerged as the largest party in the National Congress, winning 61 of the 128 seats.

Closed list PR used to elect Congress.

== Results ==
=== President ===
| Candidate | Party | Votes | % |
|---|---|---|---|
| Ricardo Rodolfo Maduro Joest | National Party | 1,137,734 | 52.21 |
| Rafael Pineda Ponce | Liberal Party | 964,590 | 44.26 |
| Olban Valladares | Innovation and Unity Party–Social-Democracy | 31,666 | 1.45 |
| Matías Funes | Democratic Unification Party | 24,102 | 1.11 |
| Marco Orlando Iriarte | Christian Democratic Party | 21,089 | 0.97 |
| Total | | 2,179,181 | 100.00 |
| Valid votes | | 2,179,181 | 95.37 |
| Invalid votes | | 81,959 | 3.59 |
| Blank votes | | 23,927 | 1.05 |
| Total votes | | 2,285,067 | 100.00 |
| Registered voters/turnout | | 3,448,280 | 66.27 |
Source: CNE

=== National Congress ===
| Party | Votes | % | Seats | +/– |
|---|---|---|---|---|
| National Party | 967,733 | 46.46 | 61 | +6 |
| Liberal Party | 850,290 | 40.82 | 55 | –17 |
| Innovation and Unity Party–Social Democracy | 95,059 | 4.56 | 4 | +1 |
| Democratic Unification Party | 92,818 | 4.46 | 5 | +4 |
| Christian Democratic Party | 76,886 | 3.69 | 3 | +1 |
| Total | 2,082,786 | 100.00 | 128 | –5 |
| Valid votes | 2,082,786 | 91.38 | | |
| Invalid votes | 64,515 | 2.83 | | |
| Blank votes | 132,065 | 5.79 | | |
| Total votes | 2,279,366 | 100.00 | | |
| Registered voters/turnout | 3,437,454 | 66.31 | | |
Source: CNE
