= 1957 Honduran Constituent Assembly election =

Constituent Assembly elections were held in Honduras on 22 September 1957. In November the Assembly elected Ramón Villeda Morales as president.

== Results ==
Party	Votes	%	Seats	+/–
Liberal Party	205,135	61.85	36	+36
National Party	98,088	29.57	18	+18
National Reformist Movement	28,437	8.57	4	New
Total	331,660	100.00	58	0
Registered voters/turnout	522,359	–		
Source: Nohlen

== Aftermath ==
On 16 November the Assembly elected Ramón Villeda Morales as president by a vote of 37 to 20. Following his election, the Liberal Party formed a coalition government with the National Party and the National Reformist Movement, with cabinet portfolios divided on a 6:2:1 ratio. However, the National Party and National Reformist Movement held protests in Tegucigalpa on the day of the presidential vote.

== Bibliography ==
- Anderson, Thomas P. The war of the dispossessed: Honduras and El Salvador, 1969. Lincoln: University of Nebraska Press. 1981.
- Bardales B., Rafael. Historia del Partido Nacional de Honduras. Tegucigalpa: Servicopiax Editores. 1980.
- Becerra, Longino. Evolución histórica de Honduras. Tegucigalpa: Baktun Editorial. 1983.
- Dunkerley, James. Power in the isthmus: a political history of modern Central America. London: Verso. 1988.
- Elections in the Americas A Data Handbook Volume 1. North America, Central America, and the Caribbean. Edited by Dieter Nohlen. 2005.
- Euraque, Darío A. Reinterpreting the banana republic: region and state in Honduras, 1870–1972. Chapel Hill: The University of North Carolina Press. 1996.
- Fernández, Arturo. Partidos políticos y elecciones en Honduras 1980. Tegucigalpa: Editorial Guaymuras. Second edition. 1983.
- Kantor, Harry. Patterns of politics and political systems in Latin America. Chicago: Rand McNally and Company. 1969.
- MacCameron, Robert. Bananas, labor and politics in Honduras: 1954–1963. Syracuse: Syracuse University. 1983.
- Morris, James A. Honduras: caudillo politics and military rulers. Boulder: Westview Press. 1984.
- Parker, Franklin D. The Central American republics. Westport: Greenwood Press. Reprint of 1964 original. 1981.
- Political handbook of the world 1957. New York, 1958.
- Posas, Mario and Rafael del Cid. La construcción del sector público y del estado nacional en Honduras (1876–1979). San José: EDUCA. Second edition. 1983.
- Schulz, Donald E. and Deborah Sundloff Schulz. The United States, Honduras, and the crisis in Central America. Boulder: Westview Press. 1994.
- Vallejo Hernández, Hilario René. Crisis histórica del poder político en Honduras: 168 años de ‘Coquimbos’ y ‘Cachurecos.’ Honduras: Ultra-Graph. 1990.
- Villars, Rina. Para la casa más que para el mundo: sufragismo y feminismo en la historia de Honduras. Tegucigalpa: Editorial Guaymuras. 2001.
