= 1971 Honduran general election =

- 28 March 1971
- Turnout: 67.54% (▲6.13pp)
- Presidential election
Nominee	Ramón Ernesto Cruz	Jorge Bueso Arias
Party	National	Liberal
Popular vote	299,807	269,989
Percentage	52.62%	47.38%
President before election
Oswaldo López Arellano
National
Elected President
Ramón Ernesto Cruz Uclés
National

General elections were held in Honduras on 28 March 1971. Voters went to the polls to elect a new President of the Republic and a new Congress. The two main parties, the National Party and Liberal Party, had agreed before the election to split the Congressional seats equally between them, with each party being awarded 32 of the 64 seats. Additional one seat was to be allocated to the winner of the presidential elections as the president was entitled to one seat in parliament, while both parties were to be equally represented in the Supreme Court in all state institutions including the Government. Ramón Ernesto Cruz Uclés of the National Party won the presidential election with 53% of the vote. Approximately 40% out of total of around 900,000 voters abstained from voting at the elections. Some of the major topics at the elections was the issue of commitment to continued participation in the Central American Common Market and approach to the relations with El Salvador after the Football War.

== Results ==
Party	Presidential candidate	Votes	%	Seats	+/–
National Party	Ramón Ernesto Cruz Uclés	299,807	52.62	32	–3
Liberal Party	Jorge Bueso Arias	269,989	47.38	32	+3
Total		569,796	100.00	64	0
Valid votes		569,796	93.66		
Invalid/blank votes		38,546	6.34		
Total votes		608,342	100.00		
Registered voters/turnout		900,658	67.54		
Source: Nohlen

== Bibliography ==
- Anderson, Thomas P. The war of the dispossessed: Honduras and El Salvador, 1969. Lincoln: University of Nebraska Press. 1981.
- Anderson, Thomas P. Politics in Central America: Guatemala, El Salvador, Honduras, and Nicaragua. New York: Praeger. Revised edition. 1988.
- Bardales B., Rafael. Historia del Partido Nacional de Honduras. Tegucigalpa: Servicopiax Editores. 1980.
- Becerra, Longino. Evolución histórica de Honduras. Tegucigalpa: Baktun Editorial. 1983.
- Bertrand Anduray, María Luisa Soto de. Historia de la mujer hondureña: época independiente. Tegucigalpa: Instituto Hondureño de Cultura Hispánica. 1992.
- Elections in the Americas A Data Handbook Volume 1. North America, Central America, and the Caribbean. Edited by Dieter Nohlen. 2005.
- Euraque, Darío A. Reinterpreting the banana republic: region and state in Honduras, 1870-1972. Chapel Hill: The University of North Carolina Press. 1996.
- Fernández, Arturo. Partidos políticos y elecciones en Honduras 1980. Tegucigalpa: Editorial Guaymuras. Second edition. 1983.
- Haggerty, Richard and Richard Millet. “Historical setting.” Merrill, Tim L., ed. 1995. Honduras: a country study. Washington, D.C.: Federal Research Division, Library of Congress. 1995.
- Leonard, Thomas M. “The quest for Central American democracy since 1945.” Assessing democracy in Latin America. 1998. Boulder: Westview Press. 1998.
- Political handbook of the world 1971. New York, 1972.
- Posas, Mario and Rafael del Cid. La construcción del sector público y del estado nacional en Honduras (1876-1979). San José: EDUCA. Second edition. 1983.
- Rojas Bolaños, Manuel. “La política.” Historia general de Centroamérica. 1994. San José: FLACSO. Volume five. 1994.
- Sabillón Pineda de Flores, Milady. La mujer en los partidos políticos. Tegucigalpa: Alin. 1998.
- Sullivan, Mark P. “Government and politics.” Merrill, Tim L., ed. 1995. Honduras: a country study. Washington, D.C.: Federal Research Division, Library of Congress. 1995.
- Weaver, Frederick Stirton. Inside the volcano: the history and political economy of Central America. Boulder: Westview Press. 1994.
