= Juan Ángel Arias Boquín =

President of Honduras

President of Honduras
- In office 1 February 1903 – 13 April 1903
- Vice President: Máximo Betancourt Rosales
- Preceded by: Terencio Sierra
- Succeeded by: Manuel Bonilla

Personal details
- Born: 1859 Comayagua
- Died: 1927
- Party: Liberal Party of Honduras

Juan Ángel Arias Boquín (7 August 1859 – 29 April 1927) was President of Honduras 1 February – 13 April 1903.

He was Member of the Liberal Party of Honduras. Manuel Bonilla finished first in the elections of 1902 but the Honduran Congress didn't gave him presidency by law, because Manuel Bonilla was an outlaw. Juan Ángel Arias Boquín finished second in the elections of 1902, but when President Terencio Sierra refused to give up the office, the Honduran Congress voted Arias president. After two and a half months in office he was overthrown by General Manuel Bonilla and imprisoned.

== History ==
On 23 February 1903, the political contest between Dr. Marco Aurelio Soto, General Manuel Bonilla (Juticalpa, 1849–1913) and Dr. Juan Angel Arias Boquin (Comayagua, 1859, Guatemala 1927) who at that time lived in Santa Rosa and had been a candidate for president of Honduras, getting away with it and proclaimed President, his opponents will recognize as the "usurper government". Moreover, the General Don Ezequiel Ferrera who had suffered a defeat in Santa Rosa Ocotepeque reached alarming the general population to leave the homes they left the next day due north of the country's leading families, as well as officials municipal and military leaving the town without a head. The time they reached the troops of General Manuel Bonilla they entered without resistance taking the city to their liking. Then the General Ezequiel Ferrera return with an army to deal with the revolutionaries in the town of Talgua, after hours of fighting, General Ferrera was defeated and killed.

== Footnotes ==
Political offices
| Preceded by Terencio Sierra | President of Honduras; 1903 | Succeeded by Manuel Bonilla |
