= Miguel Andonie Fernández =

Honduran pharmacologist

Miguel Andonie Fernández (30 October 1921 in Gualala, Santa Bárbara – 30 November 2013) was a Honduran chemist, pharmacologist, academic, politician and businessman of paternal Palestinian origin. He was associated with the Colegio de Químicos y Farmacéuticos. He was the chairman of Multimedia, SA and a real estate investor, and invested much in a chain of pharmacies in Honduras. He owned one of Honduras's most notable radio stations, Radio America. The National Congress of Honduras awarded him the Honor of Merit for his contributions to politics and science.
