= Roberto Suazo Córdova =

29th President of Honduras (1982-1986)

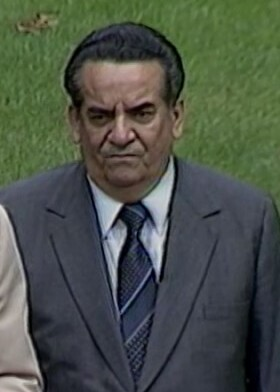
- Cordova in 1982

29th President of Honduras
- In office 27 January 1982 – 27 January 1986
- Vice President: Marcelino Ponce Martínez
- Preceded by: Policarpo Paz García (provisional)
- Succeeded by: José Azcona del Hoyo

Personal details
- Born: 17 March 1927 La Paz, La Paz, Honduras
- Died: 22 December 2018 (aged 91) Tegucigalpa, Honduras
- Party: Liberal Party of Honduras
- Spouse: Aida Zacapa (died 2008)
- Education: University of San Carlos of Guatemala
- Profession: Politician; surgeon; physician

Roberto Suazo Córdova (17 March 1927 – 22 December 2018) was the 29th President of Honduras from 27 January 1982 until 27 January 1986. Suazo Córdova died on 22 December 2018 following an ulcer surgical operation at the age of 91.

== Presidency (1982–1986) ==
In 1981, Suazo Córdova was the President of the National Constituent Assembly that drew up the 1982 Honduran Constitution. He won a clear majority as a member of the Liberal Party of Honduras and became president in January 1982. The Liberal victory surprised many who believed the armed forces would interfere in favor of its erstwhile National Party allies. Colonel Gustavo Álvarez Martínez became head of the armed forces. The Reagan administration put heavy pressure on Honduras to assist in U.S. efforts against the Nicaragua's Sandinistas and El Salvador's guerrillas operating in Honduras. A U.S. military spokesman neatly summarized the U.S. appraisal of the situation: "Honduras is the keystone to our policy down there". Suazo and Alvarez accepted U.S. troops on continuous "maneuvers", the construction and expansion of military bases and facilities, and even U.S. training of Salvadoran troops within Honduras. Honduras provided sanctuary and overt cooperation to the Contra army the United States was developing to attack Nicaragua's Sandinista government. Honduras thus became the active ally of the U.S. military strategy for Nicaragua and El Salvador. The country was described at the time as an aircraft carrier—the "USS Honduras". In exchange, Honduras received hundreds of millions of dollars in U.S. assistance—especially military aid.

Political offices
Preceded by Policarpo Paz (Provisional)	President of Honduras; 1982–1986	Succeeded by José Azcona
