= Rafael Leonardo Callejas Romero =

31st President of Honduras (1990–1994)

Rafael Callejas
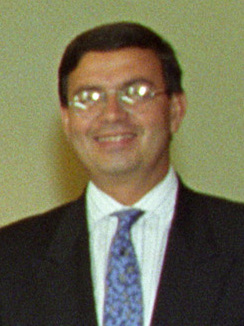
- Callejas Romero in 1993

31st President of Honduras
- In office 27 January 1990 – 27 January 1994
- Vice President: Jacobo Hernández Cruz
- Preceded by: José Azcona del Hoyo
- Succeeded by: Carlos Roberto Reina

Personal details
- Born: Rafael Leonardo Callejas Romero; 14 November 1943 Tegucigalpa, Honduras
- Died: 4 April 2020 (aged 76) Atlanta, Georgia, U.S.
- Resting place: Jardines de Paz Suyapa, Tegucigalpa
- Party: National Party of Honduras
- Spouse: Norma Gaborit
- Education: Mississippi State University (BEc)
- Profession: Businessman, politician

Rafael Leonardo Callejas Romero (14 November 1943 – 4 April 2020) was the 31st President of Honduras from 27 January 1990 to 27 January 1994, representing the National Party of Honduras (PNH).

== Early life and education ==
Callejas was born on 14 November 1943 in Tegucigalpa in Honduras. He studied agricultural economics at Mississippi State University becoming an expert on financial and economic issues connected to agronomy. At Mississippi State University, Callejas earned a Bachelor of Science degree in 1965 and a Masters of Science degree in 1966. Also in 1966, Mississippi State University's Department of Agricultural Economics published Callejas' thesis titled Hog Production Opportunities in Mississippi. In 1990, Callejas was named Mississippi State University's Alumni of the Year and was invited along with U.S. Vice President Dan Quayle to deliver the university's commencement address.

== Career ==
Between 1967 and 1971 Callejas worked at the Council for Economic Planning (CONSUPLANE). In 1968, Callejas was made the Director of Economic Planning by the then President Oswaldo López. in 1975 another General and President, Juan Alberto Melgar, named Callejas Minister for Agriculture and Natural Resources. When another general and President Policarpo Paz took over in a coup in 1978, Callejas remained in this post. During the transition to democracy culminating in November 1981 elections, which were won by the Liberal Party of Honduras (PLH), he rose within the ranks of the National Party of Honduras (PNH), and in 1982 presided over their central committee. He supported former President Ricardo Maduro's Unidad y Cambio (Unity and Change) movement within the PNH that brought the party more towards the center, and a liberal economic path. Callejas then created his own faction, the Movimiento Nacional Callejista (National Callejista Movement), to advance his candidature in the 1985 presidential elections. At the time both main political parties allowed various candidates to stand, and while Callejas gained the highest vote of any candidate with 42.6%, the PLH candidates gained 51.5% of the total vote, and therefore it was their most voted for candidate, José Azcona del Hoyo, with 27.5% of the vote, who became president.

== Football ==
Until 2015, Callejas was President of the Federación Nacional Autónoma de Fútbol de Honduras (FENAFUTH). Under his tenure, Honduras qualified for the FIFA World Cups in 2010 and 2014, the first time Honduras qualified for two consecutive World Cups. During his tenure, Honduras qualified for all major football soccer competitions in all age brackets, including the Summer Olympics.

== Presidency (1990–1994) ==
His election in 1989 marked the first time since 1932 that power was transferred peacefully between Honduras' two major parties.

Callejas was once again the PNH candidate in the 1989 elections where a reported 200,000 identifications from deceased Honduran citizens were used. Callejas won with 52.3% of the votes, becoming the first PNH President since 1972. He had to confront severe economic problems, and he followed the advice of the International Monetary Fund (IMF) by cutting public spending, resulting in many public servants being laid off, and by devaluing the Lempira. At the time of the devaluation of the Lempira, the Honduran Central Bank, presided over at the time by Ricardo Maduro Joest, did not have any dollars available to the general public. Instead, people were given back devalued Lempiras causing a great deal of hardship in what was already one of the poorest countries in the western hemisphere. Gasoline supplies were non-existent when he took office and long lines of cars were seen at the gas stations trying to obtain fuel. This led to many strikes and a lot of social agitation, until his government successfully negotiated with the United States the write-off of a $US430 million debt, in September 1991.

He presided over a liberal reformist government, opened the Honduran economy to local and foreign investment and managed steady growth during the last three years of his presidency, although during the fourth year of his term fiscal indiscipline led to a new set of economic measures being imposed by the following government. Poverty was reduced by 8% under his tenure. Infrastructure was a priority and large investments in the rich Sula Valley area were made resulting in more than 90 kilometers of four-lane highways.

His government had some important accomplishments in the social area, such as the creation of the Family Assistance Program (PRAF) and the Honduran Fund for Social Investment (FHIS). Expatriates of the previous Military and Liberal governments were allowed to return to Honduras, with no risk to their lives, and the irregular forces of the Nicaraguan counter-revolutionaries, the Contras, were required to leave Honduras in April 1990 after intense negotiations.

== Accusations ==
Callejas was accused of seven counts of corruption during his term. He was also accused by an aide in the George H. W. Bush administration, resulting in a Bush executive order denying him U.S. visa status.

In 2005, the Honduran Congress revoked the law by which ex-Presidents, among other former officials, had legal immunity. Callejas voluntarily presented himself to court (first person to do so after the law was revoked). Callejas then faced trial. He was acquitted by the Honduran Judiciary of all of the counts which were presented against him.

On 3 December 2015, Callejas was indicted in U.S. Federal Court in connection with the ongoing 2015 FIFA Corruption Case. 12 days later, he flew to the United States and was taken into custody. A few days later, he was released on bond. He was represented by the noted criminal defense attorney Manuel Retureta of Retureta & Wassem, PLLC in Washington, DC. On 27 March 2016, he pleaded guilty to accepting $500,000 in bribes in 2012 to be shared with another football official.

In December 2016, Callejas was banned for life by the FIFA Ethics Committee.

== Death ==
Callejas died on 4 April 2020 of leukemia.

== Publications ==
- Hog Production Opportunities in Mississippi, Mississippi State University Department of Agricultural Economics, (Starkville, MS), 1966.
- Plan de Gobierno, 1990-1994: cambio : participación, bienestar y dignidad nacional, República de Honduras, (Tegucigalpa, Honduras), 1990.
- Declaración del Gobierno de la República de Honduras sobre la prevención y el control del alcoholismo, la drogadicción y la farmacodependencia, Instituto Hondureño para la Prevención del Alcoholismo, Drogadicción y Farmacodependencia, República de Honduras, (Tegucigalpa, Honduras), 1990.
- La Modernización del Estado: Exposiciones del Presidente de la República y los cuatro candidatos a la Presidencia, lunes 5 de julio de 1993, República de Honduras, (Tegucigalpa, Honduras), 1993.
- Las Relaciones Entre Chile y Honduras: nuevas perspectivas a la luz del proceso de paz en Centroamérica, Consejo Chileno para las Relaciones Internacionales, (Tegucigalpa, Honduras), 1993.

Political offices
Preceded by José Azcona del Hoyo	President of Honduras; 1990–1994	Succeeded by Carlos Roberto Reina
