= Carlos Roberto Reina =

President of Honduras from 1994 to 1998

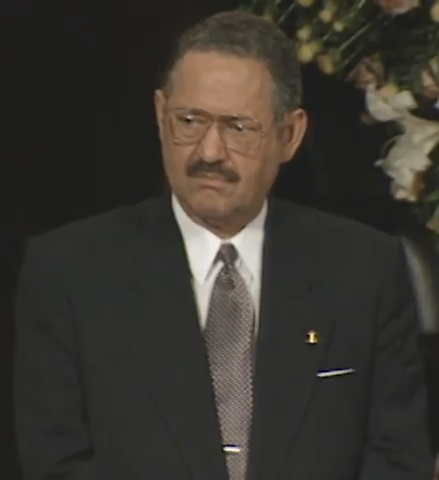
- Reina in 1997

President of Honduras
- In office 27 January 1994 – 27 January 1998
- Vice President: Walter López Reyes
- Preceded by: Rafael Leonardo Callejas
- Succeeded by: Carlos Roberto Flores

Personal details
- Born: Carlos Roberto Reina Idiáquez; 13 March 1926 Comayagüela, Francisco Morazán Department, Honduras
- Died: 19 August 2003 (aged 77) Tegucigalpa, Honduras
- Party: Liberal Party of Honduras
- Spouse: Bessie Watson
- Profession: Lawyer, diplomat, politician

Carlos Roberto Reina Idiáquez (13 March 1926 – 19 August 2003) was a Honduran politician, lawyer and diplomat who served as the President of Honduras from 1994 to 1998. He was a member of the Honduran Liberal Party.

== Background ==
He was born in the city of Comayagüela, Honduras. His wife, Bessie Watson, was an American citizen with whom he had two daughters. He completed university studies in the National Autonomous University of Honduras where he earned a bachelor's degree in Juridical and Social Sciences. Later, Reina continued his postgraduate studies in the and cities of London and Paris.

== Political career ==
Throughout his long political career Reina held a number of political governmental and international jobs, including judge in the court of Tegucigalpa, peace member of the international court of The Hague, Ambassador of Honduras to France, and president of the Central Executive Council (CCE) of the Liberal Party, among other important positions.

Reina was arrested several times for his political activities in opposition to the military governments during his younger years. The first time was in 1944 for protesting against dictator Tiburcio Carías. Later in the 1960s he was sent to prison twice by General Oswaldo López, who had taken over the Honduran government through the use of military force. This led Reina to become a fierce defender of human rights throughout the rest of his life. In 1979, he was nominated president of the Inter-American Court of Human Rights of the Organization of American States.

== Presidency (1994–1998) ==
Carlos Reina became president in November 1993, with the Liberal Party of Honduras (PLH, Partido Liberal de Honduras), after defeating Oswaldo Ramos, the candidate of the National Party of Honduras with 56% of the vote. He was accompanied by his vice presidential candidate: retired General Walter López, Juan de la Cruz Avelar and Guadalupe Jerezano Mejía.

On 27 January 1994, Reina replaced president Rafael Leonardo Callejas. Reina inherited a relatively difficult economic situation from the existing nationalist administration. Foreign debt weighed heavily on the economy of the country: debt service represented 40% of Honduran exports. Even though approximately 700 million dollars were condoned to Honduras, the debt 'was' still higher than that it had been at the beginnings of 1990.

In his first presidential speech Reina launched his moral revolution: " I pledge my word of honor before God, before the people and before history, that we will go forward in this enterprise that we have imposed upon ourselves. We will defeat corruption; we will give currency to social liberalism. We will see the moral revolution to its end." The issue of whether his plan was a success or a failure is still highly controversial.

One of Carlos Roberto Reina's main objectives during his government was the reform of the Armed Forces. His reforms were mostly realized by the end of his first year in office. The first one was the total transfer of all power in hands of military men to civilian authorities, followed by the abolition of compulsory military service in the country. These and other reforms to the military are also controversial to the ruling elites, they believed it fomented gangs, by eliminating a source of employment and education for young men.

In July 1996, Reina was awarded the Order of Brilliant Jade by Lee Teng-hui, President of the Republic of China.

== Post-presidency and death ==
Carlos Roberto Reina finished his presidency on 27 January 1998. Later, in October 1998, Reina began his period as president of the Central American Parliament (Parlacén), where he remained until 28 October 1999. Finally on 19 August 2003, Carlos Roberto Reina killed himself with a gunshot at the age of 77. His brother revealed that Reina was suffering from health issues relating to the gallbladder and pancreas.

== See also ==
- History of Honduras

Political offices
Preceded by Rafael Leonardo Callejas	President of Honduras; 1994–1998	Succeeded by Carlos Roberto Flores
