= José Azcona del Hoyo =

President of Honduras from 1986 to 1990

José Azcona
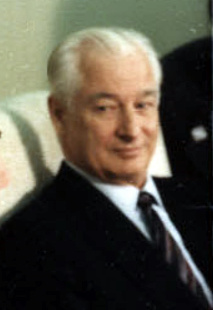
- Azcona in 1987

President of Honduras
- In office 27 January 1986 – 27 January 1990
- Vice President: José Pineda Gómez
- Preceded by: Roberto Suazo Córdova
- Succeeded by: Rafael Leonardo Callejas

Personal details
- Born: José Simón Azcona del Hoyo; 26 January 1927 La Ceiba, Atlántida Department, Honduras
- Died: 24 October 2005 (aged 78) Tegucigalpa, Honduras
- Party: Liberal Party of Honduras
- Spouse: Miriam Bocock
- Education: University of Monterrey
- Profession: Businessman, politician

José Simón Azcona del Hoyo (26 January 1927 – 24 October 2005) was President of Honduras from 27 January 1986 to 27 January 1990 for the Liberal Party of Honduras (PLH). He was born in La Ceiba in Honduras.

== Early life and career ==
Azcona spent the years from 1935 to 1949 living in Cantabria, Spain with his maternal grandparents. He grew up there during the Spanish Civil War. He returned to Honduras in 1949, working in his family's trading company. He then went to study in the National Autonomous University of Honduras (UNAH) graduating in civil engineering, with postgraduate studies from the University of Monterrey in Mexico.

== Presidency (1986–1990) ==
As the PLH were unable to decide on a single candidate they ended up fielding four candidates, including Azcona, against the one National Party of Honduras (PNH) candidate Rafael Leonardo Callejas Romero. Because the PLH candidates gained 51.5% of the vote between them, and as Azcona gained the highest of the 4, he gained the presidency with only 27.5% of the vote, even though Callejas gained 42.6% of the vote. This was the first transfer of power from one constitutional, elected president to another since 1948, and the first time it happened democratically since 1932.

Azcona's success as a president has been contested across the political spectrum. While his followers and a large proportion of the population would favour him due to the perceived honesty and integrity of his government, another group would challenge this view, arguing that he pursued a weak economic policy (artificially maintaining a 2:1 exchange rate between the Honduran lempira and the US dollar), ran up large budget deficits and did little to develop investment opportunities in the country. Many people still remember the fuel supply problems, mostly in the last part of his government due to foreign credit issues.

During his presidency, the Central American peace process took place, by the time he turned over the presidency to his successor on 27 January 1990 the Contra rebels in Nicaragua were demobilising. Less known is the relationship between Honduras and the US Government covert operations to exchange arms for hostages in Iran and fund rebels, later known as The Iran Contra Affair.

== Post-presidency ==
After leaving power Azcona concentrated on running his construction business. At the end of the nineties he had a heart attack. On 24 October 2005 at 12.30 a.m. (local time UTC−6) just as he was going to bed in his home in Tegucigalpa, Azcona died suddenly from another heart attack, at the age of 78.

== Trivia ==
- Azcona's last trip was to Pensacola, Florida where he met with his wife's (Miriam Bocock de Azcona) side of the family before he died.
- His son José Azcona Bocock is currently an elected Congressman.
- His daughter Elizabeth Azcona Bocock was Minister of Industry and Commerce for the first half of Mel Zelaya's presidency.

Political offices
Preceded by Roberto Suazo Córdova	President of Honduras; 1986–1990	Succeeded by Rafael Leonardo Callejas
