= Liberal Party of Honduras =

Liberal Party of Honduras Partido Liberal de Honduras
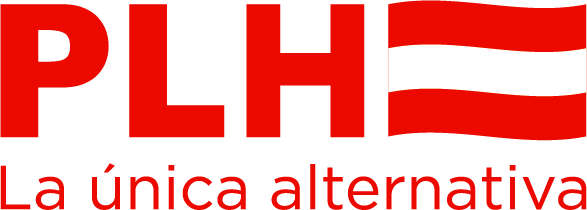
- President: Roberto Contreras Mendoza
- Founder: Policarpo Bonilla
- Founded: 5 February 1891
- Headquarters: Tegucigalpa, MDC
- Ideology: Conservatism
- Political position: Centre-right
- Regional affiliation: Center-Democratic Integration Group
- Continental affiliation: RELIAL; COPPPAL
- International affiliation: Liberal International
- Colours: Red
- Anthem: "Himno del Partido Liberal de Honduras" "Hymn of the Liberal Party of Honduras"
- National Congress: 41 / 128

Party flag

Website
- www.partidoliberal.hn

The Liberal Party of Honduras (Spanish: Partido Liberal de Honduras) is a centre-right conservative Honduran political party that was founded in 1891. It is the oldest existent political party in the country; further, it is one of the two main parties that have, until recently, dominated Honduran politics. The party is a member of the Liberal International. The PLH is identified with the colors red and white, as the flag Francisco Morazán used in most of his military campaigns during the time of the Federal Republic of Central America.

The party is against the legalization of abortion, which is punishable by imprisonment in Honduras.

== History ==
=== Early years ===
The Liberal Party emerged from the political and economic rivalries that dominated Honduras during the 19th century. The country’s liberal and conservative factions were less ideologically distinct than their labels suggest; instead, they were vehicles for elites competing for control over limited state resources. Early Honduran elections were marked by frequent outbreaks of violence, with defeated factions often resorting to armed conflict. These struggles hindered economic development, as governmental resources were frequently diverted to fund military campaigns and settle wartime debts. By the early 20th century, the Liberal Party had become firmly entrenched as one of the two main political parties, alongside the newly formed National Party of Honduras, a splinter group created by dissatisfied PLH members. The bipartite political system took shape during this period, with both parties backed by foreign interests, particularly the powerful American-owned banana companies that dominated the Honduran economy. While these companies initially supported both parties, a merger in 1929 resulted in the PNH securing a greater share of their financial backing, giving the PNH an advantage during this critical period.

=== The Cariato Regime (1932–1949) ===
The rise of General Tiburcio Carías Andino and his establishment of a civilian dictatorship, colloquially referred to as the "Cariato", marked a significant setback for democratic politics in Honduras. The PLH, with David Masso Hernández as its top leader, declared itself a party of the Democratic Left in 1932, thus maintaining its ideology of social liberalism or center-left until the end of the 20th century. Carías, a member of the PNH, ruled with an iron grip from 1932 to 1949, suppressing political opposition and stifling the PLH. Many Liberal leaders were forced into exile, but despite this, the party survived.

=== Post-Cariato and the return to power (1949–1963) ===
When the "Cariato" ended, the PLH returned to the electoral arena with an ascendant liberal faction. The PLH won at the 1954 Honduran general election, but a political deadlock resulted in a crisis culminating in a coup. The Liberal presidential candidate and winner of the 1954 elections, Ramón Villeda Morales, was finally made president in 1957, but his administration ended prematurely due to the 1963 Honduran coup d'état.

=== Military dictatorship (1963–1982) ===
Military supremacy over politics was consolidated after the 1963 coup, and military officers occupied the presidency save for the brief civilian administration of Ramón Ernesto Cruz Uclés of the PNH, during 1971–1972. Despite the military dictatorship, the Liberal party or its leaders were not outright banned. The party, along with the National Party and the United States began putting pressure on the military to begin a transition back to civilian administration, which was finally realized in 1982.

=== 2005 elections ===
The PLH won the closely contested 2005 presidential race, but at the moment the PNH has a majority in the National Congress due to an alliance with the Christian Democrats (Democracia Cristiana).

In the general election of 27 November 2005, the party won 62 out of 128 seats in the National Congress; and its presidential candidate, Manuel Zelaya, polled 49.9% to defeat the PNH's Porfirio Pepe Lobo, restoring the PLH as the presidential party. He was inaugurated on 27 January 2006.

Elected as a liberal, Zelaya shifted dramatically to the political left and socialism during his presidency, forging an alliance with the Hugo Chávez-linked ALBA, angering conservatives and his own Liberal Party. He was deposed by a coup d'état in 2009 and replaced by Roberto Micheletti, also of the Liberal Party.

=== 2009 elections ===
At the 2009 elections, which took place after the 2009 Honduran coup d'état that removed Manuel Zelaya from power, the Liberal Party suffered a heavy defeat by the National Party, with the Nationals' candidate for president, Porfirio Lobo Sosa, winning the presidency with (according to the Electoral Tribunal) over 1,212,846 votes and 56.56% of the national total of valid votes (in all participation as acknowledged by the tribunal was of 41%) compared with 816,874 votes and 38.1% of the national total for Liberal candidate Elvin Santos. In the elections for the National Congress of Honduras the Liberal Party won a total of 45 seats, dropping from its previous 61. The elections were held under a tense political atmosphere without the accustomed OAS observers and under a decree restricting civil rights with the elected president Zelaya under military siege in the Brazilian embassy at Tegucigalpa. Sectors opposed to the 2009 coup claim the participation was much less than reported by the authorities, but this claim has not been verified.

In 2011, Zelaya's supporters left the Liberal Party and founded Liberty and Refoundation.

=== Recent activities ===
Following Zelaya's split, the Liberal Party saw a decline in its support, with Liberty and Refoundation becoming the National Party's main rival. At the 2013 election, liberal candidate Mauricio Villeda got 20.3% of votes, finishing third.

The party further declined in the 2017 election; its candidate Luis Zelaya only obtained 14.74% of the vote, and again finished third. However, the party maintained its 26 seats in the parliament. The Liberal Party denounced the result as fraudulent.

The party's popularity continued declining into the 2021 election. Its nominee for president, Yani Rosenthal, a member of the historically powerful Rosenthal family in Honduras, won only 10% of the vote. This was the worst result for the Liberal Party in any election it has participated since its founding in 1891, a sign of growing discontent among the population with the two traditional parties of Honduras.

In the 2025 election, the party rebounded, with Salvador Nasralla having been selected as its nominee for president during party primaries. Nasralla had previously served as the Liberty and Refoundation candidate in the 2017 elections.

== Electoral results ==
=== Presidential elections ===
Election	Party candidate	Votes	%	Result
1891	Policarpo Bonilla	15,300	30.81%	Lost ✗
1894	Policarpo Bonilla	42,667	98.84%	Elected ✓
1898	Terencio Sierra	36,756	82.53%	Elected ✓
1902	Juan Ángel Arias Boquín	25,118	42.9%	Lost ✗
1919	Rafael López Gutiérrez	79,068	81.0%	Elected ✓
1923	Juan Ángel Arias	20,424	19.4%	Lost ✗
1924	Did not run			
1928	Vicente Mejía Colindres	62,319	56.62%	Elected ✓
1932	Ángel Zúñiga Huete	61,643	56.85%	Lost ✗
1948	Ángel Zúñiga Huete	210	00.08%	Lost ✗
1954	Ramón Villeda Morales	121,213	48.10%	Elected ✓
1957	Ramón Villeda Morales	205,135	61.85%	Elected ✓
1971	Jorge Bueso Arias	269,989	47.38%	Lost ✗
1981	Roberto Suazo Cordova	636,437	53.9%	Elected ✓
1985	José Simón Azcona del Hoyo	786,624	51.02%	Elected ✓
1989	Carlos Roberto Flores Facussé	776,698	44.33%	Lost ✗
1993	Carlos Roberto Reina	906,793	53.01%	Elected ✓
1997	Carlos Roberto Flores Facussé	1,040,403	52.65%	Elected ✓
2001	Rafael Pineda Ponce	962,446	44.2%	Lost ✗
2005	Manuel Zelaya	999,006	45.6%	Elected ✓
2009	Elvin Santos	816,874	38.10%	Lost ✗
2013	Mauricio Villeda	632,320	20.30%	Lost ✗
2017	Luis Orlando Zelaya	484,187	14.74%	Lost ✗
2021	Yani Rosenthal	335,762	10.00%	Lost ✗
2025	Salvador Nasralla	1,455,076	39.54%	Lost ✗

==== Note ====
In the 1957 election, Ramón Villeda Morales was elected by the Constituent Assembly.

=== National Congress elections ===
Election	Votes	%	Seats	+/–	Position
1923			9 / 48	▲9	▲3rd
1924			0 / 46	▼9	▲2nd
1926			6 / 46	▲6	▲2nd
1928			21 / 48	▲15	▲2nd
1930			23 / 48	▲2	▲2nd
1932			13 / 56	▼10	▲2nd
1934			4 / 59	▼9	▲2nd
1936	46	0.01%	0 / 59	▼4	▲2nd
1942			0 / 45	Steady	▲2nd
1948	210	0.08%	0 / 49	Steady	▲2nd
1954	121,213	48.10%	24 / 59	▲24	▲1st
1956	41,724	10.08%	0 / 58	▼24	▼2nd
1957	205,135	61.85%	36 / 58	▲36	▲1st
1965	272,198	44.85%	29 / 64	▼7	▼2nd
1971	269,989	47.38%	32 / 64	▲3	▼2nd
1980	495,779	51.68%	35 / 71	▲2	▲1st
1981	636,437	53.9%	44 / 82	▲9	▲1st
1985	786,624	51.02%	67 / 134	▲23	▲1st
1989	776,698	44.33%	51 / 128	▼16	▼2nd
1993	906,793	53.01%	71 / 128	▲20	▲1st
1997	1,040,403	52.65%	67 / 128	▼4	▲1st
2001	850,290	40.8%	55 / 128	▼12	▼2nd
2005	7,746,806	44.84%	62 / 128	▲7	▲1st
2009	4,937,995	30.78%	45 / 128	▼17	▼2nd
2013	4,670,157	16.97%	27 / 128	▼18	▼3rd
2017		20.31%	26 / 128	▼1	▼3rd
2021	3,531,887	11.14%	22 / 128	▼4	▼4th
2025	6,988,261	34.55%	41 / 128	▲19	▲2nd

== See also ==
- Liberalism worldwide
- List of liberal parties
- Liberalism in Honduras
