= National Party of Honduras =

Political party in Honduras

National Party of Honduras Partido Nacional de Honduras
- Abbreviation: PNH
- President: Nasry Asfura
- Secretary-General: Tomás Zambrano
- Founded: 27 February 1902; 124 years ago
- Headquarters: Tegucigalpa
- Youth wing: Nationalist Youth (Juventud Nacionalista)
- Ideology: Conservatism; Neoliberalism; Right-wing populism; Nationalism; Social conservatism; Christian democracy; Anti-communism
- Political position: Right-wing
- International affiliation: Centrist Democrat International (observer); International Democracy Union (formerly)
- Regional affiliation: Union of Latin American Parties; Christian Democrat Organization of America
- Colours: Blue
- Anthem: "Estandartes Azules" ('Blue Guidons')
- National Congress: 49 / 128

Election symbol

Party flag

Website
- www.partidonacional.hn

The National Party of Honduras (PNH; Spanish: Partido Nacional de Honduras) is a conservative political party in Honduras founded on 27 February 1902, by Manuel Bonilla Chirinos. Historically it has been one of the two most influential parties in the country. The party's platform is based on Christian humanist doctrine, and its five main principles are common wealth, dignity of the human person, equality, solidarity and subsidiarity.

Since the foundation of the National Party, Honduras has had 14 PNH presidents. Manuel Bonilla was the first (1903–1907), and the most recent is the president, Nasry Asfura, who has served since January 2026. The party was the ruling directive of the National Congress from 2009 to 2022 and currently holds mayoralties of most of the country's municipalities.

== History ==
The ideology of the party can be traced back to national hero José Trinidad Cabañas's principles and thinking. Cabañas believed in a strong sense of patriotism, and that national interest was over any other interest. Moreover, in the late 1800s, actors such as Ponciano Leiva and Luis Bogran made efforts to conform an institution which reflected their ideology.

The Progressive Party, led by Ponciano Leiva, joined forces by a movement led by General Manuel Bonilla. On 27 February 1902, in Tegucigalpa, both parties united to form the National Convention, backed by 40,000 signatures from supporters. That event was the birth of the National Party of Honduras.

== Symbols ==
=== Seal ===
Fraternity, equality and justice are reflected in the official seal. Holding arms represent fraternity among Honduran citizens. The scale represents equality between men and women. The burning torch shines defending those in need. The seal also states the party's motto: Social Justice with Liberty and Democracy.

== Organic structure ==
1. National Convention: Made up from Municipal, State, Regional and national authorities.
2. Permanent Commission: Permanent members of the National Convention
3. National Committee: Political Commission, Justice Party, Financial and Budget Administration, Political and Ideological Formation
4. State Committee: Conformed by the authorities of each of the 18 departments in Honduras
5. Local Committee: Counts with Municipal Representation

== Electoral history ==
=== Presidential elections ===
Election	Party candidate	Votes	%	Result
1902	Manuel Bonilla	28,550	48.7%	Elected ✓
1916	Francisco Bertrand	77,832	100%	Elected ✓
1923	Tiburcio Carías Andino	49,541	47.1%	Elected ✓
1924	Miguel Paz Barahona	72,021	99%	Elected ✓
1928	Tiburcio Carías Andino	47,745	43.38%	Lost ✗
1932	Tiburcio Carías Andino	81,211		Elected ✓
1936	Tiburcio Carías Andino	Elected by Constituent Assembly ✓		
1939	Tiburcio Carías Andino	Elected by Congress ✓		
1948	Juan Manuel Gálvez	254,802	99.85%	Elected ✓
1954	Tiburcio Carías Andino	77,726	30.85%	Lost ✗
1971	Ramón Ernesto Cruz Uclés	299,807	49.28%	Elected ✓
1981	Ricardo Zuñiga	491,089	40.43%	Lost ✗
1985	Rafael Leonardo Callejas Romero	701,406	45.49%	Lost ✗
1989	Rafael Leonardo Callejas Romero	916,131	52.29%	Elected ✓
1993	Oswaldo Ramos Soto	735,123	42.97%	Lost ✗
1997	Nora Gúnera de Melgar	844,985	42.76%	Lost ✗
2001	Ricardo Maduro	1,135,565	52.22%	Elected ✓
2005	Porfirio Lobo Sosa	925,243	42.15%	Lost ✗
2009	Porfirio Lobo Sosa	1,212,846	56.56%	Elected ✓
2013	Juan Orlando Hernández	1,149,302	36.89%	Elected ✓
2017	Juan Orlando Hernández	1,410,888	42.95%	Elected ✓
2021	Nasry Asfura	1,240,260	36.93%	Lost ✗
2025	Nasry Asfura	1,481,414	40.26%	Elected ✓

=== National Congress elections ===
Election	Votes	%	Seats	+/–	Position
1923			15 / 48	▲15	▲2nd
1924			46 / 46	▲31	▲1st
1926			36 / 46	▼10	▲1st
1928			26 / 48	▼10	▲1st
1930			23 / 48	▼3	▲1st
1932			43 / 56	▲20	▲1st
1934			55 / 59	▲12	▲1st
1936	132,948	99.99%	59 / 59	▲4	▲1st
1942			45 / 45	▼14	▲1st
1948	254,802	99.85%	49 / 49	▲4	▲1st
1954	77,726	30.85%	23 / 59	▼26	▼2nd
1956	2,003	00.48%	0 / 58	▼23	▼3rd
1957	98,088	29.57%	18 / 58	▲18	▲2nd
1965	334,646	55.15%	35 / 64	▲17	▲1st
1971	299,807	52.62%	32 / 64	▼3	▲1st
1980	423,623	44.15%	33 / 71	▲1	▼2nd
1981	491,089	41.6%	34 / 82	▲1	▼2nd
1985	701,406	45.49%	63 / 134	▲29	▼2nd
1989	916,131	52.29%	76 / 128	▲13	▲1st
1993	735,123	42.97%	55 / 128	▼21	▼2nd
1997	844,985	42.76%	55 / 128	Steady	▼2nd
2001	967,733	46.46%	61 / 128	▲6	▲1st
2005	6,983,056	40.42%	55 / 128	▼6	▼2nd
2009	8,561,577	53.37%	71 / 128	▲16	▲1st
2013	9,255,904	33.64%	48 / 128	▼23	▲1st
2017		47.66%	61 / 128	▲13	▲1st
2021	9,573,029	30.18%	44 / 128	▼17	▼2nd
2025	7,138,761	35.29%	49 / 128	▲5	▲1st

== Controversies ==
The National Party has been involved in the last few years on several issues of corruption. In 2015, it was discovered that the National Party was using money from the Honduran Social Security in order to finance the campaign of President Juan Orlando Hernandez through an elaborate scheme of companies redirecting Social Security funds to the party. After the scheme was discovered, the President said the money should be returned by the party.

Former President Porfirio Lobo was accused in March 2017 by the New York's DA office for helping protect drug organizations.

In April 2022, former president of Honduras, Juan Orlando Hernández, who served two terms between 2014 and January 2022, was extradited to the United States to face charges of drug trafficking and money laundering. In March 2024, a federal jury returned three guilty verdicts against Hernandez and, in June, he was sentenced to 45 years in prison. However, President Donald Trump pardoned him in November 2025, meaning he was freed from the prison.

== Party leaders ==
=== List of presidents ===
President of the National Party
- President(e/a) del Partido Nacional

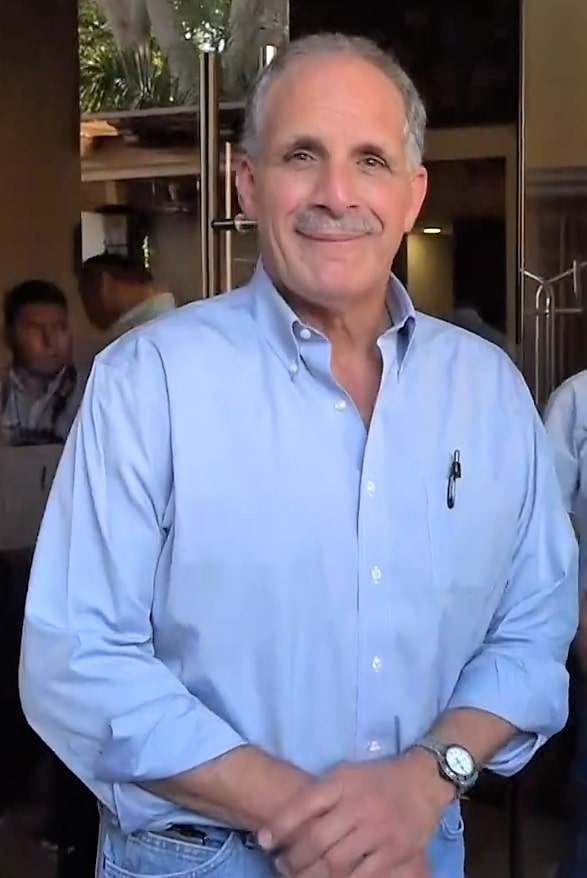
- Incumbent; Nasry Asfura since 24 May 2025
- Formation: Unknown
- First holder: Unknown

No.	President (Birth–Death)	Term of office		Notes
1	David Chávez (born 1982)	23 May 2021	24 May 2025	
2	Nasry Asfura (born 1958)	24 May 2025	Incumbent	Incumbent

== See also ==
- List of conservative parties by country
