= List of political parties in Honduras =

Honduras traditionally had a two-party system, dominated by the Liberal Party of Honduras and the National Party of Honduras.

== The parties ==
=== Parliamentary parties ===
Party	Abbreviation	Ideology	Deputies
Liberty and Refoundation; Partido Libertad y Refundación	LIBRE	Democratic socialism	35 / 128
National Party of Honduras; Partido Nacional de Honduras	PNH	Conservatism	49 / 128
Liberal Party of Honduras; Partido Liberal de Honduras	PLH	Liberalism	41 / 128
Christian Democratic Party of Honduras; Partido Demócrata Cristiano de Honduras	DC	Christian democracy	1 / 128
Innovation and Unity Party; Partido Innovación y Unidad	PINU-SD	Social democracy	2 / 128

=== Parties without representation in Parliament ===
- We All Are Honduras Party (Partido Todos Somos Honduras, TSH)
- Honduran Patriotic Alliance (Partido Alianza Patriótica Hondureña, Alianza Patriótica)
- Anti-Corruption Party (Partido Anticorrupción, PAC)
- Savior Party of Honduras (Partido Salvador de Honduras, PSH)

=== Previous parties ===
- Honduran Revolutionary Party (Partido Revolucionario Hondureño, PRH)
- Morazanista National Liberation Party (Partido Morazanista de Liberación Nacional, PMLN)
- Party for the Transformation of Honduras (Partido para la transformación de Honduras, PTH)
- Patriotic Renewal Party (Partido Renovación Patriótica, PRP)
- Revolutionary Democratic Party of Honduras (Partido Democratico Revolucionario de Honduras, PDRH)
- Democratic Unification Party (Partido Unificación Democrática, UD)
- Revolutionary Nationalist Movement (Movimiento Nacional Revolucionario, MNR)
- Democratic Liberation Party of Honduras (Partido Liberación Democrático de Honduras, LIDERH)
- Go-Solidary Movement (Partido VA: Movimiento Solidario, VAMOS)
- Socialist Party of Honduras (Partido Socialista, PASO)
- New Route (Partido Nueva Ruta, Nueva Ruta)
- Broad Front (Partido Frente Amplio, FAPER)
- Orange Party Of Honduras (Partido Naranja de Honduras, PANAH)
- Democratic Reserve Organization of the Nation Party (Partido Organización de la Reserva Democrática de la Nacióna, ORDEN)

=== Extra-Parliamentary Parties ===
- Communist Party of Honduras (Partido Comunista de Honduras, PCH)

== See also ==
- Liberalism in Honduras

General:

- Politics of Honduras
