= National Unified Leadership of the Honduran Revolutionary Movement =

- Abbreviation: HULHRM
- Founded: 1983
- Ideology: Communism; Marxism-Leninism; Revolutionary socialism Factions: Maoism; Centroamerican unionism
- Political position: Far-left
- National affiliation: PMLN; FPRLZ; PCH; MPL; PRTC

National Unified Leadership of the Honduran Revolutionary Movement was a front of left-wing groups in Honduras. Formed in 1983, the front consisted of Revolutionary Popular Forces Lorenzo Zelaya, Communist Party of Honduras, Revolutionary Unity Movement, Morazanist Front for the Liberation of Honduras, People's Liberation Movement-Cinchoneros and the Central American Workers' Revolutionary Party.
