= Politics of Honduras =

Politics of Honduras takes place in a framework of a multi-party system presidential representative democratic republic. The President of Honduras is both head of state and head of government. Executive power is exercised by the government. Legislative power is vested in the National Congress of Honduras. The party system is dominated by the conservative National Party of Honduras, the Liberal Party of Honduras, and Liberty and Refoundation.

The Judiciary is independent of the executive and the legislature.

The 1981 Constitution of Honduras provides for a fairly strong executive in some ways, but many powers conceded to the executive elsewhere are designated duties of the unicameral National Congress. A judiciary is appointed by the National Congress.

That constitution delineates mechanisms for amending it, but it also declares eight articles immutable and unalterable and not subject to change, which include a guarantee of a republican form of government, and an explicit prohibition against presidential candidacy of anyone who has been president previously at any time or for any reason. The National Party unconstitutionally amended the latter prior to the 2017 elections, enabling the President to be re-elected for the position.

The constitution also provides for an independent organ to supervise and implement elections, the Superior Electoral Tribunal. Another organ similarly independent of the three main branches of government a Special Court for Resolution of Conflicts Between Branches of Government.

The Economist Intelligence Unit rated Honduras a "hybrid regime" in 2022.

== Structure ==
=== Executive branch ===
Main office-holders
Office	Name	Party	Since
President	Nasry Asfura	National Party of Honduras	27 January 2026

The president is both the chief of state and head of government and is elected by popular vote for a four-year term with no possibility of re-election. In the 2017 election, however, President Juan Orlando Hernández was reelected despite national protest and dispute over ballots, after The Supreme court voided a single-term limit for the country's presidency in 2015. In the 2021 election, the former first lady Xiomara Castro, leftist presidential candidate of opposition Liberty and Refoundation Party, won 53% of the votes in the presidential election to become the first female president of Honduras.

=== Legislative branch ===
The National Congress of Honduras (Congreso Nacional) has 128 members (diputados), elected for a four-year term by proportional representation; congressional seats are assigned the parties' candidates on a departmental basis in proportion to the number of votes each party receives.

=== Judicial branch ===
The judiciary includes a Supreme Court of Justice - the Supreme Court of Honduras, courts of appeal, and several courts of original jurisdiction – such as labor, tax, and criminal courts. The judges of the Supreme Court of Justice or (Corte Suprema de Justicia), are elected for seven-year terms by the National Congress.

=== Administrative divisions ===
For administrative purposes, Honduras is divided into 18 departments, with departmental and municipal officials selected for four-year terms.

=== Political parties ===
Honduras has eight political parties with representatives in the National Congress:

- National Party of Honduras (Partido Nacional de Honduras, PNH), founded 1918. Dominated Honduran politics from 1933 to 1957.
- Liberty and Refoundation (Libertad y Refundación, LIBRE), founded 2011 by a coalition of leftist organizations opposed to the 2009 coup.
- Liberal Party of Honduras (Partido Liberal de Honduras, PLH), founded 1891.
- Innovation and Unity Party (Partido Innovación Nacional y Social Demócrata, PINU-SD), moderate leftist, social democratic, founded 1970.
- Honduran Patriotic Alliance (Alianza Patriótica Hondureña) founded in 2017.
- Democratic Unification Party (Partido Unificación Democrática, UD or PUD), founded in 1992 at the end of the Cold War when formerly clandestine leftist political parties were permitted to function openly. Four merged to form the PUD.
- Christian Democratic Party of Honduras (Partido Demócrata Cristiano, DC), founded 1968.
- Anti-Corruption Party (Partido Anticorrupción, PAC), founded in 2012.

== History ==
Since about 1920 Honduras has had essentially a two-party system, with the Liberal Party and the National Party dominating electoral politics. The early 1980s were a relatively peaceful period compared to other countries in Central America buffeted by left-wing guerrillas. The Honduran government provided bases for U.S. backed counter-revolutionary armies operating in Nicaragua.

Between 1981 and 1984, several forced disappearances were carried out by the military, as proved before the Inter-American Court of Human Rights. and in the Report of the National Commissioner for the Protection of Human Rights in Honduras. In 1984, armed-forces chief General Gustavo Alvarez was deposed amid anti-US demonstrations in the capital, Tegucigalpa; this marked a decrease in counter-revolutionary activity, and the government continued to assist the United States' anti-Sandinista activities in Nicaragua in return for economic aid.

In 1986, the Liberal Party's José Azcona del Hoyo was elected president. Allegations of human rights abuses, and summary executions by police—especially of street gangs—have diminished steadily in recent years, while political violence has been a constant.

Rafael Callejas became president in 1990 and introduced neo-liberal economic reforms and austerity measures. He is credited with a major push to improve the country's transportation infrastructure. He implemented a policy of requiring cabinet member nominees to first pass appropriate examinations, unique among politicians anywhere.

In 1993, the Liberal Party's Carlos Reina was elected president, promising to reform the judicial system and limit the power of the armed forces. In April 1995 compulsory military service was abolished. The Liberal Party's Carlos Roberto Flores Facussé was elected in 1997, also promising to restructure the armed forces; in 1999 the armed forces were brought under civilian control.

In 2001, Ricardo Maduro was elected president on a platform that promised to stop rampant inflation afflicting the nation, and to put a stop to the brutal trademark violence of street gangs. At the time, the abuse of child-protection laws by gangs recruiting minors, and aggressive recruitment of members under threat of violence, lent broad popular support for Maduro's enlistment of the armed forces for a greater role in fighting crime during this time, as the police were seen as overwhelmed.

=== Gang violence ===
A major political issue in Honduras since about 1990 has been the high level of violent crime associated with the maras (Spanish for gangs, predominantly of young people), and drug trafficking organizations involved in the transport of cocaine from South America to the United States. Although gangs existed in Tegucigalpa in the 1980s, the phenomenon exploded around 1990. The range of criminal activities that street gangs carry out is broad, from kidnapping and human trafficking to drug, auto and weapons smuggling, as well as domestic extortion. A 2006 estimate by the FBI and Honduran National Security Office put the number of gang members in Honduras at 36,000.

Gang membership is partly attributable to population movement between Honduras and the United States. During the 1980s, many Hondurans fled to the US to avoid civil war and strife, and emigration continued for economic reasons after that. Other than civil war, high rates of poverty and unemployment and lack of education make at-risk youth more vulnerable to gangs. In Honduras, close to 30% of the population is aged 15–24.

Immigrant children who formed or joined urban gangs in cities such as Los Angeles began to have an impact in Honduras around 1990 because gang members completing prison sentences were deported. Deportees brought the two main gangs in Honduras, MS-13 and the 18th Street gang. In 2004, the U.S. Department of Homeland Security's Office of Immigration and Enforcement reported that Honduras received 2,345 total criminal deportations. However, it is unclear how many were gang-affiliated.

Almost a third of Hondurans feel a sense of insecurity related to crime. The report listed as causes and risk factors, "Lack of opportunities and alternatives for youth and adolescents, family breakdown, movement of Hondurans to and from the United States, and abuse of drugs and alcohol, and presence of weapons".

The report adds however, that the "overwhelming attention given to gang violence by the media and the government" is partly responsible. Gang members often compete to see which crime receives the most coverage. It has been recently contended though that the media tends to exaggerate the gang problem, thus making Hondurans believe their communities less secure than they really are, because of the extreme violence that accompanies the crimes perpetrated by these gangs. Another reason for the attention is that they most affect the lower-income population disproportionately, and almost all areas of public activities were affected.

The murder rate in 1999 was 154 murders per 100,000; around 2005 this had fallen to 49 per 100,000. (The death rate from all causes is roughly 1000 per 100,000 population.) Most of the crime in Honduras takes place in the big cities of Tegucigalpa and San Pedro Sula. A survey by Mitchell A. Seligson in 2004 found that 18% of the population thought public security and violence – delinquency, crime, violence, drug trafficking, and gangs – were the most serious problem facing the country.

Honduras has been not only a transit point for cocaine running between Colombia and the United States, a pattern broken substantially after the arrest and exile of the ex-president Mel Zelaya, but also has an internal market, creating all sorts of inner-city problems. Gangs sell crack, commit other crimes, and hire themselves out to organised drug smugglers. Those engaged in international trafficking are better resourced than the state authorities combating them. Although gang members have been arrested for selling drugs at the street level, it is still unclear how much interaction they have with the larger drug cartels and their operations within Honduras.

Some would use this argument to justify increasing US military aid to Honduras to help fight the organised drug gangs, while others claim that Honduras would be better off legalizing drugs, thus avoiding military solutions to Honduran security problems. A recent form of U.S. aid that addresses the gang problem was the creation of the Central American Regional Security Initiative (CARSI), originally seen as a part of the U.S.- Mexico Mérida Initiative. In 2010 the U.S. Congress separated funding for Central America totaling $83 million. Although some of the aid came in the form of military hardware, some components focused on strengthening the receiving country's judicial system.

President Ricardo Maduro, a former chairman of the Central Bank of Honduras, ran on an anti-crime platform after his only son was murdered on 28 April 1999. During his tenure at the Central Bank of Honduras, a banking license was given to Banco de Producción. After leaving the Central Bank he became chairman and majority stockholder of Banco de Producción, and the general manager of the Central Bank, Ana Cristina Mejia de Pereira, became general manager of Banco de la Producción.

Maduro came into power in January 2002 with a wave of measures against gangs and delinquency, the most noticeable, soldiers patrolling the streets. Many gang members were jailed for illicit association. His "Mano Duro" policy (name used to describe Central American leaders taking a hard stance against crime) led to the creation of a penal code in 2003 which made street gangs like MS-13 and M-18 illegal and established jail sentences up to 12 years for proven membership.

Violent crime dipped noticeably under Maduro. These "mano duro" policies had significant downsides as well. For example, many youth are wrongly arrested for membership but later become recruited into gangs while in jail. Also, these gang round-ups led to the overcrowding in the prison system. Regardless of the initial signs of success, gangs learned to adapt and continued to carry out their activities. Some reports say that gang leaders from El Salvador come into Honduras to help stop their decline.

Under President Zelaya's term, the government attempted to create dialog with gang members to sway them to renounce their violence and re-integrate into society. However, this program relied mainly on private groups to implement the actual re-entry programs. Zelaya also created a specialized anti-gang unit within the police force which he used to coordinate patrols with the Honduran military. Although these patrols led to the arrests of 1,200 gang members, the rate of violence in Honduras did not subside.

Their desperation resulted in a "declaration of war" against the government, and three major events over the last few years brought this tiny country to the attention of the world media: a massacre of 68 prisoners at the prison farm just outside La Ceiba on 5 March 2003, a fire in the prison at San Pedro Sula that killed 107 prisoners on 18 May 2004, and the massacre of 27 innocent men, women and children in San Pedro Sula, on 23 December 2004.

A massacre in the San Pedro Sula suburb of Chamelecón left 27 dead and 29 injured. The murderers left behind a message, claiming to come from the Cinchoneros, railing against Maduro, Lobo, Álvarez and the death penalty. The Cinchoneros are believed to be defunct, however. The attackers promised another massacre before the new year. However one suspect was detained very shortly afterwards in another part of San Pedro Sula, and further arrests were later made. Local police said that the gunmen were members of the street gang Mara Salvatrucha (MS-13), and the supposed mastermind of the attack, Ebner Anibal Rivera-Paz, was later arrested in Falfurrias, Texas.

After Maduro left office gang resurgence was felt and their presence continued, although less than before, but now using the cover of anti-government demonstrations for their activities.

== Elections ==
The PNH and PLH have ruled the country for decades. In the last years, Honduras has had five Liberal presidents: Roberto Suazo Córdova, José Azcona del Hoyo, Carlos Roberto Reina, Carlos Roberto Flores and Manuel Zelaya, and three Nationalists: Rafael Leonardo Callejas Romero, Porfirio Lobo Sosa and Ricardo Maduro. The elections have been full of controversies, including questions about whether Azcona was born in Honduras or Spain, and whether Maduro should have been able to stand given he was born in Panama.

On February 20, 2005, the PNH and the PLH held internal party elections (primaries) to decide who would represent them in the forthcoming presidential elections in November. Porfirio Pepe Lobo became the PNH candidate. Manuel Zelaya became the Liberal Party candidate. Forty-five percent of the electorate voted in the primaries: 24% for the Liberals and 21% for the National Party. According to the Country Report quoted in the U.C. San Diego Library Latin American election results, "The low participation rate in the primaries . . . is a reflection of the lack of public faith in Honduras's political institutions and leaders."

A Presidential and general election was held on November 27, 2005. Manuel Zelaya of the Liberal Party of Honduras (Partido Liberal de Honduras: PLH) won, with Porfirio Pepe Lobo of the National Party of Honduras (Partido Nacional de Honduras: PNH) coming in second. Voter turnout was 55% of the 3.9 million eligible. The PNH challenged the election results, and Lobo Sosa did not concede until December 7. Towards the end of December the government finally released the total ballot count, giving Zelaya the official victory. Zelaya was inaugurated as Honduras' new president on January 27, 2006.

== Zelaya presidency ==
On 20 December 2007, the National Congress, at the urging of the leaders of both of the dominant parties, passed a set of electoral reforms. The reforms were opposed by President Manuel Zelaya, who indicated that he would veto them, citing constitutional objections. The reforms would move the date of the presidential primaries ahead from February 2009 to November 2008, change the location of vote-counting from a central one to the individual municipalities, and radically increase public funding of political parties, from about US$3.2 million every election cycle to about US$52 million every election cycle.

=== Ouster of President Zelaya on June 28, 2009 ===
The President Manuel Zelaya's affiliation in 2008 with the Bolivarian Alliance for the Americas ALBA sparked controversy. There was further controversy when he refused to submit the government budget for Congressional approval.

In April and May 2009 Zelaya announced plans for a non-binding poll on whether to hold a referendum about whether to convene a constituent assembly that would rewrite the constitution.

The Honduran Supreme Court had upheld a lower court injunction against the 28 June poll, and on 26 June – while Zelaya ignored the injunction – it issued a secret order for his detention.

On June 28 Honduran soldiers entered the presidential palace and arrested Zelaya, preempting the poll. They put him on a military airplane which flew him to Costa Rica.

Subsequently, on June 28, the Honduran Congress, in an extraordinary session, voted to remove Zelaya from office and appoint his constitutional successor, Speaker of Congress Roberto Micheletti, in his place as interim President for a term that ended on 27 January 2010.

International reaction was universally negative with widespread condemnation of the events as a coup d'état.

== Presidency of Juan Orlando Hernandez (2014-2022) ==
After the presidential period of Porfirio "Pepe" Lobo Sosa 2010–2014, Juan Orlando Hernandez defeated Xiomara Castro, wife of ousted former president Manuel Zelaya, in the general elections in November 2013.

During the first years of his presidency the economic growth helped to improve the infrastructure of the main cities. However, unemployment and social unrest increased during his first term. He opened the possibility of changing the constitution, enraging a considerable part of the population. In 2015, the supreme court of Honduras removed a single-term limit for the country's presidency. President Juan Orlando Hernandez was re-elected in 2017, winning the election through an alleged electoral fraud that produced constant protests and violence in the streets.

In 2019, Juan Orlando Hernández's younger brother Juan Antonio “Tony” Hernández was brought to trial in New York for drug trafficking. He was convicted of all four charges against him, including drug trafficking and lying to authorities.

In September 2020, Honduran President Juan Orlando Hernandez announced that Honduras will relocate its embassy to Israel from Tel Aviv to Jerusalem. Honduras became the third country in the world after the United States and Guatemala to establish embassies to Israel in Jerusalem.

In January 2021, Honduras changed the country's constitution to make it almost impossible to legalize abortion in the future. Before that, Honduras was already one of few countries with a complete ban on abortion. The constitutional reform was supported by Honduran President Juan Orlando Hernandez's ruling National Party. Then-president, Juan Orlando Hernandez, was considered to be a divisive figure with political support within the country as well as vocal opposition from the public.

On 28 November 2021, the former first lady Xiomara Castro, leftist presidential candidate of opposition Liberty and Refoundation Party, won 53% of the votes in the presidential election to become the first female president of Honduras.

== Presidency of Xiomara Castro (2022-2026) ==
On 27 January 2022, Xiomara Castro was sworn in as Honduras' president. Her husband, Manuel Zelaya, held the same office from 2006 until 2009.

== Presidency of Nasry Asfura (2026-) ==
27 January 2026, Nasry Asfura of the National Party was sworn in as president of Honduras after winning the 2025 general election.

== Political pressure groups ==
Some of the main political pressure groups are the Committee for the Defense of Human Rights in Honduras (CODEH); Confederation of Honduran Workers (CTH); Coordinating Committee of Popular Organizations or CCOP; General Workers Confederation or CGT; Honduran Council of Private Enterprise (COHEP); National Association of Honduran Campesinos or ANACH; National Union of Campesinos or UNC; United Federation of Honduran Workers or FUTH

== Guerrilla groups ==
- The Revolutionary Popular Forces Lorenzo Zelaya was in resistance to the government, and is now defunct.
- The Cinchoneros were a leftist guerrilla group active in the 1980s, targeting foreign and corporate interests in the country, but are now defunct.

== International organization participation ==
- Central American Bank for Economic Integration (BCIE)
- Central American Common Market (CACM)
- United Nations Economic Commission for Latin America and the Caribbean (ECLAC)
- Food and Agriculture Organization (FAO)
- Group of 77 (G-77)
- Inter-American Development Bank (IADB)
- International Bank for Reconstruction and Development (IBRD)
- International Civil Aviation Organization (ICAO)
- International Criminal Court (ICC)
- International Confederation of Free Trade Unions (ICFTU)
- International Federation of Red Cross and Red Crescent Societies (ICRM)
- International Fund for Agricultural Development (IFAD)
- International Finance Corporation (IFC)
- International Labour Organization (ILO)
- International Monetary Fund (IMF)
- International Maritime Organization (IMO)
- Intelsat
- Interpol
- International Olympic Committee (IOC)
- International Organization for Migration (IOM)
- International Telecommunication Union (ITU)
- Latin American Economic System (LAES)
- Latin American Integration Association(LAIA) (observer)
- United Nations Mission for the Referendum in Western Sahara (MINURSO)
- Non-Aligned Movement (NAM)
- Organization of American States (OAS)
- Agency for the Prohibition of Nuclear Weapons in Latin America and the Caribbean (OPANAL)
- Organisation for the Prohibition of Chemical Weapons (OPCW)
- Permanent Court of Arbitration (PCA)
- United Nations
- United Nations Conference on Trade and Development (UNCTAD)
- United Nations Educational, Scientific and Cultural Organization UNESCO
- United Nations Industrial Development Organization (UNIDO)
- Universal Postal Union (UPU)
- World Federation of Trade Unions (WFTU)
- World Health Organization (WHO)
- World Intellectual Property Organization (WIPO)
- World Meteorological Organization (WMO)
- World Trade Organization (WTO)

== See also ==
- Censorship in Honduras
- Elections in Honduras
- Supreme Court of Honduras
- National congress of Honduras
- Economy of Honduras
- 2022 Honduran political crisis
