= Movimiento al Socialismo (disambiguation) =

The Movimiento al Socialismo is a socialist political party in Bolivia.

Movimiento al Socialismo may refer to:

- Movimiento al Socialismo (Argentina)
- Movimiento al Socialismo (Honduras)
- Movimiento al Socialismo (Venezuela)

== See also ==
- Movement for Socialism (disambiguation)
