= Honduran Patriotic Front =

Honduran Patriotic Front Frente Patriotico Hondureño
- Abbreviation: FPH
- Leader: Aníbal Delgado Fiallos
- Founded: September 1979
- Political position: Centre-right to far-left

The Honduran Patriotic Front (Spanish: Frente Patriotico Hondureño, abbreviated FPH) was a coalition of political groups active in Honduras in the early 1980s.

Formed as an alliance of progressive organizations, FPH gathered trade unions, political parties, student movements peasants organizations and professional associations. FPH called for safe-guarding national sovereignty and for protection of human rights. FPH was supported by the Communist Party of Honduras (PCH), the Marxist-Leninist Communist Party of Honduras (PCMLH), the Christian Democratic Party of Honduras (PDCH) and the Socialist Party of Honduras (PASO). Anibal Delgado Fiallos, a well-known leader of one of the progressive fraction of the Liberal Party, took the initiative to launch FPH in September 1979, with the intention of contesting upcoming elections, following the successes of the Nicaraguan Revolution. The founding leader of FPH was Aníbal Delgado Fiallos, an intellectual connected with the labour movement in northern Honduras. Organizations participating in FPH included Central General de Trabajadores (CGT), the Frente Nacional Campesino Hondureño and the Federación de Estudiantes Universitarios (FEUH).

FPH claimed that there was widespread fraud at the time of the April 1980 Constituent Assembly election, and called for boycott of the polls.

FPH launched a number of candidates for parliament in the 1981 general election in the departments of Yoro, Cortés, Copán and Colón. Following the election, under the government of Roberto Suazo Córdova, FPH suffered severe repression and intimidation. Candidates of FPH were kidnapped. As a result of the repression, FPH could not muster sufficient forces to contest in subsequent elections.
