= Oscar Gonzáles (writer) =

Honduran writer

- Born: Puerto Cortes, Honduras
- Occupation: writer (poet)

Oscar Gonzáles is an author and poet born in Puerto Cortes, Honduras. He has published five books in the areas of literature and the social sciences and has received literary awards from Yale University. Lauded by the Mexican poet and intellectual José Emilio Pacheco as "the rise of a fresh and unique young voice," Oscar Gonzales studied under Yale's eminent literary critics Harold Bloom, Manuel Durán, and Roberto González-Echevarría. He has a combined B.A. in Latin American studies (history, economics and literature) and B.A./M.A. in Latin American literature from Yale University, and in 1991 he became the first undergraduate to win Yale's Theron Rockwell Field Prize for his anthology of poems Donde el plomo flota (Where Lead Floats). At Yale, he was a member of Skull and Bones. He currently resides in Washington DC with his wife and three children. Durán classifies Gonzales's work with that of Nobel Prize winner Pablo Neruda "because of the amplitude of his poetry's horizons, the strength and firmness of its voice, and the 'intimist' and cosmic sensuality of his love poetry. Eroticism and panoramic vision of nature are characteristics that unite the two poets, together with an interest in the themes of liberty and the disdain of oppression, injustice, tyranny."

== Biography ==
Gonzales grew up on the north coast of Honduras in the city of Puerto Cortes, one of the largest harbors in Central America. His father was a union organizer for the transnational banana dockworkers union and was persecuted politically for his activities. Although his parents only completed basic schooling, they invested in their children's education. Gonzales attended the Saint John's Bilingual School in Puerto Cortes, a grammar school supported by Episcopalian missionaries. At age 14 he was awarded a scholarship to attend the Kent School, a New England Boarding School in Kent, Connecticut. He was accepted to attend Yale University. While attending Yale, Oscar was awarded the Theron Rockwell Field Prize for his 35-page book titled "Donde El Plomo Flota" ("Where Lead Floats"), and became the first undergraduate in Yale history to receive the award. Written in Spanish, the work satirizes social and political realities of his native Honduras and Latin America in general. The committee of judges for the Theron-Rockwell prize "was most impressed with the originality of the work and the powerful poetic voice mastered". His political writings reflect the immense sense of loss and frustration he feels about his country's present economic and political struggles. According to an interview in the Yale Daily News, "through his writing he hopes to lessen the antipathy toward Honduras and awaken a social consciousness". At Yale Gonzales studied under Yale's Harold Bloom, Manuel Durán, and Roberto González-Echevarría.

== Works ==
=== Poetry ===
In the words of Yale Professor Emeritus Manuel Duran:

The poet knows how to create an expansive poetry, that opens up to horizons that are more vast each time, without forgetting its roots in the concrete, in the immediate, in detail that is precise and revealing [...] In a more encompassing perspective and light, we can assert that our poet belongs to the family of Pablo Neruda, because of the amplitude of his poetry's horizons, the strength and firmness of its voice, and the 'intimist' and cosmic sensuality of his love poetry.

— www.oscargonzales.org

Gonzales' first book of poems, Donde el Plomo Flota, is an extended 35-page poem that intertwines personal stories of the poet's childhood and youth with the tense political situation of the 1980s in Honduras, when the Cold War was in full swing. The first section of the book discusses a world of single mothers struggling to feed children in families without father figures who are absent due to the civil war and the dire economic situation. Some of the characters are described as aunts who contemplate suicide as an escape from an oppressive system. The difficult life of the dockworkers of the banana company and their ambiguous relationship with the transnational company that simultaneously provides a living but also a dangerous workplace is treated in several poems. A section of the book discusses Honduran myths such as La Llorona, a crying female ghost who searches for her lost children, as a metaphor for the plight of single mothers without support. A scathing satirical part of the book presents the corrupt world of politicians who use tax money to buy luxury cars in a country with limited financial resources. The last section deals with the issue of the "disappeared", individuals who have been politically assassinated by the military.

His second book of poetry, Amada en el Amado Transformada, provides a wide departure from the political satire of Plomo. The poet is now deeply affected by love of his country. Influenced by Saint John of the Cross and his poem Dark Night of the Soul—to which the title alludes—the book can be interpreted as a mythical and highly symbolic retelling of the Song of Songs traditionally attributed to Salomon in the Bible. The beloved can be the motherland, the female incarnation of a spouse or poetry itself.

Central America in My Heart is Gonzales' third book and the first to be published in the United States in a bilingual edition. Lauded by the Mexican poet and intellectual José Emilio Pacheco as "the rise of a fresh and unique young voice" in poetry, the book comprises three distinct parts that vary stylistically and thematically. The first part, divided into poems named for various nations and locations, represents love poems, using location as metaphor and symbol. The second part of the book shifts to a stoic accusatory tone that reveals the poet's grief and anger as he is forced to choose a life in exile. The third part explores political themes such as justice and the issue of the disappeared in Latin America.

=== International development ===
Gonzales has also published several books in the area of international development as advocacy to promote the rights of underserved and under-represented rural populations in Latin America. The books discuss the interactions of agricultural and economic growth in lieu of poverty reduction and environmental protection programs. In Agricultural Growth, Natural Resource Sustainability and Poverty Alleviation, Gonzales argues that there are tradeoffs when programs with different objectives are implemented and solutions must incorporate a balance between competing goals. To illustrate these development strategies, three cases of land use intensification are presented: horticultural production in the Guatemalan highlands, coffee production in Honduras, the "farmer to farmer" movement in Nicaragua. These case studies are compared to two cases of land use extensification: depopulation in the north and east of El Salvador as a result of the Civil War and the abandonment of pastures in Costa Rica to illustrate the interactions between policies and de facto actions by the local populations.

Agricultural growth, natural resource sustainability, and poverty alleviation in Latin America demonstrates that hillside regions account for a large proportion of the rural poor in Latin America. These populations have been displaced from productive farmlands by intensive agricultural development. Thus, projects that simply focus on agricultural development will not necessarily lead to poverty reduction, but may sometimes increase poverty if displaced rural populations are not taken into account. A wide array of policies, technologies and institutional arrangements are presented to provide solutions to the problem of rural poverty in Latin America.

In Investigación sobre políticas para el desarrollo sostenible en las laderas mesoamericanas Gonzales writes that a large share of land in Latin America is characterized by problems of erosion, deforestation, sedimentation and loss of biodiversity. To face these problems, governments, NGOs and international agencies have traditionally recurred to the implementation of soil conservation practices, reforestation and the establishment of protected areas. Meanwhile, notable changes in land use and production practices which do not depend primarily on the implementation of any particular project have gone unnoticed, but have had a favorable and substantial impact over natural resources. If policies had concentrated on establishing the appropriate conditions to stimulate this type of spontaneous change, perhaps policies would have had more success than those which were actually implemented.

== Publications ==
=== Books ===
- Central America in My Heart. Arizona State University Bilingual Press, 2007.
- Amada en el Amado Transformada. Editorial Guaymyuras, Tegucigalpa, 1995.
- Donde el Plomo Flota, Editorial Universitaria, 1994
- Desarrollo agrícola, sostenibilidad y alivio de la pobreza en América Latina: El papel de las regiones de laderas. DSE, IFPRI, IICA, SRN. Feldafing, Germany. 343 pgs. 1995.
- Investigación sobre políticas para el desarrollo sostenible en las laderas mesoamericanas. IICA: San Jose, Costa Rica. 338 pgs. 1997.
- Agricultural growth, natural resource sustainability, and poverty alleviation in Latin America: the role of hillside regions. DSE, IFPRI, IICA, SRN. Feldafing, Germany. 227 pgs

=== Articles ===
- "Hurricane Mitch and the Livelihoods of the Rural Poor in Honduras." World Development, 2002
- "Pathways of development in hillside communities of central Honduras." IFPRI Research Report. 1998
- "Environmental and socioeconomic change in La Lima, Central Honduras, 1975–1995." IFPRI Report. 1996
- "Policies for Sustainable Development of Fragile Rainfed Lands: Research Program Overview." IFPRI Report 1996.
- "An evaluation of the PRAF Conditional Cash Transfer Program in Honduras." IFPRI Report. 2000.
- "An evaluation of the Nicaragua Red Social Conditional Cash Transfer Program." IFPRI Report. 2001.
- "An evaluation of Brazil's Bolsa Escola and Bolsa Alimentacao." IFPRI Report. 2002
