= José Antonio Cruz Oliva =

José Antonio Cruz Oliva is a Honduran sociologist. Cruz Oliva holds a doctorate in sociology from the University of the Basque Country.

Cruz Oliva was one of the leaders of the Movement for Socialism (MAS), a left-wing faction of the Christian Democratic Party of Honduras in the 1970s.

In the 2013 general election Cruz Oliva stood as a candidate for parliament for the Democratic Unification Party (UD) in Francisco Morazán. He obtained 6,218 votes.
