= Central American Integration System =

Economic and political organization

Central American Integration System Sistema de la Integración Centroamericana (Spanish) SICA
- Flag Logo
- Motto: "Dios, unión y libertad" (Spanish) "God, Union and Liberty"
- Anthem: La Granadera; The Grenadier
- States in the Central American Integration System.
- Administrative center: San Salvador, El Salvador
- Official languages: Spanish
- Type: Regional organization
- Membership: 8 states 11 regional observers 21 extraregional observers

Leaders
  - President pro tempore: Johnny Briceño
  - General Secretary: Werner Isaac Vargas Torres
- Legislature: Central American Parliament

Establishment
  - Court of Cartago: 20 December 1907
  - ODECA: 14 October 1951
  - CACM: 13 December 1960
  - SICA: 13 December 1991

Area
  - Total: 572,510 km^{2} (221,050 sq mi)

Population
  - 2009 estimate: 51,152,936
  - Density: 89.34/km^{2} (231.4/sq mi)
- GDP (PPP): 2010 estimate
  - Total: $506.258 billion
  - Per capita: $9,898.17
- GDP (nominal): 2010 estimate
  - Total: $266.213 billion
  - Per capita: $5,205.45
- Website www.sica.int (in Spanish)

The Central American Integration System (Spanish: Sistema de la Integración Centroamericana, or SICA) has been the economic and political organization of Central American states since 1 February 1993. On 13 December 1991, the ODECA countries (Spanish: Organización de Estados Centroamericanos) signed the Protocol of Tegucigalpa, extending earlier cooperation for regional peace, political freedom, democracy and economic development. SICA's General Secretariat is in El Salvador.

In 1991, SICA's institutional framework included Guatemala, El Salvador, Honduras, Nicaragua, Costa Rica and Panama. Belize joined in 1998 as a full member, while the Dominican Republic became an associated state in 2004 and a full member in 2013. Mexico, Chile and Brazil became part of the organization as regional observers, and Taiwan, Spain, Germany, Georgia and Japan became extra-regional observers. SICA has a standing invitation to participate as observers in sessions of the United Nations General Assembly, and maintains offices at UN Headquarters.

Four countries (Guatemala, El Salvador, Honduras, and Nicaragua) experiencing political, cultural and migratory integration have formed a group, the Central America Four or CA-4, which has introduced common internal borders and the same type of passport. Belize, Costa Rica, Panama and the Dominican Republic subsequently joined the CA-4 for economic integration.

== History ==
=== First Central American Court of Justice ===
Between 14 November and 20 December 1907, after a proposal by Mexico and the United States, five Central American nations (Costa Rica, El Salvador, Guatemala, Honduras and Nicaragua) took part in the Central American Peace Conference in Washington, D.C. sponsored by United States Secretary of State Elihu Root. The five nations, all former Spanish colonies, had previously tried to form a political alliance. Their first attempt was the Federal Republic of Central America, and the most recent effort was the founding of the Republic of Central America 11 years earlier.

The participants concluded the conference with an agreement creating the Central American Court of Justice (Corte de Justicia Centroamericana). The court would remain in effect for ten years from the final ratification, and communication would be through the government of Costa Rica. It was composed of five judges, one from each member state. The court heard ten cases, five of which were brought by private individuals (and declared inadmissible) and three begun by the court. The court operated until April 1918 from its headquarters in Costa Rica; despite efforts beginning in March 1917 (when Nicaragua submitted a notice of termination of the agreement), it then dissolved.

Reasons for the agreement's failure include:

- No effective system of judicial procedure
- Judges were not independent of their respective governments.
- Jurisdiction was too broad to satisfy its member states.

Exclusive Economic Zones of the member states of the Central American Integration System. Including EEZs, the total area of the CAIS is 2,351,224 km^{2}.

=== Organization of Central American States ===
At the end of World War II, interest in integrating the Central American governments began. On 14 October 1951 (33 years after the CACJ was dissolved) the governments of Costa Rica, El Salvador, Guatemala, Honduras and Nicaragua signed a treaty creating the Organization of Central American States (Organización de Estados Centroamericanos, or ODECA) to promote regional cooperation and unity. The following year (12 December 1952), ODECA's charter was amended to create a new Central American Court of Justice (Corte Centroamericana de Justicia, or CCJ) without the time limit of its previous incarnation.

The Charter of San Salvador was ratified by all Central American governments, and on 18 August 1955 their foreign ministers attended its first meeting in Antigua Guatemala. The Declaration of Antigua Guatemala authorized subordinate organizations of ODECA to facilitate economic cooperation, better sanitation and progress in the "integral union" of the Central American nations.

The Central American Common Market, the Central American Bank for Economic Integration (BCIE) and the Secretariat for Central American Economic Integration (SIECA) were established by the five Central American nations on 13 December 1960 at a conference in Managua. All nations ratified the membership treaties the following year. Costa Rica joined the CACM in 1963, but Panama had not yet joined. The organization froze during the 1969 war between Honduras and El Salvador; in 1973 ODECA was suspended, and progress toward regional integration ground to a halt.

=== Revival ===
In 1991 the integration agenda advanced with the creation of the SICA, which provided a legal framework to resolve disputes between member states. SICA was supported by the United Nations General Assembly in a resolution of 20 December 1993. SICA includes seven Central America nations and the Dominican Republic, which is part of the Caribbean. Central America has several supranational institutions, such as the Central American Parliament, the Central American Bank for Economic Integration and the Central American Common Market. The Central America trade bloc is governed by the General Treaty for Economical Integration (the Guatemala Protocol), which was signed on 29 October 1993. The CACM has removed duties on most products throughout the member countries, and has unified external tariffs and increased trade within its members. The bank has five non-regional members: Argentina, Colombia, Mexico, the Republic of China and Spain.

All SICA members are also part of the Mesoamerica Project, which includes Mexico and Colombia. Haiti admitted to join SICA in 2013 as a regional observer and the Dominican Republic became a full member on 27 June 2013.

=== Expulsions and rejections ===
Guatemala, Panama, the Dominican Republic, Costa Rica appealed SICA to expel Nicaragua from SICA membership and reject admission of Russia as a SICA extra-regional observer due to Daniel Ortega regime's support for Russia during the ongoing Russo-Ukrainian war since 2014.

== Members and observers ==
=== Member states ===
Flag	State	Capital	Largest City	Code	Accession	Population (2021)	Area	Population density	HDI (2019)
Flag of Belize	Belize	Belmopan	Belize City	BZ	1998	400,031	22,966 km^{2} (8,867 sq mi)	16/km^{2} (41/sq mi)	0.716
Flag of Costa Rica	Costa Rica	San José		CR	Founder	5,153,957	51,180 km^{2} (19,760 sq mi)	95/km^{2} (250/sq mi)	0.810
Flag of the Dominican Republic	Dominican Republic	Santo Domingo		DO	2013	11,117,873	48,671 km^{2} (18,792 sq mi)	219/km^{2} (570/sq mi)	0.756
Flag of El Salvador	El Salvador	San Salvador		SV	Founder	6,314,167	21,041 km^{2} (8,124 sq mi)	302/km^{2} (780/sq mi)	0.673
Flag of Guatemala	Guatemala	Guatemala City		GT	Founder	17,608,483	108,889 km^{2} (42,042 sq mi)	152/km^{2} (390/sq mi)	0.663
Flag of Honduras	Honduras	Tegucigalpa		HN	Founder	10,278,345	112,090 km^{2} (43,280 sq mi)	81/km^{2} (210/sq mi)	0.634
Flag of Nicaragua	Nicaragua	Managua		NI	Founder	6,850,540	130,370 km^{2} (50,340 sq mi)	47/km^{2} (120/sq mi)	0.660
Flag of Panama	Panama	Panama City		PA	Founder	4,351,267	75,420 km^{2} (29,120 sq mi)	53/km^{2} (140/sq mi)	0.815
8 total						58,096,944	570,547 km^{2} (220,289 sq mi)	102/km^{2} (260/sq mi)	0.716

=== Regional observers ===
- Argentina
- Bolivia
- Brazil
- Canada
- Chile
- Colombia
- Ecuador
- Haiti (Note: Pending observer status.)
- Mexico
- Peru
- United States
- Uruguay

=== Extra-regional observers ===
- Australia
- Egypt
- European Union
- France
- Georgia
- Germany
- Greece
- Holy See
- Italy
- Japan
- South Korea
- Morocco
- Netherlands
- New Zealand
- Order of Malta
- Qatar
- Russia
- Serbia
- Spain
- Sweden
- Taiwan
- Turkey
- United Arab Emirates
- United Kingdom

== Economic integration ==
=== Unified Central American currency ===
The Central American Bank for Economic Integration has not introduced its own common currency, and dollarization is possible. However, for formal purposes the US Dollar is sometimes referred to as "Central American Peso" pegged 1:1 to the Dollar. There are no coins or notes in this currency and it is little known outside of legal circles. Central America is increasing its regional economic development, accelerating its social, political and economic integration. The region has diversified output and price and wage flexibility; however, there is a lack of business-cycle synchronization, dissimilar levels of public-sector debt, diverging inflation rates and low levels of intra-regional trade.

== Policy integration ==
In the parliamentary body are proposals to consider regional air travel as domestic travel, to eliminate roaming fees on telephone calls and to create a regional penitentiary (affiliated with the Central American Court of Justice) to address regional trafficking and international crimes.

== Headquarters ==
SICA's administrative centre is located in San Salvador, El Salvador.

== Institutions ==
=== Central American Parliament ===
Parlacen was born as a parliamentary body emulating the Federal Republic of Central America, with Costa Rica an observer. It evolved from the Contadora Group, a project launched during the 1980s to deal with civil wars in El Salvador, Guatemala and Nicaragua. Although the Contadora Group was dissolved in 1986, the concept of Central American integration is implicitly referenced in several countries' constitutions. The Esquipulas Peace Agreement (among other acts) agreed to the creation of a Central American Parliament composed of 20–22 directly-elected deputies from each country. Costa Rica has not ratified the agreement, and is not represented in the Parlacen. Parlacen is seen by some (including former President of Honduras Ricardo Maduro) as a white elephant.

=== Central American Court of Justice ===
The CCJ's mission is to promote peace in the region and the unity of its member states. The Court has jurisdiction to hear cases:

- Between member states
- Between a member state and a non-member state accepting the court's jurisdiction
- Between states and a resident of a member state
- Concerning the integration process between SICA and member states (or persons)

The court may offer consultation to the region's supreme courts. In 2005, it ruled that Nicaraguan congressional reforms (which removed control of water, energy and telecommunications from President Enrique Bolaños) were "legally inapplicable". As of July 2005, the CCJ had made 70 resolutions since hearing its first case in 1994.

== Organizations ==
A clickable Euler diagram showing the relationships between various multinational organizations in the Americas

- Central American Bank for Economic Integration (Banco Centroamericano de Integración Económica, BCIE)
- Central American Common Market (CACM; Mercado Común Centroamericano, MCCA)
- Central American Court of Justice (CCJ)
- Central American Armed Forces Conference (Conferencia de las Fuerzas Armadas Centroamericanas, CFAC)
- Central American Parliament (Parlamento Centroamericano, PARLACEN)
  - Plenum
  - Board of Parliament
  - Secretariat
- President's Summit
  - Comité Consultivo (CC-SICA)
  - Council of Ministers of Foreign Affairs
  - Executive Committee (CE-SICA)
  - Vice President's Summit
  - Secretariat General (SG-SICA)
- Central American Educational and Cultural Cooperation (CECC)

== See also ==
- Latin American Integration Association
- Central America-4 Border Control Agreement
- Central America-4 passport
- Community of Latin American and Caribbean States
- Mercosur
- Rules of Origin
- Market access
- Free-trade area
- Tariffs

== Bibliography ==
- Hudson, Manley O. (June 1943). "Chapter 3. The Central American Court of Justice". The Permanent Court of International Justice 1920-1942 (A Treatise). New York: The Macmillan Company. pp 42–70 Sections 39-62.
- Ishmael, Odeen (July 2007). Guyana Journal (2007-07): Advancing Integration Between Caricom and Central America
- Kimitch, Rebecca (15 July 2005). Commission Studies Impeachment, Tico Times.
