= PMLN =

PMLN may refer to:

- Pakistan Muslim League (N), a Pakistani political party
- Partido Morazanista de Liberación Nacional, a Honduran political party
