= 1954 Honduras general strike =

1954 nationwide work stoppage to protest United Fruit Company policies in Honduras

The general strike of 1954 was a watershed political and economic event in the history of Honduras that ushered in widespread change.

When former United Fruit Company lawyer Juan Manuel Gálvez became president in 1954, following the contested election of 1953, he surprised everyone by adopting a pro-labor stance, introducing, among other things, an 8-hour work day, including extra pay for work on holidays. This has been widely interpreted as an attempt by Gálvez to build a larger electoral base.

In April 1954, banana workers employed by United Fruit began a wildcat strike in the northern town of Tela, primarily over pay issues. In May, dockworkers in Puerto Cortés demanded double pay for holiday work, in accordance with the law. They went out on strike when their leader was dismissed by United Fruit, and subsequently all the United Fruit workers, some 25,000, and also workers for the rival banana exporter Standard Fruit, another 15,000, also joined the strike. In addition to the fruit company workers, industrial workers at the manufacturing town of San Pedro Sula joined, making the strike a remarkable event in labor mobilization. The strike attracted attention from the role played by the still illegal but increasingly active Communist party, which is sometimes blamed for its influence, both now and at the time. U.S. Secretary of State John Foster Dulles suggested that Communists from Guatemala had infiltrated Honduras and were ultimately behind the strike.

In fact, modern scholars have presented evidence that the Communist party was as much born of the strike, out of dissident left-wing members of the Honduran Revolutionary Democratic Party as the cause of it, and that many left-leaning groups, including even the center-right Liberal party, were supportive of the strike. Local businessmen, while reluctant to support the strike publicly, did provide undercover financial backing. The United Fruit Company and the government moved to satisfy the strikers in large measure because the United States was concerned with what they thought were Communist leanings by Jacobo Árbenz in neighboring Guatemala, and as a result pressured both to resolve the strike.

The strike was resolved in July after 69 days, and as a result workers' pay increased substantially and the banana workers syndicalist labor union was recognized. The Communist party also gained stature, and the government moved to incorporate some of the demands of the workers into reform programs that continued until the 1970s.
