= Central American crisis =

Period of civil wars and revolutions in Central America, 1960s–1990s

- Part of the Cold War
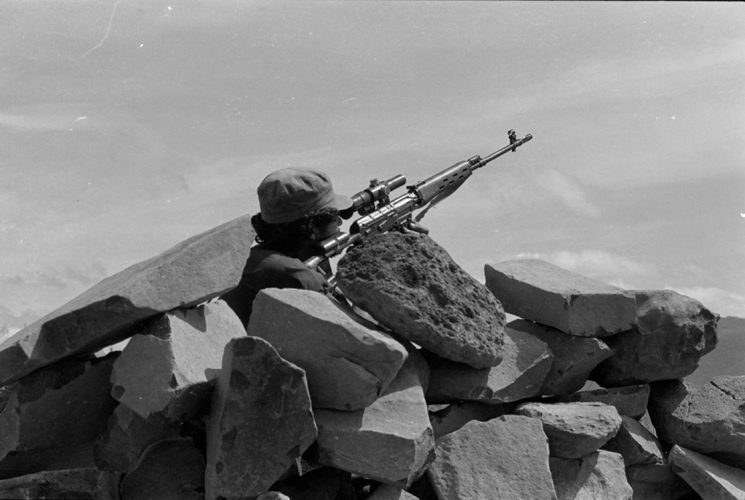
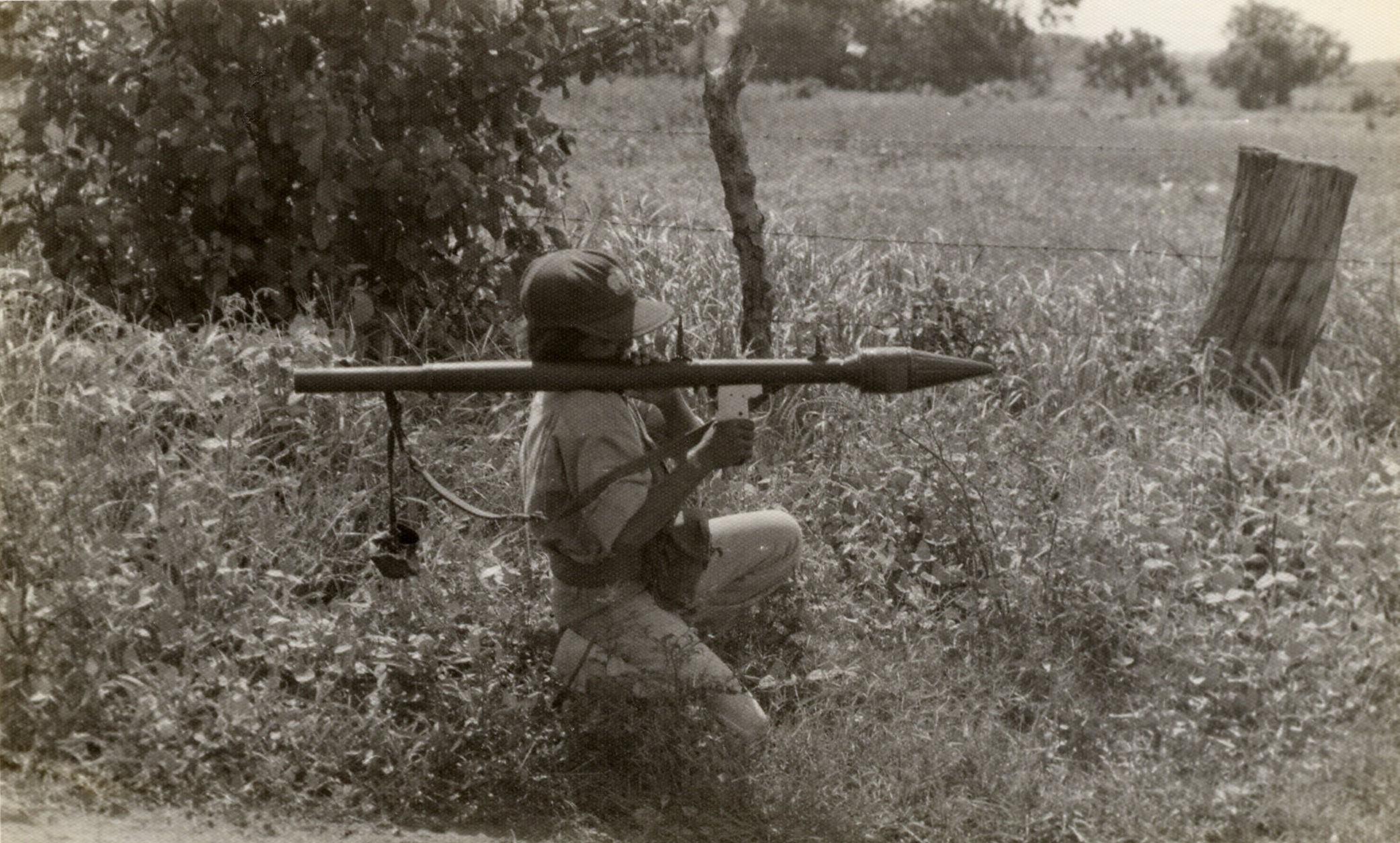
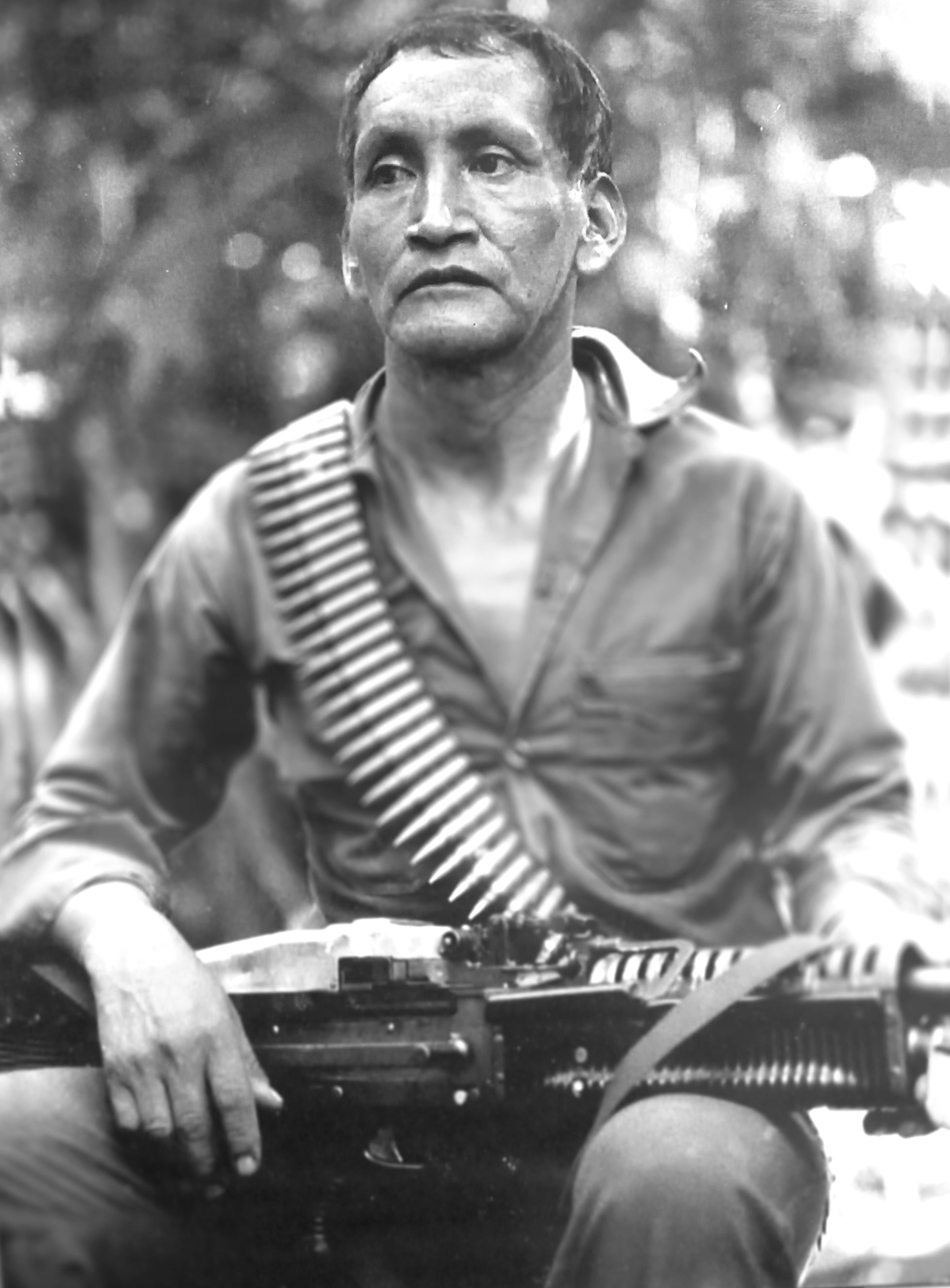
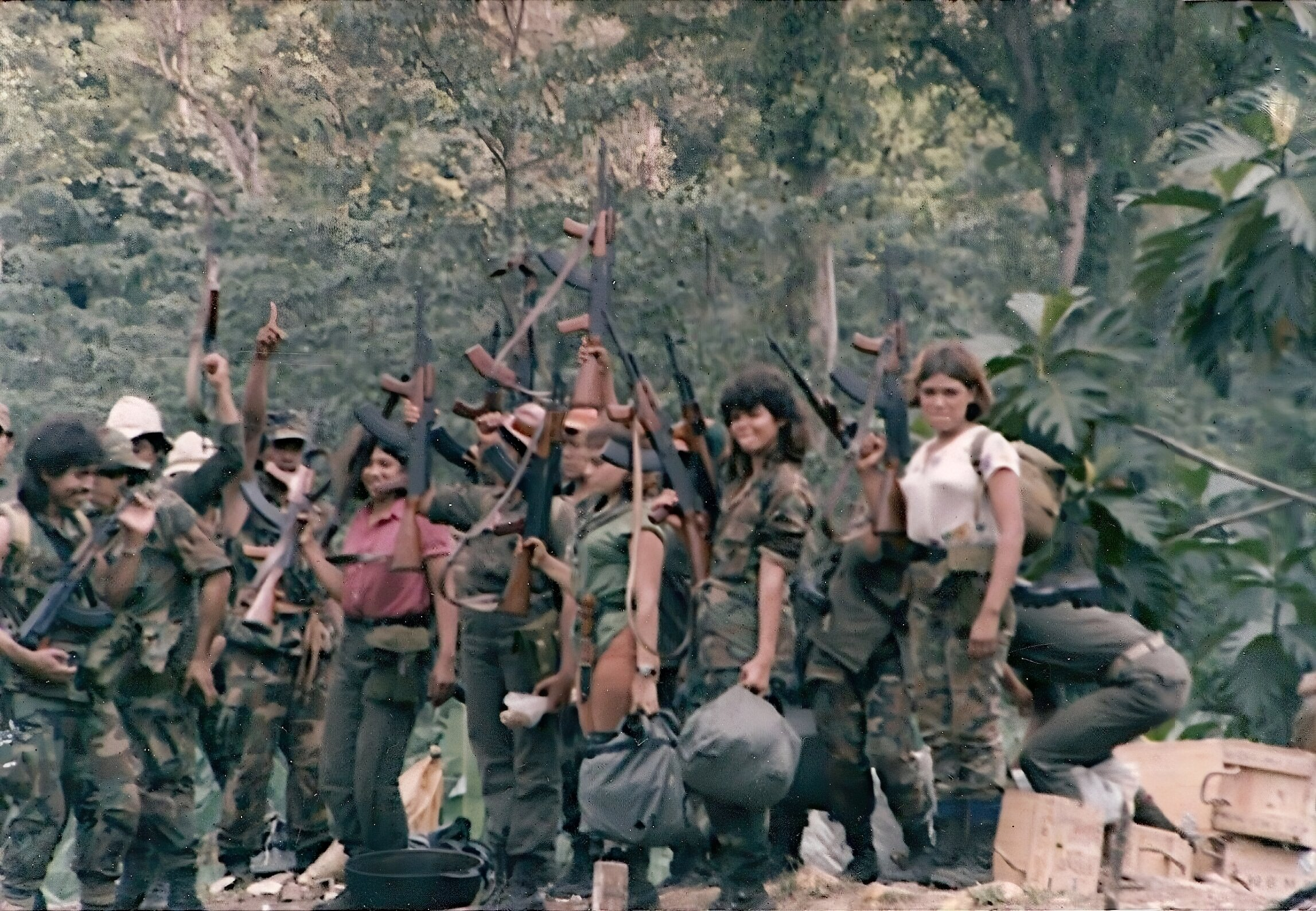
- Top: ERP combatant in El Salvador with SVD rifle; Middle: Sandinista aiming an RPG-2; Guatemalan EGP fighter with an M60; Bottom: The Nicaraguan Contras in 1987
- Date: 13 November 1960 – 29 December 1996
- Location: Central America
- Result: Esquipulas Peace Agreement; Chapultepec Peace Accords; Guatemalan Peace Process (1994–1996)

Parties
Central American state governments and right-wing paramilitaries: (Nicaragua) Somoza regime / Contras; El Salvador; Guatemala; Honduras; Support by: United States Panama	Central American guerrilla movements and left-wing governments: Sandinistas / Nicaraguan government junta; FAR/URNG; FMLN; Cinchoneros/FPRLZ; Support by: Cuba Soviet Union

The Central American crisis began in the late 1970s, when major civil wars and communist revolutions erupted in various countries in Central America, causing it to become the world's most volatile region in terms of socioeconomic change. In particular, the United States feared that victories by communist forces would cause South America to become isolated from the United States if the governments of the Central American countries were overthrown and pro-Soviet communist governments were installed in their place. During these civil wars, the United States pursued its interests by supporting right-wing governments against left-wing guerrillas.

In the aftermath of the Second World War and continuing into the 1960s and 1970s, Latin America's economic landscape drastically changed. The United Kingdom and the United States both held political and economic interests in Latin America, whose economy developed based on external dependence. Rather than solely relying on agricultural exportation, this new system promoted internal development and relied on regional common markets, banking capital, interest rates, taxes, and growing capital at the expense of labor and the peasant class. The Central American Crisis was, in part, a reaction by the most marginalized members of Latin American society to unjust land tenure, labor coercion, and unequal political representation. Landed property had taken hold of the economic and political landscape of the region, giving large corporations much influence over the region and thrusting formerly self-sufficient farmers and lower-class workers into hardship.

== Background ==
Since 1890s, the United States enjoyed a strong influence in the American continent due to the Monroe Doctrine that protects their interest in the region. In early 1960s, the aftermath of Cuban Revolution marked as a turning point for United States foreign policies. The fear of similar revolution could happen in Latin America and Soviet Union entanglement in the continent has pushed the United States into more proactive role in securing their interest in Latin America.

== Countries ==
=== Nicaragua ===
The Sandinista National Liberation Front (FSLN) overthrew the 46-year-long Somoza dictatorship in 1979. However, the United States opposed the Nicaraguan revolution due to FSLN's communist sympathies and support from Castro's Cuba and backed an anti-left wing counterrevolutionary rebellion against the Sandinista government by funding the Contras.

=== El Salvador ===
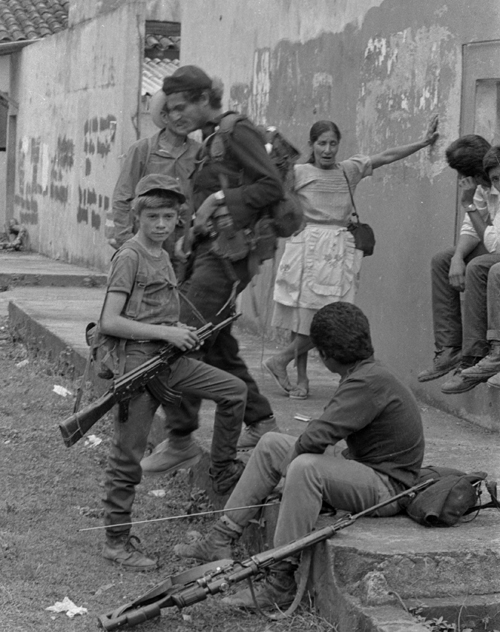
FMLN-ERP combatants in Perquín (1990); Taking a break from combat amidst a spiral of violence that caused more than 75,000 civilian victims.

Fought between the military-led government of El Salvador and the Farabundo Martí National Liberation Front (FMLN), a coalition or umbrella organization of five left-wing militias. Over the course of the 1970s, significant tensions and violence had already existed, before the civil war's full outbreak.

The United States supported the Salvadoran military government and supplied them with four billion dollars, trained their military elites, and provided them with arms over the course of a decade. Israel also actively supported the government forces and was El Salvador's largest supplier of arms from 1970 to 1976. The conflict ended in the early 1990s. Between 75,000 and 90,000 people were killed during the war.

=== Guatemala ===
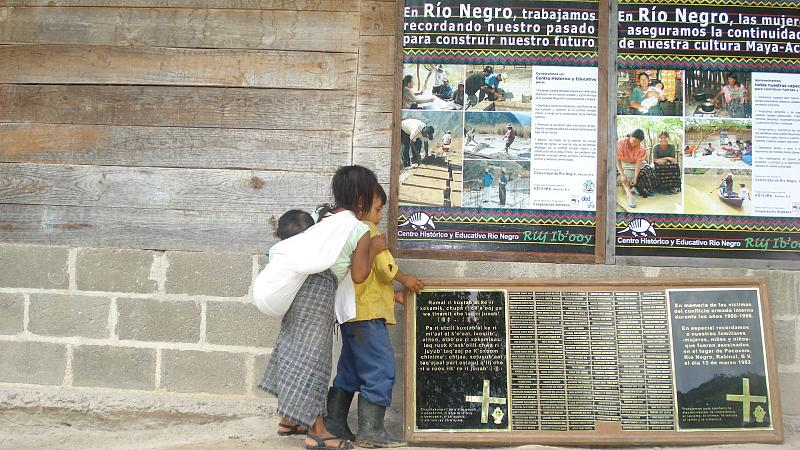
Memorial to the victims of the Río Negro massacres

Following a CIA-backed coup ousting Jacobo Árbenz in 1954, civil war ensued in Guatemala between 1962 and 1996. In Guatemala, the Rebel Armed Forces (FAR) fighting against the government were based exclusively in rural areas, and were made up of a large peasant and indigenous population. They ran a multifaceted operation and led an armed mass struggle of national character. Guatemala saw an increase in violence in the late 1970s, marked by the 1978 Panzós massacre. In 1982 the resurgent guerrilla groups united in the Guatemalan National Revolutionary Unity.

The presidency of Efraín Ríos Montt (1982–1983), during which he implemented a strategy he called "beans and bullets", is widely considered the war's turning point. The Guatemalan government and the severely weakened guerrillas signed a peace agreement in December 1996, ending the war. Over 200,000 people died over the course of the civil war, disproportionately indigenous people targeted by the Ríos Montt headed military. On 10 May 2013, Ríos Montt was convicted of genocide and sentenced to 80 years in prison.

=== Honduras ===
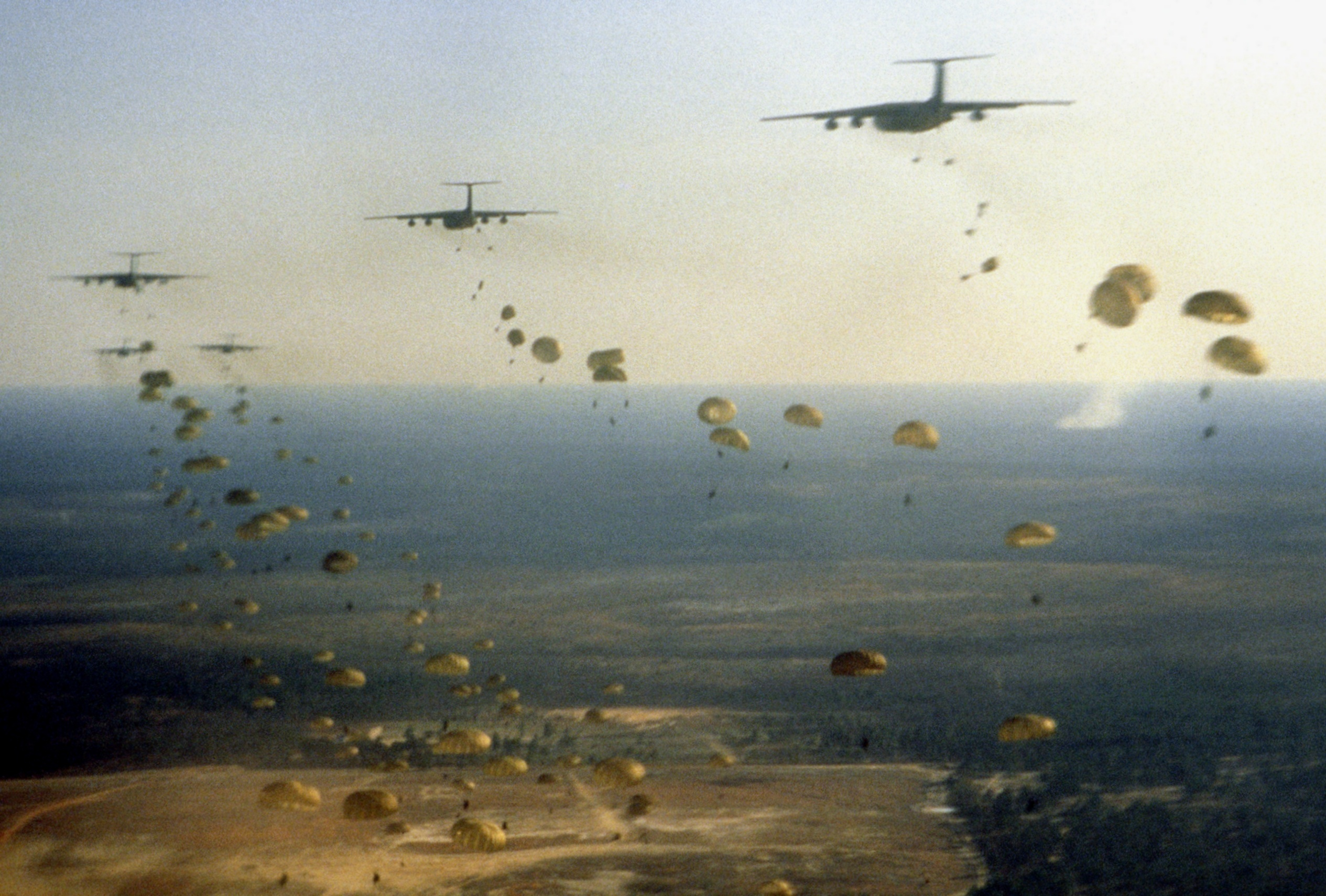
American soldiers jump off planes into Honduran territory during Operation Golden Pheasant

Going in to the Central American crisis, Honduras had suffered constant coups and military dictatorships. Consequently, by the 1980s the country slowly started a deteriorating process in terms of trade, continuing problems with the Central American common market, the decline of international financial reserves, salary decline, and increasing unemployment and underemployment. Honduras, like El Salvador, was increasingly dependent on economic assistance from the United States. As a result, several guerrilla groups emerged in the country in the late 1970s, giving rise to the so-called guerrilla insurgency of Honduras. During this period, a series of kidnappings and attacks were organized by organizations such as the People's Liberation Movement-Cinchoneros. However, these groups failed to carry out large-scale actions that would have escalated into civil war, as had occurred in neighboring countries. This was due to the military reformism of the military junta governments of the 1960s and 1970s led by Oswaldo López Arellano and Juan Alberto Melgar.

Nevertheless, fears that the civil wars wracking its neighbors might spread to the country led to the murder, torture, and disappearances of any individual identified as a dissident, spearheaded by the Honduran army's death squad Battalion 3-16, who received training and support from Central Intelligence Agency of the United States. Honduras became a key base for the Reagan administration's response to the crisis, making the Honduran territory a huge US army base to maintain military control in Central America.

US troops held large military exercises in Honduras during the 1980s, and trained thousands of Salvadorans in the country. The nation also hosted bases for the Nicaraguan Contras. In 1986, they began to see armed conflicts on the border with Nicaragua, which ended in the aerial bombardment of two Nicaraguan towns by the Honduran Air Force.

== United States response ==
- Caribbean Basin Initiative
- Central American migrant caravans
- Foreign interventions by the United States
- Latin America–United States relations
- Reagan Doctrine
- United States involvement in regime change in Latin America
- Zapatista Crisis

== Legacy ==
By the late 1980s, El Salvador, Guatemala, and Honduras all implemented reforms pushing their economies into the neoliberal model, such as privatizing state companies, liberalizing trade, weakening labor laws, and increasing consumption taxes in attempts to stabilize their economies. As of 2020, violence still reigns over Central America. A common legacy of the Central American crisis was the displacement and destruction of indigenous communities, especially in Guatemala where they were considered potential supporters of both the government and guerrilla forces.

== Peace efforts ==
Several Latin American nations formed the Contadora Group to work for a resolution to the region's wars. Later, Costa Rican President Óscar Arias succeeded in convincing the other Central American leaders to sign the Esquipulas Peace Agreement, which eventually provided the framework for ending the civil wars.

== See also ==
- CIA activities in Honduras
- CIA activities in Nicaragua
- Esquipulas Peace Agreement
- Northern Triangle of Central America
- Oliver North
- Operation Condor
- Proxy war

== Bibliography ==
- Betancur, Belisario; Figueredo Planchart, Reinaldo; Buergenthal, Thomas (1993). From Madness to Hope: The 12-Year War in El Salvador: Report of the Commission on the Truth for El Salvador. United Nations Security Council. Archived from the original on 23 February 2017.
- Blakeley, Ruth (2009). State Terrorism and Neoliberalism: The North in the South. Routledge. ISBN 978-0415686174. Archived from the original on 2015-06-14.
- DiPiazza, Francesca Davis (2008). El Salvador in Pictures. Minneapolis, Minnesota: Twenty-First Century Books. ISBN 978-0-8225-7145-2.
- "El Salvador". The World Factbook. Central Intelligence Agency. Archived from the original on 21 March 2022.
- Flemion, Philip F.; Browning, David G.; Santamaria Varela, René; Schultze-Kraft, Markus (2018). "El Salvador". Encyclopædia Britannica. Archived from the original on 29 June 2023.
- Marcus, Bruce, ed. (1985). Nicaragua: The Sandinista People's Revolution. New York: Pathfinder Press.
- Miguel Cruz, José (2015). "The Root Causes of the Central American Crisis" (PDF). Current History. 114 (769): 42–48. Archived (PDF) from the original on 4 April 2017.
- Rosenberg, Mark B. (1988). "Honduras in the Central American Conflict: Trends and Recent Developments". Lacc Occasional Papers Series. Dialogues (1980 - 1994). LACC Occasional Papers Series: Dialogues. 109. Miami: Florida International University. Archived from the original on 10 March 2018.
- "Statistics". Economic and Political Weekly. 13 (17): 740. 1978. ISSN 2349-8846. JSTOR 4366575.
- Torres-Rivas, Edelberto (1981). "Seven Keys to Understanding the Central American Crisis". Contemporary Marxism. 3 (3): 49–61. ISSN 0193-8703. JSTOR 29765685.
- Weeks, John (1986). "An Interpretation of the Central American Crisis". Latin American Research Review. 21 (3): 31–53. doi:10.1017/S0023879100016186. ISSN 1542-4278. JSTOR 2503446. S2CID 252933191.
