= Socialist Party of Honduras =

Socialist Party Partido Socialista
- Abbreviation: PASO
- Leader: Rogelio Martínez Reina
- Chairperson: Marco Virgilio Carías
- Founded: November 1978
- Dissolved: 1983
- Split from: DC
- Preceded by: MAS
- Newspaper: Bandera Socialista
- Ideology: Socialism
- Political position: Left-wing
- National affiliation: FPH

The Socialist Party of Honduras (Spanish: Partido Socialista, abbreviated PASO) was a small left-wing political party in Honduras. PASO was founded in November 1978.

Most of its founders hailed from the Movement for Socialism (MAS) tendency, expelled from the Christian Democratic Party of Honduras (PDCH). Some of its founders had been members of the Communist Party of Honduras (PCH) or the Marxist–Leninist Communist Party of Honduras (PCMLH). The formation of the new party was publicly announced in December 1978. PASO sought to establish a popular-democratic state.

Marco Virgilio Carías, professor at the Faculty of Economics at UNAH in Tegucigalpa, was the chairman of PASO. Another PASO leader was Rogelio Martínez Reina. The Propaganda Commission of PASO published the organ Bandera Socialista ('Socialist Banner').

PASO was active within the Honduran Patriotic Front (FPH). The party tried to get itself registered with the National Electoral Tribunal in 1980. In April 1980, some of its leaders were arrested, accused of involvement in the kidnapping of a Texaco official (the action had been claimed by the PRTC). At a press conference on April 24, 1980, Carías denied any involvement in the kidnapping. Along with the FPH, PASO called for a boycott of the 1980 elections.

Carías sought to run as a candidate for parliament in the 1981 general election. However, he was unable to register himself as candidate as he was kidnapped in September 1981. Moreover, the other FPH organizations didn't back up his candidacy and he was thus unable to gather the necessary signatures to formalize his candidature.

The party dissolved itself in 1983.
