= Honduran Revolutionary Party =

Honduran Revolutionary Party Partido Revolucionario Hondureño
- Abbreviation: PRH
- Founded: 1961
- Dissolved: 1993
- Split from: PCH
- Merged into: UD
- Ideology: Communism; Marxism
- Political position: Far-left

Honduran Revolutionary Party (Partido Revolucionario Hondureño) was a small clandestine leftist party in Honduras, which was formed in 1961 by former members of the Communist Party of Honduras who sought a more "scientifically Marxist" platform. PRH was active in the peasants' movement. In 1993, the PRH merged with three other groups to form the Democratic Unification Party.
