= Andrés Pavón =

- Born: 21 July 1962 (age 63); Colón, Honduras
- Occupation: Politician
- Political party: UD/FAPER
- Spouse: Ritzy Alméndarez
- Children: 3

Andrés Pavón Murillo (born 21 July 1962) is a Honduran politician and Human Rights activist. He ran unsuccessfully as a presidential candidate for the 2013 general election representing the UD/FAPER alliance. and former President of the Committee for the Defense of Human Rights in Honduras.
