= Matías Funes =

Honduran politician

Matías Funes Valladares (24 March 1952 – 10 February 2015) was a Honduran academic, writer and politician. He taught philosophy at the Universidad Nacional Autónoma de Honduras for 34 years. He was a founder of the Democratic Unification Party for which he was member of the National Congress of Honduras between 1998 and 2002. He was also presidential candidate for the party in the 1997 and 2001 elections.

== Early life ==
Funes was born on 24 March 1952 in the Honduran capital Tegucigalpa, his father, was a writer also named Matías Funes. Funes studied Social and Judicial Sciences and later obtained a Master in Economy and Development Planning. He later studied Central American integration. During his time in university he was member of the university council. When he was 21, he led the newspaper Vanguardia Revolucionaria.

== Political career ==
He was a founder and member of the Democratic Unification Party and served for that party in the National Congress of Honduras between 1998 and 2002. He was candidate for the presidency of Honduras in the 1997 elections and 2001 elections. He had also served as member of the Central American Parliament. He retired from active political work for the party due to internal party issues.

== Academic career ==
Funes worked for 34 years at the Universidad Nacional Autónoma de Honduras, starting in 1978. He was a professor of philosophy until 2012, when he retired. He was considered to be an expert on Honduran history, specializing in the life of José Cecilio del Valle.

Funes was a writer, analyst and columnist. Writing books amongst others on the history of the military in Honduras.

Funes was also member of the National Electoral Tribunal, which would later become the Supreme Electoral Tribunal.

In the final years before his death, between 2012 and 2014, Funes was member of the Commission for Reform of Public Security. He died on 10 February 2015 in Tegucigalpa, aged 62, from liver cancer which he had been diagnosed with on 22 December 2014.
