= Elections to the Central American Parliament =

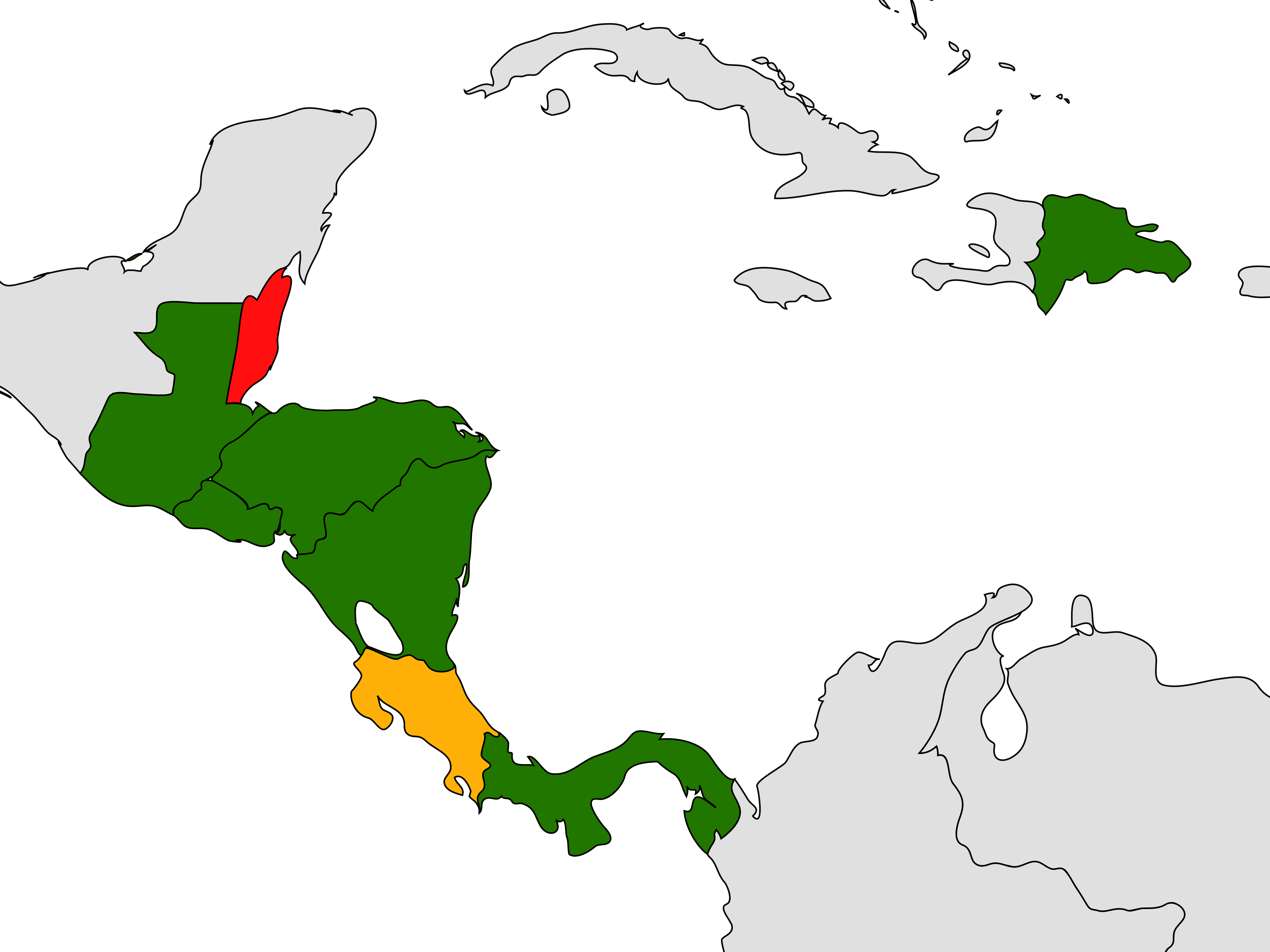
Central American Countries by Status in Central American Parliament Member Non-ratifying signatory Non-member

The Central American Parliament (PARLACEN) was established by its Constitutive Treaty in October 1987. The primary objective of the institution was regional integration for the sake of mutual betterment. According to the Esquipulas Declaration of 1986, which began the process that ultimately led to the creation of the Parliament, there existed a "need to undertake efforts aimed at understanding and co-operation and to back them up with institutional machinery for strengthening dialogue, joint development, democracy and pluralism [...]." The Declaration determined that PARLACEN representatives should be selected in free, inclusive, and direct elections.

After Costa Rica failed to ratify the Constitutive Treaty, the other initial signatories approved the Protocol to the Treaty on the Establishment of the Central American Parliament and Other Political Organs, which amended the Constitutive Treaty to allow the PARLACEN to be created without ratification by Costa Rica.

The meaning of the term 'direct' in the context of elections to the PARLACEN differs in application among the member states. In El Salvador, Guatemala, and Nicaragua, voters normally select individual parties or candidates specifically for the PARLACEN in a vote that is separate from other contests. In the Dominican Republic, Honduras, and Panama, the votes won by parties or candidates in the national presidential or parliamentary elections are normally applied proportionally among the parties with regard to their respective slates of nominated PARLACEN candidates. While these are considered to be direct elections as the representatives are chosen by ballot, voters in these countries do not select candidates or parties separately for the PARLACEN.

Political party primary and run-off elections are not typically held for PARLACEN contests.

== Electoral framework ==
Pursuant to Chapter 1 Article 2 Clause a of the Constitutive Treaty, the elected members of the PARLACEN are denoted as follows:

"Twenty members of parliament for each Member State. Each member shall be elected with their respective alternate, who shall replace them in case of emergency. They shall be elected for a term of five years by direct and secret universal suffrage, and may be re-elected."

Basic electoral principles are described in Article 6:

"Each Member State shall elect its regular and alternate deputies to Parliament, in accordance with the applicable provisions of national legislation that regulates the election of deputies or representatives to their Congresses or Legislative Assemblies, with unavoidable observance of broad political and ideological representation, in a pluralistic democratic system that guarantees free and participatory elections, under conditions of equality for the respective political parties, all in accordance with point 4, "Free Elections", of the "Procedure to establish firm and lasting peace in Central America".

The elections must be held at least three months before the expiry of the period referred to in Article 2 of this Instrument."

The Treaty stipulated the original procedures for the first election in Chapter 7 Article 32:

"The process of electing the first deputies to the Central American Parliament must be carried out in the five member countries, within a simultaneous compliance period of 6 months from the date of entry into force of this Treaty, in accordance with the electoral laws of each member State.

In those States where it is necessary to reform the national legislation for the holding of elections of deputies to the Central American Parliament, the Executive Branch will request them as soon as possible from the corresponding Legislative Branch."

The Protocol amended Article 32 as follows:

"The first elections of deputies to the Central American Parliament shall take place concurrently in the member States during the 17 months following the date on which this Treaty enters into force and shall be conducted in accordance with their respective electoral laws.

In the States in which the national legislation has to be amended for the purpose of electing deputies to the Central American Parliament, the executive branch shall, at the earliest possible date, request the legislative branch to make such amendments.

A signatory State which deposits its instrument of ratification after the entry into force of the Treaty shall hold its election during the following 12 months."

== Parliamentary terms ==
Term	Period
1st	October 1991 — October 1996
2nd	October 1996 — October 2001
3rd	October 2001 — October 2006
4th	October 2006 — October 2011
5th	October 2011 — October 2016
6th	October 2016 — October 2021
7th	October 2021 — October 2026
8th	October 2026 — October 2031

Source: parlacen.int/historia

== Electoral system by member state and election ==
=== Dominican Republic ===
Parliament	Selection Method	Election Date	Notes
5th	Linked single-vote election	16 May 2010	Determined by congressional election
6th	Linked single-vote election	15 May 2016	Determined by congressional election
7th	Linked single-vote election	5 July 2020	Determined by senatorial election; Originally scheduled for 17 May 2020
8th	Linked single-vote election	19 May 2024	Determined by senatorial election

=== El Salvador ===
Parliament	Selection Method	Election Date	Notes
1st	Separate election	10 March 1991	-
2nd	Separate election	20 March 1994	-
3rd	Separate election	12 March 2000	-
4th	Separate election	12 March 2006	-
5th	Separate election	18 January 2009	-
6th	Separate election	27 March 2015	-
7th	Separate election	28 February 2021	-
8th	Separate election	3 March 2024	-

=== Guatemala ===
Parliament	Selection Method	Election Date	Notes
1st	Linked single-vote election	11 November 1990	Determined by presidential election
2nd	Separate election	12 November 1995	-
3rd	Separate election	7 November 1999	-
4th	Separate election	9 November 2003	Elections on this date were annulled and re-administered in several municipalities due to procedural irregularities
4th	Separate election	28 December 2003	Re-administered elections
5th	Election Cancelled	Election Cancelled	Elections scheduled for 9 September; 2007 were cancelled
5th	Separate election	11 September 2011	-
6th	Separate election	6 September 2015	-
7th	Separate election	16 June 2019	-
8th	Separate election	25 June 2023	-

=== Honduras ===
Parliament	Selection Method	Election Date	Notes
1st	Linked single-vote election	26 November 1989	Determined by presidential election
2nd	Linked single-vote election	18 November 1993	Determined by presidential election
3rd	Linked single-vote election	30 November 1997	Determined by presidential election
4th	Linked single-vote election	25 November 2001	Determined by presidential election
4th	Prior election	No Election Scheduled	Incumbent terms extended to 2011
5th	Linked single-vote election	29 November 2009	Determined by presidential election
6th	Linked single-vote election	24 November 2013	Determined by presidential election
7th	Linked single-vote election	26 November 2017	Determined by presidential election
8th	Linked single-vote election	28 November 2021	Determined by presidential election
9th	To Be Determined	30 November 2025	Upcoming

=== Nicaragua ===
Parliament	Selection Method	Election Date	Notes
2nd	Separate election	20 October 1996	-
3rd	Separate election	4 November 2001	-
4th	Separate election	5 November 2006	-
5th	Separate election	6 November 2011	-
6th	Separate election	6 November 2016	-
7th	Separate election	7 November 2021	-

=== Panama ===
Parliament	Selection Method	Election Date	Notes
2nd	Linked single-vote election	2 May 1999	Determined by presidential election
3rd	Linked single-vote election	2 May 2004	Determined by presidential election
4th	Linked single-vote election	3 May 2009	Determined by presidential election
5th	Linked single-vote election	4 May 2014	Determined by presidential election
6th	Linked single-vote election	5 May 2019	Determined by presidential election
7th	Linked single-vote election	5 May 2024	Determined by presidential election

== See also ==
- Central American Parliament
