= Movement for Socialism (disambiguation) =

The Movimiento al Socialismo is a Bolivian political party.

Movement for Socialism and Movimiento al Socialismo may also refer to:

- Movimiento al Socialismo (Argentina)
- Movement for Socialism (Britain)
- Movimiento al Socialismo (Honduras)
- Movement for Socialism (Switzerland)
- Movimiento al Socialismo (Venezuela)

== See also ==
- Movement for a Socialist Future
