= Aníbal Delgado Fiallos =

José Aníbal Delgado Fiallos (September 18, 1936 – December 28, 2013) was a Honduran scholar, political analyst and politician.

== Student movement ==
Born in Siguatepeque in 1936, Delgado Fiallos spent his youth as an activist in the student movement, fighting to achieve university autonomy. He was one of the founders of the University Reform Front (FRU) in the 1950s. He was also an activist of the Liberal Party of Honduras. During the coup d'état that overthrew Ramón Villeda Morales, Delgado Fiallos was detained. Delgado Fiallos obtained a bachelor's degree in economics from the National Autonomous University of Honduras (UNAH) and a master's degree in Political and Social Sciences from the Faculty of Philosophy and Letters of the University of Havana.

== Patriotic Front ==
Delgado Fiallos founded and led the Honduran Patriotic Front, a coalition of progressive organizations active in the early 1980s.

== INA director and presidential candidate ==
He took part in the presidential primaries of the Liberal Party ahead of the 1997 general election. He served as director of the National Agrarian Institute (INA) between 1998 and 2002.

== 2009 coup ==
Delgado Fiallos opposed the 'cuarta urna' proposed by President Manuel Zelaya Rosales, but also opposed the coup d'état that removed Zelaya from power. He took part in the street protests in San Pedro Sula against the coup, identified himself as part of the Resistance but did not join the Libre party launched by Zelaya.

== Academic career ==
He served as Dean of the Faculty of Economic Sciences in San Pedro Sula and coordinator of the sociology courses at Centro Universitario Regional del Norte. He retired from his academic posts in 2010.

== Later years ==
In his later years, Delgado Fiallos distanced himself from the Liberal Party. Delgado Fiallos died in his residence in San Pedro Sula on December 28, 2013, at the age of 77.

== Bibliography ==
Delgado Fiallos authored several books, such as Honduras Elecciones 85, Lecturas de Política, Rosa el Político and Rojo y Blanco.

== Awards ==
Delgado Fiallos was awarded the title of Professor Emeritus of the National Autonomous University of Honduras (UNAH). He was also rewarded the medal of the World Peace Council, the gold medal "José Cecilio del Valle a la Excelencia Académica", and the Rafael Heliodoro Valle award (given by the Secretariat for Culture, Arts and Sports).
