= People's Liberation Movement-Cinchoneros =

Hondurean guerrilla organization

- Movimiento Popular de Liberación-Cinchoneros
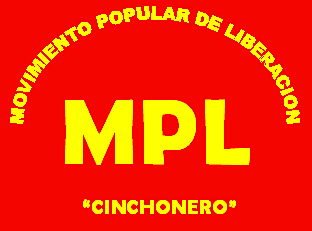
- Founder: Fidel Martínez Rodríguez
- Founded: September 1979
- Dates active: 1980s
- Split from: PCH
- Ideology: Communism; Revolutionary socialism
- Political position: Far-left

The People's Liberation Movement (Spanish: Movimiento Popular de Liberación) also known as the Cinchoneros, was a paramilitary socialist organization active in the 1980s in Honduras. The MPL was one of the primary militant organizations in Honduras at the time, along with the Lorenzo Zelaya Popular Revolutionary Forces.

== History ==
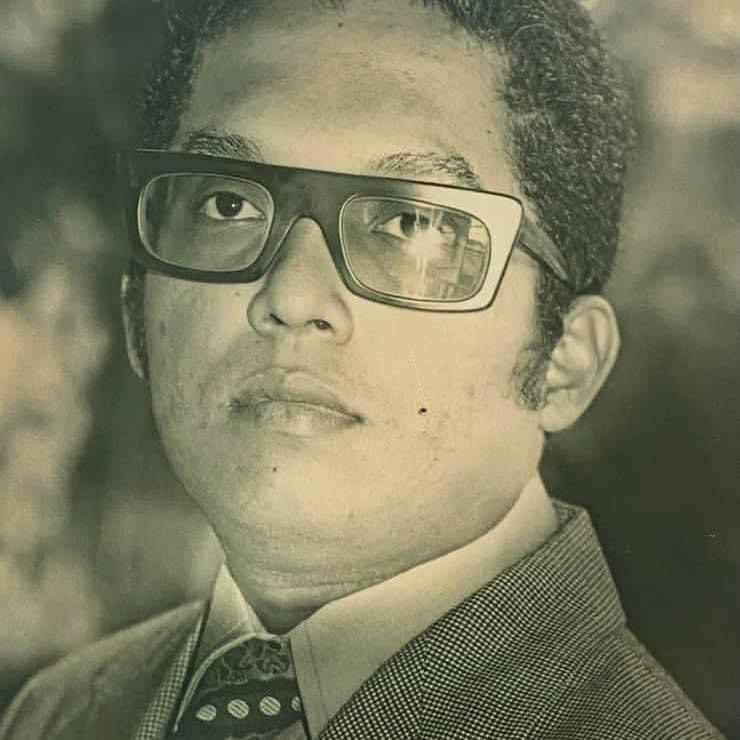
Fidel Martínez Rodríguez, founder of the MPL

The group was born in september of 1979 Inspired by the Sandinista victory in Nicaragua by former members of the Communist Party of Honduras (PCH) which was going through a division between those who were more oriented to support the Soviet Union and those towards the People's Republic of China. The group took its name from 19th century Honduran peasant leader Serapio Romero (nicknamed Cinchonero), who was executed by decapitation in 1868 for leading a rebellion. The MPL was believed to be linked to other leftist movements in El Salvador, Cuba, and Nicaragua. Although the group acted against multinational corporations in Honduras and in favor of less favored groups in the country, it also became involved in the hijacking of airplanes, kidnappings and hostage-taking.

=== Activities ===
The group was suspected of assassinating General Gustavo Álvarez Martínez leader of the death squad battalion 3-16 in 1989. Despite the efforts of the organization to create a popular uprising in Honduras together with other groups of a revolutionary nature such as the Lorenzo Zelaya Popular Revolutionary Forces, a revolution was never created as it happened in neighboring countries due to the military reformism of the administration of the military meetings of the 60s and 70s. After the collapse of the Soviet Union the group began to lose strength to the extent that it began to resolve itself.

== See also ==
- Cold War
- Operation Condor

== Sources ==
- Terrorist Group Profiles. DIANE Publishing, 1989 ISBN 1-56806-864-6 ISBN 978-1-56806-864-0
