= International Support and Verification Commission =

CIAV Headquarters, Estelí, Nicaragua

The International Support and Verification Commission (Comisión Internacional de Apoyo y Verificación, CIAV) was created as a joint approach to repatriating the Contras by the secretaries-general of the United Nations and the Organization of American States on August 25, 1989 in support of the Esquipulas II Peace Plan. Its mandate was to assist in the voluntary demobilization, repatriation or resettlement of the Nicaraguan Resistance (the Contras) in Nicaragua and third countries as well as assistance in the voluntary demobilization of all persons involved in armed actions in all countries of the region. In practice the UN involvement in CIAV was relatively short (from late 1989 through mid-1990), while the OAS participated in CIAV from the beginning and was deeply involved until 1993. In part this situation was due to the UN's emphasis on ONUCA (Observadores de las Naciones Unidas en Centro América - UN Observer Group in Central America), but it also reflected a geographic division of labor: the UN was assigned repatriation responsibilities in Honduras (where it was active only in late 1989 and early 1990), Costa Rica (where there were few Contras) and El Salvador (where there were practically none, and where the FMLN was having no part in any "voluntary repatriation"). CIAV-OAS, on the other hand, was assigned geographic responsibilities for Nicaragua, which meant that they were responsible for every Contra and Contra family member who crossed the border into Nicaragua, and continued to be responsible for the support of most of them through 1993.

CIAV Contra resettlement camp, Yalí, Nicaragua

== CIAV and ONUCA after the Contra demobilization ==
With the demobilization of the Contras completed in early July 1990, both ONUCA and CIAV substantially changed their roles, budgets, and significance. The Venezuelan Battalion went home and the ONUCA mandate reverted to the original rather limited one of watching for violations of the Esquipulas prohibition on cross-border support of irregular forces. CIAV, on the other hand, now assumed full responsibility for supporting the former Contras in Nicaragua, as well as those (mainly dependents and the sick and wounded) who still remained in Honduras. Under the geographic division of responsibility, the Honduras operation of CIAV belonged to the UN side, while that in Nicaragua was under the OAS. CIAV-UN in practice was handled by an existing UN organization, the UN High Commissioner for Refugees (UNHCR), and concentrated on repatriating the Nicaraguans out of Honduras, much to the relief of the Hondurans themselves. Because CIAV's basic mandate was to help former Contras and their families, practically anything they did inevitably got them involved in post-election Nicaraguan politics. CIAV-OAS soon found itself in a politically very difficult situation: if they did their job poorly and failed to support the former Contras they would be criticized by the Contras, by their OAS superiors in Washington, and by the U.S. Government, which was financing the whole Contra support operation. On the other hand, if they did their job well and effectively helped the Contras they would be criticized by the Sandinistas for going too far in keeping the Contras together, and possibly for even stimulating them to take up their arms again. While ONUCA's profile was being lowered and its personnel focused on the border areas, ONUCA could bask in the general goodwill stemming from the demobilization process which was completed in mid-1990. But at the same time, fairly or unfairly, CIAV-OAS was blamed for contributing to the unrest that characterized Nicaraguan politics from that point onward.

The relations between CIAV-OAS and OAS Headquarters in Washington (especially the office of Secretary General Baena Soares) were sometimes strained. The key people in CIAV were not traditional diplomats or international organization staffers, and they often acted in ways that were unorthodox and even audacious. Since their funding was assured by the US government, they felt some independence from normal OAS constraints. This permitted them considerable latitude, even though at times they felt that OAS Headquarters was giving them the cold shoulder.

The CIAV observers were an unusual bunch, mainly academics, professionals and government functionaries with few ties to the OAS itself. They were originally recruited for short-term contracts as brief as two or three months, but many of them remained in Nicaragua for periods of up to three years. Under the leadership of Santiago Murray, they did not hesitate to get aggressively involved in potentially risky situations involving confrontations between former Contras, former (and/or current) Sandinista security personnel, and government representatives. Their improvisation, enthusiasm and esprit de corps—unusual in an international verification mission—gave their actions a distinctive tone. In the countryside they frequently found themselves mediating a wide range of situations involving land ownership, human rights violations, and assorted violent or disruptive actions by an impressive array of players.
