= Democratic Unification Party =

Democratic Unification Party Partido Unificación Democrática
- President: Alfonso Díaz Narváez
- Founded: 29 September 1992
- Dissolved: 18 March 2025
- Merger of: PMLN, PRH, PRP and PTH
- Headquarters: Tegucigalpa
- Youth wing: Juventud del Partido Unificación Democrática
- Ideology: Democratic socialism Liberal socialism Social democracy Before 2014: Socialism
- Political position: Centre-left; Before 2014: Left-wing
- Regional affiliation: Parliamentary Left
- Continental affiliation: Foro de São Paulo
- Colors: Yellow
- National Congress: 0 / 128

The Democratic Unification Party (Spanish: Partido Unificación Democrática; PUD) was a centre-left political party in Honduras. PUD was founded on 29 September 1992 by the merger of four leftist clandestine or semiclandestine political parties, in the context of the changed political situation in Central America at that period, following the end of the Cold War. The PUD was legally recognised in 1993/4 and has contested various elections since 1997, gaining around 1-3% of the vote.

== History ==
PUD was founded on 29 September 1992, by the merger of four leftist clandestine or semiclandestine political parties, namely Partido para la transformación de Honduras (PTH), Partido Revolucionario Hondureño (PRH), Partido Morazanísta de Liberación Nacional (PMLN) and Partido Renovación Patriótica (PRP). The background of the formation of PUD was the changed political situation in Central America at that period, following the end of the Cold War. Matías Funes was one of the founders of the party.

In Decree No. 189-93 of the National Congress (the Honduran parliament) of 1 October 1993, the state of Honduras legally recognised the PUD. That act was a follow-up of the Esquipulas Accords, by which the Central American governments agreed to give the revolutionary groups in the region possibilities to organize legally and participate in the political process.

Decree No. 92-94 of the National Election Tribunal of 28 January 1994, gave the PUD recognition as the fifth legally recognized political party in Honduras.

The PUD was supportive of President Manuel Zelaya in the 2009 Honduran constitutional crisis and the People's Weekly World reported that he was likely to back the PUD's presidential candidate, César Ham, in the November 2009 election. There were speculations about an alliance with the newly formed Broad Front and Zelaya's Liberty and Refoundation (Libre). In the end, the party formed an alliance with the former and nominated Andrés Pavón as their presidential candidate.

Since the rise of Libre, the party was in decline. Since 2014, the party was accused of being a "hinge party" (forming alliances with parties which have opposing views) and as "always being an ally of the National Party". In 2025, the party lost its registration since they lost all of their seats in parliament and mayors by that point.

== Overview ==
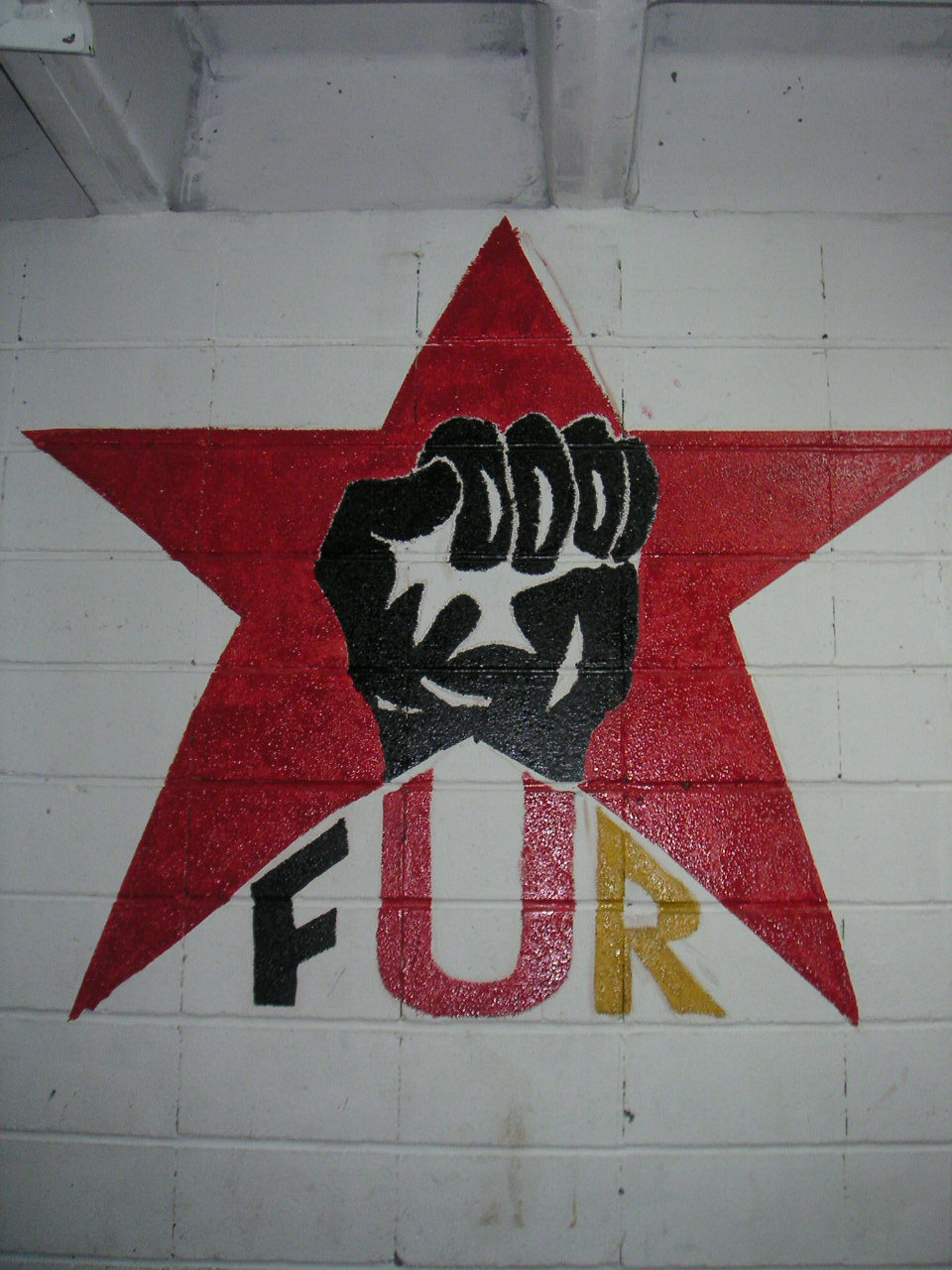
FUR symbol

The colours of PUD are red and yellow. Red symbolizes the blood of the martyrs of the struggle and yellow symbolizes the new dawn of Honduras. The banner of PUD is yellow with the letter "UD" in red. The slogan of PUD is UD marca la differencia ("UD [can be interpreted as usted, you] makes a difference").

PUD defines itself as a patriotic, democratic, popular and revolutionary party. The five pillars of PUD are Ethics, Democracy, Criticism, Proposal and Struggle.

The maximum authority of PUD is the National Assembly, which elects the Junta Directiva Nacional. In the departments of the country Department Assemblies are held, which each elects a Junta Directiva Departamental, and likewise on municipal level Municipal Assemblies are held which each elects a Junta Directa Municipal. Under the JDMs are the base units of the party, Colectivos de Base.

Within PUD there are two currents recognized by the National Election Tribunal, Pueblo Unido and Convergencia Popular.

The youth of PUD is called Juventud del Partido Unificación Democrática (JUD). JUD consists of three components, Fuerza Universitaria Revolucionaria (FUR), Federación Nacional de Estudiantes de Secundaria de Honduras (FENAESH) and a movement of Barrio youths.

== Electoral record ==
In the 1997, elections the PUD's presidential candidate was Matías Funes; he polled 23,977 votes (1.21%) in the election. The party received 41,113 votes (2.16%) in the parliamentary elections, and 34,785 votes (1.77%) in the municipal elections. In total, one congressional deputy, one member of PARLACEN (the Central American parliament), one mayor and 21 municipal councillors were elected on behalf of UD.

In the 2001 elections, PUD again put forward Funes for president; he received 24,075 votes (1.11%). In the congressional election, the PUD received 92,818 votes (4.46%), and in the municipal elections, 48,951 votes (2.26%). In total, five congressional deputies, one member of PARLACEN and 26 municipal councillors were elected on behalf of UD.

In the 27 November 2005 elections, PUD candidate Juan Ángel Almendares Bonilla won 27,731 votes (1.5%) in the presidential elections. The party received an unknown number of votes in the parliamentary elections and an unknown number of votes in the municipal elections. In total five congressional deputies, an unknown number of members of PARLACEN, one mayor and an unknown number of municipal councillors were elected on behalf of UD.

In the 2009 elections, PUD candidate César Ham won 36,420 votes (1.7%) in the presidential elections and won 4 seats. In 2013, the party collapsed despite their alliance with FAPER. Their joint candidate Andrés Pavón only won 3,118 votes (0.1%) and UD only won a single seat.
