= Revolutionary Democratic Party of Honduras =

The Revolutionary Democratic Party of Honduras (Spanish: Partido Democratico Revolucionario de Honduras) was a political party in Honduras. It was formed by members of the short lived Partido Democratico Revolucionario (formed in 1946) and non-Marxist but left leaning members of the Honduran Liberal Party in San Pedro Sula in 1948. It was one of the prime supporters of the General Strike in 1954, and during the strike its more leftist members formed the Communist Party of Honduras.
