= Revolutionary Popular Forces Lorenzo Zelaya =

Revolutionary Popular Forces Lorenzo Zelaya Fuerzas Populares Revolucionarias Lorenzo Zelaya
- Founded: 1980
- Split from: PCMLH
- Merged into: PRP
- Ideology: Communism; Revolutionary socialism
- Political position: Far-left

Revolutionary Popular Forces Lorenzo Zelaya (Spanish: Fuerzas Populares Revolucionarias Lorenzo Zelaya), was a clandestine politico-military movement in Honduras. FPRLZ was formed in 1980 by dissidents of PCMLH. FPRLZ was inspired by the Nicaraguan Revolution of 1979, and unlike the traditional communist parties (the PCH and PCMLH), FPRLZ advocated guerrilla struggle.

FPRLZ maintained relations with Salvadoran Fuerzas Populares de Liberación, and later with FMLN when the front was more consolidated. In 1990 FPRLZ merged with other tendencies to form Partido Renovación Patriótica.

FPRLZ was named after the peasant leader Lorenzo Zelaya, who was murdered in 1965.

In October 1980 the organisation shot at the US embassy annex in Tegucigalpa and attacked the Chilean embassy with a bomb. In September 1981 they ambushed a US Mobile Training Team and detonated a bomb within the National Assembly. In April 1982 they attached the US, Chulean, Peruvian and Argentine embassies with automatic weapons and bombs. A commercial airliner was also highjacked; after the hostages were released the hijackers were permitted to fly to Cuba. In August 1982 the organisation exploded bombs at American and Salvadoran companies and at the British embassy; further bombs targeted subsidiaries of Castle & Cooke in November. An attack was made on the Guatemalan consulate in Tegucigalpa in March 1983 and in April 1987 a department store in the city was bombed.

== Bibliography ==
- Terrorist Group Profiles. Diane Publishing Company. April 1993.
- Niño, César (2026). "Honduras. Popular Revolutionary Forces Lorenzo Zelaya". In Ríos, Jerónimo; García de las Heras, Mariano (eds.). Guerrillas in Latin America. The Latin American Studies Book Series. Springer. doi:10.1007/978-3-031-97521-9_7.
- Brett, Edward T. (20 April 2009). Lorenzo Zelaya Popular Revolutionary Forces. The International Encyclopedia of Revolution and Protest. Wiley-Blackwell. doi:10.1002/9781405198073.wbierp0924.
