= 1980s in Honduras =

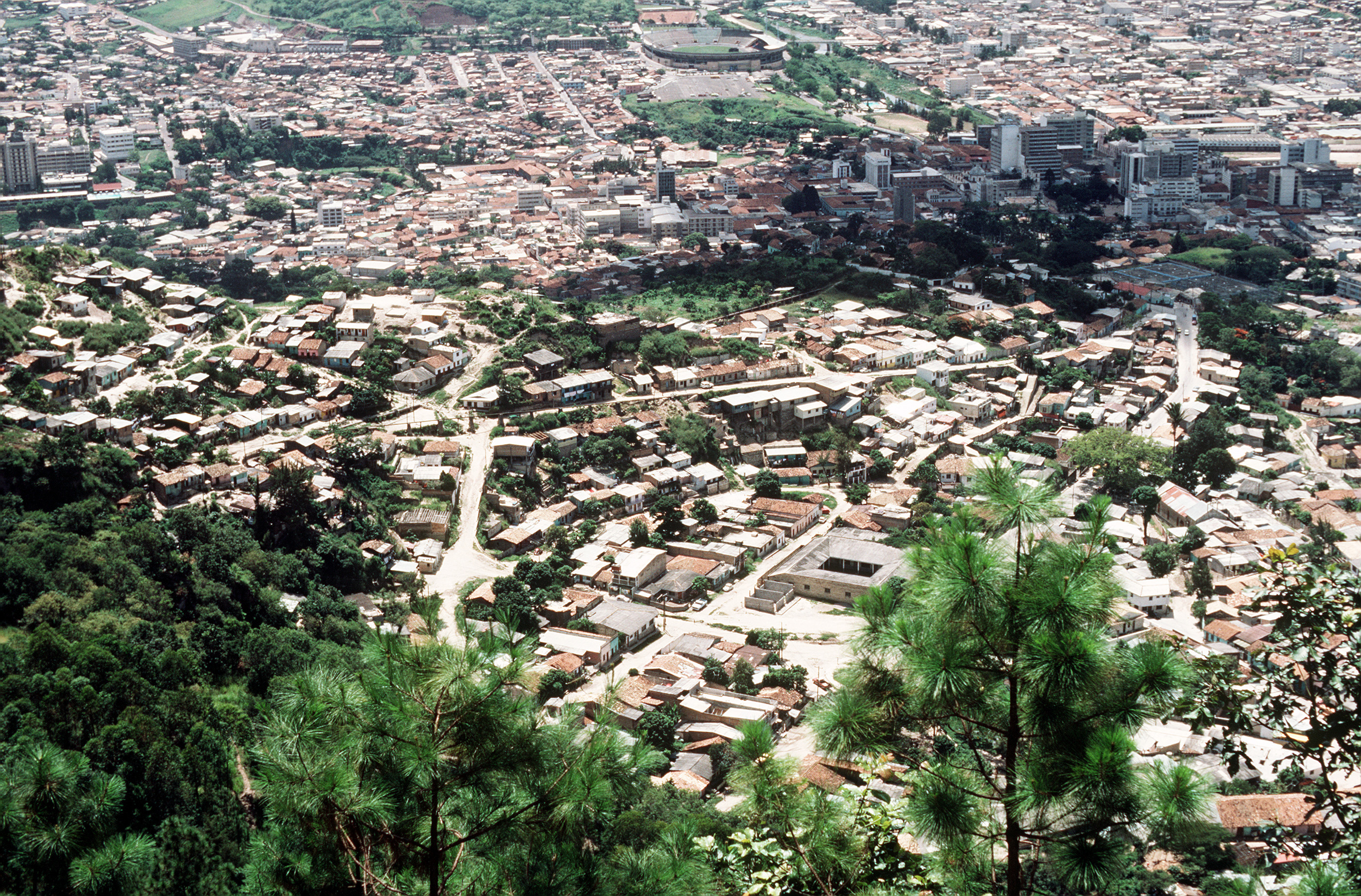
Tegucigalpa in 1983

The 1980s were one of the most tense, militarized, and politically transformative decades in modern Honduran history. Although there was no civil war as there has been in El Salvador, Guatemala, or Nicaragua, the country lived under regional pressure, with strong international influence, especially from the United States, and sporadic clashes with insurgent groups.

== Demographics ==
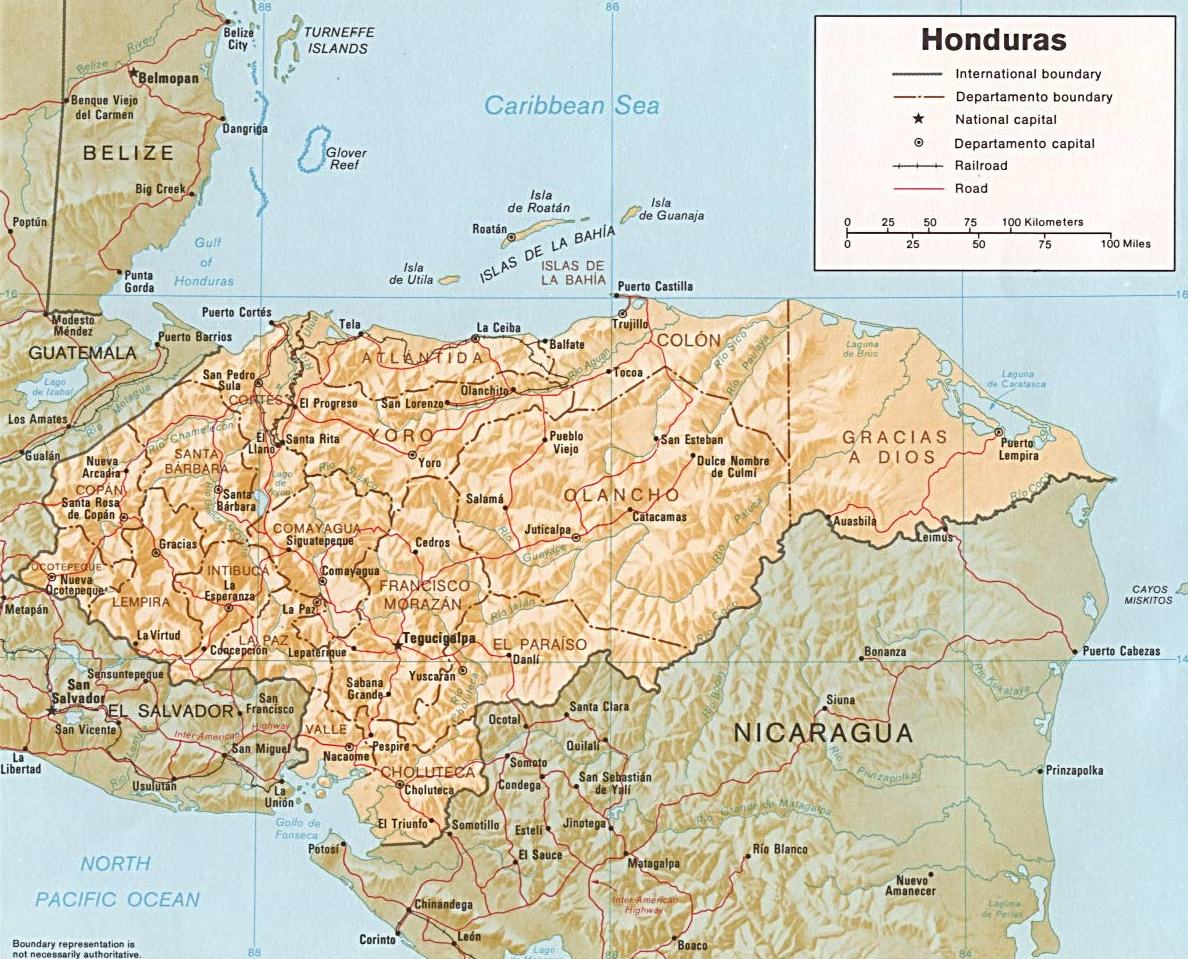
Map of Honduras, 1985

In the 1980s Honduras was a predominant rural but rapidly growing country, where almost every family had several children and where most of daily life unfolded amidst mountains, villages, and small towns. It wasn't uncommon to see 5 children per family.

The total population hovered around 4 million, much less than today, and it showed: the cities were smaller, quieter, with fewer cars, and neighborhoods ended abruptly, giving way to hills, pastures, and coffee plantations. Most people lived outside the cities, in rural areas where life was harder but more communal, defined by agriculture, harvests, and family traditions. Although Honduras did not experience a full-blown internal conflict, the regional situation generated: the presence of Nicaraguan and Salvadoran refugees, makeshift settlements with limited services, and a need for health and nutritional assistance.

== Economy ==
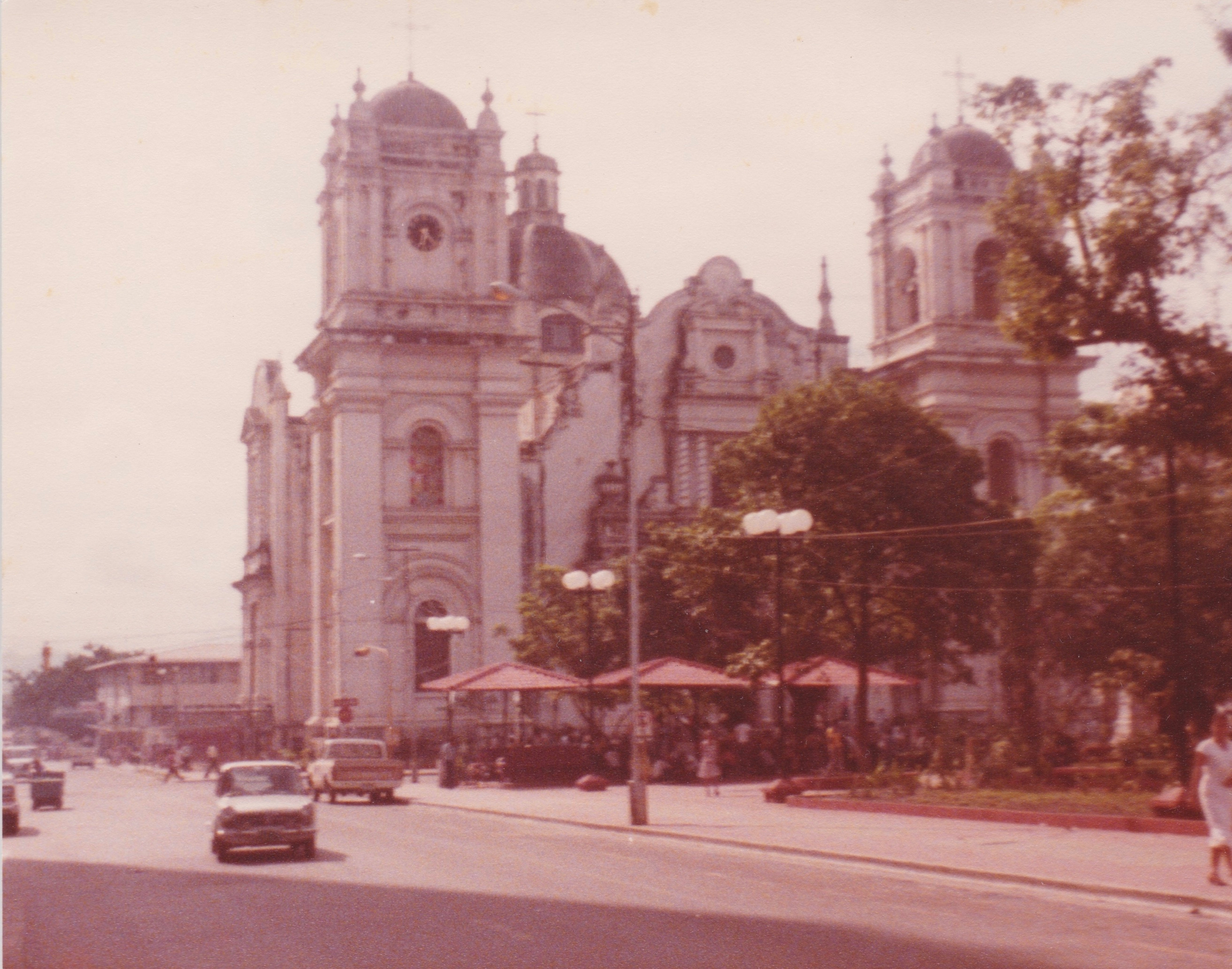
San Pedro Sula in 1980

In the 1980s Honduras experienced a fragile, dependent, and constantly strained economy, marked more by necessity than growth. It was a country where the majority of the population lived off the land and agricultural activity, where traditional exports sustained the national budget, and where almost everything depended on the weather, international prices, and aid from the United States. During the decade, there was a surge in external debt, devaluations of the lempira, persistent inflation, wages losing purchasing power, and few opportunities in the formal sector.

However, towards the end of the decade, between 1987 and 1989, the first maquiladora industry centers appeared in the northern region, especially in Choloma, La Lima, La Ceiba, and San Pedro Sula. These factories began to attract thousands of young people, especially women, even though the wages were low, the hours long, and the conditions demanding. Despite everything, there were some improvements driven by external cooperation such as new roads, bridges, hydroelectric plants, rural electrification systems, port expansions, and agricultural programs.

=== Finances ===
Honduran finances in the 1980s were marked by crises, indebtedness, external dependence, and a state that spent more than it could produce. It was a complicated decade economically, and public finances were a direct reflection of that situation.This meant the government owed more money than it could pay. A large portion of the budget went to interest payment and the Honduran government had to constantly renegotiate its debt. The IMF and the World Bank intervened with adjustment programs.

The lempira remained relatively stable against the dollar (L 2/USD). This stability was artificial and financed by foreign aid. Despite the fixed exchange rate, citizens' purchasing power fell due to inflation caused by external debt. The "value" of the lempira in those years was more a political decision than an economic reality.

The banking system was stable but limited; there were few private banks, all heavily regulated by state agencies. Credit was difficult for many families and small businesses, with high interest rates. Not to mention that there was a lot of bureaucracy involved in obtaining loans during that decade, making them almost hard to access to most of the population.

=== Health ===
in 1980 health situation in Honduras was characterized by structural limitations, a constant increase in demand for health services, and an unstable regional context due to armed conflicts in neighboring countries. Demographic pressure, poverty, and insufficient medical infrastructure created conditions of vulnerability for large sectors of the population. Although the public health system was composed of large hospitals and regional health centers, the rapid population growth gradually made it more obsolete and incapable of serving the large masses of people who needed medical attention.

As a result, during Roberto Suazo Córdova's presidency, hospital services were expanded, health centers were built, and the primary healthcare network was improved.The University Hospital in Tegucigalpa and the Mario Catarino Rivas Hospital in San Pedro Sula were strengthened (equipment, critical care areas, new programs). Numerous CESAMO and CESAR clinics were built with support from USAID and multilateral organizations. Mass vaccination campaigns and maternal and child health programs were expanded.

== Culture ==
Honduran culture experienced a unique blend of popular tradition, new foreign influences, and slow modernization processes in a country characterized by its youthful population and strong sense of community. While Honduras was never a mass producer of popular culture, it was a receiver and transformer of it, adapting it to its own context.

=== Music ===
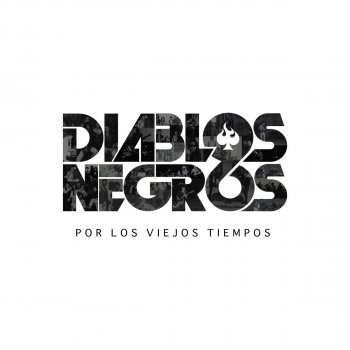
Diablos negros is a Hodnuran Rock ballad band formed in 1982 and still active today.

Although the music scene remained dominated by Spanish-language singer-songwriters, such as José José, Camilo Sesto, and Rocío Dúrcal, English-language groups increasingly gained a more prominent presence on the radio. It could be said that Mexico primarily inspired Honduras in romantic music, the United States in pop, and Latin rock, or rock en español, came from Spain and South America, inspiring Honduran groups like Diablos Negros.

TV and Cinema

Honduran television in the 1980s was a small, centralized system with few options, but it had an enormous cultural impact. For most Hondurans, it was the main window to the world and a major shaper of musical, cultural, and social tendencies. However, during the decade, Honduran television began to change drastically, with an exponential increase in productions from outside the Hispanic cultural sphere, such as Mexican productions. Many American programs that gained popularity in Honduras included The A-Team, Knight Rider, Lassie, ALF, Dynasty, and Dallas. Honduran television reached historic ratings during the World cups, especially Spain 82, which was the first time Honduras qualified for a World Cup, and Mexico 86, events that a huge part of the population watched live, narrated by national sports commentators.

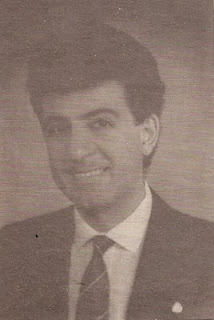
Tv host Salvador Nasralla, His career took off during the 1980s.

During the 1980s, Honduras experienced a phenomenon, the increase in anime productions on television. Although Japanese animated series had already aired on Honduran television in the 1970s, it was in the following decade that a significant increase in Japanese animation on national television was seen. However, during that decade it wasn't called "anime" it was simply known as Japanese cartoons, or many people even thought they came from the United States, China, or Mexico. It was a discreet but influential presence that impacted the children of the time without them even realizing they were experiencing Japanese culture. Honduras did not import anime directly from Japan; instead, Honduran television at the time bought programs already dubbed into Spanish by Televisa, Venevisión, the Spanish network TVE, and Mexican production companies like Intertrack. Therefore, many anime arrived with Mexican or Venezuelan dubs. Some notorious anime series broadcast by the time where Candy Candy, Heidi, Mazinger Z, Gatchaman, Robotech, Ulyses 31.

During the decade American productions began to stand out more than Spanish speaking productions compared to previous decades, which were mostly dominated by more dramatic films, primarily Mexican and other Latin American productions of a more realistic and mature nature. However, in the 1980s, Hollywood films began to dominate Honduran theaters. It could be said that the state of cinema in Honduras was dominated by American action films. Some of the most popular films in Honduras during the decade were Rambo II, Predator, Terminator, RoboCop, and Commando.

== Politics ==
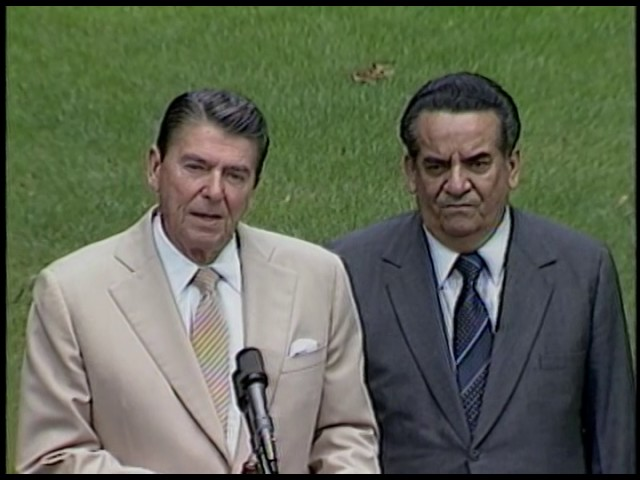
Reagan and Cordova during a meeting at the Rose Garden

Honduran politics in the 1980s was marked by a process of democratic transition, militarism, external influence, and regional tensions. As mentioned previously, although Honduras did not experience a full-blown civil war like its neighbors, its politics were profoundly shaped by the Cold War, clashes with sporadic insurgent groups, and Central American instability.

Electoral map of 1981, in red Liberals, on blue Nationalists.

The formal transition came in 1982, when a new Constitution was promulgated, a Congress was elected, and that year, for the first time since 1963, a civilian president, Roberto Suazo Córdova of the Liberal Party, took office. However, the transition was partial. The military retained considerable power; the head of the Armed Forces controlled security, intelligence, and strategic relations, thus limiting the president's authority due to the significant pressure exerted by the military.

The United States began to have a much stronger military presence in Honduras with the Soto Cano Air Base and the arrival of Honduran troops as part of Ronald Reagan's foreign policy and to seek to stop Soviet influence in his Central American homeland.

The 1985 election was unusual and controversial because the Liberal Party fielded several candidates simultaneously in the general election. The party agreement stipulated that the winner would be the candidate who received the most votes within the party, even if they did not represent a national majority. José Azcona Hoyo emerged as the most voted-for Liberal candidate and was declared president-elect. During Azcona's presidency, progress was made in civilian control of the police (although it remained under military control). Efforts were made to limit the political influence of the armed forces. He gradually reduced some large-scale US military exercises in the country. He promoted a more neutral role in regional conflicts and sought to ease tensions with Nicaragua.

=== Strengthening diplomatic ties ===
Honduras strengthened ties with Spain (which had already undergone a process of democratization since the death of Francisco Franco), especially in cultural cooperation, education programs, development aid, and presence in Ibero-American institutions on Honduran soil. There was also a close relationship with Mexico, which was a key ally due to its neutral role in the Central American peace negotiations. Thanks to this, there was cooperation in energy, educational scholarships, support for peace processes, and regional trade and transportation.

During the decade, Honduras strengthened diplomatic ties with Taiwan, especially on economic and humanitarian aid issues. In the mid-1980s, the relationship between Honduras and Japan strengthened. Japan began to take a more visible role in developing countries through JICA (Japan International Cooperation Agency). Although Honduras already had projects with JICA since the late 1970s, these intensified in the 1980s, especially in agricultural projects, technical training, rural development, and the training of Honduran technicians in Japan.

Honduras participated in international forums attended by countries of the Soviet bloc. Some diplomatic channels were activated with the USSR and Eastern Europe.Thanks to this, during 1986 to 1989, Honduras had greater openness to dialogue with socialist countries that were not part of the USSR, especially Hungary, Yugoslavia, and Checoslovakia. At the end of the decade, and during Esquipulas and the internationalization of Central American peace, Honduras opened more diplomatic channels with Brazil, Colombia, Venezuela, and Argentina.

== See also ==
- History of Honduras
- Central American crisis
