= Movimiento al Socialismo (Honduras) =

Movement for Socialism Movimiento al Socialismo
- Abbreviation: MAS
- Leader: José Antonio Cruz Oliva; Efraín Díaz Arrivillaga; Rodolfo Sorto Romero; Rafael Alegría; Oswaldo Discua; Juan Ramón Dermit; Melba Reyes
- Founded: March 1976
- Dissolved: 1978
- Succeeded by: PASO
- Ideology: Christian left Socialism
- National affiliation: DC

The Movement for Socialism (Spanish: Movimiento al Socialismo, abbreviated MAS) was a political movement in Honduras, active inside the Christian Democratic Party of Honduras (PDCH).}

== History ==
The split inside DC had begun to emerge in 1975. MAS was constituted at the Sixth National Plenum of the party in March 1976. MAS was founded by a younger generation within the PDCH, with leaders like José Antonio Cruz Oliva, Efraín Díaz Arrivillaga, Rodolfo Sorto Romero, Rafael Alegría, Oswaldo Discua, Juan Ramón Dermit, Melba Reyes and others. Many of its leaders came from university-based organization. Inside PDCH MAS confronted the "El Palo" faction for influence over the organization.

MAS sought to replace the leaderships inside popular organizations linked to the Christian Democratic movement. MAS activists founded the peasants organization Unión Nacional de Campesinos Auténticos de Honduras (UNCAH) in September 1977.

The MAS tendency was expelled from the party at the Seventh National Plenum of the party. Some MAS members, who had been expelled from PDCH, founded the Socialist Party (PASO) in November 1978. The MAS split significantly weakened the PDCH.
