= Morazanista National Liberation Party =

Morazanista National Liberation Party Partido Morazanista de Liberación Nacional
- Abbreviation: PMLN
- Dissolved: 1992
- Split from: PCMLH
- Merged into: UD
- Ideology: Communism; Revolutionary socialism
- Political position: Far-left

Partido Morazanista de Liberación Nacional was a leftist party in Honduras. PMLN was earlier known as Frente Morazanista para la Liberación de Honduras. FMLH had been formed as a breakaway of PCMLH. FMLH was a clandestine politico-military organization. FMLH was, however, mainly based in exile in neighbouring Nicaragua. According to one source, FMLH had 300 fighters at its peak.

In 1992, PMLN joined with three other groups to form the Democratic Unification Party.
