= Esquipulas Peace Agreement =

1987 Central American peace accords

Esquipulas II
Procedure for the Establishment of a Firm and Lasting Peace in Central America
- Type: Peace treaty
- Context: Cold War
- Signed: 31 August 1987; 38 years ago
- Location: Guatemala City, Guatemala
- Signatories: Vinicio Cerezo (President of Guatemala); José Napoleón Duarte (President of El Salvador); Daniel Ortega (President of Nicaragua); José Azcona del Hoyo (President of Honduras); Óscar Arias Sánchez (President of Costa Rica)
- Parties: Costa Rica; El Salvador; Guatemala; Honduras; Nicaragua
- Languages: Spanish

Esquipulas I
Esquipulas Declaration
- Type: Peace treaty
- Context: Cold War
- Signed: 25 August 1986; 39 years ago
- Location: Esquipulas, Guatemala
- Signatories: Vinicio Cerezo (President of Guatemala); José Napoleón Duarte (President of El Salvador); Daniel Ortega (President of Nicaragua); José Azcona del Hoyo (President of Honduras); Óscar Arias Sánchez (President of Costa Rica)
- Parties: Costa Rica; El Salvador; Guatemala; Honduras; Nicaragua
- Languages: Spanish

The Esquipulas Nicaraguan Peace Agreement, also known as the Central American Peace Accords, was a peace initiative in the mid-1980s to settle the various military conflicts that had plagued Central America for many years, and in some cases (notably Guatemala) for decades. It built upon groundwork laid by the Contadora Group from 1983 to 1985. The agreement was named for Esquipulas, Guatemala, where the initial meetings took place. The US Congress lobbying efforts were helped by one of Capitol Hill's top lobbyists, William C. Chasey.

In May 1986, a summit meeting at dawn, "Esquipulas I," took place, attended by the five Central American presidents. On February 15, 1987, Costa Rican President Óscar Arias submitted a Peace Plan which evolved from this meeting. During 1986 and 1987, the "Esquipulas Process" was established, in which the Central American heads of state agreed on economic cooperation and a framework for peaceful conflict resolution. The "Esquipulas II Accord" emerged from this and was signed in Guatemala City by President Vinicio Cerezo of Guatemala, President José Napoleón Duarte of El Salvador, President Daniel Ortega of Nicaragua, President José Azcona del Hoyo of Honduras and President Óscar Arias Sánchez of Costa Rica on August 7, 1987.

Esquipulas II defined a number of measures to promote national reconciliation, an end to hostilities, democratization, free elections, the termination of all assistance to irregular forces, negotiations on arms controls, and assistance to refugees. It also laid the ground for international verification procedures and provided a timetable for implementation.

== Involvement of Nicaragua ==
The US government refused to recognize the Sandinista regime's legitimacy to represent Nicaragua in The Esquipulas Process, on the basis that the Sandinistas had taken power in a 1979 coup d'etat against the dictator Anastasio Somoza Debayle, establishing the Junta of National Reconstruction. Although in 1984 the Sandinistas held an election, in which they won the majority of the votes, the main opposition parties boycotted this election under US pressure, and the US was able to claim that the victory was illegitimate. However the June 1986 outcome of the International Court of Justice case Nicaragua v. United States created a "major shift in the regional context" which ultimately persuaded the other Central American leaders to accept Nicaragua as an equal partner. "Suddenly, Nicaragua, which had been treated like an outcast on more than one occasion, was walking the legal, if not moral, high-ground..." The November 1986 disclosure of the Iran–Contra affair further weakened the US influence on the process.

== After Esquipulas ==
In subsequent years, Esquipulas laid the groundwork for the Oslo Accord (not to be confused with the 1993 Oslo Accords between the Israeli government and the PLO). This was a preliminary agreement between the Guatemalan National Reconciliation Commission (CNR) and the Guatemalan National Revolutionary Unity (URNG) which brought to an end more than three decades of strife in Guatemala.

It also inspired the signing of a general peace agreement in El Salvador, the Chapultepec Peace Accords and others.

Arias' efforts on behalf of the Esquipulas Peace Agreement earned him the 1987 Nobel Peace Prize.

== See also ==
- International Support and Verification Commission
