= Party for the Transformation of Honduras =

Party for the Transformation of Honduras Partido para la Transformación de Honduras
- Abbreviation: PTH
- Founded: 1967
- Dissolved: 1992
- Split from: PCH
- Merged into: UD
- Ideology: Communism; Marxism-Leninism; Maoism

The Party for the Transformation of Honduras (in Spanish: Partido para la Transformación de Honduras) was a political party in Honduras. PTH was earlier known as Partido Comunista Marxista-Leninista de Honduras (Marxist–Leninist Communist Party of Honduras).

PCMLH was founded in 1967 as a pro-Chinese break-away from Partido Comunista de Honduras. PCMLH was an illegal party, working mainly in student and peasant movements.

In 1992, PTH joined the Democratic Unification Party (UD). PTH does however, as the only one of the four founders of UD, maintained a separate party structure within UD. PTH was active within the tendency Convergencia Popular.
