= Communist Party of Honduras =

Communist Party of Honduras Partido Comunista de Honduras
- Leader: Manuel Calix Herrera (1928-1933). Rigoberto Padilla Rush (1954-1990).
- Founded: 1928; 2011 (reestablishment)
- Dissolved: 1990
- Split from: Honduran Revolutionary Democratic Party
- Ideology: Communism; Marxism-Leninism; Maoism

Party flag
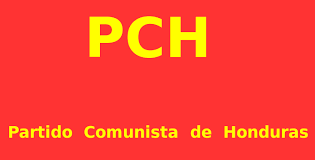

Communist Party of Honduras (Spanish: Partido Comunista de Honduras) is a Marxist-Leninist and Maoist party in Honduras. PCH was refounded on October 10, 1954, by Ramos Dionisio Bejarano and Rigoberto Padilla Rush. It had its roots in the Honduran Revolutionary Democratic Party. From the beginning, he maintained a strong presence in the workers union movement, especially the banana movement against the UFCO activities in Honduras.

== History ==
=== 1928-1932 ===
The first Communist Party of Honduras was founded in 1928 by Manuel Calix Herrera and Juan Pablo Wainwright Nuila, who had attempted to found a Socialist Party of Honduras a year earlier. The first Plenum of the Communist Party of Honduras was held in the house of Juan Pablo Wainwright in 1930.

==== 1931 elections ====
The Communist Party of Honduras would participate in the presidential elections of which Tiburcio Carías Andino would be the winner. The first Communist Party of Honduras was dissolved with the execution of Juan Pablo Wainwright, in 1932, by the dictatorship of Jorge Ubico of Guatemala and the death of Manuel Calix Herrera, in 1935.

=== 1954-1990 ===
PCH reborn in 1954 and was claimed by the government to be an illegal party. It developed a strong presence in the trade union movement, for example amongst banana plantations. In the mid-1960s, the U.S. State Department estimated the party membership to be approximately 2400. However, in 1965 the party split into two factions because of the Sino-Soviet split. The party was between the traditionalists who supported the USSR and those who supported the Maoist model of the People's Republic of China.

=== Dissolution ===
In 1990, PCH was dissolved, and merged into Patriotic Renovation Party.The party was reactivated during the celebration of its fifth Congress in 2011.

== See also ==
- Central American crisis
