= Second Honduran Civil War =

1924 civil war in Honduras

- Part of the Banana Wars
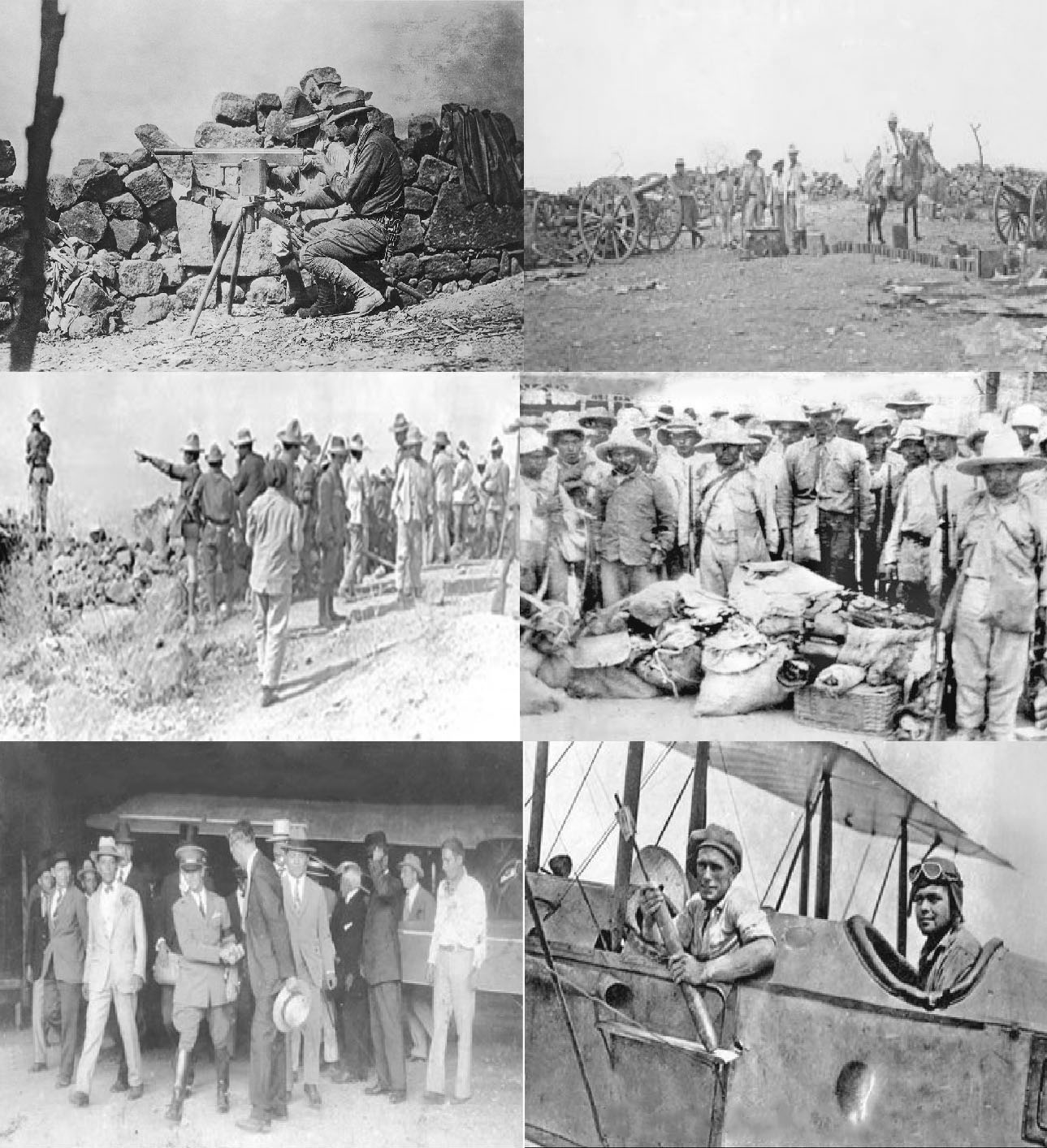
- Left to right: Machine gun nest · Soldiers in the field, · Troops in Tegucigalpa · Vicente Carrasco's troops · Reception of Colonel Fierro at Toncontín Airport · Pilots before a bombing
Date	2 February 1924 – 1 May 1924 (2 months, 4 weeks and 1 day)
Location	Honduras
Result	Constitutionalist Army victory: American intervention; Resignation of President Rafael López Gutiérrez

Belligerents
(Honduras) Honduran Army; United States: United States military	(Honduras) Constitutionalist Army

Commanders and leaders
(Honduras) Rafael López Gutiérrez	(Honduras) General Tiburcio Carías Andino

Casualties and losses
1,200	1,800

The Second Honduran Civil War (Spanish: Segunda guerra civil hondureña), also known as the Reclamation Revolution (Spanish: Revolución Reivindicatoria), was a civil war that took place in Honduras in 1924. This was the first conflict in Honduras where airplanes were used for aerial bombardment, and new war tactics inherited from the First World War were employed.

== Background ==
=== Post First Civil War government (1919–1924) ===
General Rafael López Gutiérrez, who had become President of Honduras, annulled the result of the 1919 general elections for president. The candidates in 1919 were Dr. Juan Ángel Arias Boquín for the “Arismo” Movement of the Honduran Liberal Party, Dr. Policarpo Bonilla, former president of the nation and candidate of the “Constitutional Liberal Party,” and Doctor Tiburcio Carias Andino, candidate of the National Party of Honduras. López Gutiérrez, not satisfied with the results, ordered that the National Congress could not resolve by ruling in favor of the virtual winner who would be Carias Andino by obtaining the majority of votes and as the candidate of the National Party.

=== López attempt to stay in power ===
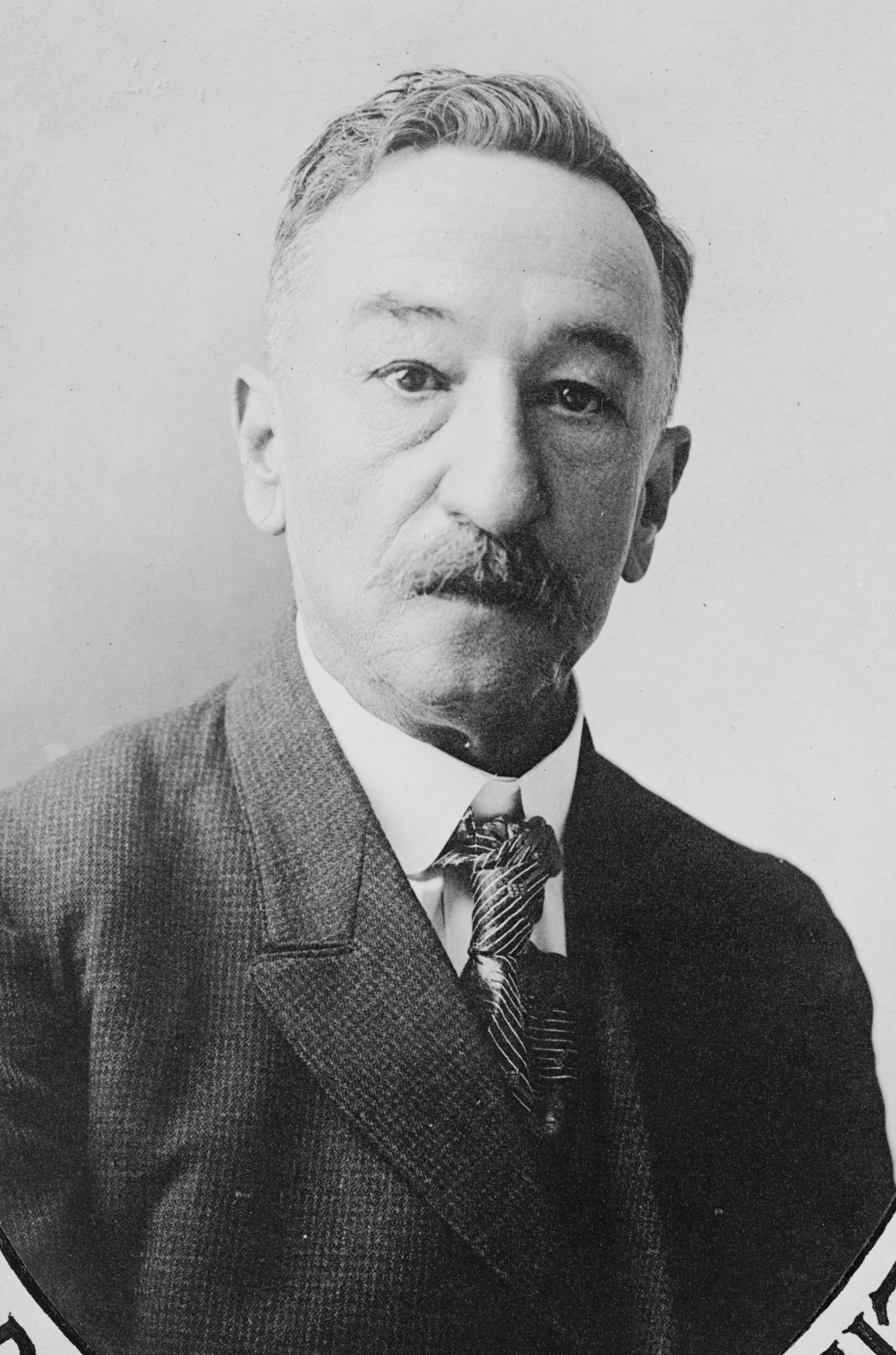
General Rafael López Gutiérrez, leader of the United Rebel Army during the First Honduran Civil War of 1919, attempted to stay in power, to the disapproval of half of the Liberal Party members, and the complete disapproval of the National Party.

On January 30, 1924, the settlement plan between the Liberal Party and the National Party was deemed to have failed. These conversations were known as "Plan Paz Barahona".

As there was no agreement, General Tiburcio Carías and the Dr. Juan Ángel Arias, together with 15 Cariístas and 18 Aristas from the Chamber of Deputies, supported Dr. Miguel Paz Barahona to be president of the nationcountry in the National Congress of Honduras. As such, General Tiburcio Carias Andino secretly left the capital, Tegucigalpa, at 7:00 p.m., along with him several armed and leftist friends of his. His departure was interpreted as a signal to begin a war, and during the night, others left the capital to join the ranks of the newly formed "Revolution". January 31, 1924, was the last day of the Constitutional Government. The National Congress held a session in the afternoon, with the assistance of the Diplomatic Corps, but there was not enough quorum and the session was adjourned at 5:00 p.m. Later, another session was held to select a president, or even a presidential designate, at the last minute, but there was still no quorum. At 9:00 p.m., the National Congress adjourned indefinitely. President López Gutiérrez proclaimed himself dictator the next day, on February 1, 1924.2

Members of the opposing Liberal Party and the National Party saw López Gutiérrez as a threat to democracy in Honduras and national security, since the General commanded and managed the Armed Forces of Honduras at will. On February 1, important social, political and executive Hondurans, including businessman Don Santos Soto Rosales, the wealthiest Honduran; engineer Héctor Medina Planas; attorney José María Matute; former Tegucigalpa Governor Raúl Toledo López; F. Alfredo Medrano, Guillermo Moncada, former Minister of War Dionisio Gutiérrez, left for El Salvador, along with other officers such as General Jacobo Galindo, General Joaquín Medina Planas, General Ramón Alvarado Mendieta, and Colonel Ricardo Lardizábal. A contingent of revolutionary troops, under the command of General J. Innocente Triminio Osorio, had left Tegucigalpa on January 30 and gathered a group of 300followers of the Barrio Viera.

During the First Honduran Civil War in 1920, the Honduran government had been fascinated by the power of the air armed wing, which had its scenarios in the First World War, and it bought its first British aircraft, a Bristol F.2B registered H-9.3, followed by more aircraft between 1921 and 1923, fundamental weapons in this new civil war. Meanwhile, López Gutiérrez declared a "state of siege" and mobilizeds his troops.

=== International reaction ===
On February 27, 1924, the governments of China, Spain, France, the United Kingdom, and Italy demanded the United States government to protect its citizens living in Honduras. At the time the country experienced an economic boom that led many Chinese, European (Spaniards, French, Italian, Jewish), and Arab immigrants to arrive to Honduras. Northern Honduras regions had a multitude of English speaking communities. Because of this, the United States played a role during the war by sending in warships.

== Movements ==
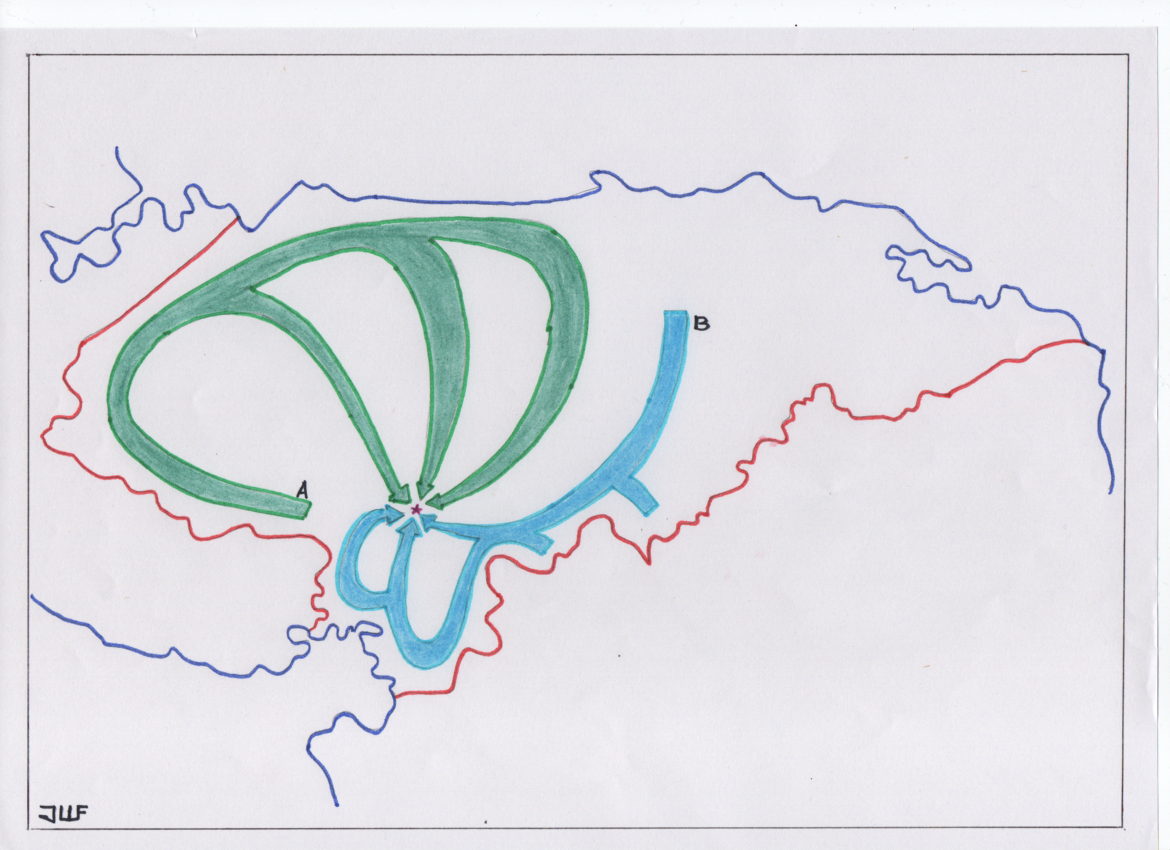
Military movements of the war.

=== Western Honduras ===
On February 3, General Vicente Tosta Carrasco and General Gregorio Ferrera took the town square of Marcala for the revolution and march towards the west of the country.

=== Central Honduras ===
By February 4, General Mariano Bertrand Anduray in command of 300 men had taken the Plaza of the city of Siguatepeque.

=== Northern Honduras ===
On February 4, Yoro Square was attacked by a revolutionary force under the command of Colonel Abraham López and Colonel Emeterio Rivera. Several men died in combat, including Colonel López and Colonel Timoteo Reyes.

=== Proclamation of the revolution to the dictator ===
On February 5, in the town of "Las Manos", near the border with the Republic of Nicaragua, the General Staff of the Constitutional Army issued a statement for General López Gutiérrez, supporting Dr. Tiburcio Carias Andino as the rightful President of Honduras.

== The Honduran government asks for financial aid ==
On February 5, the Minister of the Interior and Justice, Dr. José Ángel Zúñiga Huete, asked businessmen, bankers and other Honduran and foreign merchants for the sum of US$200,000 in order to crush the proclaimed revolution and lift the country. Some of them refused to grant loans and a few others voluntarily gave money. The U.S. Ambassador to Honduras, Franklin E. Morales, left Tegucigalpa in order to meet with Carias Andino and propose a solution.

=== Western Honduras ===
On February 7, the city of Gracias fell to rebel forces commanded by Generals Vicente Tosta Carrasco and Gregorio Ferrera, who then continued to Santa Rosa de Copán.

=== Battle of Jacaleapa ===
The battle was fought on February 9 outside Jacaleapa, near the Nicaraguan border, between the revolutionary forces commanded by Generals José Innocente Triminio and Camilo R. Reina Rivera, Colonels Pedro Francisco Triminio, Constantino S. Ramos, Manuel Valladares Núñez, Ricardo Lozano, and Armando B. Reina; and the government forces, under the command of Generals Sánchez, Teófilo Cárcamo, Cámbar, Fonseca and Mejía. Although details are lacking, it is known that there were many deaths and injuries. General Cárcamo was wounded and taken prisoner by the Revolutionaries. The Revolutionaries had to withdraw after running out of ammunition. Among the heads of the revolutionary forces were officers, including General José Innocente Triminio and General Camilo R. Reina Rivera, officers Colonel Pedro Francisco Triminio, Colonel Constantino S. Ramos, Colonel Manuel Valladares Núñez, Colonel Ricardo Lozano, Colonel Armando B. Reina, and others. In the thick of the battle the revolutionaries have done feats of courage and recklessness. Colonel Armando B. Reina has been mortally wounded in the fighting, when he threw himself on a machine gun of the dictatorial forces. Colonel Pedro Francisco Triminio has been seriously wounded, Colonel Ricardo Lozano has received four bullets that have left him in serious condition, despite their inferior weapons, the revolutionary forces are in good shape.

=== Western Honduran front ===
Feb. 10. The Plaza of the city of Santa Rosa de Copán is taken at the hands of the rebel forces under the command of General Vicente Tosta Carrasco and General Gregorio Ferrera. The Plaza of the city of Ocotepeque voluntarily joined the revolutionaries.

=== Central Honduras ===
Feb. 10. Honduran government espionage detects that in the vicinity of the town of Lamaní, there is a rebel barracks with 2,000 men ready to take Tegucigalpa under the command of General Bertrand Anduray. The ruler López Gutiérrez sends forces to the outskirts of the capital, placing machine guns and cannons on the Cerro "el Picacho", the hill "el Berrinche", the hill "Sipile" and the hill "Juan A. Laínez" in order to protect and detain an attack.

Northwest

February 13. The city of Santa Bárbara falls, without much resistance to the rebel generals Tosta Carrasco and Ferrera. General Tosta continued through the Valleys of Quimistan in order to reach San Pedro Sula.

=== Eastern Honduran front ===
February 13. The city of San Marcos de Colón is attacked by the rebels under the command of General Francisco Martínez Fúnez, around 45 were killed, the garrison in the Plaza resisted and repelled the attack, the rebels fled to the border with Nicaragua.

Puerto Cortes

The USS "Rochester" cruiser of the US Navy is anchored in Puerto Cortés awaiting orders.

=== Southern Honduras ===
February 14. The American cruiser USS "Milwaukee", of 7,200 tons and 110,000 horsepower, has anchored in the Amapala bay.

18 February. General Leonardo Nuila has recovered the square of the city of La Paz, after a short shootout against the revolutionary forces under the command of Colonel Moisés Nazar, who the next day, in a counterattack

=== Battle of "El Pedregalito" ===
February 20. The government troops under the command of General Peralta arrive at night at the place "Alauca", four leagues from "Pedregalito" and "Sabana Redonda", where General Tiburcio Carías Andino is with his army. At about 5:00 a.m., a fierce combat began that lasted all day, from which many dead and wounded on both sides have emerged. The revolutionaries despite their dangerous shortage of ammunition, sustained the long and continuous fire of the government army. Among the revolutionary leaders were General José Innocente Triminio, General Mariano Sanabria and General Camilo R. Reina, and Colonel Pedro Triminio, Colonel Calixto Carías, Colonel Constantino S. Ramos, Colonel Manuel Valladares Núñez and others. Colonel Carías was seriously wounded. After the battle, and due to lack of a park and sufficient weapons, the revolutionary forces had to withdraw from the site, taking the dictatorial forces.

=== Battle of Comayagua ===
February 21. General Gregorio Ferrera attacked in the early hours and by surprise the Plaza of the colonial city and former capital of Comayagua, the government commander has ordered the counteroffensive. February 22. They continue fighting fiercely in the city and surroundings, General Ferrera's forces are gaining ground. On February 23, after two days and one night of terrible fighting, Comayagua has fallen into the power of the revolutionary army headed by General Gregorio Ferrera, the informative part also assures that the Commander and Dr. José María Ochoa Velásquez, former vice president of the nation and Colonel Salomón Sorto Z., who were defending the town hall and the plaza, have escaped unharmed and fled to Tegucigalpa, Colonel José María Navas Gardela, died in combat.

=== Center ===
26 of February. The "Gutierrista" government sent a strong contingent to the town of "Zambrano" with orders to stop General Ferrera's advance on the capital. The day after, on (February 27), more troops leave for “Zambrano”. The Military Red Cross is organized.

=== North Coast ===
General Vicente Tosta Carrasco met in Buffalo with the officials of the government troops that were defending San Pedro Sula, as there was no surrender agreement for the latter and the threat that said forces would attack the revolutionaries of Tosta. 27 February, the governmental General Carlos Lagos, commanding 6,000 men, plans the attack on the 2,000 rebels commanded by General Vicente Tosta Carrasco -a military academy- who devised the following strategy: He left in "Calpules" around 60 men and flags with the In order to deceive the enemy, meanwhile he with the bulk of his forces moved by forced march to the heights where he could dominate the site, and attack the "gutierrista" troops in an enveloping movement, in effect, at 8:00 am the forces Dictatorials attacked the diminished revolutionary positions located in “Calpules” (Agua Prieta), assaulting and taking them without any apparent difficulty. At that time, General Tosta ordered the attack on his army, surprising the officers and enemy troops, the fight spread through "Trinchera" (Choloma) where Colonel "Chicho" Matute lost his life, in "Cerro Will", " Cofradía ”,“ Palmar ”and“ Choloma ”, are fought hard for three days (February 27, 28 and 29), the dictatorial Army gradually loses ground, until, realizing that it had lost the battle and seeing itself in danger of being completely annihilated, he began to retreat to the northwest, leaving San Pedro Sula at the mercy of the Revolution, the defeated officers were: Carlos Lagos, Salvador Cisneros, Luis Mejía Moreno, Gonzalo Navarro and José María Escoto in whom the dictator Rafael López Gutiérrez had a lot of faith .

February 28. In the city of La Ceiba there is another meeting between the government and revolutionary forces, all due to the fact that the banana transnational United Fruit Company gave its support to Doctor and General Tiburcio Carias Andino. On March 1, the squares of the port city of Tela also fell. The United States breaks diplomatic relations with Honduras and sends the USS Denver6 to the shores of the Honduran Caribbean, to safeguard its own interests.

=== San Pedro Sula ===
March 3. General Vicente Tosta Carrasco enters the city of San Pedro Sula in triumph and without any opposition. General Gregorio Ferrera, then marched towards the center of the country to attack the cities of Siguatepeque and Zambrano

=== Battle of Zambrano ===
In March 4 the battle of Zambrano took place between government forces and those of General Ferrera. The revolutionaries triumphed and the army had to hastily retreat to the capital, abandoning a cannon and many supplies. Giving an account of this combat, General Ferrera says:

“Yesterday, at 4:30 p.m., we suddenly collided with a strongly entrenched enemy in these fields. Our cavalry was surprised and almost defeated; but was immediately supported by the brave colonels Cristóbal Gutiérrez, Pedro G. Domínguez, Fulgencio Machado and Blas Domínguez. The gunfire started with extreme violence. At 5:30 it was ordered to Colonels Pragedes García and Juan Z. Pérez an attack from our right, which was done with energy. This attack began to make the enemy hesitate. At 7 pm, a machete charge was ordered. Thus we managed to remove from the forces of the dictatorship their first positions; but the fight continued during the night and hopefully it varied until today at 8 in the morning, which we definitely succeed. One thousand three hundred men were lost, equipped with artillery, machine guns and abundant cartridges, Commanded by Generals Máximo B. Rosales, Julio Peralta, Francisco Cardona and Fonseca and several colonels who constantly received aid in men and weapons from the capital. We captured 2 Thompson machine guns and part of the war train .Among our dead is the ill-fated Colonel Cristóbal Gutiérrez, and Colonels Machado and Domínguez (Pedro G.) and several others whoI will nominate in due course. Our wounded have already been brought to Comayagua. The disaster of the dictatorships has been complete; but we have necessary to make great efforts, since the elements that we fight constituted the essential and select for the Dictatorship''.

=== Center ===
7 of March. General Ferrera has advanced with his army to the heights of the town of Santa Cruz, two leagues from the Honduran capital Tegucigalpa.

=== Sabotage in Tegucigalpa ===
March 9, 1924. The Honduras Post Office building, the National Warehouse and the General Revenue Administration building have been destroyed by a voracious fire, allegedly caused by spies of the revolution. The representatives of the diplomatic corps of the countries with which Honduras has a relationship, order their compatriots to close their offices and protect themselves from an imminent attack on the Honduran capital. US Ambassador Franklin E. Morales requests the possible intervention of his country's military. President Calvin Coolidge ordered the USS Milwaukee to be stationed in the Gulf of Fonseca. On March 11, 1924, about 200 marines disembarked, and at 11:00 hours they arrived in Tegucigalpa (110 km) and besieged it.

=== Ultimatum of general Gregorio Ferrera ===
While an armistice was being resolved between the parties and some diplomats interested in resolving the war situation, the revolutionary general Ferrera urged the parties for an Armistice that would end on March 13 at 5:00 p.m., the Dictatorial Government did not he would resolve to hand over the Tegucigalpa plaza to the rebels; consequently, hostilities would break out and the total attack on the Honduran capital would begin.

President López Gutiérrez, leaves the administration in charge of a Council of Ministers headed by Doctor and General Francisco Bueso Cuéllar, who governs from March 10 to April 30, 1924, after which he hands over General and politician Fausto Dávila who governs from March 27 to 31. Although the doctor and general Tiburcio Carias Andino had proclaimed himself president when he took Tegucigalpa between February 9 to March 24 and from this date to April 28, 1924, in parallel to the Council of Ministers that López Gutiérrez had indicated before his departure outside Honduras and that he would find death due to his illness (diabetes mellitus) on March 10 at 4:00 p.m. The Council of Ministers that exercised the Executive Power of Honduras requested a truce from the rebels, in order to carry out the funeral of Rafael López Gutiérrez, in the General Cemetery, on Tuesday, March 11, in the afternoon.

Ferrera's ultimatum was taken seriously by the citizens of the Honduran capital who did not sleep through the night waiting for the aforementioned attack, although there was none, the rebels did prepare to the teeth to do it in a more tactical way. Meanwhile, on March 13, General Vicente Tosta Carrasco attacked La Ceiba together with General Filiberto Díaz Zelaya, the fall resulted in many deaths and injuries and a part of the city destroyed.

== Aerial bombardment of the Honduran capital ==
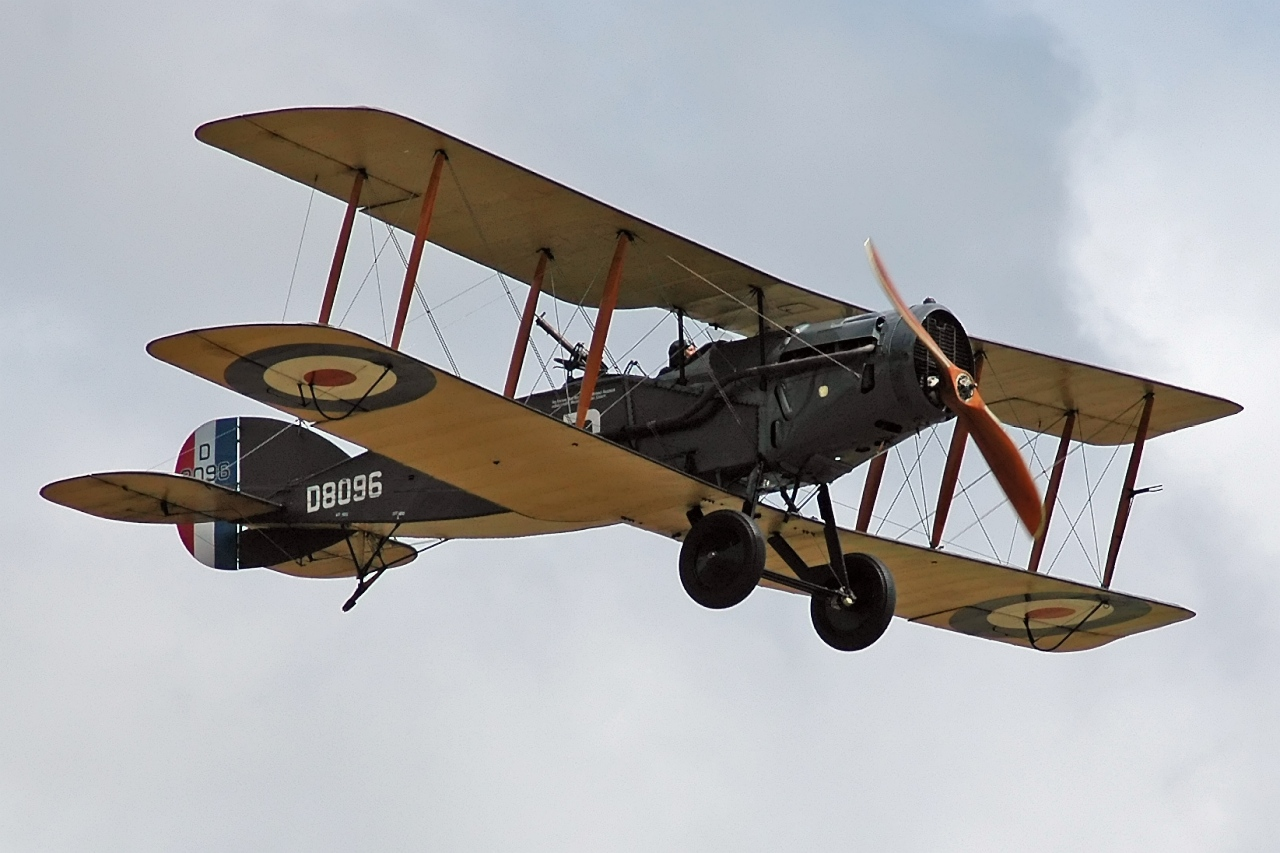
The Bristol plane became the first aerial machine to bomb a Latin American city.

The city of Tegucigalpa became the first capital of Latin America to be bombed, the revolution had two planes of which the airmen dropped the bombs by hand, the government forces only had the Bristol plane. On April 9, the revolutionary airplane bombards the city in the morning and in the afternoon. In the morning: He has dropped four bombs on "Parque La Leona", one of them 200 meters from the British Embassy; another bomb has fallen about 25 meters from the Normal School located in the “La Alhambra” building. Other bombs have fallen in the center of the city of Tegucigalpa, two of them in the house of Ms. Prisca Ugarte, and 7 meters from the Embassy of Mexico, another 20 meters from the Embassy of Guatemala, this one killed two girls and left several women seriously injured. Likewise, two more unexploded bombs were collected, one 5 meters from Francisco Antúnez's house and another in a courtyard near the San Francisco Barracks.

=== Center ===
General Gregorio Ferrera leaves part of his constitutional revolutionary army under the orders of the commanders of the revolution in the center and goes south to take Choluteca, Ferrera would not arrive in the city until 03:00 in the morning at the head of his army that he had no obstacles in taking the Cholutecan plaza, since the officer in charge of that place, General Toribio Ramos, had left with his 500 men and other supplies, leaving the city abandoned.

=== Paper bombing in the capital ===
The revolutionary airplane has dropped on the city of Tegucigalpa, an endless number of flying papers addressed to the government soldiers in command of the dictatorial Government Council, in which they allude to lay down their arms, surrender or join the constitutional revolution. General Toribio Ramos enters the capital with a column of soldiers related to the dictatorial government.

== Foreign diplomatic corps ==
To request a total ceasefire, a negotiating body has been formed made up of diplomats accredited in the country, being the following: Franklin E. Morales, Minister Plenipotentiary and Special Envoy of the United States of America; Mr. G. Lyall, Chargé d'Affaires of England; Dr. José María Bonilla, Chargé d'Affaires of Guatemala; Dr. Pablo Campos Ortíz, Head of the Mexican Legation; Mr. Anselmo Rivas G., Minister Plenipotentiary and Envoy Extraordinary of Nicaragua and Dr. Bernardino Larios H., Chargé d'Affaires of El Salvador, the persons who will listen to the full voice of the representatives of the parties in conflict.

=== Request for a peace conference ===
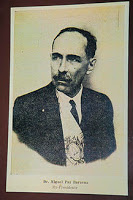
Dr. Miguel Paz Barahona.

The port of the island of Amapala in southern Honduras was chosen, and summoned by the delegate for the United States of America Mr. Summer Welles, Minister Franklin Morales, General Gregorio Ferrera who has accepted the participation in the conference, they presented themselves Both parties were ready for said conference: Due to the Constitutional Revolution, the list was made up of the following personalities: Doctor Fausto Dávila, General Vicente Tosta Carrasco, Doctor Miguel Paz Barahona (already released), Doctor Silverio Laínez and Doctor José María Casco. The list presented by the Council of Ministers indicated: Doctor Francisco Bueso Cuéllar, Doctor Carlos Alberto Uclés, Doctor Federico C. Canales, Doctor and General Roque J. López and Doctor and General José María Ochoa V. Meanwhile, Doctor López has resigned from the Ministry of War and Navy to attend the Conference, and Dr. José Ángel Zúñiga Huete will be appointed Minister in his place.

==== Counterattack on the capital ====
On April 21, heavy artillery pieces fell on the Casa Presidencial de Honduras, the Banco de Honduras S. A. building and its surroundings without causing serious damage or death.

Peace conference. On April 23, 1924, the deliberative parties were present on the USS “Milwaukee” cruiser commanded by Admiral Dayton, thus beginning negotiations between the revolutionaries and the government.

== Fall of Tegucigalpa ==
On April 28, the capital is taken by an offensive of the revolution. At 9:30 p.m. the troops of the Revolution, under the immediate command of General Vicente Tosta Carrasco, cross the river in front of the Manuel Bonilla National Theater, La Concordia Park and the municipal Pantheon, and continue down the “El Berrinche” towards the center of the city. The first columns of General Tosta Carrasco take over the Market, the Honduras Telegraph building and the Police headquarters.

Other rebel columns penetrate the surroundings of the Pantheon, under a shower of bullets launched by machine guns from the hill “El Sipile”. General Martínez Fúnez's troops enter through the site of “Guanacaste” and through the slopes of the “Juan A. Laínez” hill, reaching the “Isla” sector and on the other side over the San Francisco Barracks. Meanwhile, a revolutionary column under the command of Colonel Carlos B. González and other leaders, attack and take the Veterans Barracks, and march on the Presidential Palace.

== Appointment of new president ==
On April 28 and after many talks and broken agreements, the Peace Conference reaches a key moment, a ceasefire is agreed and at around 12:30 p.m. General Vicente Tosta Carrasco is appointed as Provisional President, the same On April 30 at 10:00 a.m., he took an oath of promise to the Law before the Mayor of Tegucigalpa, then he went to the Honduran Presidential House where, as of May 1, he takes office and summons the delegations Central American countries to report the facts. Tosta Carranza performs his administrative functions lightly, on May 22 he sent a letter to the President of the United States Calvin Cooldige.

== Military tactics ==
The modernizatrion of the Honduran army led to new war tactics, most of them introduced thanks to the technological advances seen during the First World War. The most notable of them, were:

- Nocturnal attacks, mostly used to attack government buildings.
- Use of the Gatling machine gun and Thompson submachine gun.
- Use of the airplane
- The car was used for the transportation of troops
- Trenches were used to defend positions
- The participation of mercenaries from the Mexican Revolution and the First World War.

== Consequences ==
The war cost more than 2 million dollars in the damage of infrastructure, many historical buildings of Tegucigalpa were damaged by guns, the Market and national mail were burned to the ground. Is supposed that more than 3,000 identified soldiers were killed in battle, most of their bodies were buried in common pits, and there's a non identified number of wounded and disappeared troops, more than 50 identified civilians died during the attacks. This war costed the loss of diplomatic relations of Honduras between its neighborhoods, several other nations, and the United States. There was another military insurrection against Tosta Carrasco. All this instability gave rise to the Carias Andino Dictatorship.

== See also ==
- First Honduran Civil War
- Honduras in World War I
- Honduras in World War II
- History of Honduras (1838–1932)
