= Banana Wars =

Series of conflicts in Central America and the Caribbean

- Part of the aftermath of the Spanish–American War and the Interwar period
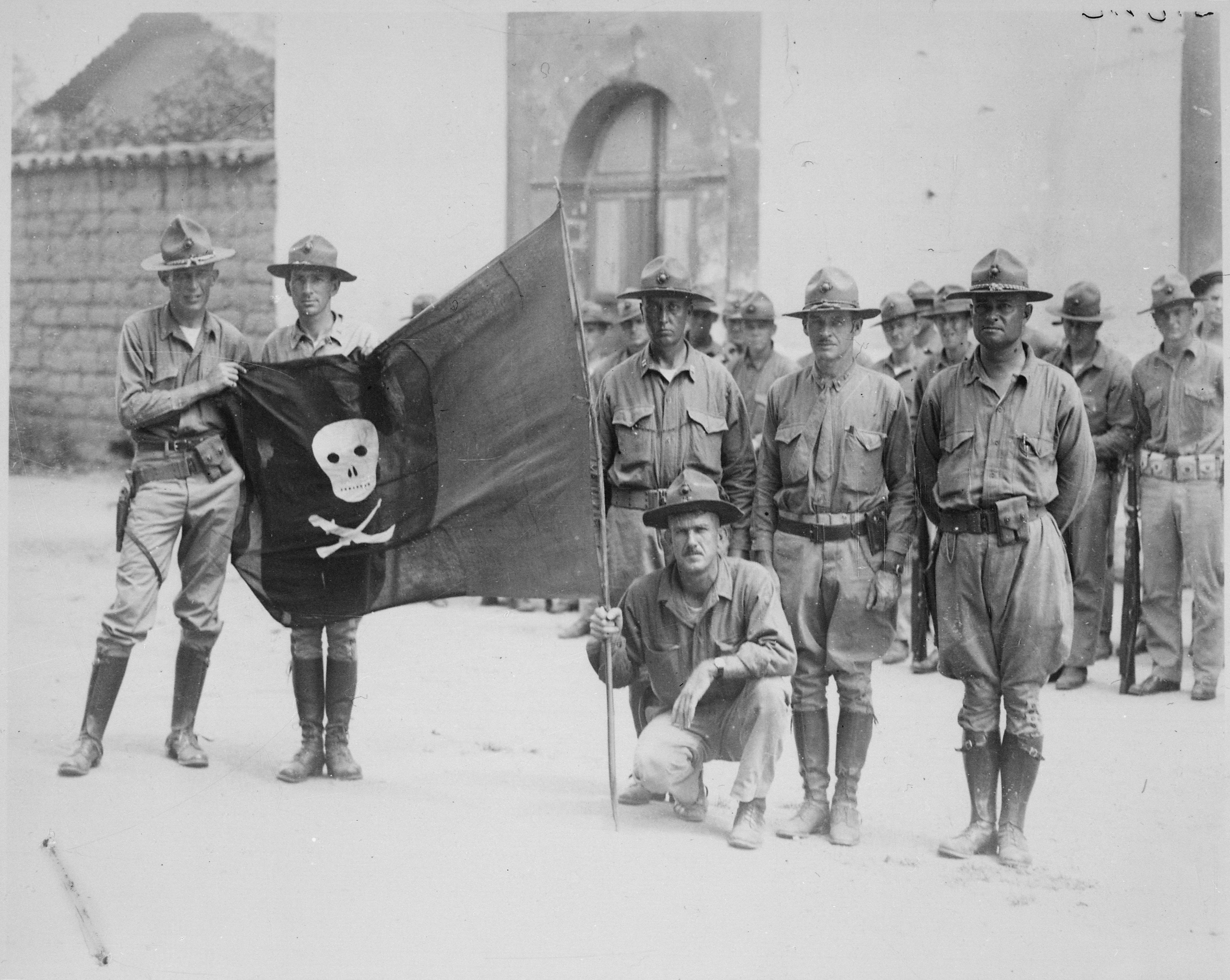
- US Marines with the captured flag of Augusto César Sandino in Nicaragua in 1932
- Objective: To enforce American and private interests in Central America and the Caribbean
- Date: August 13, 1898 (Note: The United States declared war on Spain on April 25, 1898, but dated the beginning of the war retroactively to April 21. This war ended on August 13, 1898. The Spanish-American War is not one of the Banana Wars.) – August 1, 1934 (35 years, 11 months, 2 weeks and 5 days)
- Executed by: United States
- Outcome: Santo Domingo Affair; Border War; Negro Rebellion; Occupation of Nicaragua; Occupation of Haiti; Occupation of the Dominican Republic; First Honduran Civil War; Second Honduran Civil War; Second Cuban Intervention; Sugar Intervention
- Casualties: 402 US Marines dead (1915–34)

The Banana Wars (Spanish: Guerras bananeras, Haitian Creole: Lagè Bannann) were a series of conflicts that consisted of military occupation, police action, and intervention by the United States in Central America and the Caribbean between the end of the Spanish–American War in 1898 and the inception of the Good Neighbor policy in 1934. The military interventions were primarily carried out by the United States Marine Corps, which developed a manual, the Small Wars Manual (1921), based on their experiences. On occasion, the United States Navy provided gunfire support, and the United States Army also deployed troops.

With the Treaty of Paris signed in 1898, control of Cuba, Puerto Rico, Guam, and the Philippines fell to the United States (surrendered from Spain). The United States conducted military interventions in Cuba, Panama, Honduras, Nicaragua, Mexico, Haiti, and the Dominican Republic. These conflicts ended when the U.S. withdrew from Haiti in 1934 under President Franklin D. Roosevelt.

The term "banana wars" was popularized in 1983 by writer Lester D. Langley. Langley wrote several books on Latin American history and American intervention, including: The United States and the Caribbean, 1900–1970 and The Banana Wars: An Inner History of American Empire, 1900–1934. His work regarding the Banana Wars encompasses the entire United States tropical empire, which overtook the Western Hemisphere, spanning both Roosevelt presidencies. The term was popularized through this writing and portrayed the United States as a police force sent to reconcile warring tropical countries, lawless societies, and corrupt politicians, essentially establishing U.S. reign over tropical trade.

== Origins ==
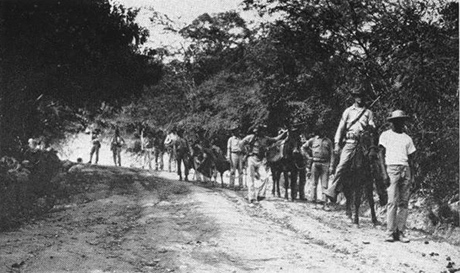
United States Marines with a Haitian guide patrolling the jungle in 1915 during the Battle of Fort Dipitie

Most prominently, the U.S. was advancing economic, political, and military interests in order to maintain its sphere of influence and to secure the Panama Canal (which opened in 1914). The U.S. had recently built the Panama Canal in order to promote global trade and to project its naval power. U.S. companies, such as the United Fruit Company (UFC, now Chiquita) and Standard Fruit Company (now Dole plc), also had financial stakes in the production of bananas, tobacco, sugarcane, and other commodities throughout the Caribbean, Central America, and northern South America.

=== Economic origins ===
The U.S. justified its interventions in Latin America by stating they were necessary actions to protect its economic interest. The Panama Canal was used as a major justification of these interventions which America deemed essential for its trade and security over the Northern Hemisphere. With the 1901 Hay–Pauncefote Treaty, granting the U.S. control to build the Panama Canal, the U.S. felt the need to protect its economic goals and strategic objectives in the region which would later set the stage for the Banana Wars.

With financial stakes in many crops, the U.S. also felt compelled to protect these companies producing these goods. Major food companies like UFC, which was the major exporter of bananas to the U.S., needed the military's help in protecting its large plantations and railroads from potential threats. With the U.S. backing these companies, it allowed them to hold a large influence over the local governments. With an economic foothold in Latin America, the U.S. was able to assert control over the region and ensure its interests came first.

Nicaragua was the main center of unrest against U.S. companies' interest. Two main figures involved were Guatemala's ruler Manuel Estrada Cabrera, who ruthlessly modernized the economy with Indian slave labor, and Nicaragua's Liberal ruler, Jose Santos Zelaya. Both were forceful autocratic leaders and most importantly were mortal enemies. Cabrera managed to convince the U.S. representatives in Latin America that he was an enlightened progressive trying to bring Guatemala into the modern age like America. Zelaya was against picking favorites with other countries outside of Latin America; Zelaya would preach about how the Americans should not involve themselves with Latin American business and stick to their own country. Therefore, American opinion of Zelaya was much lower than that of Estrada.

The Americans in Latin America did not like how Zelaya was involved in the economy of Latin America as well as his way of meddling in other countries' affairs to get what he felt was best. Zelaya's distaste of the Americans was exacerbated when the canal was built in Panama rather than Nicaragua.

== Combat history ==
=== Interventions ===
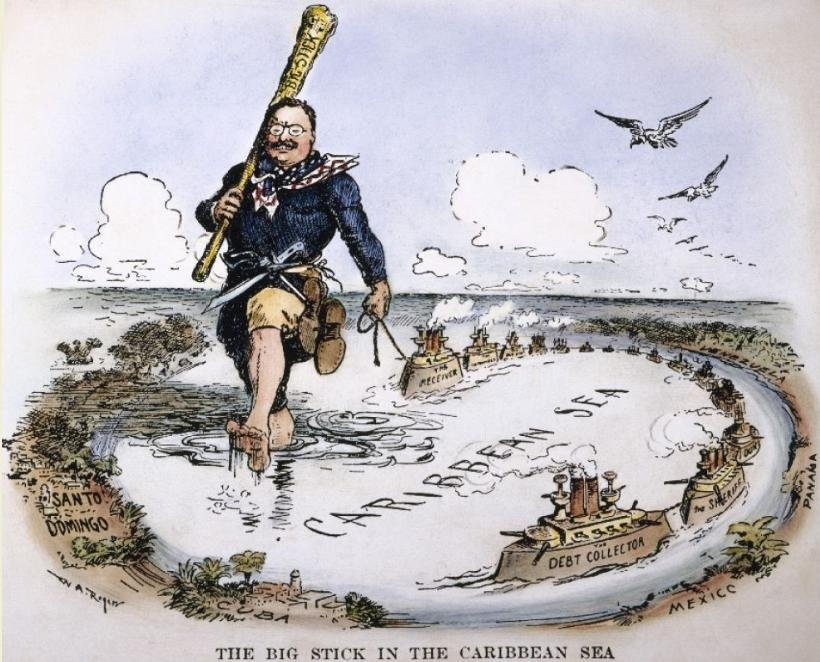
William Allen Rogers cartoon depicting Theodore Roosevelt's Big Stick ideology

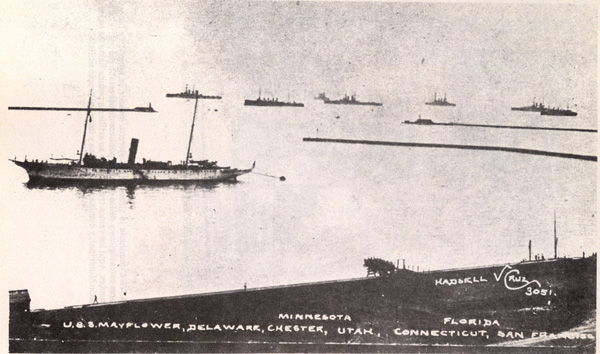
American warships off Veracruz in 1914

- Panama/Colombia: US interventions in the Isthmus of Panama go back to the 1846 Mallarino–Bidlack Treaty and intensified after the so-called Watermelon Riot of 1856. In 1885, US military intervention gained a mandate with the construction of the canal. The construction effort collapsed in bankruptcy, mismanagement, and disease in 1889, but resumed in the 20th century. In 1903, Panama seceded from the Republic of Colombia, backed by the US government, (Note: In December 1903, President Roosevelt put the number of "revolutions, rebellions, insurrections, riots, and other outbreaks" in Panama at 53 in the space of 57 years.) during the Thousand Days' War. The Hay–Pauncefote Treaty allowed the US to construct and control the canal. In 1903, the United States established sovereignty over the Panama Canal Zone.
- Spanish–American War: In 1898, Spain relinquished control of Cuba and ceded Puerto Rico to the US. The end of the Spanish–American War led to the start of the Banana Wars.
- Cuba: In December 1899, U.S. President William McKinley declared Leonard Wood, a US Army general, to have supreme power in Cuba. The U.S. took control of Cuba from Spain. It was occupied by the U.S. from 1898 to 1902 under Wood as its military governor, and again from 1906 to 1909, in 1912, and from 1917 to 1922, subject to the terms of the Cuban–American Treaty of Relations (1903) until 1934. In 1903, the U.S. took a permanent lease on the Guantanamo Bay Naval Base.

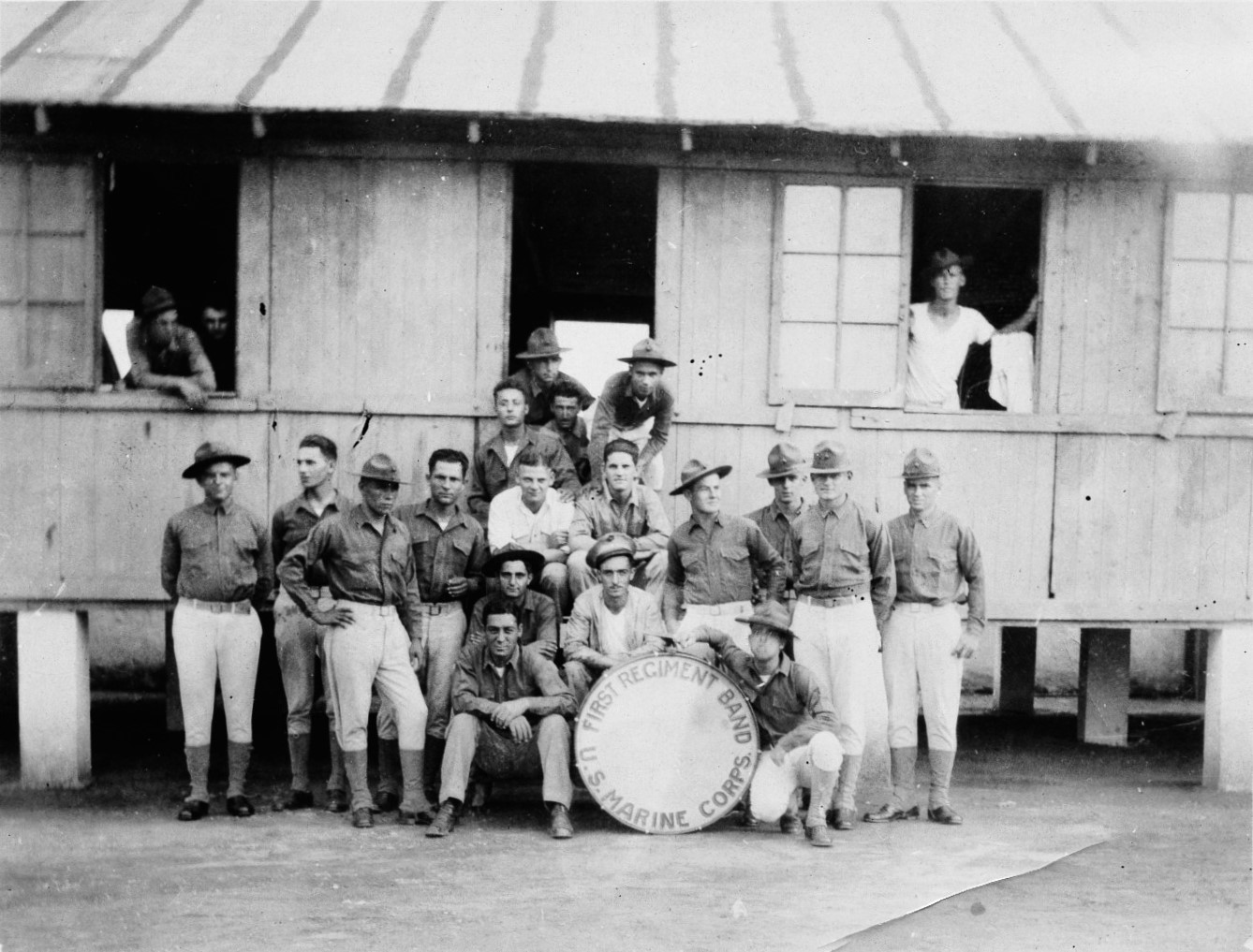
U.S. Marine Corps stationed in Santo Domingo, Dominican Republic, 1922

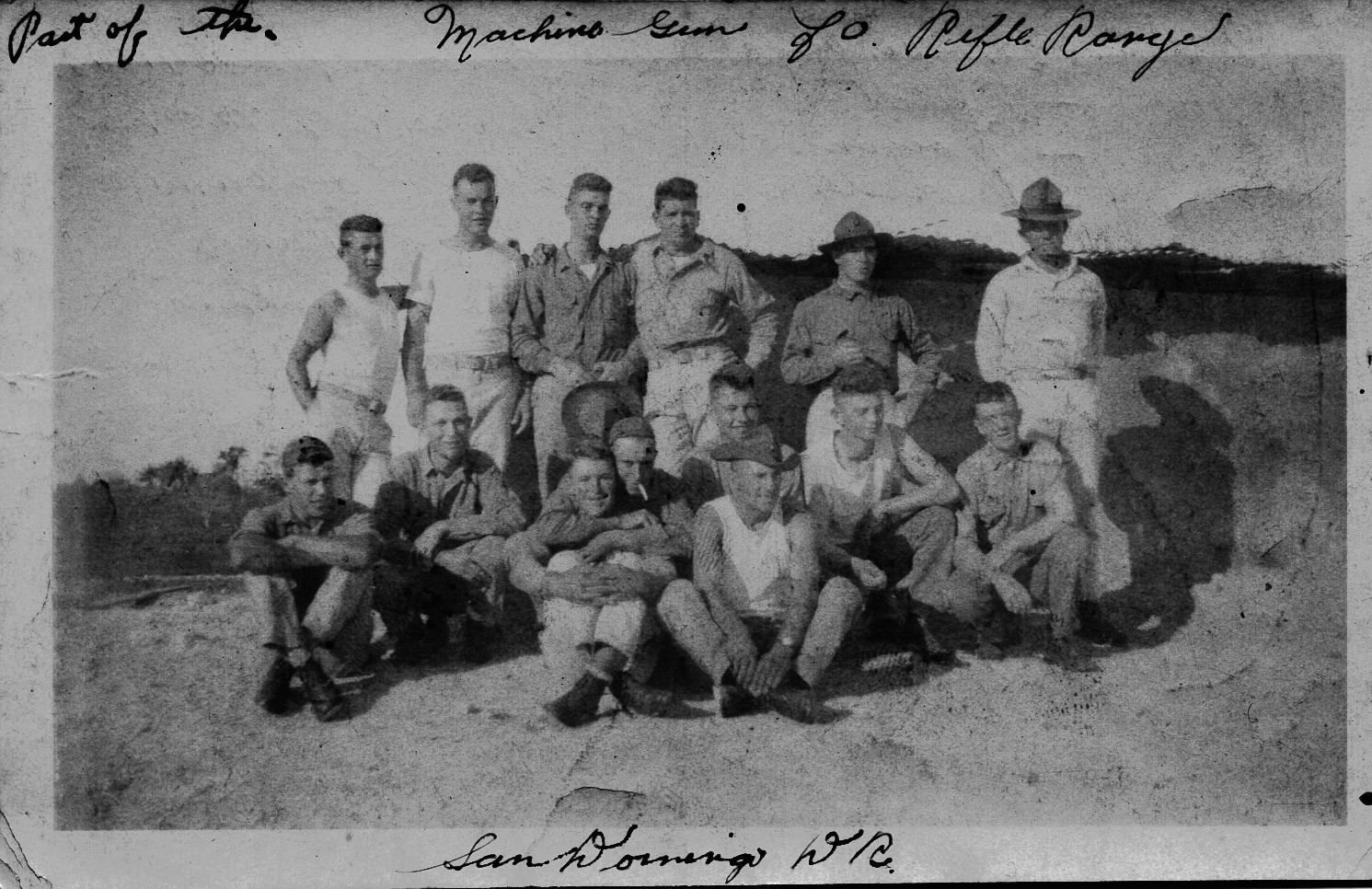
Marine machine gun unit in Santo Domingo, Dominican Republic, 1922

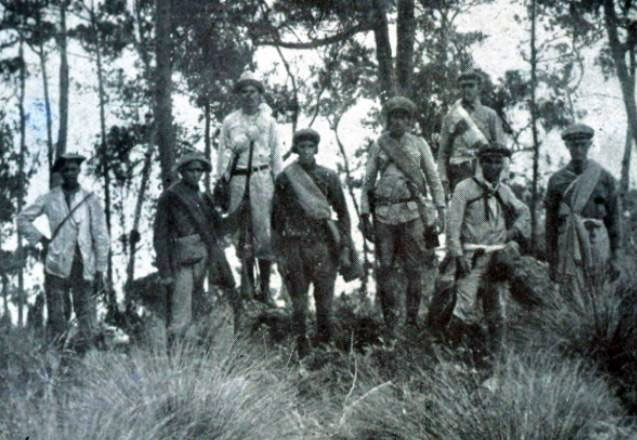
A group of peasant guerillas, known as gavilleros, who fought against the U.S. Marine occupation of the Dominican Republic

- Dominican Republic: Action in 1903, 1904 (the Santo Domingo Affair), and 1914 (U.S. Naval forces engaged in battles in Santo Domingo); occupied by the U.S. from 1916 to 1924. When a rebellion damaged an American-owned sugar cane plantation, U.S. Marines were sent in, starting on May 5, 1916. They took over a small castle called Fort Ozama, killed the men inside and set up a military presence to protect their business interests. Dominican forces, who had no machine guns or modern artillery, tried to take on the Marines in three conventional battles between June 1 and July 3, 1916, but were defeated. The battles resulted in 7 Marines killed and 15 wounded, while the Dominican forces suffered 100–300 casualties. Guerrilla resistance was concentrated in the eastern provinces of El Seibo and San Pedro de Macorís, where an estimated 600 fighters led by a dozen caudillos operated. On August 13, 1918, Dominican guerrillas ambushed a five-man Marine patrol, killing four Marines and wounding the survivor. During the occupation, 144 Marines were killed in action and 50 were wounded. The Dominicans suffered 950 casualties.
- Nicaragua: Occupied by the U.S. almost continuously from 1912 to 1933, after intermittent landings and naval bombardments in the prior decades. The U.S. had troops in Nicaragua to prevent its leaders from creating conflicts with U.S. interests in the country. In 1912 General Luis Mena led a rebellion against the U.S. -backed leader Adolfo Diaz. This led to a U.S. intervention to reinstate the president and protect American business interest and ideals. U.S. Presidents William Howard Taft and Calvin Coolidge protested to the Nicaraguan government stating that their purpose for invading was to come to an agreement of a treaty or start processing one. The bluejackets and Marines were there for about 15 years. The U.S. claimed it wanted Nicaragua to elect "good men" who would not threaten to disrupt U.S. interests. During the occupation, 47 Marines were killed in action or died from wounds, 41 died in accidents (including aircraft crashes), and 24 died from disease or other causes; 66 were wounded. The campaign cost the United States about $20 million. The Guardia Nacional reported 48 killed and 109 wounded. Rebel losses were estimated at 1,115 killed, 526 wounded, and 76 captured.

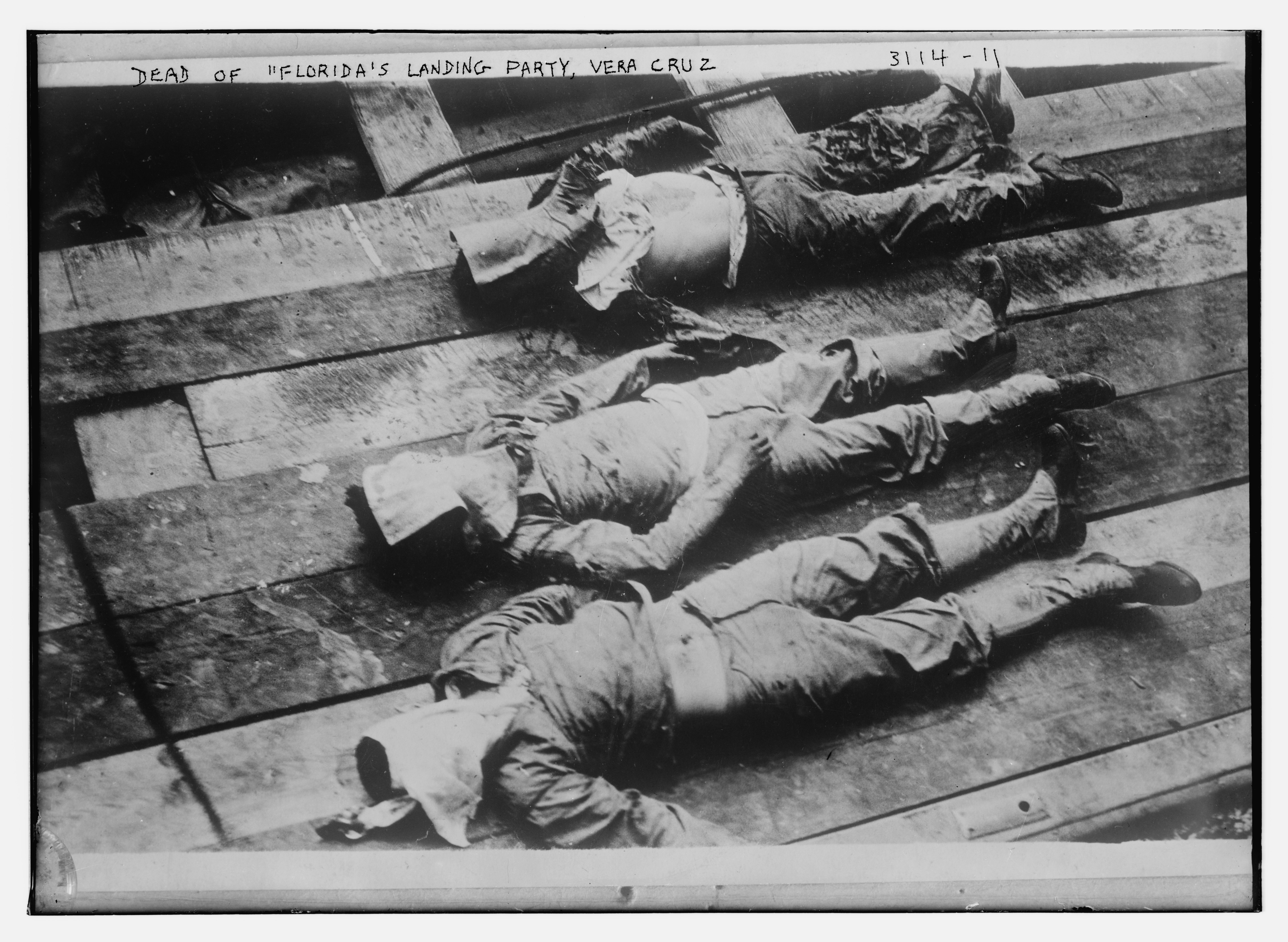
The corpses of three U.S. sailors who were part of the U.S. landing party during the 1914 occupation of the Mexican port city of Veracruz

- Mexico: U.S. military involvements with Mexico in this period had the same general commercial and political causes but stand as a special case. The Americans conducted the Border War with Mexico from 1910 to 1919 for additional reasons: to control the flow of immigrants and refugees from revolutionary Mexico (pacificos), and to counter rebel raids into U.S. territory. The 1914 U.S. occupation of Veracruz, however, was an exercise of armed influence; not an issue of border integrity; it was aimed at cutting off the supplies of German munitions to the government of Mexican leader Victoriano Huerta, which U.S. President Woodrow Wilson refused to recognize. In the years prior to World War I, the US was also alert to the regional balance of power against Germany. The Germans were actively arming and advising the Mexicans, as shown by the 1914 SS Ypiranga arms-shipping incident, German saboteur Lothar Witzke's base in Mexico City, the 1917 Zimmermann telegram, and the German advisors present during the 1918 Battle of Ambos Nogales. Only twice during the Mexican Revolution did the U.S. military occupy Mexico: during the temporary occupation of Veracruz and between 1916 and 1917, when U.S. General John Pershing led U.S. Army forces on a nationwide search for Pancho Villa.
- Haiti: Occupied by the U.S. from 1915 to 1934, which led to the creation of a new Haitian constitution in 1917 that instituted changes that included an end to the prior ban on land ownership by non-Haitians. This period included the First and Second Caco Wars.
- Honduras: The UFC and Standard Fruit Company dominated the country's key banana export sector and associated land holdings and railways, leading to the insertion of American troops in 1903, 1907, 1911, 1912, 1919, 1924, and 1925. Writer O. Henry coined the term "banana republic" in 1904 to describe Honduras.

Other Latin American nations were influenced or dominated by American economic policies and/or commercial interests to the point of coercion. Theodore Roosevelt declared the Roosevelt Corollary to the Monroe Doctrine in 1904, asserting the right of the United States to intervene to stabilize the economic affairs of states in the Caribbean and Central America if they were unable to pay their international debts. From 1909 to 1913, Taft and Secretary of State Philander C. Knox asserted a more "peaceful and economic" Dollar diplomacy foreign policy, although that too was backed by force, as in Nicaragua.

== American Fruit Companies ==
The first decades of the history of Honduras are marked by instability in terms of politics and economy. Indeed, three armed conflicts occurred between independence and the rise to power of the Carias government. This instability was partly caused by American involvement in the country. One of the first companies that concluded an agreement with the Honduran government was the Vaccaro Brothers Company (Standard Fruit Company). The Cuyamel Fruit Company then followed their lead. UFC also contracted with the government through its subsidiaries, Tela Railroad Company and Truxillo Rail Road Company. Contracts between the Honduran government and the American companies most often involved exclusive rights to a piece of land in exchange for building railroads in Honduras.

However, banana producers in Central America (including Honduras) "were scourged by Panama disease, a soil-borne fungus...that decimated production over large regions". Typically, companies would abandon the decimated plantations and destroy the railroads and other utilities that they had used along with the plantation, so the exchange of services between the government and the companies was not always respected.

The ultimate goal of the contracts for the companies was control of the banana trade from production to distribution. The companies would finance guerrilla fighters, presidential campaigns and governments. According to Rivera and Carranza, the indirect participation of American companies in the country's armed conflicts worsened the situation. The presence of more dangerous and modern weapons allowed more dangerous warfare among the factions.

In British Honduras (now Belize), the situation was significantly different. Although UFC was the sole exporter of bananas there, and the company attempted to manipulate the local government, the country did not suffer the instability and armed conflicts that its neighbors experienced.

== United Fruit Company ==
The most influential figure outside of the U.S. government in Latin America during this time was UFC. UFC's president Samuel Zemurray, known as the Banana Man, used the United States military to exercise his influence over Latin America for his own economic gain. UFC held large amounts of land, railroads, and ports across Latin America which allowed them to essentially rule over these nations. By owning railroads across the continent, UFC was able to lower transportation costs and have an advantage over the other fruit companies. Zemurray followed a business strategy called vertical integration, which allowed him to control every aspect of the supply chain allowing them to maximize profits. UFC and Zemurray left a lasting legacy on Latin America by using political influence as a business in order to achieve the business interests.

In Honduras, Zemurray provided insurgents with weapons and a former U.S. Navy vessel, resulting in a 1911 coup ousting Miguel R. Dávila, who had implemented laws that hurt his profits. Following the coup, former President Manuel Bonilla was reinstated as president. Bonilla allowed Zemurray to run his company as he pleased and set him in charge of the country's finances.

== Smedley Butler ==
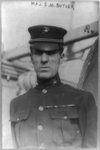
Major Smedley D. Butler in a USMC uniform

Perhaps the single most active military officer in the Banana Wars was U.S. Marine Corps Major General Smedley Butler, nicknamed "Maverick Marine", who saw action in Honduras in 1903, served in Nicaragua enforcing American policy from 1909 to 1912, was awarded the Medal of Honor for his role in Veracruz in 1914, and received a second Medal of Honor for bravery in Haiti in 1915. After his forced retirement for making reckless statements, Butler made a career of speaking to left-wing groups denouncing capitalism. His standard speech after 1933 was titled War is a Racket, where he denounced the role he had played, describing himself as "a high class muscle man for Big Business, for Wall Street and the bankers...a racketeer, a gangster for capitalism".

== See also ==
- Foreign interventions by the United States
- American imperialism
- United States involvement in regime change in Latin America
- United States involvement in regime change
- United States color-coded war plans
- First Honduran civil war
- Second Honduran civil war
- List of United States invasions of Latin American countries
