= United States occupation of Cuba =

The United States occupation of Cuba may refer to:

- the Military Government of Cuba (1898–1902)
- the Provisional Government of Cuba (1906–1909)
- the Sugar Intervention (1917–1922), a third occupation of Cuba
