= Francisco Bueso =

President of Honduras (1860-?)

Doctor Francisco Bueso Cuéllar (born 1860) was acting president of Honduras for less than two months, from 10 March to 27 April 1924.

He served as vice president of Honduras in the cabinet of General Rafael López Gutiérrez. When López Gutiérrez died while in office, Bueso succeeded him. However, Bueso, in turn, was driven from the capital by rebels led by General Tiburcio Carías Andino, who took charge of the country as first chief of the Liberating Revolution. By 31 March, the United States had sent 176 officers and men from the cruiser USS Milwaukee to land at Amapala to quell the disturbance.

Preceded by Rafael López Gutiérrez (acting)	President of Honduras; 1924–1924	Succeeded by Tiburcio Carías Andino
