= Honduras in World War I =

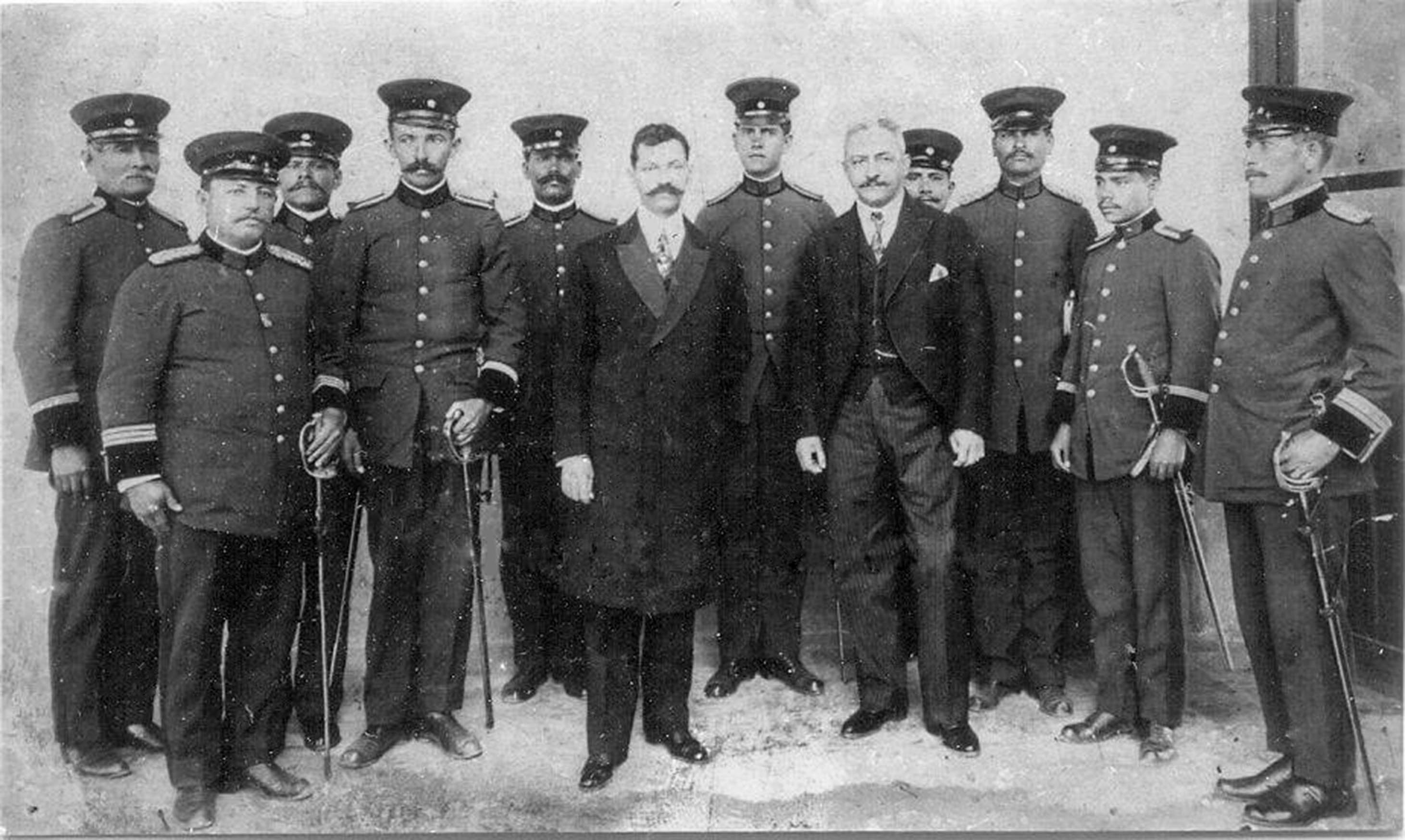
President Francisco Bertrand and his military men, he was the head of state of Honduras during the great war during his second period that started in 1913 and ended in 1919.

The republic of Honduras was a neutral nation in the conflict until 1918, from then on it had a discreet participation in the First World War, given its position as a small Central American nation with little international influence in that period. However, his diplomatic role and political decisions were not irrelevant in the Central American sphere. Although Honduras' participation in the Great war was symbolic and did not involve direct military actions, there were some positive consequences and changes that influenced its subsequent development.

== Historical context ==
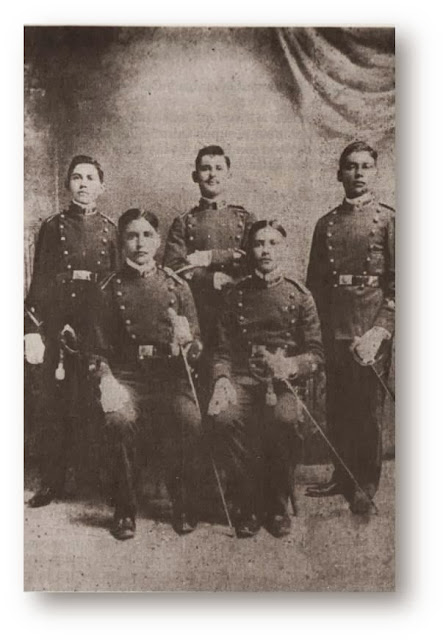
Honduran cadets, at the beginning of the 20th century, most military uniforms were heavily influenced by the French style.

In 1914, Honduras was going through a difficult time, despite the technological advances worldwide, it was still a largely agricultural nation, the country was going through a time of political instability and with an economy strongly influenced by foreign interests, especially American ones, and a foreign debt that was limiting the country's development progress. However, the country already had a considerable railway network that, due to the banana enclaves, developed to levels never seen before. In addition, Honduras lived in a social stability because the level of crime in the country was almost non-existent.

Although years ago in the liberal reform attempts were made to open more diplomatic relations with other nations and informal economic relations were maintained with other powers by the beginning of the 20th century, Honduras's international relations were focused mainly to its Central American neighbors and the United States. When the war broke out in Europe on July 28, the news reached Tegucigalpa through intermediaries, generally by representatives of the powers in conflict and their press releases written in their capitals. These were assimilated according to the preference of those who ran the printed media, among them Paulino Valladares (El Cronista) and Froylán Turcios (Nuevo Tiempo). The chronicler accused his opponents of being "Frenchified," while the New Times accused the supporters of the German Empire of being "Germanophiles."

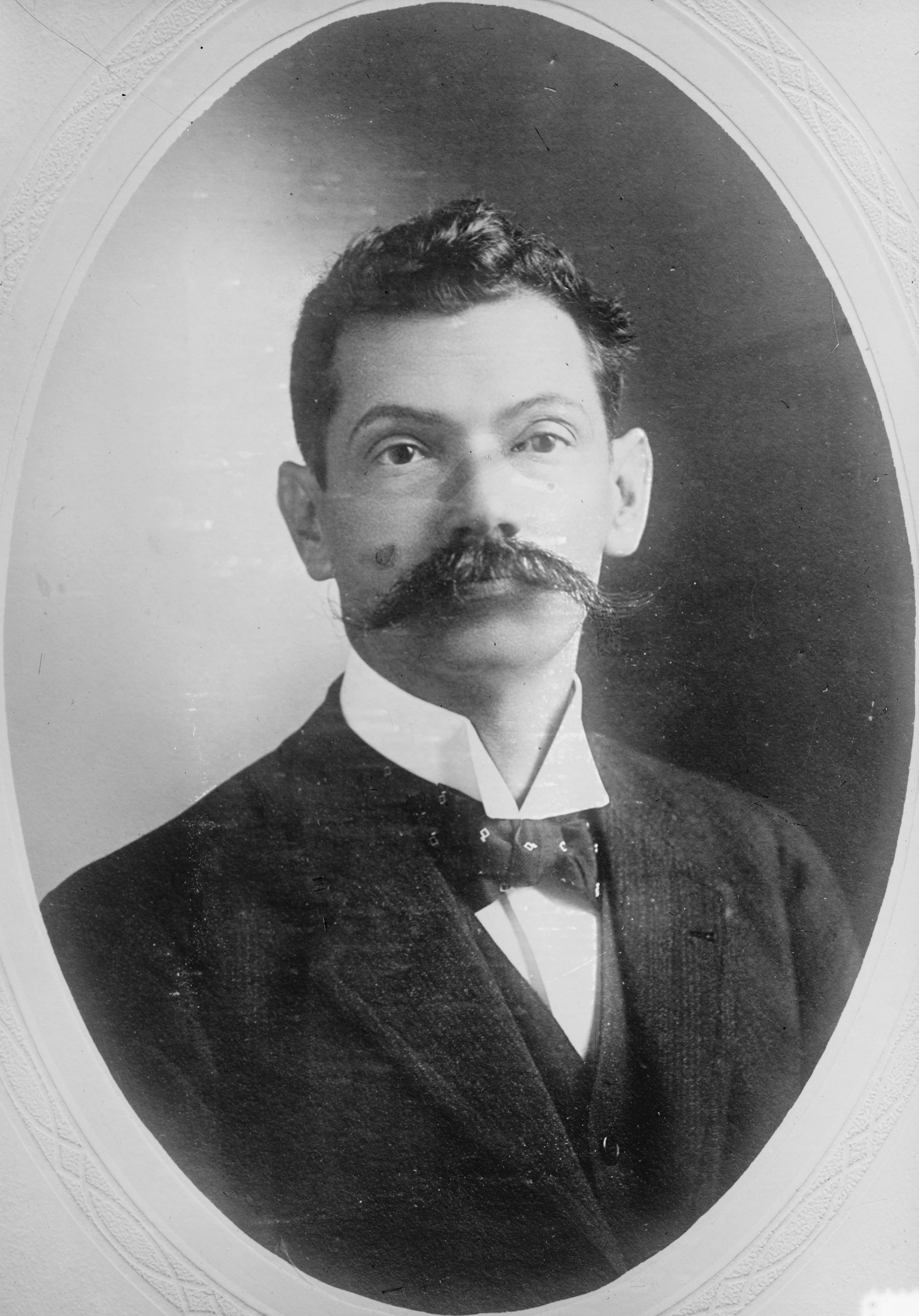
The United States consulate was concerned about the president's approach to German capital and that could lead the country to be a possible German ally in Latin America, in addition to displacing them as the dominant power in Honduras.

Because it was perceived as a mainly European conflict and seeing that Honduras did not have any considerable weight in international diplomacy, the government of Honduras under the presidency of Dr. Franciscro Bertrand decided not to get involved in these matters. According to Honduran historians, there are reports from the US consulate pointing out President Bertrand's friendships with German businessmen, a situation that changed under pressure from Washington when it interceded in the war with the purpose of protecting its interests and containing the Central Powers in Europe.

== Formal declaration of War ==
In May 1917, reports that a Standard Fruit Company banana boat had been shelled and sunk by a German gunboat on the milk run between La Ceiba and New Orleans,this would cause President Bertrand to close the German consulates in Honduras including those in Puerto Cortes, La Ceiba, and Trujillo, and expelled their German diplomats. Honduras was put under martial law, and people wishing to travel within the country's borders had to do so using an internal passport. Honduras formally entered World War I on July 19, 1918, declaring war on the German Empire. This decision, although late, responded mainly to political and diplomatic pressure, rather than to direct military reasons, as mentioned previously.

== Migration ==
During these years Palestinian migration in Honduras intensified because the Ottoman Empire was part of the Central Powers. Palestinian men were forced to serve in the Ottoman army. In addition, there was repression against those who opposed the Ottoman regime or were seen as sympathizers of foreign powers and the era created an economic decline that caused many Palestinian families to flee the empire to Honduras. Palestinians used to disembark in Puerto Cortés, which to this day is the main Honduran port. From there, they moved to cities such as San Pedro Sula, Tegucigalpa and La Ceiba.

== Aftermath ==
After the war, Honduras maintained its pro-American position in the international system, but the direct benefits to the country were limited however it began to integrate more into the international system, participating in forums such as the League of Nations (although it did not become a formal member). The image of the country was improved at the local level and closer ties with the other allied powers, mainly the United Kingdom and France. This facilitated access to financial credits, foreign investments and the partial modernization of agricultural and industrial sectors. In addition, by supporting the allies, Honduras had a favorable position for trade in the international market after the war. Banana and coffee exports gained importance, and trade routes to North America and Europe were strengthened.

Although Honduras already had a modern army, the world conflict encouraged its leaders to lay the foundations for a more formal and extensive military structure on a larger scale than was the case in the liberal reform. They would also begin to build more railways and highways at the national level, especially due to the need to modernize given the progress that was shown to the world at that time.

== See also ==
- History of Honduras
- First Honduran Civil War
