= Rafael López Gutiérrez =

President of Honduras (1855–1924)

Rafael Salvador López Gutiérrez
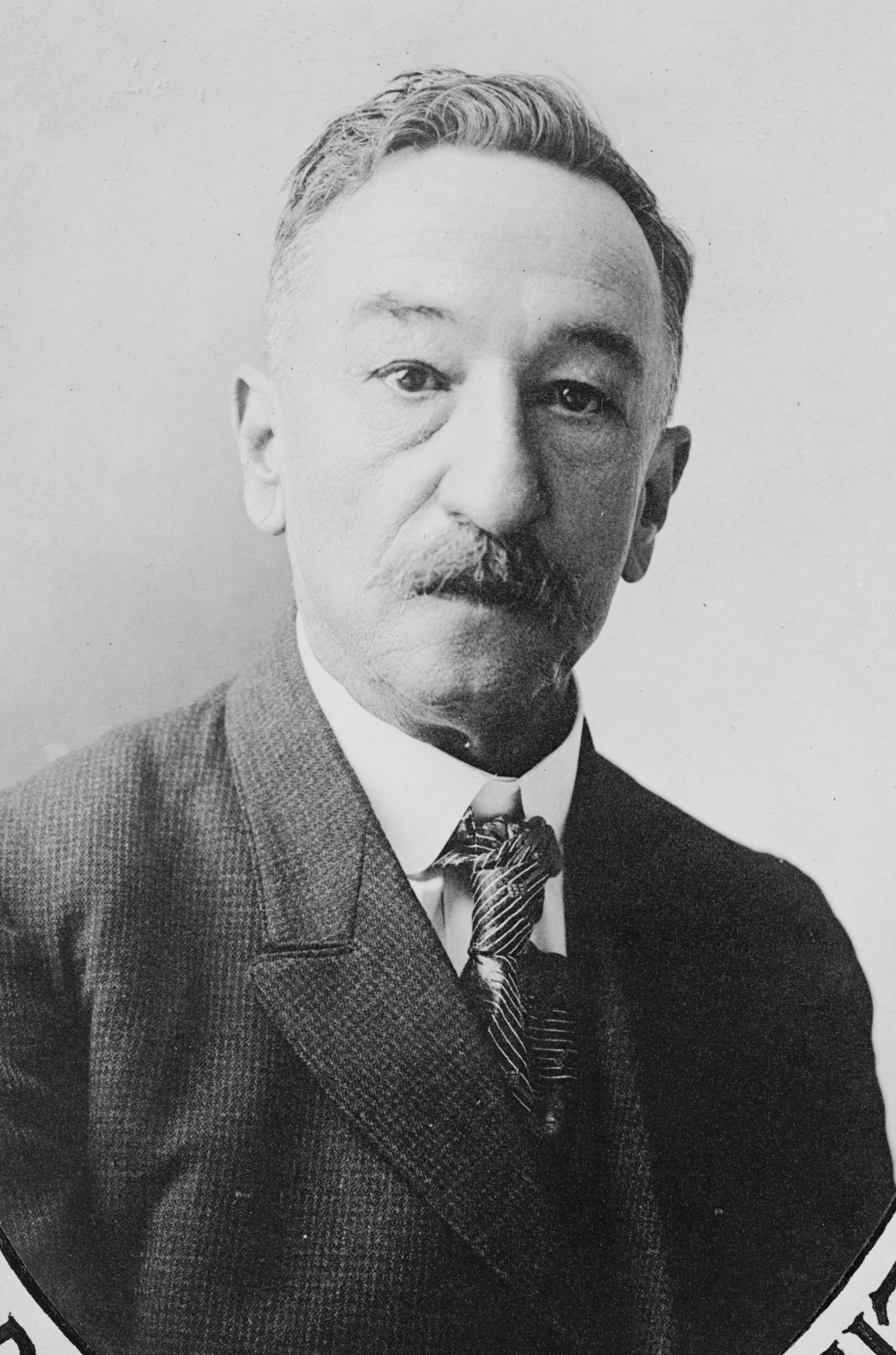
- Rafael López Gutiérrez, 1921

President of Honduras
- In office 1 February 1920 – 10 March 1924
- Vice President: José María Ochoa; Francisco Bueso
- Preceded by: Francisco Bográn
- Succeeded by: Francisco Bueso

Personal details
- Born: 11 May 1854 Tegucigalpa, Honduras
- Died: 10 March 1924 (aged 69) Amapala, Honduras
- Party: Liberal Party of Honduras
- Spouse: Ana Lagos Lanez
- Profession: Politician, military

General Rafael Salvador López Gutiérrez (11 May 1854 – 10 March 1924) was President of Honduras from 1 February 1920 to 10 March 1924. A former general in the Honduran Army, Gutierrez attempted to extend his term in office past its designated end, and was forced from office. He died in Amapala on 10 March, suffering from diabetes, after a failed attempt to escape to the United States for insulin treatment.

== Life ==
Lopez-Gutiérrez was born to Soledad Gutiérrez Lozano and Juan López Gutiérrez on 11 May 1854 in the Honduran capital of Tegucigalpa. His family was very influential for example his father was the provisional President of Honduras in 1855. His early studies were in Tegucigalpa, but for the study of law, he was sent to London, where his mother's brother, Carlos Gutiérrez Lozano, was the Honduran ambassador to England. However, Lopez-Gutiérrez did not complete his studies there and returned to a political career in Honduras. In 1870 he married Anita Lagos Laínez, from an influential family in Choluteca, with significant mining interests.

Among the posts that he held were Director of the National Mint, Mayor of Tegucigalpa, customs administrator of Puerto Cortés, Minister of War (twice) and Vice-President of Honduras.

In 1886 Lopez-Gutiérrez joined the Honduran military, and by 1908 had risen to its highest rank, that of a division General.

In 1919 Lopez-Gutiérrez was serving as the civilian governor of the Tegucigalpa department, as well as head of the armed forces of that department. That year he was nominated by the Liberal Party of Honduras as their candidate for president. In the election of April 1919 the out-going president's choice, and brother-in-law, Nazario Soriano of the National Party of Honduras, was declared the winner in what many regarded as a fixed election. Lopez-Gutiérrez and others took up arms contesting that election which resulted in the First Honduran Civil War. Following which Lopez-Gutiérrez won the presidency in another rigged election.

== Notes and references ==
Political offices
Preceded by Francisco Bográn; Acting	President of Honduras; 1920–1924	Succeeded by Francisco Bueso; Acting
