= First Honduran Civil War =

1919 overthrow of the government

- Part of the Banana Wars
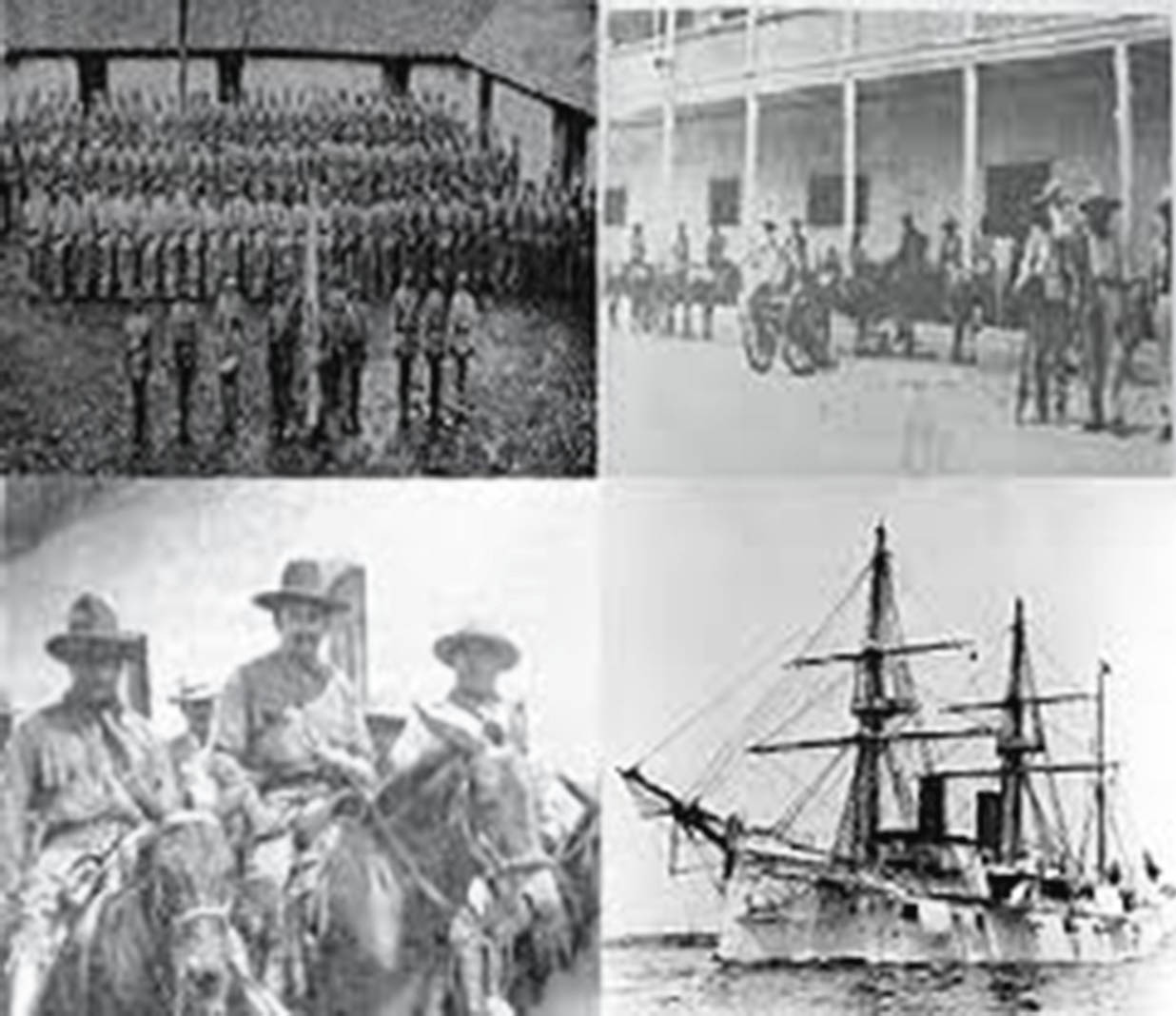
- Left to right: Honduran army · Soldiers in San Pedro Sula · Calvary of Colonel Ferrera · American cargo ship in Amapala
Date	23 July 1919 – 17 September 1919 (1 month, 3 weeks and 4 days)
Location	Honduras
Result	Victory of the United Rebel Army and overthrow of President Francisco Bertrand.

Belligerents
(Honduras) Honduran Army	(Honduras) United Rebel Army

Commanders and leaders
(Honduras) Juan Pablo Urrutia (Honduras) Tiburcio Carías Andino (Honduras) Eulogio Flores	(Honduras) Rafael López Gutiérrez

Casualties and losses
2,000	1,000

The First Honduran Civil War (Spanish: Primera guerra civil hondureña) or the Revolution of 19 (Spanish: Revolución del 19) was an armed conflict that took place in the Republic of Honduras in 1919. This was the first conflict in Honduran soil where the weapons and technological advances of the 20th century were felt.

== Background ==
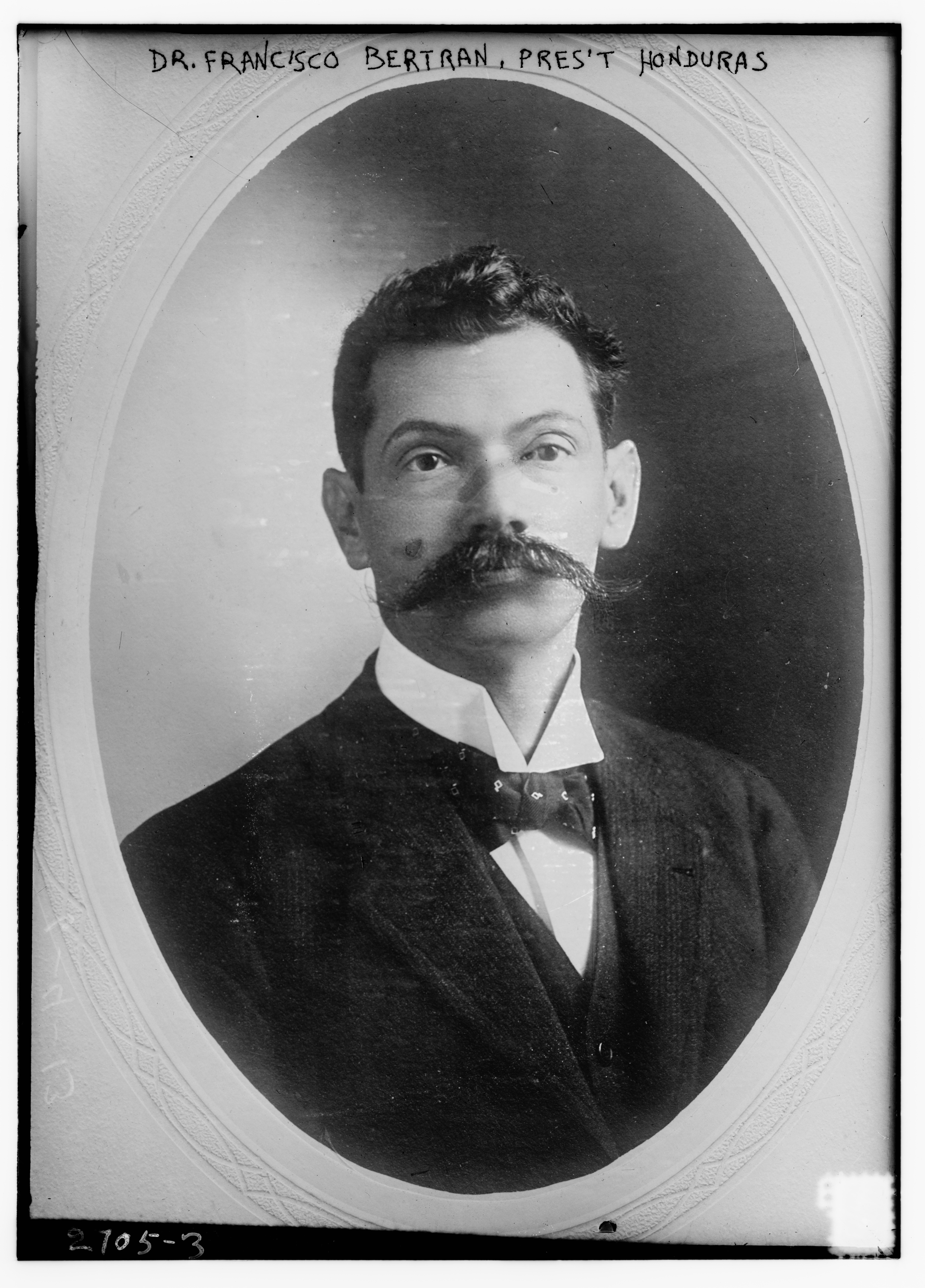
Dr. Francisco Bertrand. Honduran president at the time, the desire to put his brother-in-law in the presidency caused a war to take place in the country.

In 1919, Dr. Francisco Bertrand Barahona was at the end of his presidential term, who in an attempt to place his brother-in-law Dr. Nazario Soriano in the presidency, the political opponents rebelled against him, in the month of March, Since due to the rise of the American transnational companies that had operated in the country since the 19th century, the Honduran president had to be a weak figure and manageable at will. In this sense, that it would not harm them with the creation of a union of workers of such companies, that they did not enact laws that favored the same employees, that they did not increase their operating taxes, nor the prohibition on acquiring the land they wanted and much less than the national currency "El Lempira" officially decreed its creation and circulation since 1912 and 1919; whose idea had not been fully realized, due to the rotation of the US dollar that was handled in Honduran ports. President Bertrand's claim went so far that he indicated that accusations had been leveled against the American businessman Samuel Zemurray of provoking revolution.

In April the general elections were held and Nazario Soriano was the winner by the National Party of Honduras, unknown to the entire population, since Soriano was Honduran, but had always resided abroad due to his appointment as consul of Honduras in the city of New Orleans, United States of America. The detractors took up arms against the government and the alleged rigged succession, where Bertrand's sponsored was the only candidate with options.

Among the presidential candidates were: Colonel and lawyer Jerónimo J. Reina Minister of War, Francisco J. Mejía, Alberto de Jesús Membreño Vásquez who was the official candidate of the National Party of Honduras who was arrested and taken to Guatemala supposedly to protect his life and the politician and general Rafael Salvador López Gutiérrez candidate of the Liberal Party of Honduras. Then in July, Bertrand suspends the guarantees of the civil rights of citizens, all in order that there are no elections and impose his successor, this was the trigger for the civil war.

In July, Antonio López Gutiérrez, brother of General López Gutiérrez and Minister of Honduras in Washington, D.C. secretly requested the State Department to take steps to ensure free elections in Honduras.

Among the leaders of the rebellion were the Intibucan officers Vicente Tosta Carrasco, who was Mayor of the Plaza de Intibucá and when Bertrand declared himself dictator, Tosta was deposed and imprisoned for being a political opponent, then released by his allies and promoted to colonel. He was joined by his compadre and countryman Colonel Gregorio Ferrera and J. Ernesto Alvarado, among other officers who swore to remove Bertrand from power and join General Rafael López Gutiérrez, who had sought collaboration with the Liberals of Guatemala and the Conservatives of Guatemala. Nicaragua also had the approval of the richest man in Honduras, at that time Don Santos Soto Rosales, who granted his residence for the meetings of the rebel group among whom were the citizens Manuel Adalid and Gamero, Jesús M. Alvarado, Vicente Mejía Colindres, Carlos Lagos and Marcial Lagos, as well as renowned liberals, including: Raúl Toledo López, López Gutiérrez's nephew, the Licenciado Antonio R. Reina, Abel Gamero graduated from the United States Military Academy and who had been given the designation of Political Agent of the Revolution in Nicaragua, and supplier of arms, ammunition and supplies for the rebel army.

== Movements ==
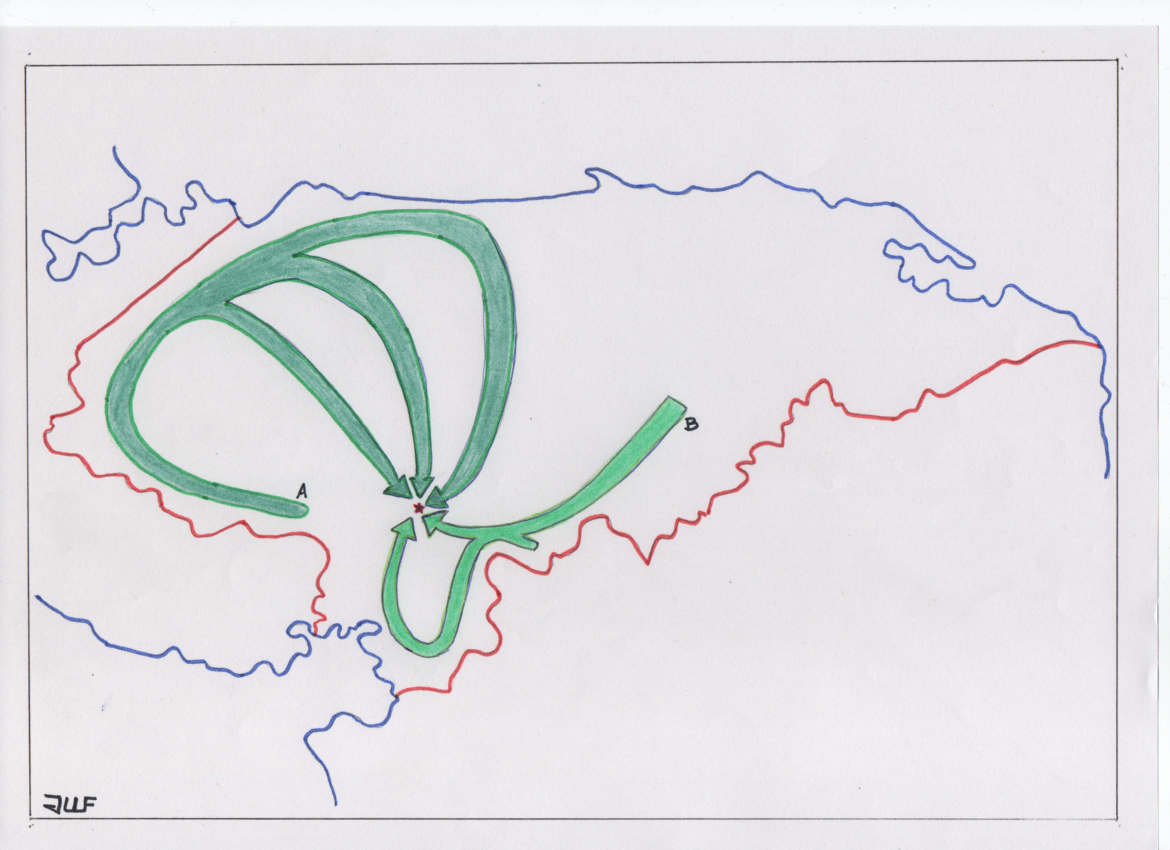
Plan of the First Honduran Civil War of 1919. A) Rebel Army of the West. B) Rebel Army of the East.* City of Tegucigalpa.

On July 24, the Government of Bertrand requests a loan from the “Junta de Aguas” Note 7 of the city of Santa Rosa de Copán in the amount of 1,000 Honduran pesos for military expenses. He also seeks support with the ruler of El Salvador.

July 23, the United States representative in Tegucigalpa informed the Ministry of Foreign Affairs of Honduras that the following: Francisco López Padilla, José Jorge Callejas, Paulino Valladares, Rómulo E. Durón, Saturnino Medal and Silverio Laínez requested political asylum, in the same way Joseph Walter, consul of Great Britain, informed his American counterpart that Messrs. Magín Herrera, Vicente Mejía Colindres and Venancio Callejas were at their headquarters as asylees, while the conflict was requested.

On July 25, the western rebel army takes the municipalities of La Esperanza and Intibucá, commanded by General José Ramírez who died in the revolt, his officers Colonel Vicente Tosta Carrasco and Gregorio Ferrera, received orders to advance to the cities of Gracias, Santa Rosa and then head north. The first plaza to fall was that of Gracias (Lempira) which was under the command of General José León Castro.

July 29, the Plaza de Cedros, Francisco Morazán under the command of Major José Innocente Triminio Osorio Sectional Commander of Cedros, is attacked by the revolutionary forces that take it, previously under a crossfire skirmish.

=== Fighting in central Honduras ===
Meanwhile, the rebel column commanded by General Rafael Salvador López Gutiérrez would try to take the center of the country and the capital, López Gutiérrez fought and defeated the government forces under the command of General Eulogio Flores stationed in the town of "Teupasenti" and then advanced until you take the vicinity of "El Pedregalito".

==== Take from the west ====
Generals José María Reina, Ernesto Alvarado and Colonels Vicente Tosta Carrasco, Flavio Delcid and Gregorio Ferrera and Captain Natividad Pérez, leaders of the "Revolutionary Army of the West" began their war operations in western Honduras. On August 11, at 0500 hours, they attacked the city of Gracias then they left for Santa Rosa de Copán with a good army and others who have joined them, the rebels approached from the east and surrounded the city to besiege it, be spotted by the Santa Rosa government forces under the command of the lawyer Jesús María Rodríguez Commander of Arms of Santa Rosa and General Alfonso Ferrari who orders Colonel Vicente Ayala to reinforce the Constitutional City Council guard and to prepare both the soldiers and the citizens to The combat that has no place until Wednesday the 13th and ended on Saturday August 16, 1919. The defenders of the city are 400 well-equipped soldiers; after several hours of fighting the city was surrendered.

In this act, General Vicente Tosta Carrasco took 5,000 Honduran pesos from the same “Board of Waters” for the rebel campaign, then they went north.

=== Tegucigalpa ===
On 29 August, Government defensive positions stationed at "El Pedregalito" fell due to a strong advance by rebel forces.

=== Battle of San Pedro ===
Commander General José María Reina H, Colonel Vicente Tosta Carrasco, General Simón Aguilar (originally from Comayagüela), Colonel Gregorio Ferrera, joined by Doctor and General Ernesto Alvarado “Alvaradito” (originally from Trujillo), a military graduate from the academy of conservative orientation and who had left his farm in Pimienta, Cortés, to join the revolution on September 2 and 3, fought in the city of San Pedro Sula, which would also fall into his power and General José María Reina was wounded in the assault on the trenches of the government troops on the hill "La Cumbre" and where General Teófilo Cárcamo died; General Simón Aguilar stretched the arms of the revolution crushing the national combatants, the rebels headed towards the city from Puerto Cortés.

=== Battle of Danli ===
The "Revolutionary Army of the East" meets to attack the city of Danlí, in September, for this the officers in charge of the mission were: General Gregorio Aguilar, General Salvador Cisneros, General Adolfo Zúniga. His opponents would be a good army under the command of Colonel José María Díaz Gómez, surrounded by his officers: Innocente Triminio, Leonidas Pineda, Rosendo Fortín, José Alvarado, Félix Alemán, Enrique Varela, Mariano Godoy and Fernando Palomo. The rebel headquarters was established on the hill of "El Estiquirinero", the bulk of the army consisted of three columns which were strategically located, surrounding their objective. Colonel Mendoza would attack from the north; Colonel Cisneros to the south and Colonel Aguilar to the east. At 05:00 hours, the attack began on the government garrisons in different parts of Danlí, it was not yet dawn and a ration of bullets from the revolutionaries fell on the guards and they took refuge inside the barracks and in the nearby buildings, there they barricaded themselves and prepared to resist the tremendous attack. When the sun rose, the entire government army was inside the town, subjected to an intense attack from the enemy and unable to organize an effective defense. Several groups of rebel suicide soldiers approached the doors of the buildings, under enemy fire, with axes, picks and other tools in order to break down the doors and penetrate inside the defensive positions, when they did so they fired incessantly at the inside. At the end of the day a lot of dead, wounded and others awaited them, all the prisoners were disarmed and they were given freedom once they had stopped fighting for the dictator.

On September 9, 1919, Dr. Bertrand Barahona resigned the executive command in the Council of Ministers and together with Dr. Nazario Soriano, Froilán Turcios, Andrés Soriano and other friends and supporters, he went to San Lorenzo, in two cars that carried the front covered with the flag of the United States of America, so as not to be arrested, from there they left for the United States. the council by the Minister of Government Salvador Aguirre who was in command of the administration until September 16, when it was taken over by Doctor Vicente Mejía Colindres, who served as Minister of Foreign Affairs, until October 5. After the resignation of President Bertrand, and a few days before the entry into Tegucigalpa of General López Gutiérrez's troops, his brother, Antonio López Gutiérrez, wrote to the Latin American Division of the State Department: "... it is necessary that a strong and central government is created. We wish the State Department to give us its moral support to this end. "

The National Congress of Honduras ordered to place in the provisional presidency Doctor Francisco Bográn Barahona, who took office on October 5 and summoned the people to hold general elections.

Woodrow Wilson, president of the United States of America, sent the USS “San José” to Amapala on the southern coasts of Honduras, so that with dialogue, the war could be ended and democracy returned. Likewise, the Salvadoran insurgents acting under the orders of the rebels were captured.

== Military tactics ==
- The rebel army used the night and in the dark they attacked the government barracks and buildings.
- The attacks were fast and massive.
- The machine gun was used.

== Post war ==
- After the civil war, General Rafael López Gutiérrez emerged as the presidential candidate of the Liberal Party of Honduras, who entered the city of Tegucigalpa in triumph on September 17 and in turn left the Doctor and General Tiburcio Carias Andino in part with the Pretensions to carry out a counter revolution by not accepting Gutiérrez, as a presidential candidate, against the formula of the National Democratic Party lawyer Alberto de Jesús Membreño and Antonio Madrid.
- Elections are held in October and General Rafael López Gutiérrez is victorious and Doctor José María Ochoa Velásquez is the victor, who took office on February 1, 1920.

== Consequences ==
- The Honduran Government made sure to maintain and train a better Honduran Armed Forces and create a loyal Air Force.
- Transnational companies (banana, mining) 12 took over most of the coastal land in northern Honduras.
- It caused poverty, malnutrition, poor wages, poor health care for employees.
- Creation of a union by the employees of the Transnationals.
- Foundation of the Communist Party of Honduras.
- Peace Treaty between the Central American countries.

== See also ==
- History of Honduras
