= Francisco Bográn =

Honduran politician

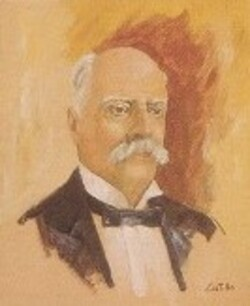
Francisco Bográn Barahona

Francisco Bográn Barahona (1852 – 7 December 1926) was acting President of Honduras from 5 October 1919 to 1 February 1920. He was the brother of previous president Luis Bográn. He was the President of National Congress of Honduras from 1919 to 1920.

Political offices
Preceded by Vicente Mejía Colindres; Acting	President of Honduras; 1919–1920	Succeeded by Rafael López Gutiérrez
