= Lester D. Langley =

Lester D. Langley (August 7, 1940 - January 22, 2025) was an American historian. He was a professor of history at Texas A&M, Central Washington University, and the University of Georgia.

== Books ==
- The Americas in the Age of Revolution, 1750-1850 (Yale University Press, 1996)
- America and the Americas: The United States in the Western Hemisphere (University of Georgia Press, 1989)
- The Banana Wars: An Inner History of American Empire, 1900–1934 (The University Press of Kentucky, 1983)
- The United States and the Caribbean, 1900–1970 (University of Georgia Press, 1980)
- Struggle for the American Mediterranean: United States-European Rivalry in the Gulf-Caribbean, 1776–1904 (University of Georgia Press, 1976)
- The Cuban Policy of the United States: A Brief History (Wiley, 1968)
