= Sugar Intervention =

US Marine Corps intervention in Cuba

The Sugar Intervention was a series of events in Cuba from August 25, 1917, to February 15, 1922, when the United States Marine Corps was stationed on the island in response to instability that threatened sugar production.

== Background ==
When conservative Cuban president Mario García Menocal was re-elected in November 1916, liberals began to question the circumstances surrounding his re-election. The controversy escalated into a military insurgency in the country, led by former president José Miguel Gómez and aided by Alfredo Zayas, Gerardo Machado, and his son Miguel Mariano Gómez. The left-wing forces were mostly acting in Eastern Cuba, however, and were insufficient to overthrow the government. On February 12, the USS Paducah (PG-18) landed soldiers on the island, following a request for protection from American sugarcane plantation owners.

By March 1917, the liberal forces in Western Cuba were mostly dispersed, and in the east they lost the Battle of Caicaje, after which many leaders of the liberal movement were captured, including Gomez and his command. The liberals also failed to gain the support of the US. Therefore, the liberals tried to abandon their cause and conclude peace agreements with the conservatives at the local level. Menocal offered amnesty to all rebels. Many liberal leaders had to emigrate.

On April 7, 1917, Cuba declared war on Germany, and many liberals, in support of the move, decided to stop criticizing the government. However, the crisis in the Liberal party resulted in the dramatic increase in banditry and local insurgency, since low-level military commanders were not in a position to negotiate with the government and had to remain in the field without any central command. Small units, which counted twenty to thirty men each, were particularly active in the eastern provinces, and the government did not have the capability to deal with them. At the same time, the social base of the insurgents broadened, as agriculture was concentrated to big latifundias and peasants were becoming bankrupt.

The US government decided that the insurgency represented a direct threat to American property in the country. In addition, the general mood of the insurgents was anti-American. The US was also afraid that Germany could support the insurgents. Though the Cuban government issued multiple statements that it was capable of taking the situation under control, nothing changed. On May 14, the US State Department proposed that troops should be transferred to Cuba, under orders to only be involved in protection of US property. This caused strong opposition from the Cuban government, and the US government reconsidered and delayed the intervention. In mid-May, Henry Morgan was sent as a special envoy to Cuba to study the situation. After becoming familiar with the situation, Morgan advised the government to dispatch the troops immediately to suppress the bandits, adding that the 1918 sugar harvest was in danger of being destroyed if intervention was delayed.

In July 1917, the Menocal government suspended habeas corpus, which meant that anyone could be detained for an indefinite period of time. Though the measure was claimed to be intended against German spies, in practice it started selective pro-government terror. In early summer of 1917, the Cuban government agreed to the arrival of American Marines. Even though both sides recognized that the liberal revolt was over, they needed the intervention to protect the crops. Morgan suggested they justify the intervention as necessary to suppress the insurrection. The US authorities, however, were afraid that such a justification would undermine the national and international position of the Menocal government, and instead announced that the goal of the intervention was to support Cuba as an ally in World War I, and the sugar harvest as the major contribution of Cuba at the Allied side.

== Intervention ==
On July 14, 1917, Menocal formally offered training camps in the province of Oriente to US troops. The first contingent, consisting of under 1,000 American Marines, came to Cuba on August 25, 1917. The operation was not an intervention; rather, the Cuban government formally invited the US army to train in a warm climate. As guests of the government, the US troops were obliged to stay within strict limits.

During the first year of arrival, the US Marines assumed responsibility for the objects of infrastructure related to sugar plantations. In October, they established a number of permanent camps. By November 1917, the presence of the troops caused anti-American protests. In December 1917, another thousand Marines arrived.

The troops performed patrols of the countryside to ensure that sugar plantations were safe. They also collected intelligence data, and passed their findings to the United States and Cuban authorities in Havana. They were instructed to fully cooperate with local authorities, in order to minimize friction in Cuban-American relations. The population generally remained hostile to the Marines. In 1918, partially as a result of the measures undertaken by the Marines, Cuba produced a record sugar harvest.

By mid-1918, the banditry and insurgency in the countryside ceased, and the main threat to sugar production was coming from the protests in the cities. The protests were mostly in the form of strikes, which targeted infrastructure for shipping and production of sugar. These protests were particularly strong in 1918 and 1919, and spread across the whole country. The American authorities preferred to represent these protests as political and leftist, which would justify intervention according to the Platt Amendment, even though such intervention would contradict the original 1917 agreement with the Cuban Government. In December 1918, an additional 1,120 Marines arrived at the Guantánamo naval base, and an additional six thousand were ready to arrive. Their field operations were modified accordingly, and Marines began patrolling the cities.

== Aftermath ==
The 3rd Marine Brigade was reinforced by the 1st Marines in November 1918 to ensure sugar production continued. By February 15, 1922, the only American presence in Cuba was at Guantanamo Bay.

== See also ==
- First Occupation of Cuba (1898–1902)
- Second Occupation of Cuba (1906–1909)
