= Azul y Blanco =

Azul y Blanco may refer to:

- Azul y Blanco (1914), a weekly political newspaper published from Tegucigalpa, Honduras
- Azul y Blanco (1935), a weekly political newspaper published from San Pedro Sula, Honduras
- Azul y Blanco (1946), a semi-daily newspaper published from San Pedro Sula, Honduras
- Azul y Blanco (Matagalpa weekly), a weekly newspaper published from Matagalpa, Nicaragua
