= Azul y Blanco (1946) =

- Type: Semi-daily
- Editor-in-chief: Marco A. Rápalo
- Founded: 1946
- Political alignment: Nationalist
- Language: Spanish language
- Headquarters: San Pedro Sula

Azul y Blanco (Spanish for 'Blue and White') was a semi-daily newspaper published in San Pedro Sula, Honduras. Politically, it had a Nationalist orientation.

Azul y Blanco was directed by Professor Manuel de J. Bueso. Marco A. Rápalo served as the Chief Editor and administrator of the newspaper. It was edited at Tipografía La Marina, owned by Ramón Discua.
