= Azul y Blanco (Matagalpa weekly) =

Weekly newspaper published in Matagalpa, Nicaragua

- Type: Weekly
- Editor-in-chief: Samuel Moya
- Language: Spanish language
- Headquarters: Matagalpa

Azul y Blanco (Spanish for 'Blue and White') was a weekly newspaper published from Matagalpa, Nicaragua, covering international news. As of 1909 Samuel Moya served as director and editor of the newspaper.
