= Azul y Blanco (1914) =

- Type: Weekly
- Editor-in-chief: Vidal Mejía
- Founded: 1914
- Language: Spanish language
- Headquarters: Tegucigalpa

Azul y Blanco (Spanish for 'Blue and White') was a political weekly newspaper published in Tegucigalpa, Honduras. It was founded in 1914. Vidal Mejía became the first editor of the newspaper in 1915.

Azul y Blanco was printed at the El Sol printing press in Comayagüela.
