= Azul y Blanco (1935) =

- Type: Weekly
- Founder: Dr. Octaviano Arias
- Founded: December 1, 1935
- Ceased publication: March 8, 1936
- Political alignment: Nationalist
- Language: Spanish language
- Headquarters: San Pedro Sula

Azul y Blanco (Spanish for 'Blue and White') was a weekly political newspaper published from San Pedro Sula, Honduras. It was founded by Dr. Octaviano Arias. Azul y Blanco argued from continuation of the rule of General Tiburcio Carias. It was published between December 1, 1935, and March 8, 1936.

Azul y Blanco was printed at Tipografía Cervantes, run by Héctor Pérez Estrada.
