= Spanish conquest of Honduras =

16th-century conflict in Central America

- Part of the Spanish colonization of the Americas
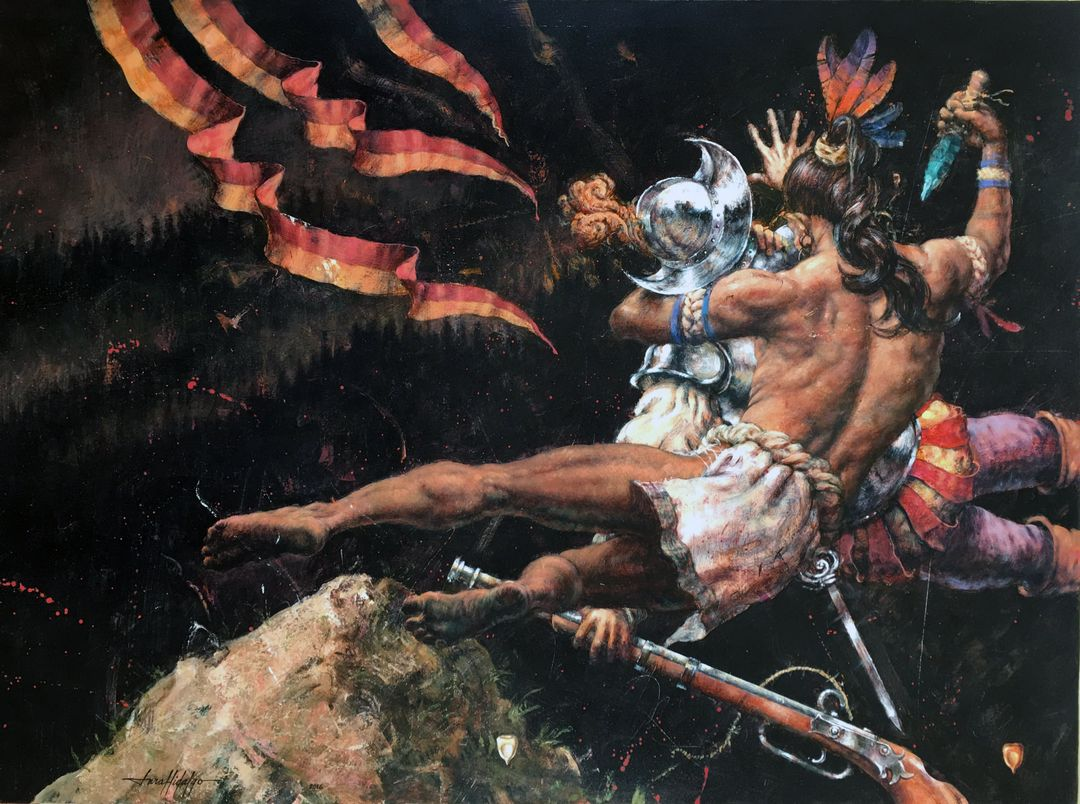
- Lempira stabbing a conquistador during the Spanish conquest, painting by Armando Lara
| Date | 1524 – c. 1539 |
| Location | Honduras, Central America |
| Result | Spanish victory |
| Territorial changes | Incorporation of Honduras into the Spanish Empire |

Belligerents
| (Spain) Spanish Empire, including Indian auxiliaries | Indigenous peoples of Honduras, including: Chorotega people; Ch'ol Maya people; Ch'orti' Maya people; Jicaque people; Lenca people; Pech people; Pipil people; Sumu people |

Commanders and leaders
| Hernán Cortés; Pedro de Alvarado; Francisco de Montejo | Q'alel; Cicumba; Lempira |

The Spanish conquest of Honduras was a 16th-century conflict during the Spanish colonization of the Americas in which the territory that now comprises the Republic of Honduras, one of the seven states of Central America, was incorporated into the Spanish Empire. In 1502, the territory was claimed for the king of Spain by Christopher Columbus on his fourth and final trip to the New World. The territory that now comprises Honduras was inhabited by a mix of indigenous peoples straddling a transitional cultural zone between Mesoamerica to the northwest, and the Intermediate Area to the southeast. Indigenous groups included Maya, Lenca, Pech, Miskitu, Mayangna (Sumu), Jicaque, Pipil and Chorotega. Two indigenous leaders are particularly notable for their resistance against the Spanish; the Maya leader Cicumba, and the Lenca ruler referred to as Lempira (a title meaning "Lord of the Mountain").

In March 1524, Gil González Dávila became the first Spaniard to arrive in what is now Honduras with the intention of conquest. He founded the first Spanish port upon the Caribbean coast, Puerto de Caballos, which became an important staging post for later expeditions. The early decades of the Spanish conquest of Honduras were beset by jurisdictional disputes between different Spanish colonies attempting to invade the territory, which resulted in conflict between rival expeditions launched from Mexico, Hispaniola, and Panama. The Spanish territory was reorganised as Higueras in the west, and Honduras in the east. As the Spanish became established throughout Central America, the colony of Honduras-Higueras became involved in territorial disputes with neighbouring colonies in Nicaragua, Guatemala and El Salvador.

From 1530, the colonists became the arbiters of power, installing and deposing governors. Spanish government in Honduras was riven by factionalism. As a response to the growing anarchy, the colonists requested that Pedro de Alvarado intervene. Alvarado arrived in 1536, put an end to the political infighting, and gained an important victory over Cicumba, a Maya leader in the Ulúa Valley. Alvarado founded two towns that later became important, San Pedro de Puerto Caballos (later to become San Pedro Sula) and Gracias a Dios.

In 1537, Francisco de Montejo was appointed governor. As soon as he arrived in Honduras, he cancelled the land distribution carried out by Alvarado. In that year, a great native uprising spread throughout Honduras, led by the Lenca ruler Lempira. Lempira held out for six months at his formidable stronghold at the Peñol de Cerquín ("Rock of Cerquín") before he was killed, during which time the uprising across Honduras threatened the existence of the Spanish colony. After Lempira's death, Montejo and his captain Alonso de Cáceres rapidly imposed Spanish dominion across most of Honduras; the main phase of the Spanish conquest was complete by 1539, although Olancho and the east were not brought within the Spanish Empire for some decades to come.

== Geography ==
The modern republic of Honduras lies in the heart of Central America; it covers an area of 112,090 square kilometres (43,280 sq mi) and is the second-largest country in Central America. The interior is mostly mountainous. It is bordered to the north by the Caribbean Sea, to the west by Guatemala, to the southwest by El Salvador, and to the southeast by Nicaragua. In the extreme south, Honduras has a portion of coastline on the Gulf of Fonseca, providing access to the Pacific Ocean. The Caribbean coast extends for 820 kilometres (510 mi), while the Pacific coast of the Gulf of Fonseca extends for 153 km (95 mi).

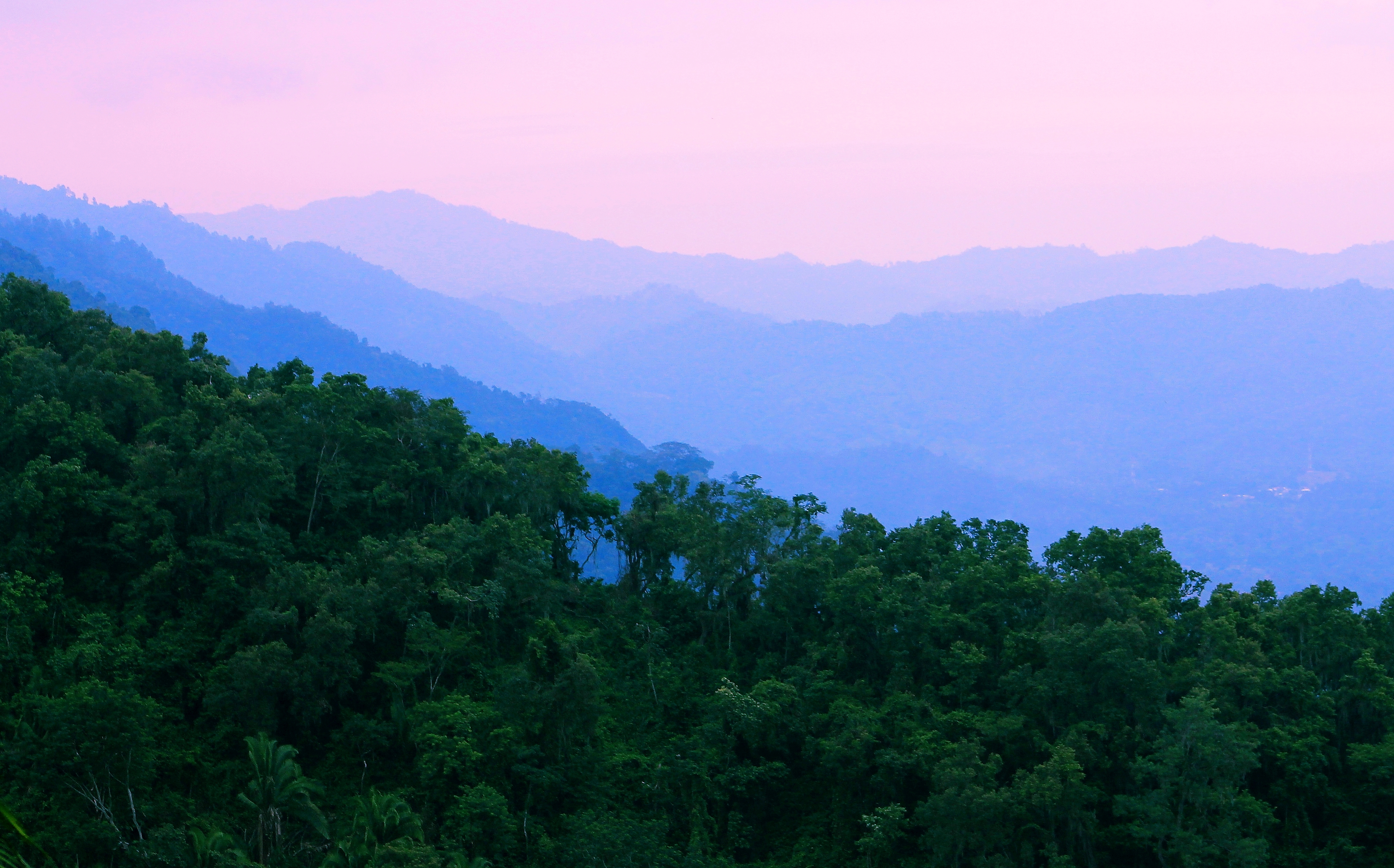
The rugged terrain of the Sierra del Merendón provided a refuge for its indigenous inhabitants

The country possesses four principal geographic regions, the largest of which consists of the mountainous highlands which cover approximately two-thirds of its territory. The highest mountain range in the highlands is the Sierra del Merendón; it runs from the southwest to the northeast and reaches a maximum altitude of 2,850 metres (9,350 ft) above mean sea level at Cerro Las Minas. The Nombre de Dios mountain range runs south of the Caribbean coast; it is less rugged and has a maximum altitude of 2,435 m (7,989 ft). The Entre Ríos mountains lay along a section of the Nicaraguan border. The highlands are punctuated by a number of fertile flat-floored valleys, lying at an altitude of between 300 and 900 m (980 and 2,950 ft). The Sula Valley runs from the Caribbean to the Pacific, offering a route between the Atlantic and Pacific oceans; it contains Honduras' most important river, the Ulúa River, which flows 400 km (250 mi) northeast into the Gulf of Honduras.

The Mosquito Coast is located in the east, near the Nicaraguan border, and consists of dense rainforest. The Caribbean lowlands form a thin strip along the coast. The central portion of the Caribbean lowlands is only a few kilometers in width, but in the east and west they form wide coastal plains. A smaller lowland region exists in the south around the Gulf of Fonseca, extending along a 25-kilometre (16 mi) wide strip on its north coast. The Bay Islands lie off the Caribbean coast. The three large islands are Roatán, Utila, and Guanaja. Minor islands include Barbareta, Cayos Cochinos, Helene and Morat. There are also over 60 minor islets.

=== Climate ===
Honduras has a tropical climate, divided into wet and dry seasons. Most rainfall occurs between May and September. The warmest month is April, and the coolest is January. In the highland valleys such as at Tegucigalpa, temperature varies between a minimum of 23 °C (73 °F) and a maximum of 30 °C (86 °F). Frost sometimes forms at altitudes of over 2,000 m (6,600 ft).

== Honduras before the conquest ==
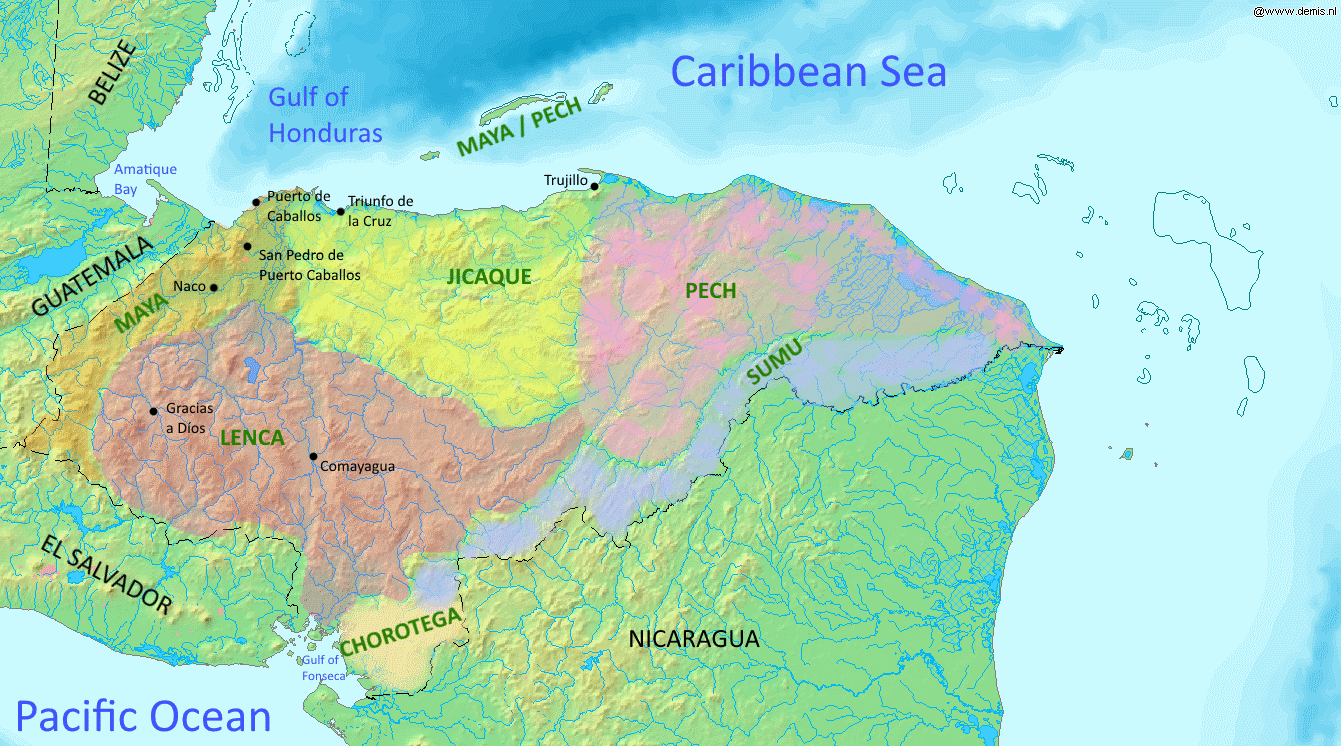
Map of approximate extent of indigenous ethnic groups in 16th-century Honduras

When the Spanish first arrived in what is now Honduras, most of the estimated population of 800,000 lived in the western and central regions. Honduras was a frontier region between Mesoamerica and the less complex societies to the south and southeast that were outside the direct Mesoamerican sphere of influence, although at times contact was direct and intense. Much of Honduras belonged to the so-called Intermediate Area, generally viewed as a region of lesser cultural development located between Mesoamerica and the Andean civilizations of South America. Cultural developments were closely related to those taking place in what is now El Salvador and Nicaragua, but also reflected cultural contacts with the Maya civilization and other Mesoamerican cultures such as those of the coast of the Gulf of Mexico and the central highlands of Mexico. The Pech people (formerly known as the Paya) occupied territory in the northeast of Honduras, possibly since antiquity. A similar scenario is proposed for those groups speaking Misumalpan languages, such as the Miskito and Mayangna peoples. The Pech, Miskito and Mayangna had cultural affinities to the south and east. The Lenca people occupied territories in central and southwestern Honduras, and although there were linguistically related groups further southeast, they had strong cultural links to Mesoamerica.

The Jicaque people also occupied lands in the region, in an area along the Atlantic coast from the Ulúa River east to an area between the Leán and Cuero rivers, and extending to the Nombre de Dios mountains. The Chorotega and the Pipil were both peoples belonging to the Mesoamerican cultural zone and fully partaking in it; the Pipil were found along the northern limits of Honduras, while the Chorotega occupied territory in the south, around the Gulf of Fonseca. Lenca and Nahuas inhabited the islands of the Gulf of Fonseca. Early colonial documents suggest that the important settlements of Naco and Quimistan, in the northwest, were multiethnic, inhabited by Pipil and Lenca or Maya, or all three. Naco in particular was a large town and an important centre for commerce that became an early focus for Spanish expeditions. Those groups in the northeast of Honduras were relatively isolated culturally, and not fully integrated into the exchange networks of either Mesoamerica or the Intermediate Area. The western fringe of Honduras was occupied by Maya peoples, the Ch'ol and the Ch'orti'. The Ch'ol occupied the region around the Amatique Bay and along the lower Chamelecón River. The Ch'orti' inhabited the upper reaches of the Chamelecón River and the Sensenti Valley.

== Background to the conquest ==
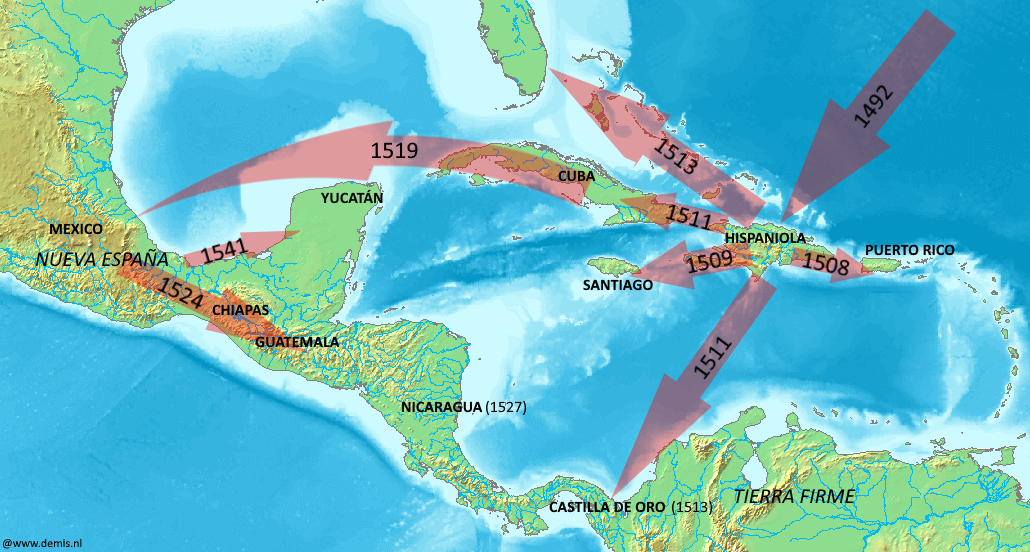
Map of Spanish expansion in the Caribbean during the 16th century

Christopher Columbus discovered the New World for the Kingdom of Castile and Leon in 1492. Private adventurers thereafter entered into contracts with the Spanish Crown to conquer the newly discovered lands in return for tax revenues and the power to rule. The Spanish founded Santo Domingo on the Caribbean island of Hispaniola in the 1490s. In the first decades after their discovery of the new lands, the Spanish colonised the Caribbean and established a centre of operations on the island of Cuba. After the discovery of Honduras by Columbus in 1502, no concerted effort to conquer the territory took place until 1524.

In the first two decades of the 16th century, the Spanish established their domination over the islands of the Caribbean Sea, and used these as a staging point to launch their campaigns of conquest on the continental mainland of the Americas. From Hispaniola, the Spanish launched expeditions and campaigns of conquest, reaching Puerto Rico in 1508, Jamaica in 1509, Cuba in 1511, and Florida in 1513. The Spanish heard rumours of the rich empire of the Aztecs on the mainland to the west of their Caribbean island settlements and, in 1519, Hernán Cortés set sail to explore the Mexican coast. By August 1521 the Aztec capital of Tenochtitlan had fallen to the Spanish. The Spanish conquered a large part of Mexico within three years, extending as far south as the Isthmus of Tehuantepec. The newly conquered territory became New Spain, headed by a viceroy who answered to the Spanish Crown via the Council of the Indies. The conquest of Central America that followed was effectively an extension of the campaign that overthrew the Aztec Empire; Cortés himself took an active part in the conquest of Honduras in 1524–1525. In the two-decade gap between the discovery of Honduras and attempts at colonisation, the Spanish also established themselves in Castilla del Oro. From there, various expeditions were launched northwards involving notable conquistadors such as Pedrarias Dávila, Gil González Dávila, and Francisco Hernández de Córdoba (not to be confused with the conquistador of the same name involved in the Spanish conquest of Yucatán).

In 1508, the Caribbean coast of Honduras was superficially explored by Spanish navigators Juan Díaz de Solís and Vicente Yáñez, but the focus of their expeditions lay further to the north. In the 1510s, expeditions from the Spanish settlements on Cuba and Hispaniola reported that the Bay Islands were inhabited. The first efforts to conquer Honduras were launched from several different areas of the Spanish Indies, including Hispaniola, Mexico, and Panama. This resulted in jurisdictional disputes over the territory that delayed the progress of the conquest.

== Conquistadors ==
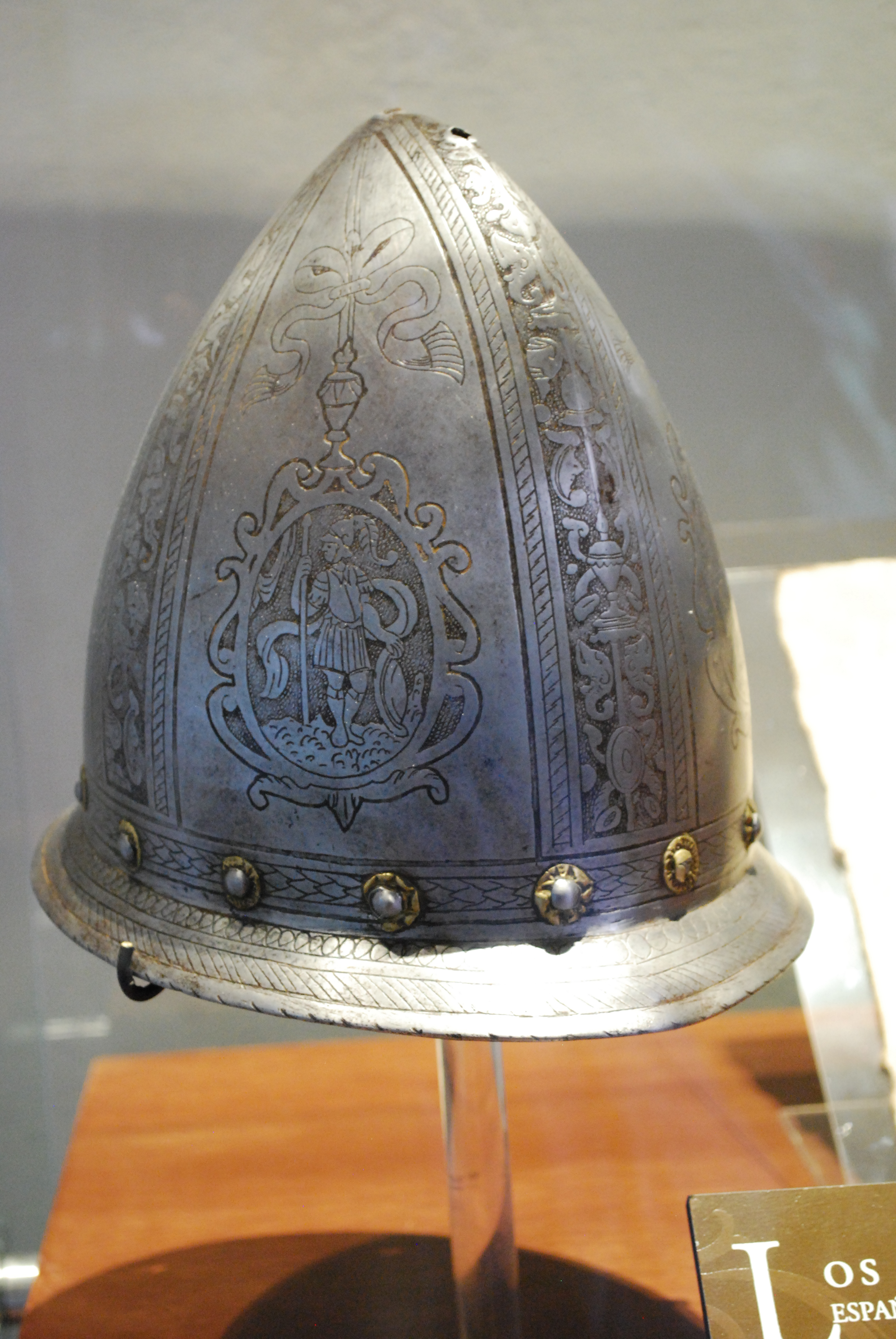
16th-century Spanish helmet

The conquistadors were all volunteers, the majority of whom did not receive a fixed salary but instead a portion of the spoils of victory, in the form of precious metals, land grants and provision of native labour. Many of the Spanish were already experienced soldiers who had previously campaigned in Europe. The 16th-century Spanish conquistadors were armed with broadswords, rapiers, crossbows, matchlocks and light artillery. Mounted conquistadors were armed with a 3.7-metre (12 ft) lance, that also served as a pike for infantrymen. A variety of halberds and bills were also employed. As well as the one-handed broadsword, a 1.7-metre (5.5 ft) long two-handed version was also used. Crossbows had 0.61-metre (2 ft) arms stiffened with hardwoods, horn, bone and cane, and supplied with a stirrup to facilitate drawing the string with a crank and pulley. Crossbows were easier to maintain than matchlocks, especially in the humid tropical climate of the Caribbean region.

Metal armour was of limited use in the hot, wet tropical climate. It was heavy and had to be constantly cleaned to prevent rusting; in direct sunlight, metal armour became unbearably hot. Conquistadores often went without metal armour, or only donned it immediately prior to battle. They were quick to adopt quilted cotton armour based upon that used by their native opponents, and commonly combined this with the use of a simple metal war hat. Shields were considered essential by both infantry and cavalry; generally this was a circular target shield, convex in form and fashioned from iron or wood. Rings secured it to the arm and hand.

=== Encomienda ===
Honduras was a relatively poor province and did not attract the most distinguished conquistadors. Most conquistadors and colonists who ventured to Honduras wanted to return quickly to Spain with new wealth and social status, immediate enrichment. The conquest was based on the distribution of encomienda rights and land concessions. (Note: The concepts of encomienda and repartimiento were closely linked. Repartimiento was the division and allocation of lands and their inhabitants upon being conquered. The Spaniard to whom they were first assigned was the encomendero. Upon the repartimiento being reassigned to another owner, it technically became an encomienda. In practice, especially during the early period of conquest, both terms were interchangeable.) Encomienda gave the encomendero (holder of the encomienda) the right to receive tribute and labour from the indigenous inhabitants of a defined area. Up until the middle of the 16th century, the encomendero could assign his own level of tribute and labour to be provided by the natives within his encomienda, which gave rise to much abuse.

The encomiendas established in Honduras were small, and did not generate rapid income. Social advancement was gained by overlordship of natives within the encomienda system. In Honduras, the conquistadors gained immediate income by selling natives into slavery on the Caribbean Islands and in Panama, and by mining activities. This in turn resulted in a reduction of indigenous population levels in Honduras, with a rapid drop in economic production during the first half of the 16th century. On the whole, the Spanish colonists were unwilling to invest time and resources into the long-term development of the agricultural production of their encomiendas in Honduras.

The Spanish established colonial settlements to extend their power over the surrounding territory, and to serve as administrative centres. They preferred to locate these towns in areas with dense native populations, or close to easily exploitable mineral wealth. Many Spanish towns were founded close to pre-Columbian centres of population. Trujillo was founded near the native settlement of Guaimura, and Comayagua was founded upon a pre-existing town of the same name.

In the first half of the 16th century, towns were abandoned or moved for a variety of reasons, including native attacks, harsh conditions, and the spread of Old World diseases such as smallpox, measles, typhoid, yellow fever, and malaria. In many cases, towns were moved for purely political reasons owing to infighting between Spanish factions, with those currently in power seeking to undermine the work of those who had come before them. The frequent relocation of colonial towns and the reallocation of encomiendas served to prolong political instability, and delay the progress of the conquest.

=== Colonial organisation ===
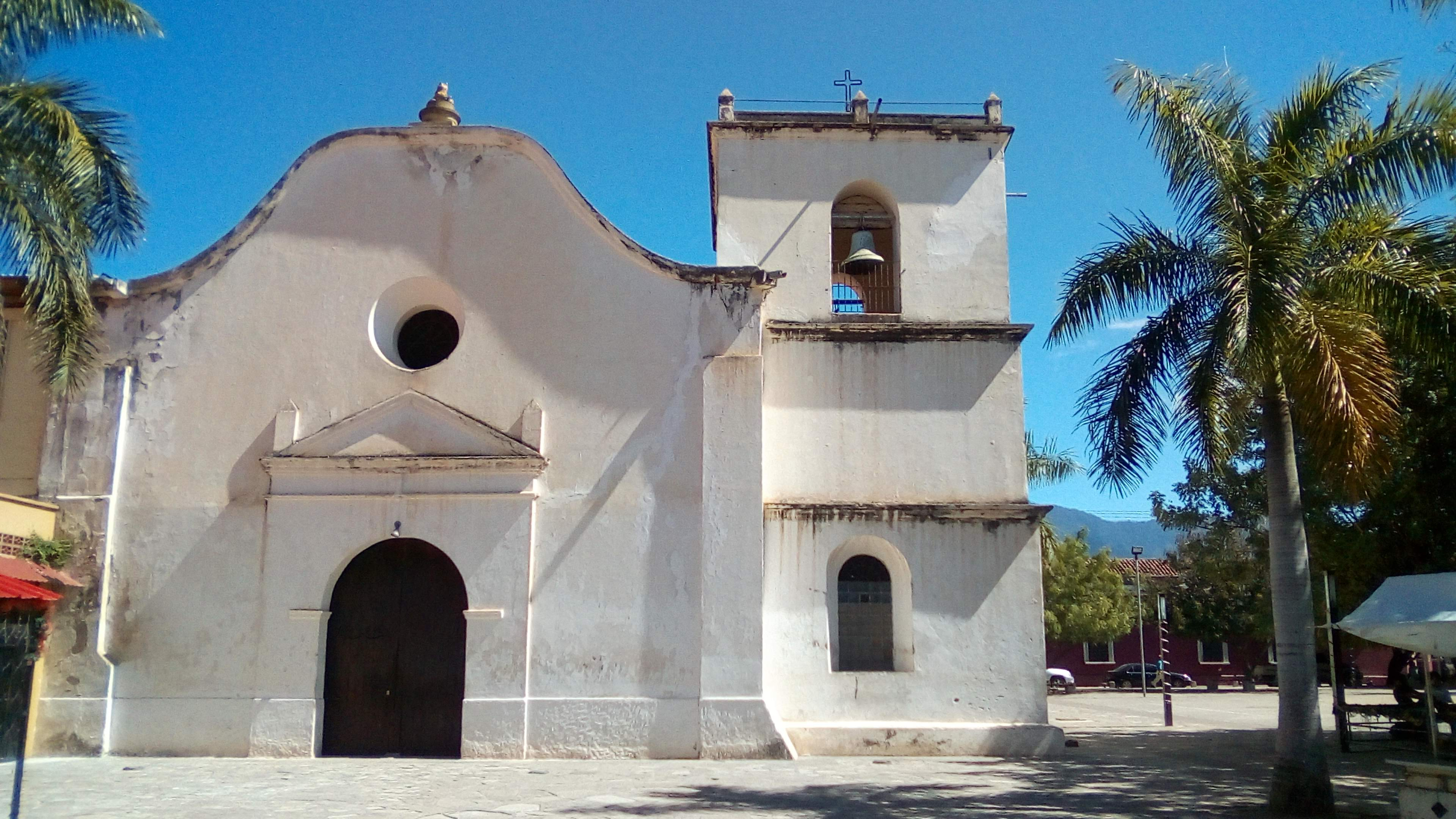
The Church of San Francisco of Comayagua is one of the oldest churches in Honduras.

The Spanish established Comayagua, originally called Nueva Valladolid de Comayagua ("New Valladolid of Comayagua") and Valle de Santa María de Comayagua ("Valley of Saint Mary of Comayagua"), as one of four top-tier gobiernos in Central America that served as administrative centres for commerce and industry. They established less important centres, such as Tegucigalpa, as alcaldías mayores, and more sparsely colonised areas as corregimientos. A number of indigenous settlements, referred to as pueblos de indios ("Indian villages"), comprised a corregimiento. The colonial corregidor governed the corregimiento, but the Spanish also appointed native officials, including the alcalde (or mayor) and his regidores, or councillors. All levels of colonial government were concerned with the collection of tribute and the organisation of native labour.

In 1544, the Spanish established the Audiencia de los Confines in Gracias a Dios (now Gracias, in Lempira Department, and not to be confused with the cape of the same name). They selected this location in western Honduras for its central location in Central America; it was a centre for mining with a high indigenous population. The Audiencia was established as the administrative centre governing Honduras, Chiapas, Costa Rica, Guatemala, Panama, Tabasco, and Yucatán. It was thought that this location would support the Audiencia of Guatemala.

== Indigenous weapons, strategies and tactics ==
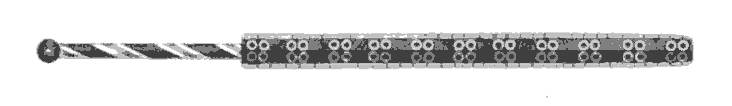
Native Honduran warriors used weapons similar to the Aztec Macuahuitl.

Native warriors primarily used arrows or darts with obsidian points. They also used spears and wooden swords edged with inset flakes of sharp stone (similar to the Aztec macuahuitl), stone-bladed knives, and slings. In response to Spanish incursions, native communities resorted to the fortification of their settlements with palisades and ditches. Palisades were built from rough courses of heavy wood, with openings for shooting arrows. They strengthened their fortifications with towers, and laid out camouflaged pits around the walls as a further defence. The construction of fortified settlements was not common in Honduras until after Spanish contact, although fortifications were known from contact with Maya groups to the west.

In Honduras their construction was a specific response to Spanish incursions, and they were often built hastily. Fortifications at the Maya town of Ticamaya in the Ulúa Valley were strong enough to frustrate several Spanish assaults. The Spanish considered the Lenca fortress at the Peñol de Cerquín as formidable as any they had seen in Europe. When attacked in their fortified mountaintop strongholds, they would roll large boulders down the mountainside onto the attacking forces. When the natives became aware of the hostile intentions of the Spanish, they often abandoned their settlements and fled to inaccessible regions.

== Discovery ==
Columbus' fourth voyage

On 30 July 1502, during his fourth voyage, Christopher Columbus arrived at Guanaja, one of the Bay Islands off the coast of Honduras. He sent his brother Bartholomew to scout the island. As Bartholomew explored the island with two boats, a large canoe approached from the west, apparently en route to the island. The canoe was carved from one large tree trunk and was powered by twenty-five naked rowers. Curious as to the visitors, Bartholomew Columbus seized and boarded it. He found it was a Maya trading canoe from Yucatán, carrying well-dressed Maya and a rich cargo that included ceramics, cotton textiles, yellow stone axes, flint-studded war clubs, copper axes and bells, and cacao. Also among the cargo were a small number of women and children, probably destined to be sold as slaves, as were a number of the rowers. The Europeans looted whatever took their interest from amongst the cargo and seized the elderly Maya captain to serve as an interpreter; the canoe was then allowed to continue on its way. It is likely that news of the piratical strangers in the Caribbean passed along the Maya trade routes.

A few days after this first encounter, on 14 August 1502, Columbus arrived on the mainland of Honduras. He dropped anchor at a place he named as Punta Caxinas, afterwards generally known as the Cape of Honduras, near the modern town of Trujillo. He claimed possession of the territory for the king of Spain, and the coastal inhabitants greeted him in a friendly manner. After this he sailed eastward along the coast, struggling against gales and storms for a month, until the coast turned southward along what is now the east coast of Honduras, and he entered calmer waters. The Spanish named this point Cabo Gracias a Dios, giving thanks for their liberation from the storms. Columbus sailed on southwards as far as Panama, before turning back into the Caribbean Sea to be wrecked off Jamaica, before being rescued and taken to Hispaniola, and from there returning to Spain.

== First expeditions ==
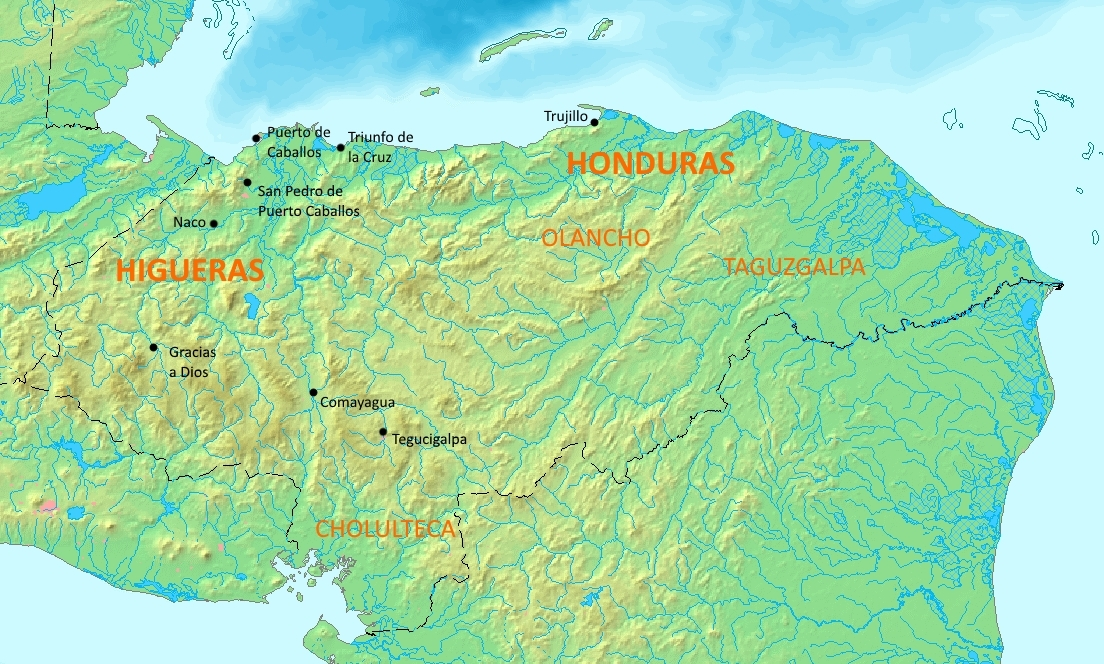
Early Spanish settlements and regions of 16th-century Honduras

The first four decades of conquest were a turbulent period; domination of Honduras was not achieved until 1539. The initial foci of Spanish settlement were Trujillo, Gracias a Dios, and the areas around Comayagua and San Pedro. Unlike in Mexico, where centralised indigenous power structures assisted swift conquest, there was no unified political organisation to overthrow; this hindered the incorporation of the territory into the Spanish Empire. Sometimes the Spanish would conquer an area and move on, just for it to immediately rise in rebellion, or massacre the Spanish colonisers. Initial Spanish efforts concentrated on establishing a presence along the Caribbean coast, with the founding of settlements such as Buena Esperanza, San Gil de Buena Vista, Triunfo de la Cruz, and Trujillo. Soon after, expeditions began to penetrate inland, against stiff indigenous resistance. In 1522, the natives of the Olancho Valley rose up and massacred the occupying Spanish forces.

Spanish infighting also hindered conquest. In 1522, Gil González Dávila and Andrés Niño set out from Panama along the Pacific coast. During this early expedition, they explored the south coast of what would become Honduras, entering the Gulf of Fonseca. Upon their return to Panama, the governor of Castilla del Oro, Pedro Arias Dávila (better known by the name of Pedrarias Dávila) decided to claim the territory they had explored. While Gil González Dávila was in Santo Domingo organising a new expedition to Central America, Pedrarias Dávila sent Francisco Hernández de Córdoba to establish his jurisdiction over the region. Spanish settlement in Nicaragua was concentrated along the Pacific coast, and Honduras was seen as a better route to the Caribbean and Spain rather than an inland route across Nicaragua itself. This provoked jurisdictional clashes between the two provinces.

== Rival conquests in the 1520s ==
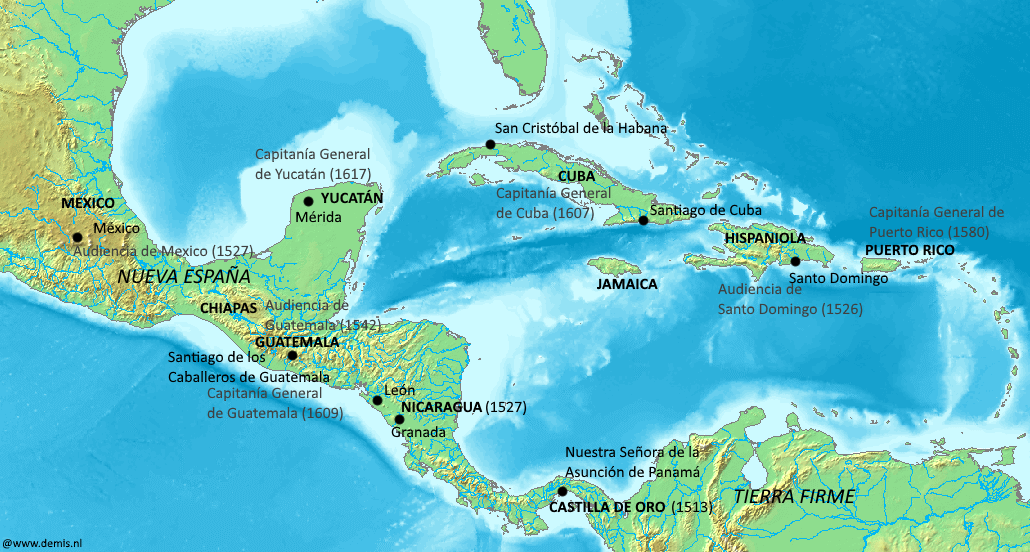
Map of Spanish provinces and jurisdictions in the Caribbean region during the 16th–17th centuries

A year after Gil González Dávila's discovery of the Gulf of Fonseca, various Spanish expeditions set out to conquer the territory of Honduras. These expeditions were launched southwards from Mexico and Guatemala, and northwards from Panama and Nicaragua; their rival captains clashed in Honduras, resulting in attempts at conquest of the natives being punctuated by battles between competing Spanish forces, and infighting within individual Spanish groups. The various Spanish groups also fielded indigenous auxiliaries to support their efforts.

In 1523, Hernán Cortés organised two expeditions towards Central America from Mexico, one by land and the other by sea. He commissioned the first to Pedro de Alvarado and the second to Cristóbal de Olid. Alvarado initiated the conquest of Guatemala, and then set out on an expedition into Honduras. Olid began the conquest of Honduras' interior, arriving in 1524, but soon set himself up independently of Cortés.

=== Gil González Dávila's expedition from Hispaniola, 1524 ===
Gil González Dávila set out from Santo Domingo early in 1524, with the intention of exploring the Caribbean coast of Nicaragua. His course took him to the north coast of Honduras, where he was beset by a storm. In order to lighten the load of his ships, he ordered that a number of horses be thrown overboard. This event resulted in the place being named Puerto de Caballos ("Port of Horses"). González Dávila landed on the north coast, with authorisation from the king to conquer Honduras, after having paid the royal fifth of the proceeds from his campaigns in Panama and Nicaragua, a sum totalling 112,524 gold castellanos. Puerto de Caballos later developed into an important staging point for the colonisation of the region.

From Puerto de Caballos, Gil González sailed west along the coast to the Amatique Bay, and founded a Spanish settlement near the mouth of the Río Dulce, within modern-day Guatemala, which he named San Gil de Buena Vista. He launched a campaign of conquest in the mountainous region dividing Honduras from Guatemala. González left some of his men under the command of Francisco Riquelme at San Gil de Buena Vista, and sailed back east along the coast to a point east of the Cape of Honduras (near modern Trujillo). From there he marched inland in search of a route to the Pacific Ocean. The colonists at San Gil de Buena Vista did not prosper, and soon searched of a more hospitable location. They resettled in the important indigenous town of Nito, near the mouth of the Dulce River.

=== Francisco Hernández de Córdoba's expedition from Nicaragua, 1524 ===
Pedrarias Dávila, who had established himself in Castillo del Oro, sent his deputy Francisco Hernández de Córdoba into Nicaragua to extend his authority over that region. While there, Hernández de Córdoba received news of a new Spanish presence to the north. Gil González Dávila was in the Olancho Valley when he received word that Hernández de Córdoba was somewhere nearby. Hernández de Córdoba sent out an advance party led by Gabriel de Rojas, who González Dávila received in peace. González instructed Rojas that neither Pedrarias Dávila nor Hernández de Córdoba had any rights over the territory, and that González would not permit them to take any action there. Rojas reported back to Hernández de Córdoba, who immediately dispatched soldiers from Nicaragua under the command of Hernando de Soto to capture González Dávila. The forces of González Dávila clashed with those of Soto at Toreba in Olancho; the exact site of the battle is unknown but was probably close to the modern settlement of Silca. Hernando de Soto was camped at Toreba, when González Dávila caught him by surprise with a night-time assault supported by cavalry, crossbowmen and arquebusiers. A number of Soto's men were killed in the fighting that followed. To give himself time for reinforcements to arrive, González Dávila sued for peace. He then launched a renewed assault, in which he succeeded in capturing de Soto, along with 130,000 pesos. Although he had won the day, González was aware that Hernández de Córdoba, de Soto's commander, was unlikely to let matters rest; and he also received news that Cristóbal de Olid had arrived on the north coast. Not wishing to be surrounded by hostile Spanish rivals, González set Soto free and rushed north with ten horsemen and twenty infantry.

=== Cristóbal de Olid's expedition from Mexico, 1524 ===
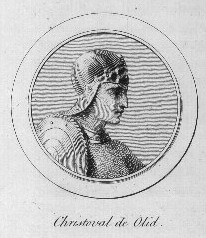
Cristóbal de Olid

Cristóbal de Olid sailed from Mexico in January 1524, stopping off in Cuba to collect supplies set aside for him by Hernán Cortés. The governor of Cuba, Diego Velázquez, was an enemy of Cortés and persuaded Olid to take Honduras for himself. Olid arrived off northern Honduras in early May, some distance to the east of Puerto de Caballos. He disembarked with 360 Spaniards and 22 horses, and founded Triunfo de la Cruz, still known by this name, near the modern port of Tela. He claimed the new territory in Cortés' name, but after founding the new town he openly rejected him, with the support of the majority of his men. He then carried out a campaign of conquest in what is now western Honduras, subjugating the heavily populated towns of Naco and Tencoa, which did little to resist.

=== Scramble for Honduras ===
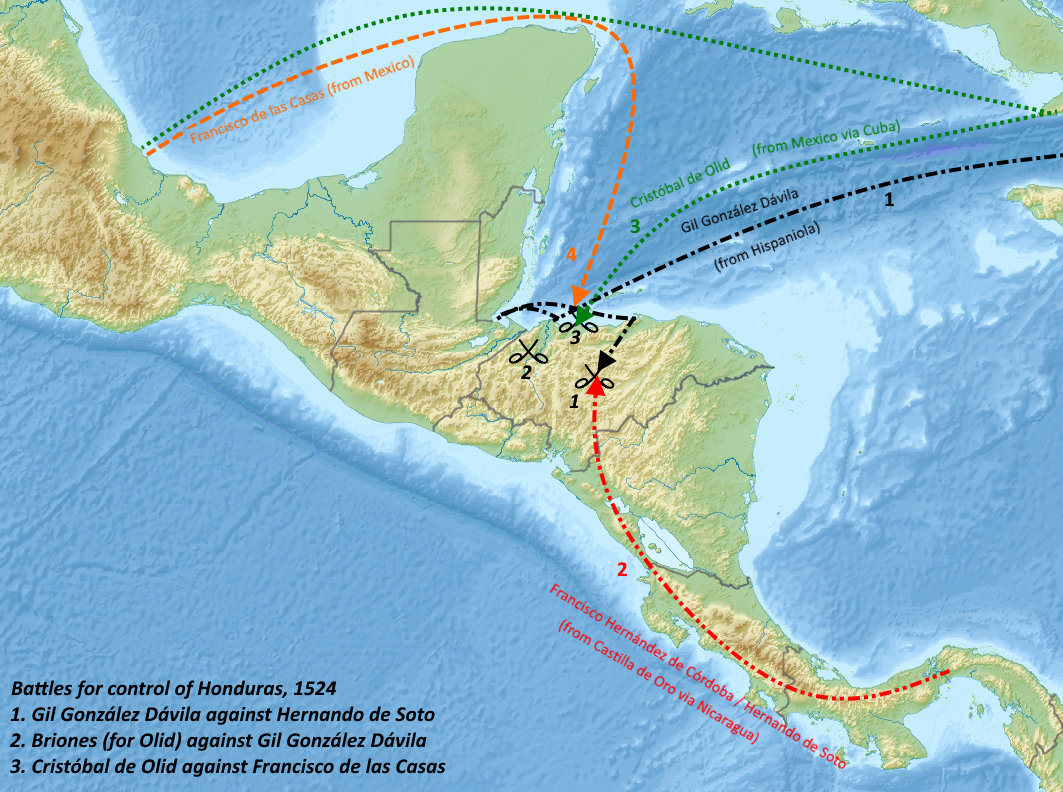
Routes of the rival expeditions of 1524

There were now four claimants to jurisdiction over Honduras. Gil González Dávila held royal authority over the province. Pedrarias Dávila claimed jurisdiction by right of the expeditions he had sent under Hernando de Soto and Francisco Hernández de Córdoba. Hernán Cortés claimed jurisdiction by right of the expedition he had sent under Cristóbal de Olid, and Olid had then claimed it in his own right. A fifth claimant would eventually appear in the form of the Real Audiencia of Santo Domingo, which would attempt to establish its own direct political control over the province. These rival claimants inevitably produced treachery, conflict, and outright civil war among the Spanish factions.

Hearing of Olid's rebellion, and of his clash with González, Cortés sent his cousin Francisco de las Casas to bring the rival captains into line. Cortés was confident that the majority of Olid's men would rally to las Casas, and only assigned him about 150 men for the expedition. Las Casas arrived off Triunfo de la Cruz as Olid was making preparations to attack Gil González Dávila, who was in the Naco valley.

González and Olid had arrived at an uneasy accord, neither wishing to openly clash with the other. However, Olid's men outnumbered those of his rival, and González had made the mistake of dividing his forces when he had left most of his companions on the banks of the Dulce River; Olid sent one of his captains, Pedro de Briones, to attack one portion of González' forces, while Olid made ready his ships to sail along the coast and attack other detachments. Briones swiftly weakened González' position and captured about half of his men. At this point, Las Casas' fleet appeared off the coast.

Olid sought to prevent Las Casas from disembarking, and hastily sent a message to recall Briones. The two Spanish fleets soon opened fire upon each other while Olid attempted to negotiate a truce in order to delay Las Casas offshore until Briones returned. Las Casas secretly sent messages to Briones, attempting to buy his support against Olid. Briones, looking out for his own interests, delayed his return. At this point, Las Casas' fleet was caught in a sudden storm and wrecked upon the Honduran coast, killing some of Las Casas' men. The survivors were captured by Olid.

Olid next marched inland to the Naco Valley. One of his captains caught González Dávila and his men by surprise, and marched them under guard back to Naco, where they were imprisoned. Now that Olid had gained the upper hand, Briones feared his vengeance for not coming to his support, and pledged his allegiance to Hernán Cortés. Olid imprisoned Las Casas in Naco with González.

Olid sent Briones to conquer more territory. Instead, Briones marched towards New Spain with his forces, arriving in the Guatemalan Highlands in the first half of 1525, where his men assisted in Pedro de Alvarado's campaigns against the highland Maya. In 1525, the Real Audiencia of Santo Domingo, based in Hispaniola, sent Pedro Moreno to Honduras in a separate attempt to mediate between Olid and González.

==== Death of Cristóbal de Olid ====
Olid treated González and Las Casas more as honoured guests than as prisoners. Pedro de Briones' abandonment of Honduras resulted in a significant weakening of Olid's forces. Las Casas and González Dávila took advantage of this opportunity, and of Olid's excessive trust in his prisoners, to attack Olid and escape from their confinement. Once free, they expected support from Briones. Seizing their opportunity, González and Las Casas set upon Olid one evening and seriously wounded him. Olid managed to escape and hid in an Indian hut, but he was quickly found, and subjected to a rapid trial.

Olid was executed by having his throat cut in the plaza at Naco. After the death of Olid, Spanish relations with the natives of Naco deteriorated notably. The Indians were increasingly unwilling to provide the Spanish with food and other supplies, and most of the Spanish abandoned the settlement and either returned to Mexico or resettled in other parts of Honduras. A court in Mexico subsequently condemned Las Casas and González Dávila for their execution of Olid, but neither was ever punished.

=== Founding of Trujillo, 1525 ===
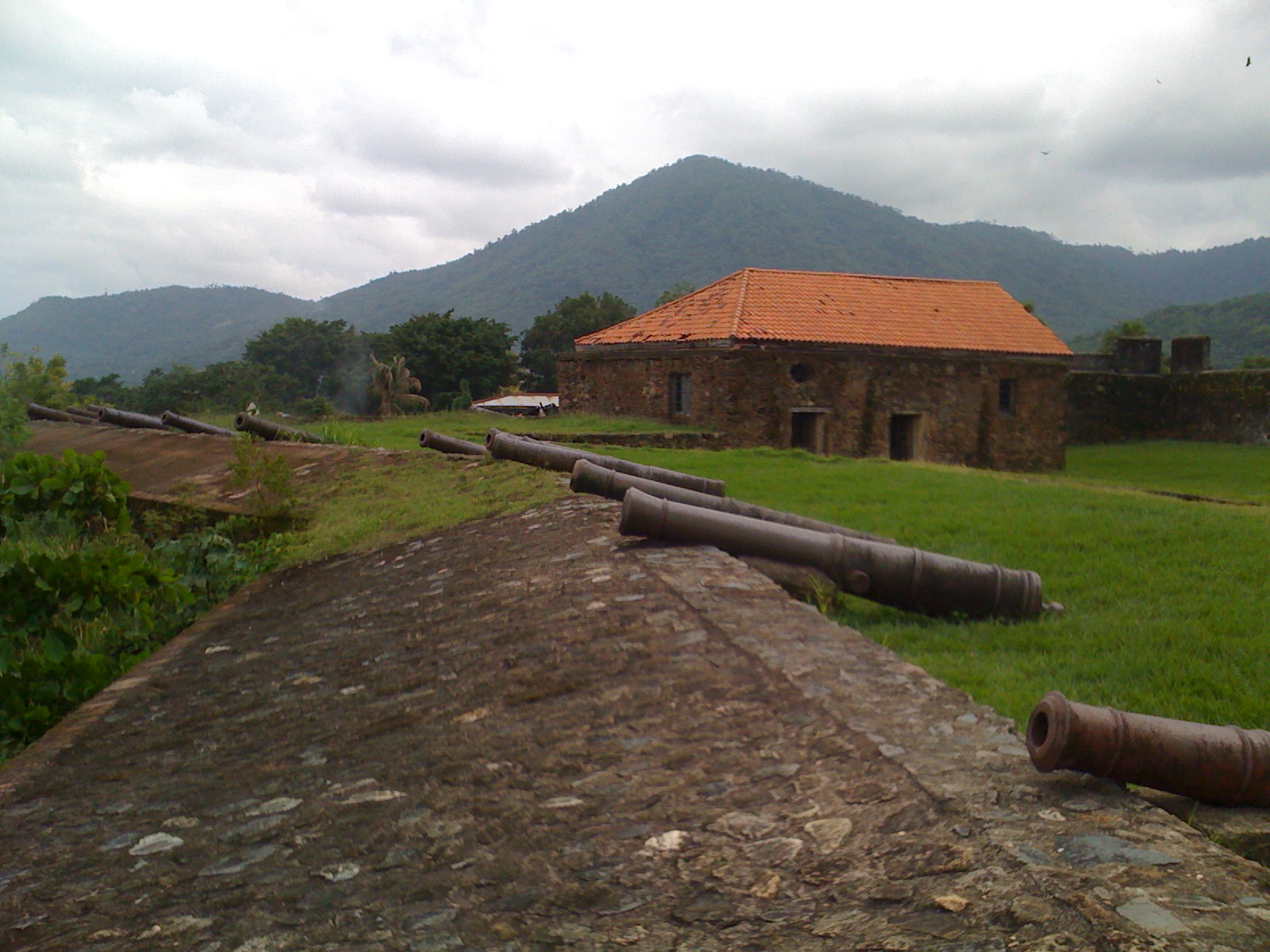
Fortress of Santa Barbara in Trujillo, is the oldest fortress in American mainland.

With the death of Olid, Las Casas declared Cortés' jurisdiction over the colony. Those Spanish remaining in Honduras divided into several groups. The majority remained in the territory, under the command of Francisco de las Casas. Las Casas considered the harbour at Triunfo de la Cruz to be inadequate, so he planned its relocation to Puerto de Caballos. Las Casas was impatient to return to New Spain, so he gave command of the province to Juan López de Aguirre and authorised him to relocate the port. Las Casas returned to Mexico via the Pacific coast of Guatemala; he took Gil González with him, and found Pedro de Briones in Guatemala, whom he hanged as a traitor. López de Aguirre rejected Puerto de Caballos as the location for the new town, and instead sailed east with half of his men to the Cape of Honduras, near where Columbus had first landed. The rest of his people followed east on foot. López de Aguirre did not wait for them, and sailed away, abandoning Honduras. When the land party arrived, although troubled by the desertion of López de Aguirre, they settled in Trujillo as planned, The town was founded in May 1525, in the largest sheltered bay on the Caribbean coast of Central America.

Pedro Moreno, sent from the Audiencia of Santo Domingo in Hispaniola, arrived in Honduras shortly after the founding of Trujillo. He found forty colonists in a desperate state, lacking weapons and provisions. A few more Spaniards were still at Nito, the remnants of González Dávila's men, where their plight was even worse. The residents of Trujillo pleaded with Moreno for assistance, which he granted on condition that they renounced Cortés, accepted the jurisdiction of the Audiencia of Santo Domingo, and agreed to take Juan Ruano, one of Olid's former officers, as Chief Magistrate. Moreno renamed Trujillo as Ascensión, and he sent messages to Hernández de Córdoba, who was in Nicaragua, asking him to renounce his loyalty to Pedrarias Dávila and pledge allegiance to Santo Domingo. Moreno then returned to Hispaniola, promising to send aid. As soon as he was gone, the residents restored the name of Trujillo, pledged their allegiance once more to Cortés, and expelled Juan Ruano.

== Hernán Cortés, 1525–1526 ==
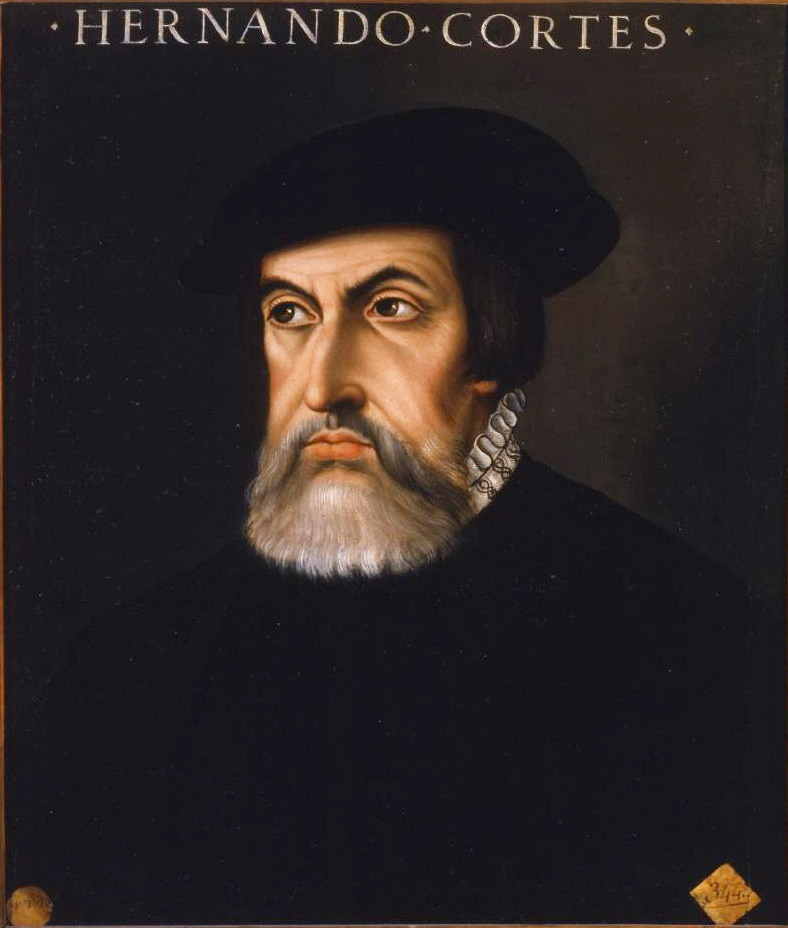
Hernán Cortés arrived in Honduras after the defeat of the Aztec Empire.

Hernán Cortés only received sporadic reports of developing events in Honduras, and became impatient for its incorporation into his command. Hopeful of discovering new riches, he decided to travel to Honduras in person. Cortés left Tenochtitlan on 12 October 1524 with 140 Spanish soldiers, 93 of them mounted, 3,000 Mexican warriors, 150 horses, a herd of pigs, artillery, munitions and other supplies. En route, he recruited 600 Chontal Maya carriers. During the arduous journey from Lake Petén Itzá to Lake Izabal, both now in Guatemala, Cortés lost many men and horses. He crossed the Dulce River to the settlement of Nito, somewhere on the Amatique Bay, with about a dozen companions, where he found the near-starving remnants of Gil González Dávila's colonists, who received him joyfully. Cortés waited there for the rest of his army to regroup over the next week, and explored the local area for supplies. By this time the remnants of Cortés' expedition were reduced to a few hundred. Cortés sent some of González Dávila's colonists south to the Naco Valley, which was swiftly pacified under the command of Gonzalo de Sandoval, one of Cortés' lieutenants. Cortés then abandoned attempts to colonise Nito, and sailed to Puerto de Caballos with his entire company.

Cortés arrived in Honduras in 1525, bringing livestock with him. Cortés claimed jurisdiction over Honduras, although its extent was still unknown. He rapidly imposed his authority over the rival Spanish factions there, as well as some native groups. He founded the settlement of Natividad de Nuestra Señora near Puerto de Caballos, settled fifty colonists there, and placed Diego de Godoy in charge. Cortés then sailed on to Trujillo. Conditions in Natividad were unhealthy, and half of the Spanish settlers rapidly succumbed to disease. With the permission of Cortés, the rest moved inland to the fertile Naco Valley, where Sandoval had securely established a Spanish presence.

Cortés found affairs in Trujillo to be satisfactory since the departure of Moreno, and sent letters to Santo Domingo in an effort to obtain their recognition of his jurisdiction over the colony. He dispatched ships to Cuba and Jamaica to bring supplies, including domestic animals and plants for cultivation. Cortés sent his cousin Hernando de Saavedra inland, and he overcame local resistance to bring several well-populated districts under Spanish control. Indigenous leaders travelled from far and wide to pledge allegiance to Cortés, whom they considered to be more fair in his dealings than other Spanish captains. With the application of diplomacy, moderate treatment of the natives, and the judicious application of force, Cortés tightened the Spanish grip over Honduras.

=== Subjugation of the northern Nahuas ===
While in Trujillo, Cortés received messengers from Papayeca, a large native town some seven leagues (Note: The Spanish legua unit of measurement was equal to 5000 varas. This was approximately 4.2 km (2 5/8 mi). All distances in this article are based upon this conversion but are subject to often very approximate estimates given in the sources.) away, and Champagua (now known as Chapagua), another nearby town. Both of these settlements were inhabited by Nahuas. Cortés recorded the names of two Nahua rulers as Pizacura and Mazatl. Pizacura resisted Cortes' overtures and refused to swear fealty; Cortés sent Spanish cavalry and infantry, accompanied by a great number of Indian auxiliaries. They launched a night attack upon Pizacura's village in the Agalta Valley, and captured the Nahua leader with a hundred of his people. The majority were enslaved, while Pizacura was held as a prisoner with two other nobles, and a young man whom Cortés suspected of being the true leader of his people. Pizacura claimed that his resistance was instigated by Mazatl, who opposed peace with the Spanish invaders. Cortés captured Mazatl and asked him to order his subjects to return to their abandoned villages. Mazatl refused, so Cortés hanged him in Trujillo.

=== Gabriel de Rojas and Gonzalo de Sandoval in Olancho ===
Gabriel de Rojas was still in Olancho, and was told by native informants of new Spanish arrivals in Trujillo. He sent a letter and gifts with messengers, who met Gonzalo de Sandoval, who was imposing Spanish control over Papayeca at that time, then proceeded onwards to Cortés at Trujillo. Cortés at first responded in a friendly manner to Rojas' overtures. Rojas' party was attempting to expand Hernández de Córdoba's Nicaraguan territory; upon meeting native resistance his men began pillaging the district and enslaving the inhabitants. Upon receiving complaints from native informants, Cortés dispatched de Sandoval with ten cavalry to hand papers to Rojas, ordering him out of the territory, and to release any Indians and their goods that he had seized. Sandoval was under orders to either capture Rojas, or expel him from Honduras, but in the event was unable to do either, due to the intervention of other Spaniards present who tried to calm the situation. While the two groups were still gathered, Rojas received orders from Francisco Hernández de Córdoba to return to Nicaragua to assist him against his rebellious captains, while Sandoval returned to face Cortés' displeasure.

Hernández de Córdoba sent a second expedition into Honduras, carrying letters to the Real Audiencia of Santo Domingo and to the Crown, searching for a good location for a port on the Caribbean coast, to provide a link to Nicaragua. The expedition was intercepted and captured by Sandoval, who sent some of the Nicaraguan party back to Cortés at Trujillo. They informed Cortés of Hernández de Córdoba's plan to set himself up in Nicaragua independently of Pedrarias Dávila in Panama. Cortés responded courteously and offered supplies while the expedition was passing through Honduras, but sent letters advising Hernández de Córdoba to remain loyal to Pedrarias Dávila.

=== Hernando de Saavedra ===
Hernán Cortés was troubled by news that his enemies in New Spain were gaining control of Mexico; when Cortés received news that Pedro Moreno would soon be arriving in Honduras with many colonists, and official documents from the Real Audiencia of Santo Domingo, he decided against further exploration and instead returned to Mexico, leaving on 26 April 1526. He took Pizacura to Mexico with him, where he died not long afterwards of a fatal illness. Gonzalo de Sandoval also returned to Mexico, marching overland via Guatemala. Cortés installed his cousin Hernando de Saavedra as governor of the new territory, and left Saavedra with instructions to treat the natives fairly; however Saavedra's actions reopened underlying divisions between rival groups of colonists.Saavedra rapidly established rule over what is now the department of Olancho; he sent Bartolomé de Celada inland to find a good location for a new Spanish town. He founded Frontera de Cáceras upon the savannah of the Olancho valley, near the Indian towns of Telica and Escamilpa, within the disputed territory between Honduras and Nicaragua.

Meanwhile, Pedrarias Dávila travelled to Nicaragua from Panama, executed Hernández de Córdoba, and took direct control of the province. He claimed Honduras for himself and sent several expeditions into the Olancho Valley. Saavedra demanded that Pedrarias Dávila withdraw, and received conciliatory messages in return. Dávila then launched a surprise attack against Cortes' supporters, capturing a number of them in Olancho, then marching north with the intention of launching an attack upon Puerto de Caballos. Saavedra received news of the northward assault and dispatched a larger force to counter Pedrarias Dávila's captains. After negotiations, both forces agreed to retreat. In the event, Dávila's force reneged on the agreement and split into two. One portion continued its march towards Puerto de Caballos while the other returned to Olancho to found a settlement and hold the valley for Pedrarias Dávila.

Pedraria Dávila's forces in the Olancho valley treated the natives harshly, provoking the Indians to rise against them throughout the province. They attacked the newly founded settlement and killed many of the Spanish there, including their commanding officer. The Spanish survivors fled and found refuge with an indigenous leader who had not joined the revolt. Natives in the north launched an overwhelming assault upon Natividad de Nuesta Señora near Puerto Caballos, forcing the Spanish there to hold up in a natural stronghold, and send a request for reinforcements to Saavedra, who was unable to spare any men to relieve them. Pedrarias Dávila's men who were marching to attack Puerto de Caballos turned back to Olancho, to find the Spanish settlement there had been sacked. They found refuge with the survivors to maintain a precarious presence in support of Pedrarias Dávila's claim over Honduras.

Hernando de Saavedra protested against Pedrarias Dávila's aggression but judged his own forces insufficient to attack Dávila's men in Olancho. Dávila in turn sent messengers to demand that Saavedra and the town council of Trujillo submit to his rule. The Spanish Crown was now taking a direct interest in the chaotic state of affairs in Central America. It was taking efforts to place Crown officials as governors, and creating colonial organisations such as the audiencias (courts) to impose absolute government over territories claimed by Spain. In so doing, it ended the era of distinguished conquistadors setting themselves up as overlords of territories they had conquered. On 30 August 1526, Diego López de Salcedo was appointed by the Crown as governor of Honduras. He left Santo Domingo in early September, and the Audiencia ordered all rival claimants out of the colony.

== Crown authorities try to take control, 1526–1530 ==
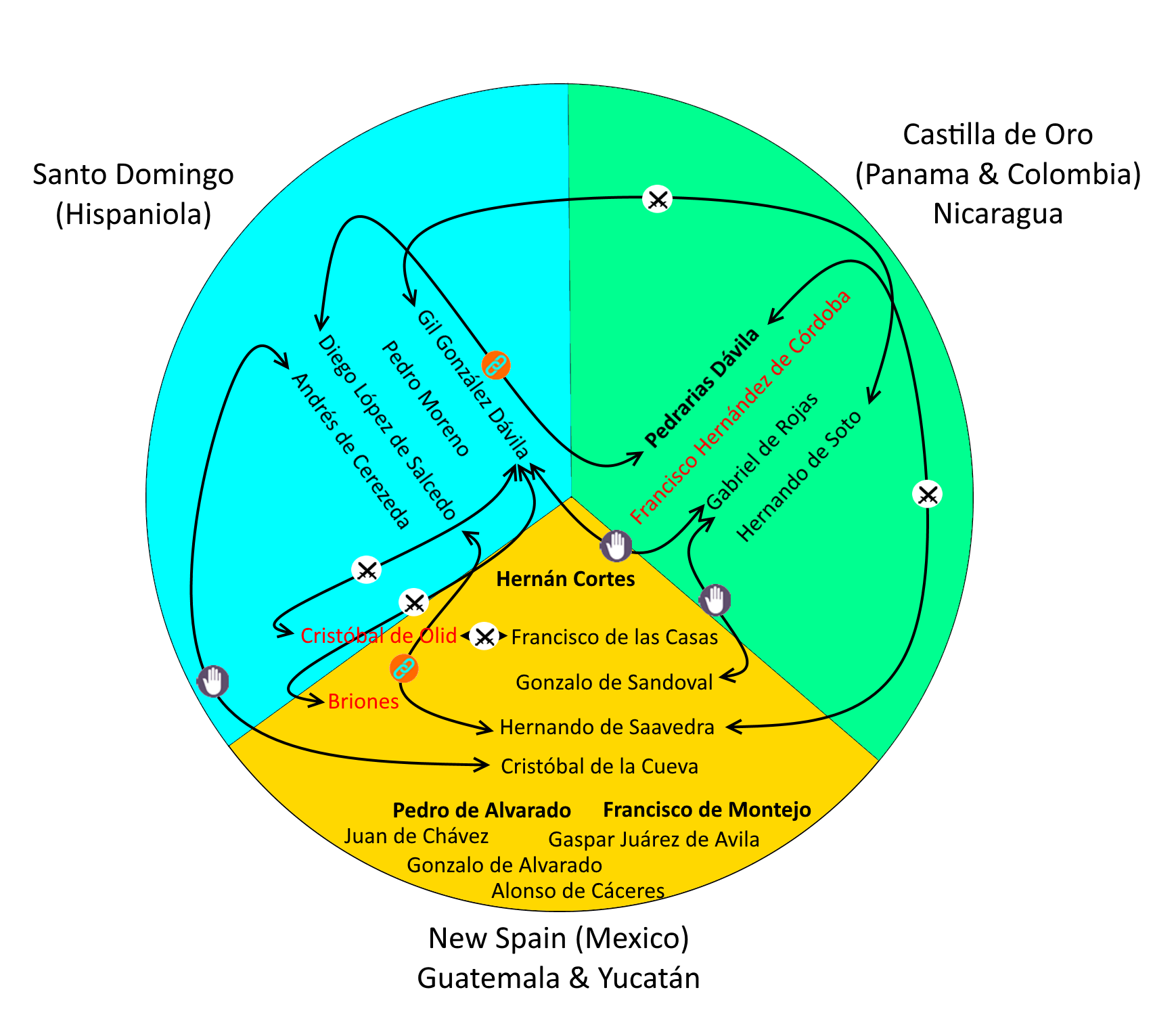
Diagram simplifying interactions between Spanish officers from different jurisdictions, including stand-offs, battles, and incarcerations

Diego López de Salcedo sailed from Santo Domingo with two ships, carrying a large number of soldiers, as well as provisions and clothing he intended to sell to the colonists. Contrary winds delayed López de Salcedo off Jamaica for a month; he eventually disembarked in Trujillo on 26 October 1526, after a lengthy standoff with Hernando de Saavedra that almost came to violence. At last Saavedra was convinced that López de Salcedo had been authorised directly by the Crown, and allowed him to come ashore.

López de Salcedo was under orders to investigate the state of affairs in the troubled province, and take whatever actions were necessary to impose order. He and his immediate successors promoted their own personal ambitions over the good government of Honduras, sowing division amongst the colonists, and instituting harsh policies against the indigenous population. In 1527 the natives rebelled against their brutal treatment. The punishment meted out to the rebellious Indians only served to incite further revolts. López de Salcedo arrested Saavedra and his supporters and shipped them to Santo Domingo to be tried by the Real Audiencia. The prisoners seized control of the ship and sailed for Cuba.

After López de Salcedo had been installed as governor, the emissaries that had been sent by Pedrarias Dávila arrived, expecting to find Saavedra. Although they did not dare to present Dávila's demands to a Crown representative, López de Salcedo had them imprisoned. When the Crown had appointed the new governor, it had not defined the limits of Honduras. Pedrarias Dávila had been replaced by a Crown representative in July 1526; this prompted López de Salcedo to claim jurisdiction over Nicaragua, based upon the actions of Gil González Dávila and Hernán Cortés. He left a few men under the command of Francisco de Cisneros in Trujillo, and marched with 150 men to impose his authority over Nicaragua.

=== Native unrest, 1528 ===
López de Salcedo moved Trujillo upslope from its previous swampy location. In 1528, López de Salcedo spent a month in the Olancho Valley, which at this time was likely to have been inhabited by Pech. He attempted to bring the inhabitants under his control, spurring them into preparation to resist further Spanish incursions. He hanged several indigenous leaders who had taken part in the attack on Natividad de Nuestra Señora, and imposed such harsh obligations upon the natives that they burned their villages and their crops and fled into the mountains. In Olancho, López de Salcedo unsuccessfully clashed with rival Spaniards that he found still there. Unrest among the natives spread widely, from Comayagua to as far south as Nicaragua, causing difficulties in procuring provisions, and presenting constant danger to the expedition. Nevertheless, he continued onwards to León, in Nicaragua. At about this time, Pedrarias Dávila was appointed governor of Nicaragua after vigorously protesting his loss of governorship over Castilla del Oro.

While López de Salcedo was in Nicaragua, Francisco de Cisneros was unable to establish his authority over Trujillo and its citizens soon deposed him. López de Salcedo sent messages appointing Diego Méndez de Hinostrosa as his lieutenant, but his opponents imprisoned the new appointee and replaced him with Vasco de Herrera, one of the regidores of Trujillo municipal council. Vasco de Herrera sent an expedition into the Olancho Valley to subjugate the natives, harassing the local populace and enslaving many Indians.

=== First governor's imprisonment and death, 1528–1530 ===
Pedrarias Dávila travelled from Panama to take up his command of Nicaragua, and was greeted everywhere as the rightful governor. López de Salcedo attempted to leave the province and return to Honduras but was prevented by his rival's supporters. Pedrarias Dávila arrested López de Salcedo in March 1528 and forced him to relinquish some of his territory, although the Spanish monarch later rejected the settlement. Dávila kept López de Salcedo prisoner for almost a year. He released him after coming to an agreement with mediators, in which the jurisdictional limits of Honduras were defined by the Caribbean coast extending from Puerto de Caballos in the west to Cabo Gracias a Dios in the east and extending inland in the form of a triangle. This agreement effectively settled all jurisdictional disputes with Nicaragua; border disputes with Guatemala remained a problem. López de Salcedo returned to Honduras early in 1529 as a broken man; he was unable to settle the dispute between Diego Méndez de Hinostrosa and Vasco de Herrera, and was held in contempt by many residents of Trujillo. In order to reestablish his reputation, he organised a large expedition to settle the Naco valley, where gold had been discovered. López de Salcedo, weakened by his ordeals, did not live to lead the expedition; he died early in 1530.

== Ch'orti' resistance, 1530–1531 ==
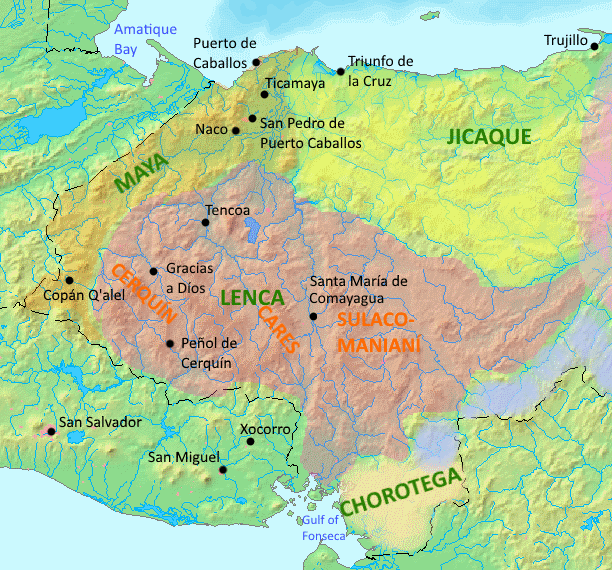
Map of western Honduras, with placenames and Lenca provinces mentioned in the article

At the time of the conquest, Q'alel (Note: Q'alel is sometimes referred to as Copan Galel or Copan Calel.) was a ruler of the Ch'orti' Maya of what is now western Honduras. Q'alel was the lord of Copán, a town near modern Rincón del Jicaque, which should not be confused with the archaeological site. Q'alel fortified Copán with a strong wooden palisade and surrounding moat, and gathered an army of 30,000 warriors to drive out the Spanish. The Spanish assault came from the direction of Guatemala, after Ch'orti' attacks on Spanish settlers there. In early 1530, Pedro de Alvarado sent a detachment of Spanish troops with indigenous allies to put down the resistance on his borders, under the command of Hernando de Chávez, Jorge de Bocanegra and Pedro Amalín. Q'alel rejected messengers demanding his submission. The Ch'orti' fortifications were strong enough to hold the Spanish and their indigenous auxiliaries at bay for several days, but eventually they managed to cross the moat and breach the palisade, routing the defenders. Ch'orti' resistance was crushed by the following year, and most of the fighting was over by April 1531.

== Anarchy ==
After 1530, it was the colonists themselves who held the keys to power, installing new governors and removing them from office. By 1534, the Spanish colony in Honduras was close to collapse. Trujillo had a population of less than two hundred; it was the only Spanish settlement in Honduras, and very little territory beyond the town itself had been conquered. The Spanish were beset by infighting, and had provoked widespread indigenous uprisings. Simultaneously, the native population had collapsed as a result of disease, mistreatment, and the export of large numbers to work on the sugar plantations of the Caribbean islands.

Before he died, López Salcedo appointed contador (teller, clerk) Andrés de Cerezeda as his successor. Cerezada was unable to impose his authority over the residents of Trujillo, with two rival claimants struggling for power. Vasco de Herrera was supported by the town council, and was strong enough to force Cerezeda to agree to a power-sharing compromise. In reality, it was Vasco de Herrera who wielded true authority over the province.

The expedition to the Valley of Naco, organised by López de Salcedo before he died, arrived at its destination and founded a new settlement, called Nuestra Señora de la Encarnación. At the same time, Spanish captain Alonso Ortiz pacified the restless natives of a district near Trujillo. At first the natives fled, but he persuaded them to return to their homes.

The hostility between rival Spanish factions in Trujillo continued, and Vasco de Herrera was unable to unite the colonists behind him. He decided the best option would be to found a new town, and possibly abandon Trujillo. Cerezeda opposed him at every turn, believing this would lead to the ruin of the Spanish enterprise in Honduras. Natives working the mines near Trujillo rebelled against their excessive tax burden, killing several Spaniards. Vasco de Herrera seized this opportunity as an excuse to launch a punitive expedition, but instead marched inland in an attempt to found another colony. The Nahuas of Papayeca rebelled against the excessive cruelty of Andrés de Cereceda under their leader Picecura, (Note: Picecura was apparently a different leader from Pizacura, who Cortés had taken to Mexico.) and fled to the wilds. In 1531, Vasco de Herrera attempted to bring them back to their settlements.

=== Deaths of Vasco de Herrera and Méndez de Hinostrosa ===
Cerezeda left Trujillo temporarily and, with Vasco de Herrera also gone, Méndez de Hinostrosa attempted to seize sole power. Vasco de Herrera at length returned, but had left many of his soldiers fighting native resistance in the Valley of Olancho, led by his brother Diego Díaz de Herrera. Vasco de Herrera ordered that Méndez de Hinostrosa be executed, but he sought sanctuary in a church and his supporters soon rallied to him, outnumbering Vasco de Herrera's men in Trujillo. Cerezeda returned to Trujillo and attempted to mediate between the opposing factions, but Vasco de Herrera was assassinated and Méndez de Hinostrosa seized control of the town. Cerezeda refused to recognise him, and both parties sent urgent messages to Diego Díaz de Herrera in Olancho, requesting his support; many of his men expressed their support for Méndez de Hinostrosa. Cerezeda acted quickly and fierce fighting erupted in Trujillo. Cerezeda captured Méndez de Hinostrosa and beheaded him. Finally, after a year of Spanish infighting, Cerezeda emerged as sole governor of Honduras.

=== New Spanish arrivals, 1532–1533 ===
The Crown responded to reports of anarchy in Honduras by naming the elderly Diego Alvítez as the royal governor. Alvítez's fleet was wrecked some leagues away from Trujillo towards the end of October 1532, and he finished his journey on foot. By the time he arrived in the colonial capital, soon after Cerezeda had taken sole charge, he was near death. On 2 November, he named Cerezeda as acting governor, and died soon afterwards. Opposing factions once again formed, one of them headed by Diego Díaz de Herrera, and Cerezeda clung to power with great difficulty. To stabilise the province, he organised another expedition to settle the Naco valley. He sent a captain with sixty soldiers south and intended to follow with reinforcements, but was delayed in Trujillo by reports of a Spanish expedition approaching along the coast from the west. The new arrivals were led by Alonso d' Ávila, one of the officers of Francisco de Montejo, who had been named adelantado of Yucatán. Ávila had been attempting to establish a Spanish town on the east side of the Yucatán Peninsula, but had been forced out by native resistance. Since the entire region was at war with the Spanish, Ávila was unable to return to Montejo, and instead forayed along the Caribbean coast in canoes, looking for a suitable location to establish a new settlement. By the time he reached Puerto de Caballos, his expedition was in a perilous state. Ávila appealed to Cerezeda for assistance, and the latter sent out supplies to the beleaguered party. Ávila and his men finally arrived in Trujillo in early 1533.

Ávila had plans to establish a settlement in Montejo's name near Puerto de Caballos, but knew it fell within the jurisdiction of Honduras, and that Cerezeda would never support such a move. In any case, the situation in Trujillo was too precarious for Cerezeda to support a major expedition. Ávila became embroiled in the factional politics of the town, taking the part of Diego Díaz de Herrera. After a time, he decided to leave Honduras, and took passage with the majority of his men on a ship that stopped at Trujillo, which took them back to Yucatán. A few of Ávila's men stayed and settled in Trujillo, where the situation continued to deteriorate.

=== Reorganisation as Honduras-Higueras, and licenses of conquest ===
In 1532, Pedro de Alvarado, governor of Guatemala, was issued with royal authorisation to conquer the general area of Higueras, in order to establish a Caribbean port for Guatemala. Less than a year after permission was given to Alvarado, then governor of Honduras and Higueras, Diego Alvítez, was given royal authorisation to pacify and colonise the Naco valley and the area around Puerto de Caballos. Soon afterwards, in 1533, Francisco de Montejo, governor of Yucatán, was granted governorship over a huge area extending from the Gulf of Mexico to the Ulúa River, Naco and Puerto de Caballos, so long as neither Alvarado nor Alvítez had established themselves in those regions. At the same time, Alvarado received reconfirmation of his permission to conquer those parts of Higueras that had not been pacified by the governors of Yucatán and Honduras-Higueras. Effectively, all three governors had royal permission to conquer and settle the same general region, and could interpret the royal authorisations as they chose.

In 1534, the Spanish Crown reorganised the area of Honduras into the Provincia de Higueras e Cabo de Honduras ("Province of Higueras and Cape of Honduras"). The western portion, from the Golfo Dulce, now in Guatemala, to the Ulúa Valley and Naco, was defined as Higueras; the eastern portion was Honduras, including Trujillo, the Valley of Olancho, and extending as far as Cape Camarón. Although organised as two territories, it effectively comprised one province, often referred to as Honduras-Higueras. In 1534, Honduras-Higueras was removed from the jurisdiction of New Spain, where it had been since the late 1520s, and returned to that of the Audiencia of Santo Domingo.

=== Cerezeda's move to Higueras, 1534 ===
Cerezeda finally set out with his expedition to the interior but was forced to return when Díaz de Herrera attempted to abandon Trujillo, taking all the colonists with him. Trujillo was now at the point of collapse; the Spanish lacked essential provisions, and although more Spanish soldiers had come to Honduras than were needed to overthrow Peru, the bitter Spanish infighting had resulted in the almost complete collapse of the colony. Trujillo was the only Spanish settlement left in the territory, and possessed less than 200 Spanish inhabitants. The Spanish assaults upon the native population had wreaked havoc upon them, but failed to successfully conquer any territory outside the immediate environs of Trujillo. The native population level collapsed, with many Indians being sold as slaves to supply the workforce on the plantations of the Caribbean islands. In 1533, an epidemic swept through the natives within the reduced Spanish area of control, killing half their number. The encomienda system was dysfunctional in the colony, with little tribute, and no rich mines of silver or gold. Many colonists had heard of the riches to be had in Peru, and threatened to leave. By 1534, the only richly inhabited native region left was the Naco valley; in desperation, Cerezeda once again planned to move the colony west to Naco.

In March 1534, Cerezeda left fifty Spaniards in Trujillo, and took the majority on his expedition into Higueras, some 130 men. He sent sixty mixed cavalry and infantry driving livestock overland, while Cerezeda travelled by sea with the rest. The two groups met at Naco, where they settled for some time. Eventually, lack of supplies forced them to move on, so they moved to the Sula Valley, inhabited by Maya. There they founded Villa de Buena Esperanza ("Town of Good Hope"). The new settlement was 23 leagues from Puerto de Caballos, seven leagues from Naco, and three leagues from the Maya town of Quimistan. Cerezeda sent exploratory raids into the surrounding countryside to subdue the natives, and search for precious metals. This westward thrust by Cerezeda shifted the focus of the Spanish colony from Trujillo to Higueras.

=== Cristóbal de la Cueva's incursion from Guatemala ===
At the same time as Cerezeda was establishing a new base of operations in the west, Cristóbal de la Cueva entered Honduras from Guatemala with 40 men, under orders from Jorge de Alvarado, brother of Pedro de Alvarado, who was acting as governor while Pedro was fighting in Ecuador. De la Cueva was looking to establish a suitable Caribbean port and a connecting road to Santiago de los Caballeros de Guatemala. Cerezeda intercepted the Guatemalan captain, and the two came to an arrangement whereby Cerezeda would take command of de la Cueva's detachment of soldiers, who would assist him in his efforts to explore and conquer the area around Buena Esperanza. In return, Cerezeda would establish the port and road inland to Santiago de Guatemala. The original plan was to reestablish either Puerto de Caballos or San Gil de Buena Vista, but de la Cueva changed his mind, and instead argued for a new inland colony, which was opposed by Cerezeda. De la Cueva's men became rebellious and refused to recognise Cerezeda's command, and de la Cueva abandoned Higueras and marched south to reinforce San Miguel (in modern El Salvador), near the Gulf of Fonseca. This brought San Miguel within the jurisdiction of Guatemala; Cerezeda considered it to be within the territory of Honduras-Higueras, and vociferously protested to the Crown. Jurisdiction over San Miguel remained a source of contention between Honduras and Guatemala for some years to come.

Cerezeda parcelled out the territory around Buena Esperanza in encomienda to his men, and gold and silver were discovered, to the delight of the colonists. Cerezeda planned to develop Buena Esperanza as a commercial hub, linking a route from the Caribbean and Spain to the Pacific and the wealth of the recently conquered Peru. The route would involve the resettlement of Puerto de Caballos; it was planned to pass through the Indian settlement of Maniani, which Cerezeda planned to develop as a trading centre, and onwards to the Gulf of Fonseca.

== Cicumba, lord of Ulúa ==
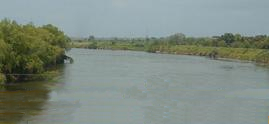
Ulúa River, Cicumba led several battles against the Spanish in this area.

In the mid 1530s, the natives of western Honduras resisted the Spanish incursions, their efforts were led by Cicumba (Note: Cicumba is also transcribed Coçumba, Ciçumba, Çoçumba, Zozumba, Soamba, Joamba, Socremba etc. His true name is unknown.) in the Ulúa Valley. Cicumba was the indigenous lord of an extensive and well-populated territory along the lower Ulúa River; he had a number of strong fortresses along the course of the river, and commanded many warriors. His centre of operations was his riverside fortress at Ticamaya. Cicumba headed an indigenous campaign that successfully limited Spanish activities in western Honduras for a decade.

Writing to the king of Spain in late August 1535, Andrés de Cerezeda reported that Cicumba had attacked Puerto de Caballos and killed a number of Spaniards there. The Spanish wife of one of the dead was seized by the Indians, and Cicumba took her as his woman. Cerezeda launched an attack upon Cicumba while Cristóbal de la Cueva was still in Higueras, and gained a victory, but Cicumba launched renewed resistance as soon as the Spanish left his territory, and began to organise regional indigenous resistance to the Spanish incursions.

== Decline of Higueras-Honduras ==
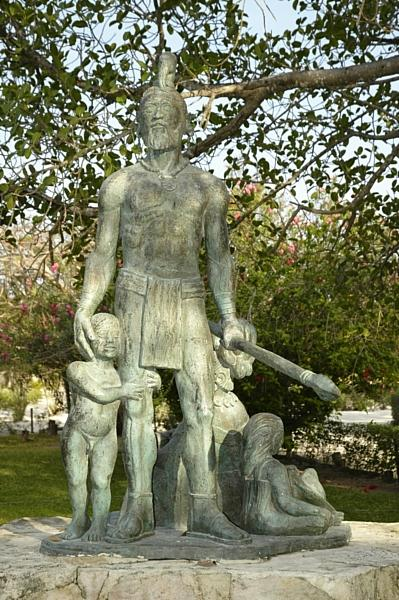
Gonzalo Guerrero died in Honduran soil after helping the indigenous people against the Spanish aggression.

After Andrés de Cerezeda took most of the inhabitants of Trujillo into Higueras, the city entered a period of serious decline. Those inhabitants that remained were too old, too sick, or too dispirited to head west. Basic supplies such as food and clothing were scarce. The citizens believed that Cerezeda wished to abandon Trujillo, and appealed to the Audiencia of Santo Domingo, and to the Crown, for supplies and a Crown-appointed governor.

In Higueras, Cerezeda became ill, and lacked the ability to provide strong leadership. He was unable to expand the conquered area, and the Spanish treated the indigenous population with customary harshness, resulting in population decline as the natives either succumbed to their ruthless treatment, or fled into the hills. The natives that remained were increasingly hostile, and refused to work for their encomendero overlords. This resistance crystallised around Cicumba; ever more indigenous warriors rallied to his cause, and areas that had been superficially conquered rose up in arms against the Spanish.

Areas that had previously fallen to the Spanish were lost, and they were encircled in a small region centred on Buena Esperanza. The colonists were demoralised, fearing a massive Indian attack at any moment, and were desperately short of provisions since the encomienda towns refused to supply them. The colonists openly questioned Cerezeda's leadership, and new factions formed, with treasurer Diego García de Solís leading the opposition. Rumours of the riches of Peru lured Spaniards away from the faltering colony in Honduras-Higueras, and forty or fifty men deserted in search of better fortune elsewhere. Although precious metals had been discovered close to Buena Esperanza, it was impossible to mine them due to the hostility of the Indians. In spite of Cerezeda's opposition, García de Solís appealed directly to the governor of Guatemala, Pedro de Alvarado, who had recently returned from Ecuador. Such was the desperate situation that García de Solís travelled personally to Guatemala with ten soldiers, leaving Buena Esperanza in October 1535, and arriving in Santiago de Guatemala in late November.

=== Abandonment of Buena Esperanza, 1536 ===
By December, there was still no word of García de Solís, nor had Spanish assistance arrived from any other direction, and the Spanish at Buena Esperanza had lost hope. They were pressed on all sides by hostile natives, with resistance led by Cicumba. Andrés de Cerezeda got word of a plan by Cicumba to assault Buena Esperanza and destroy it. In response he sent parties to seize and execute hostile Indian leaders, thus defusing the imminent threat, although Cicumba managed to escape.

Soon after this, a Mayanised Spaniard by the name of Gonzalo Guerrero arrived from Yucatán with fifty canoes of Maya warriors. Guerrero had been captured by the Maya in Yucatán, and had "gone native," fighting alongside the Maya. He now came to assist the Indian resistance in Higueras, although he arrived too late for the planned assault upon Buena Esperanza.

By 5 May 1536, the town council of Buena Esperanza had now lost all faith in Cerezeda and voted for the abandonment of Higueras and a return to Trujillo; Cerezeda opposed this decision, but the council forced him to sign off on the move. In the meantime, any party foraging outside of Buena Esperanza was ordered to consist of at least 20 members for defence from the hostile natives. A chaotic evacuation back to Trujillo began, and resentment against Cerezeda was such that he feared for his life and fled to Naco to seek refuge amongst friendly natives there. On 9 May, amidst this disordered Spanish retreat, García de Solís returned from Guatemala with news that help would soon be forthcoming.

== Pedro de Alvarado, 1536 ==
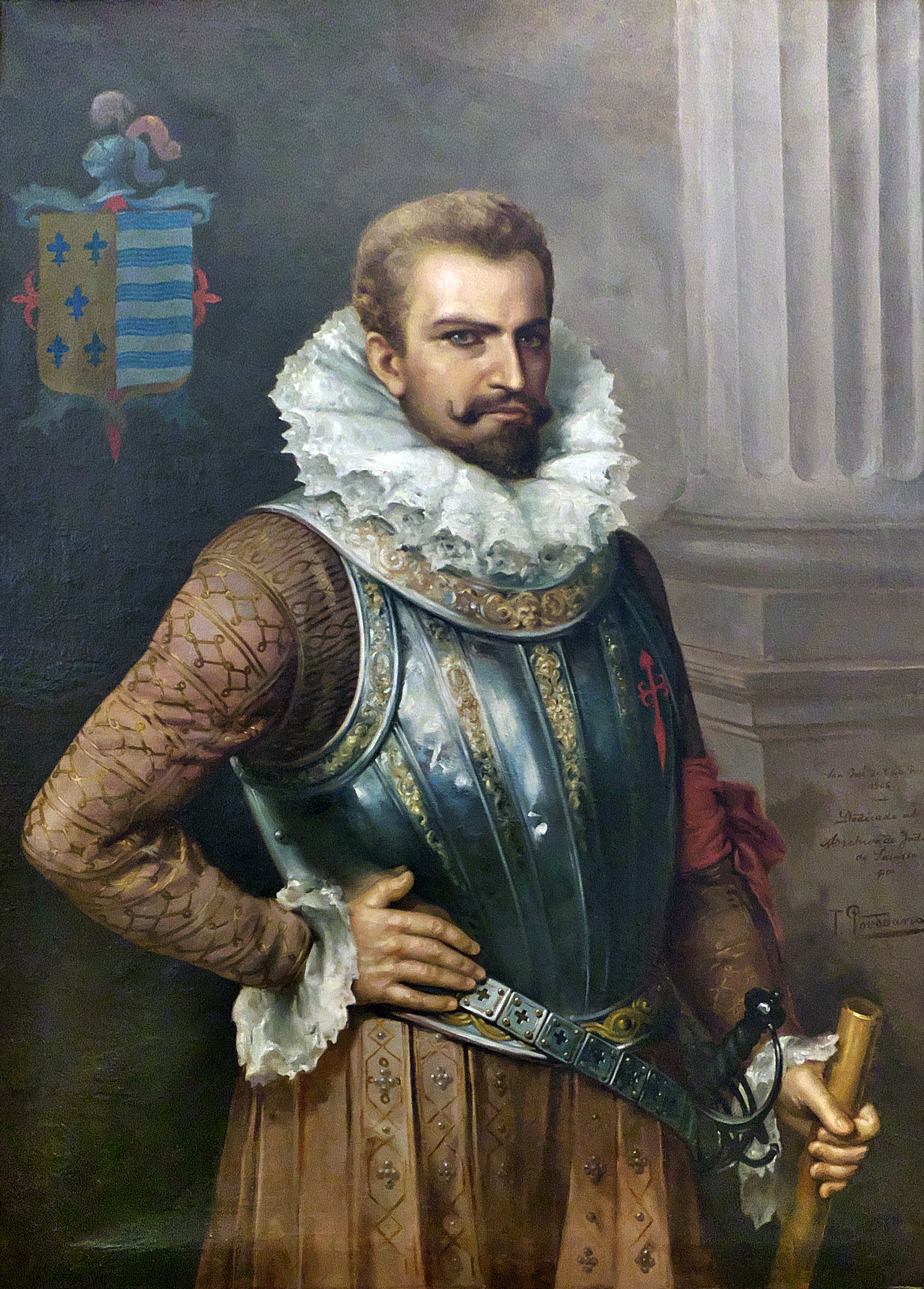
Pedro de Alvarado.

In this political instability, the colonists requested help from Pedro de Alvarado; Their request initiated a period of negotiations between Alvarado and Francisco de Montejo, which resulted in Montejo attempting to renounce his governorship claim over Honduras-Higueras in favour of Alvarado, and Alvarado considering the transfer of his own governorship of Chiapas to Montejo in exchange. Permission was sought from the Crown, which refused the exchange and required Montejo to take up his governorship of Honduras-Higueras. News of this refusal, due to the slow pace of communications with Spain, arrived after Alvarado launched his relief expedition.

Alvarado was attracted by reports of gold, and also wished to prevent the complete abandonment of the territory by the Spanish. He invaded Higueras in 1536, with 80 well-armed soldiers of mixed infantry and cavalry, accompanied by about 3,000 indigenous Guatemalan auxiliaries; Many of the auxiliaries were Achi Maya warriors with a particularly fearsome reputation. He also brought Indian and African slaves to work the mines, as well as livestock to assist the colonisation effort. His route took him past a strong native fortress called the Peñol de Cerquín, where native warriors had amassed to resist the Spanish. Alvarado, seeing the strength of the fortress and aware of the pressing need to relieve Buena Esperanza, decided not to storm the fortress and pushed onwards to assist his countrymen.

=== Consolidation of Higueras ===
Pedro de Alvarado arrived at Buena Esperanza in the middle of its abandonment. His sudden appearance halted the exodus, and many colonists who had already left returned. Andrés de Cerezeda sent messages from Naco, imploring Alvarado to take over as governor of the province. The town council joined in session and installed Alvarado as justicia mayor (chief judge), and as captain-general of Honduras-Higueras until the Crown appointed someone else, or confirmed him in his post. Alvarado's presence turned Spanish morale around overnight. The factions that had plagued the colonial government dissipated, and the colonists rallied around the new governor. Alvarado, known to the natives by his Nahuatl nickname Tonatiuh, had a fearsome reputation amongst the indigenous population, who had heard of his ruthless exploits elsewhere. Alvarado rapidly reestablished firm Spanish control over the area around Buena Esperanza and founded a military encampment in Tencoa. He successfully established profitable gold and silver mines in Higueras.

Once this was done, Pedro de Alvarado sent Juan de Chávez, one of his trusted officers, at the head of 40–50 Spanish soldiers and some 1,500–2,000 native auxiliaries to explore the mountainous interior of the province, and find a good, defensible location for a new colonial capital, ideally to provide a communication route between Higueras and Guatemala.

=== Defeat of Cicumba ===
The natives of the Sula Valley, led by their cacique Cicumba, put up fierce resistance against Alvarado's forces. Alvarado marched to the lower reaches of the Ulúa Valley to put an end to Cicumba's resistance once and for all. Cicumba was confident in the strength of a fortress he had built on the banks of the Ulúa River, and in the abilities of his warriors, reinforced by the Maya warriors brought by Gonzalo Guerrero to assist him. These Maya allies were probably from Chetumal, in Yucatán, where Guerrero had settled. Alvarado launched a dual assault by land and water against the fortress, supported by indigenous Guatemalan auxiliaries and by artillery. The fighting took place both around the walls of the fortress, and on canoes in the river. Attempts to storm the landside wall failed, and Alvarado's assault succeeded by the use of canoe-mounted artillery attacking from the river.

Alvarado won a decisive victory over the native leader. Cicumba and many of his nobles and warriors were captured, and native resistance was broken. Gonzalo Guerrero was found amongst the dead, wearing Maya-style clothing and warpaint. Cicumba's army dispersed, and Alvarado launched a campaign against a series of native fortresses, which fell to the invading force in rapid succession. In a relatively brief span of time, Alvarado established Spanish control over the entire littoral plain. After the battle, Alvarado divided the territory and its inhabitants in encomienda; he took Ticamaya for himself. Cicumba and his people converted to Christianity and became Spanish subjects; Cicumba settled in Santiago Çocumba in the south of the Ulúa Valley (modern Santiago, in Cortés Department). Cicumba's resistance was at an end after ten years of successful campaigning against Spanish incursions. Alvarado brutally suppressed native resistance; his merciless treatment of the indigenous population only served to fuel their hatred of the invaders.

=== Establishment of San Pedro Sula, June 1536 ===
Coat of Arms of San Pedro Sula.

After defeating Cicumba, Alvarado led his army to the Indian village of Choloma, in the general region of Puerto de Caballos. On 27 June 1536, Alvarado founded a Spanish town beside the Indian settlement, with the name of Villa de Señor San Pedro de Puerto Caballos (modern San Pedro Sula). The new town had 35 Spanish citizens, and Alvarado allocated 200 of his slaves to help build the new town and work the surrounding fields. He sent out expeditions into outlying regions to secure the new town, extend the area of Spanish domination, and commandeer supplies. Alvarado annulled all encomienda rights established in the area under Cerezeda, and reassigned the villages to the citizens of San Pedro.

=== Juan de Chávez at the Peñol de Cerquín ===
While Alvarado was consolidating his power in the Ulúa Valley, Juan de Chávez's expedition in southern Higueras had met stiff resistance. They had marched up the Naco valley to the Peñol de Cerquín ("Rock of Cerquín"), which had been bypassed by Alvarado on his initial incursion. The Peñol de Cerquín was a formidable rocky butte that had been fortified by the natives. A great number of Indians had amassed at the fortress, which dominated the whole of southern Honduras. The natives were entrenched in the fortress, and determined to resist any Spanish attempt to pass. It is not known who led the indigenous resistance at this time, but it may well have been Lempira, a war leader who would later distinguish himself against the invading Spanish.

Juan de Chávez attempted to storm the Peñol de Cerquín, but was unable even to advance to its base. He therefore decided to lay siege to the fortress but was short of supplies, since the local Indians were all gathered in resistance, and there were none left to provision the Spanish. Spanish morale was low, since the difficulty of storming the fortress was obvious, and most of the Spanish soldiers had homes and encomiendas in Guatemala, and wished to return to them. After a time, Chávez was forced to withdraw by the mutinous rumblings of his troops. He planned to find an easier victory to boost morale, and to resupply before returning to assault the fortress. He also considered that his withdrawal would allow the hostile Indians to farm their fields around the Peñol de Cerquín, which would provide food when he later returned to renew the assault.

=== Preparations to found Gracias a Dios, July 1536 ===
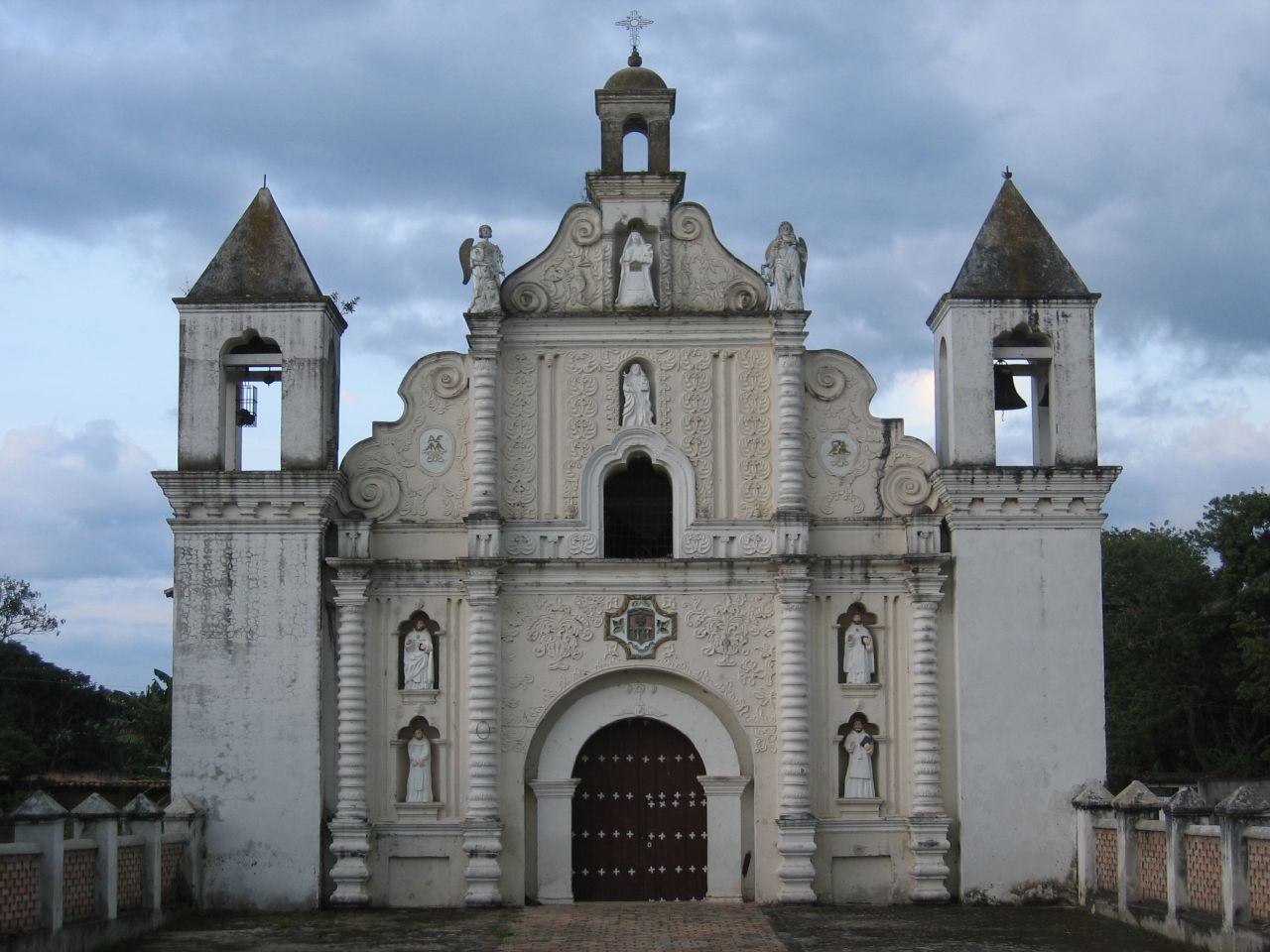
Baroque church of La Merced in the city of Gracias.

Juan de Chávez headed for the Valley of Maniani, which had been proposed by Cerezeda as a good place for a new town. It is likely that the Spanish chose the Indian town of Maniani as the location for the new Spanish settlement. On 20 July 1536, Pedro de Alvarado sent instructions to found the new city, to be called Gracias a Dios, to provide better communication between Honduras and Guatemala. Alvarado used the town of Tencoa as a base of operations, and sent his brother Gonzalo with 40 Spanish soldiers, and an unspecified number of indigenous allies, to help establish the new town. Alvarado appointed the members of the town council, and assigned 100 Spanish citizens to inhabit it. The natives around Gracias a Dios where not completely subjugated, however, and there were violent indigenous rebellions in the province until around 1539. As at San Pedro, Alvarado annulled all previous encomiendas in the region and reassigned them. Gonzalo de Alvarado had been exploring the central region around Siguatepeque, the Tinto River and Yoro, successfully dealing with native resistance and collecting supplies for San Pedro. He had about a dozen cavalry and fifteen or so infantry under his command, and joined up with ten more soldiers under Gaspar Suárez de Ávila, who was to serve as his lieutenant. They proceed to Gracias a Dios with the legal documentation establishing its formal existence.

=== Departure for Spain, August 1536 ===
In 1536 the natives of Yamala, near Tencoa, rebelled; the Spanish responded by burning the Indians' homes and storehouses. Around the middle of 1536, Pedro de Alvarado received news that Alonso de Maldonado had been appointed to investigate his governorship of Guatemala, and that Francisco de Montejo had finally accepted governorship of Honduras and was en route. Alvarado was incensed, as his decisive intervention had prevented the complete collapse of the Spanish colonisation efforts in the territory, and he now believed the Spanish position to be secure. With Spanish control apparently firmly established in Honduras, he travelled to Puerto de Caballos and sailed back to Spain to deal with his legal difficulties. He left the province in mid-August.

=== Founding of Gracias a Dios ===
Meanwhile, Gonzalo de Alvarado and his soldiers pushed south to meet Juan de Chávez. They were already exhausted from their previous expeditions; both men and horses were in poor shape, and supplies were a constant worry. Their progress was further hindered by the onset of the rain season, and the constant resistance of hostile natives. After three or four months, Gonzalo de Alvarado arrived at Lepaera, where they were expecting to find Chávez and his men. Unable to locate them, Alvarado sent out his lieutenant Suárez de Ávila to scout the surrounding area. At length he returned with news that Chávez, faced with the threat of mutiny by his men, had marched back to Guatemala. Since Pedro de Alvarado had already left for Spain, this left Gonzalo as the highest-ranking Spanish officer in Honduras-Higueras.

Gonzalo de Alvarado and his men decided to remain; the area was apparently well-populated enough to provide worthwhile tribute, and the existence of precious metal deposits in the region had already been established by earlier forays. Alvarado decided to found the new town of Gracias a Dios at Opoa, rather than at the nearby site that had been set aside by Chávez. In late 1536, Gonzalo de Alvarado finally founded the new town, assigning officials as had been designated by his brother. Although 100 citizens had been assigned by Pedro de Alvarado, in reality it had about 40 upon its foundation. The town only remained at Opoa for a brief period, before it was transferred to a new site. Gonzalo and his men campaigned to impose their control over a wide area, penetrating as far as the Comayagua valley. Although claiming conquest of a wide region, Gonzalo had too few soldiers to effectively control it. Native resistance was such that the colonists were soon threatened by starvation, and the natives refused to serve the Spanish. San Pedro was in a similar situation, and was unable to provide any kind of relief to Gracias a Dios. The colonists appealed to Alonso de Maldonado in Guatemala for assistance, and were informed that Francisco de Montejo would soon be taking up governorship, and would provide any assistance necessary.

== Interim decline, 1536–1537 ==
Pedro de Alvarado's subjugation of Honduras proved superficial, and largely limited to Higueras. His conquest of the Naco valley and the lower Ulúa River firmly established a Spanish presence there, but beyond that Spanish control was fragile. Expeditions had penetrated deeply across Honduras, and distant native rulers had come to offer homage to the Spanish Crown. The settlement at Gracias a Dios was not as secure as it had appeared when Alvarado left, and no effective assistance had been sent to Trujillo. Many native rulers, who had been cowed by Alvarado's formidable reputation and military skill, rose in rebellion as soon as he left the province. Alvarado had also encouraged the enslavement of natives that fought against the Spanish, and their subsequent sale, as well as general harsh treatment of the indigenous population; this produced considerable resentment among the Indians, and left them susceptible to rebellion. Many natives resisted passively, by not providing supplies or labour to their encomenderos. Continued slave raids, and ferocious treatment at the hands of the Achi Maya auxiliaries increased their hatred and resistance, and many Indians abandoned their settlements and fled to the mountains and forests. The greater part of the districts of San Pedro and Gracias a Dios were at war, and the Spanish position was again precarious.

== Francisco de Montejo ==
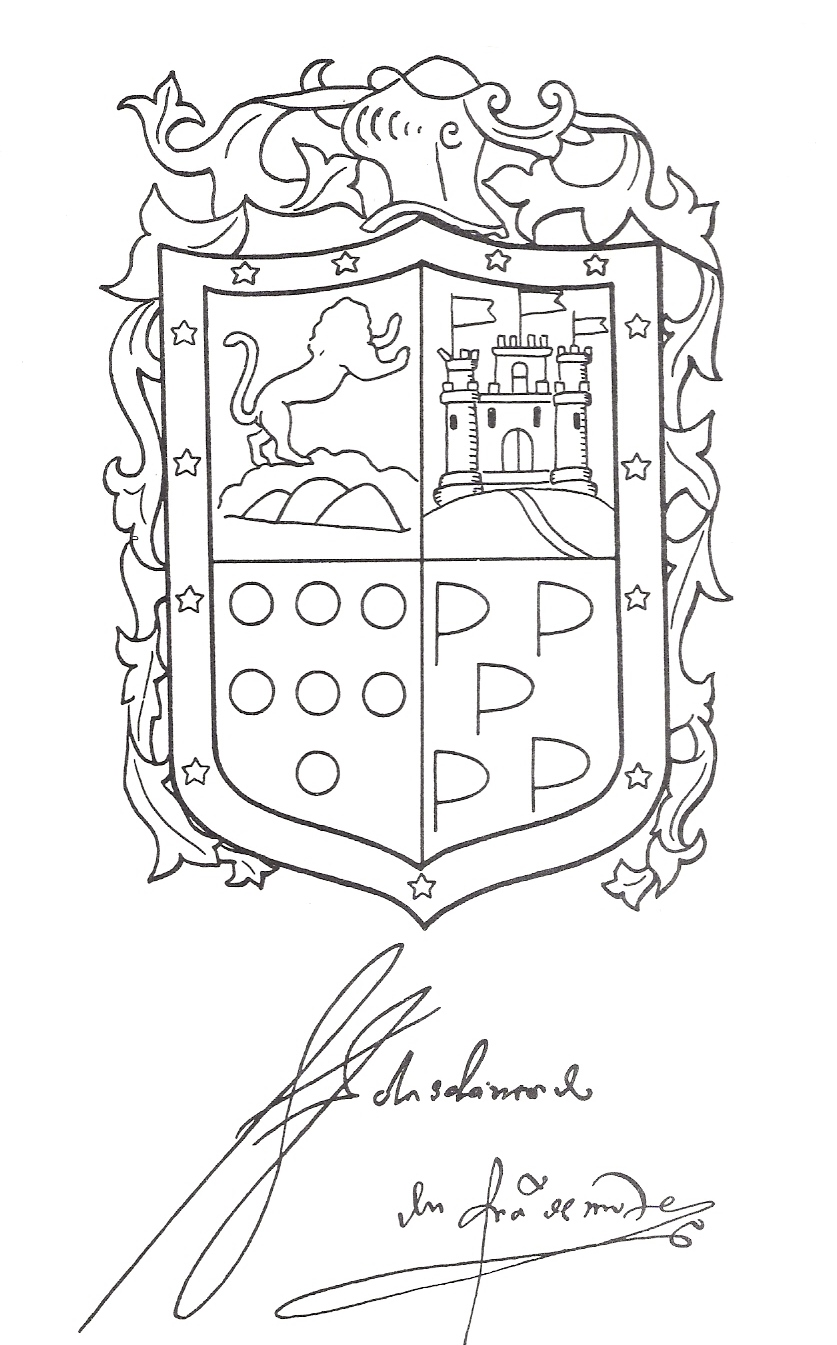
Coat of Arms of Francisco de Montejo.

Francisco de Montejo meanwhile borrowed heavily to finance his expedition to Honduras, offering his extensive holdings in Mexico as guarantee on the loans, as well as selling some of his property outright. He announced his expedition in Mexico City and in Santiago de Guatemala, and attracted large numbers of recruits, whom he equipped often at his own cost. Additionally, he purchased ships at Veracruz. In 1537, Francisco de Montejo took up the post of governor, and annulled those encomiendas distributed by Pedro de Alvarado. This resulted in Alvarado's supporters resisting Montejo and his appointees. Montejo assigned Alonso de Cáceres as his captain in Honduras.

=== Alonso de Cáceres, 1536–1537 ===
While Francisco de Montejo was preparing his considerable expedition, he received news of the precarious position of the Spanish in Higueras. Fearing the collapse of the colony, he appointed Alonso de Cáceres as captain-general, and sent him ahead with a small detachment of soldiers, to make his way overland via Santiago de Guatemala, recruiting more soldiers en route. Cáceres was an experienced officer, who had already fought in the conquest of Yucatán. In Santiago, Cáceres recruited a further 20 cavalry, and acquired additional arms and supplies. He arrived in Gracias a Dios with his relief force in late November or early December 1536, and described the settlement as being in a deplorable state. His expedition gave temporary respite, and morale was improved with the news that Montejo would soon be in Honduras. However, there was some political resistance to Cáceres from the town council, appointed by the Alvarados, which wished to see Pedro de Alvarado continue as governor, and Honduras unified with Guatemala, and factional plotting ensued.

Since Alvarado's supporters had been confirmed in the town council of Gracias a Dios, and used obscure legalistic arguments to refuse Cáceres' authority, he withdrew to a nearby Indian village and plotted to overthrow the town council. The Spanish infighting encouraged the local Indians in their defiance of the invaders. Cáceres launched a coup at dawn early in 1537, entered Gracias a Dios with twenty well-armed soldiers and imprisoned the town council, including Gonzalo de Alvarado. Cáceres declared Montejo as governor of Honduras-Higueras, and named himself as lieutenant governor and captain-general. He met little opposition from the majority of the Spanish citizens, and appointed a new town council.

Cáceres left Gracias a Dios under the command of Suárez de Ávila, and launched punitive expeditions against the emboldened native resistance. He penetrated the mountainous region of Cares, around the Peñol de Cerquín, and was moderately successful against fierce indigenous resistance. He penetrated eastward to the Comayagua valley and brought an extensive region under nominal Spanish control.

=== Montejo arrives in Higueras, March 1537 ===
Francisco de Montejo travelled overland from Mexico with his considerable expedition, which included soldiers, Mexican auxiliaries, provisions and livestock; he sent a smaller detachment by sea, with additional supplies as well as his family and household. He arrived in Santiago de Guatemala early in 1537, where he purchased more provisions, arms, and livestock, and recruited more soldiers. The new provisions included cattle, sheep and pigs, crossbows, arquebuses, and gunpowder. He now had between 80 and 100 Spanish soldiers, including veterans of Yucatán. He arrived in Gracias a Dios towards the end of March 1537, while Cáceres was still in the Comayagua valley. The seaborne detachment fared less well; after resupplying in Cuba, it was plundered by pirates with little loss of life, but most of the provisions were taken. With what could be salvaged, they put into Puerto de Caballos in the spring of 1537, where there were met by Montejo. The strong combined Spanish force now in Honduras-Higueras placed Montejo in a solid position, both militarily and politically. Montejo was installed as governor without opposition on 24 March at Gracias a Dios. He released the imprisoned members of the former town council, and sought their support for continued conquest.

Montejo immediately sought to curb the worst excesses of the Spanish, and impressed upon the colonists the need to treat the natives fairly, and within the law. He sent many of the Achi Maya auxiliaries back to Guatemala due to their depredations among the generally peaceful Chontal Maya of the Sula littoral. The moderation of Montejo's actions encouraged considerable numbers of natives to return to their villages, especially around Gracias a Dios, and the encomienda system began to function as was intended, which greatly alleviated the constant struggle for provisions.

=== Conquest of the north ===
Montejo then set out to pacify the north coast, leaving Suárez de Ávila commanding Gracias a Dios. He first went to San Pedro to present his formal documents of governorship. He was recognised as governor on 16 April, and the following day he annulled all encomiendas issued by Pedro de Alvarado in both the district of San Pedro and in that of Gracias a Dios; he then re-partitioned the province to his own soldiers and supporters. Montejo then sent Alonso de Reinoso with about a hundred soldiers into the mountains around San Pedro to put down native resistance. Montejo marched to Naco, where previous campaigns by Cerezeda and Alvarado had left a large indigenous population dispersed from their settlements and hostile to the encroaching Spanish. Victory was rapid, and many native rulers came to swear allegiance to Montejo. They implored him to protect the trade route to Yucatán, and offered their loyalty in return. Montejo accepted their supplications, and considered a large stretch of the north coast to be at last conquered, and under effective Spanish control. He applied the same moderate treatment to the natives that had been so successful around Gracias a Dios, with similar results; many returned to their villages and the encomienda system began to function.

=== Founding of Santa María de Comayagua ===
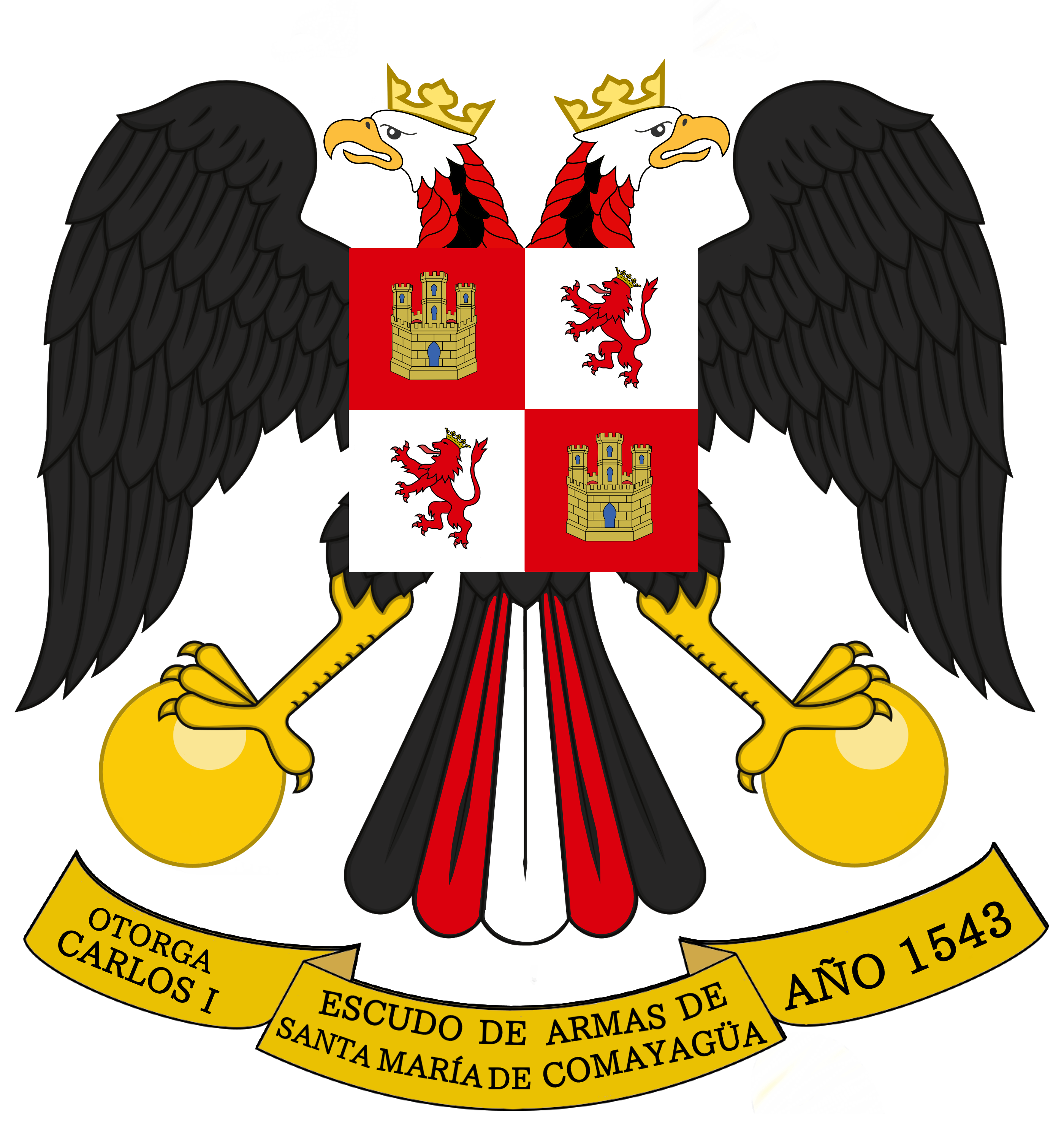
Coat of arms of Comayagua.

In spring 1537, Francisco de Montejo sent reinforcements to Alonso de Cáceres, who was still in the fertile Valley of Comayagua. By late spring or early summer, the valley had been completely conquered. In December 1537, under orders from Montejo, Alonso de Cáceres founded the town of Santa María de Comayagua; it was sited in a strategic position half-way between the Caribbean and Pacific coasts. Cáceres then distributed the Indian settlements in encomienda. He collected reinforcements from Gracias a Dios, then returned immediately to Comayagua, and began to push eastwards towards Olancho.

By summer 1537, Montejo believed that Higueras had been almost completely pacified, with very few casualties amongst either the Spanish or the natives. Gracias a Dios and San Pedro were more secure, and many Indians had returned to their villages, encouraged by Montejo's moderate policies. In reality, only the areas around the Spanish settlements had been thoroughly conquered, and in the remoter areas the vast majority of the natives were still hostile to the Spanish, and determined to resist. In contrast to other provinces, the Spanish were unable to recruit reliable native auxiliaries to assist their conquest.

=== Great Revolt, 1537–1539 ===
In a sign of problems to come, three Spaniards passing through a region near the Peñol de Cerquín were attacked and killed. This area was considered pacified, and the attack deeply disturbed Montejo, since similar incidents during his conquest of Yucatán had been a prelude to general uprisings. He rushed to the scene of the attack with a strong force, and summoned all the native leaders to meet him, in an effort to forestall rebellion. He investigated the attack and meted out punishment to the most guilty, then continued with conciliatory policies towards the rest of the leaders, who reaffirmed their loyalty. Montejo let the leaders return to their people, then marched to Comayagua to reinforce Cáceres, before returning to Gracias a Dios.

==== Lempira's alliance ====
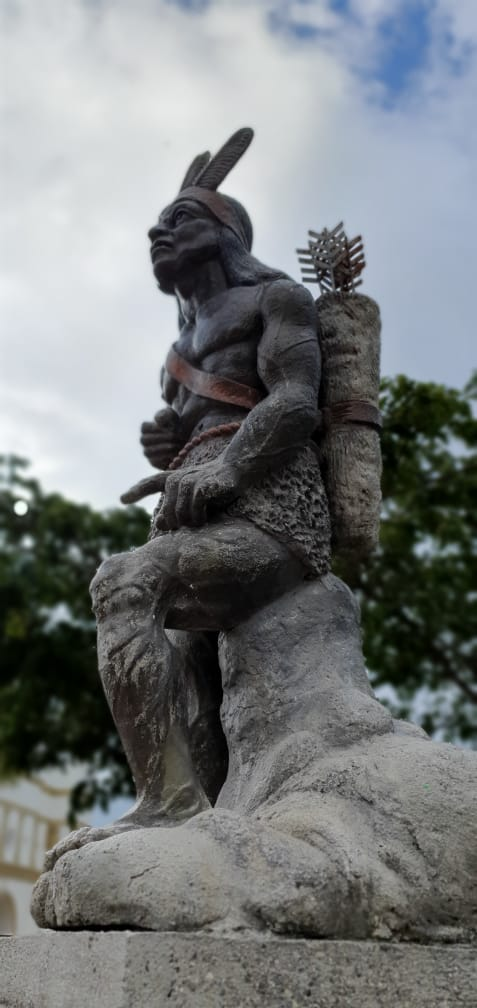
Statue of the Lenca ruler, Lempira.

After Pedro de Alvarado's brutal suppression of western Honduras, indigenous resistance against the Spanish had coalesced around the Lenca warleader Lempira, (Note: Not his real name. Lempira translates as "Lord of the Mountain".) who was reputed to have led an army of 30,000 native warriors. Lempira had been quietly building a powerful alliance in southern Higueras, in the mountains south of Gracias a Dios. Its political centre was at the town of the Lenca ruler Entepica, and its greatest stronghold was Lempira's hilltop fortress at Peñol de Cerquín. Lempira also attracted support from the native inhabitants in the Comayagua valley, and the San Pedro mountains. Even former enemies of Lempira, such as the Cares, swore allegiance to him after he overcame them in battle; through a mixture of force and diplomacy, Lempira's alliance extended as far as San Miguel, in eastern El Salvador, and encompassed some 200 towns. Resistance continued from 1537 into 1538, until Lempira and his forces were defeated in battle by the Spanish, led by Alonso de Cáceres.

Spanish expeditions had frequently crossed Lempira's territory, particularly the Cares region, and they believed it to be pacified. In secret, Lempira planned an uprising near his stronghold at Peñol de Cerquín, and if it were successful, to follow it with a widespread revolt across his entire territory. Lempira strengthened the fortifications of the Peñol de Cerquín, and gathered large numbers of warriors, provisions, and weapons there. Hardened Spanish veterans of the European wars were struck by the strength of the fortifications, and favourably compared them with those they had seen in Europe. Towards the end of 1537, Lempira was ready. Natives abandoned their villages and gathered at the Peñol de Cerquín, and his warriors prepared for battle. Lempira sent messages to the native auxiliaries of the Spanish, exhorting them to abandon their foreign overlords and join his forces, but they refused. It was only with the declaration of war that the Spanish became aware of the threat presented by Lempira and his alliance. Although the immediate threat was limited to the region close to the Peñol de Cerquín, the Spanish realised that the rebellion at such a strong fortress was a powerful symbol of native independence throughout Higueras. Francisco de Montejo immediately dispatched Alonso de Cáceres against Lempira with 80 well-armed Spanish soldiers, accompanied by Mexican and Guatemalan Indian auxiliaries. Montejo sent messengers requesting assistance from Santiago de Guatemala and San Salvador.

==== Siege at the Peñol de Cerquín ====
On 1 November 1537, Alonso de Cáceres arrived at the Peñol de Cerquín. He immediately sent envoys to Lempira, requesting his submission; Lempira executed the envoys and declared his defiance. In response, Cáceres launched a direct assault against the fortress but found it impregnable. No roads climbed the mountain, and sheer wall prevented attempts to climb it. Well-engineered defences manned by large numbers of gathered warriors prevented the Spanish from storming the approaches, and horses were useless on the steep terrain. Cáceres had no choice except to lay close siege to the Peñol de Cerquín. He divided his men equally amongst the eight approaches to the fortress, and fierce fighting ensued, in which five Spaniards were killed and many were injured, including Cáceres. The siege held firm, but was unable to gain any ground.

==== General uprising ====
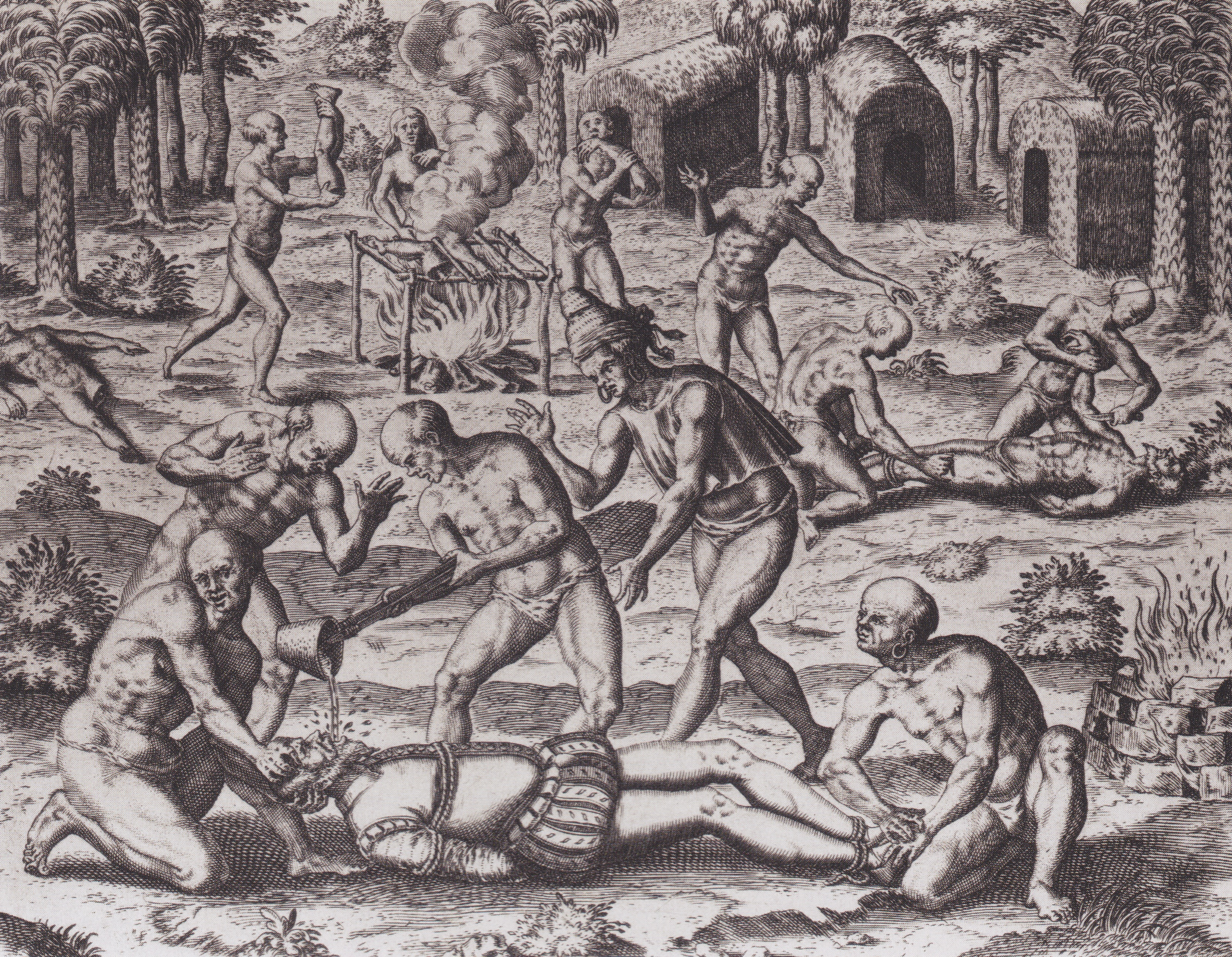
The mistreatment by the encomenderos caused a rebellion of the natives against the Spanish.

While Alonso de Cáceres was engaged in what would evidently be a lengthy siege, Francisco de Montejo sent a column of Spanish soldiers into the area around Gracias a Dios; he sent a second column, with 20 Spaniards accompanied by native auxiliaries, south to the Valley of Xocorro. Montejo led a third column in person, taking 23 Spanish soldiers to Comayagua. He also sent a message ahead, for Santa María de Comayagua to send support to Cáceres at the Peñol de Cerquín, and fourteen soldiers marched from there to join the siege. The Xocorro column was forced to return to Santa María de Comayagua after falling afoul of the Spanish authorities in San Miguel, who claimed they were infringing upon their jurisdiction.

About two months into the siege of the Peñol de Cerquín, the majority of Spanish soldiers in Honduras were concentrated around the fortress. Small groups were scattered elsewhere, and both Gracias a Dios and Santa María de Comayagua were dangerously vulnerable, with almost no soldiers left there. Seeing the vulnerability of the Spanish positions across the greater province, Lempira declared a general uprising. The whole region south of the Peñol de Cerquín rose up, as well as neighbouring parts of El Salvador around San Salvador and San Miguel, where they caused serious damage to the Spanish. The Comayagua Valley joined the revolt, as did the mountain regions around San Pedro Sula, and outlying areas around Trujillo.

The column of sixteen Spaniards retreating from Xocorro were ambushed at Guaxeregui and killed to a man. The only survivor of the expedition was a seriously wounded African slave. The reinforcements sent from Comayagua to the Peñol de Cerquín were also attacked in Cares, and had to fight their way through to join the Spanish at the Peñol de Cerquín, suffering considerable hardship. The citizens of Santa María de Comayagua appealed to Francisco de Montejo for help, and he sent a dozen mixed cavalry and infantry, who managed to break through the hostile natives encircling the settlement, and reinforce the town, where they were cut off from further Spanish assistance. Montejo was left with only eleven soldiers, and returned to Gracias a Dios to protect the colonists there, who included women and children. The Indians killed isolated Spaniards wherever they could find them. The natives, seeing the success of their fortress at Cerquín, started construction of a similar fortress near Gracias a Dios, and gathered a great quantity of supplies in storehouses there. Montejo urgently needed to halt their progress, but was unable to attack directly. Instead, he sent an African servant who managed to set the storehouses ablaze. The dismayed Indians of that district then sued for peace. A local Indian ruler called Mota plotted to attack Gracias a Dios, but the plan was betrayed to Montejo. In a lightning raid, Mota was seized and taken back to Gracias a Dios as a prisoner, only to escape and resume his plans for an assault. Montejo eventually discovered his hiding place and launched another rapid raid, and kept him hostage in Gracias a Dios under close guard as guarantor of his people, thus defusing the immediate threat against Gracias a Dios.

The natives launched a furious mass assault against Santa María de Comayagua. The depleted garrison fought its way out under cover of night and set out on a desperate march to Gracias a Dios, leaving the town to be sacked – not even the livestock were spared. All across the province the Spanish were short of soldiers, arms and supplies, except at the Peñol de Cerquín, which remained the focus of Spanish attention. In a very short period of time, Spanish control had collapsed across Honduras; only two small Spanish pockets remained – at Gracias a Dios and San Pedro Sula. Francisco de Montejo sent Gonzalo de Alvarado to San Salvador to seek assistance, which was readily supplied in the form of 100 Indian auxiliaries, 1,000 Indian carriers, livestock, arquebuses, crossbows, gunpowder, ammunition, shields, spears, armour and iron. Further supplies were forthcoming from San Miguel, but similar requests sent to Guatemala were largely rebuffed, as a response to Montejo's policies which were perceived as undermining the rights of Guatemalan colonists.

==== Death of Lempira and the fall of the Peñol de Cerquín, 1538 ====
The siege at the Peñol de Cerquín dragged on for months, with constant fighting. The Spanish there numbered about a hundred, plus auxiliaries, but were unable to maintain supply lines through the surrounding hostile territory, and were often short of food. The seasonal rains that arrived in spring 1538 only added to their hardship. The supplies from El Salvador finally arrived, and Alonso de Cáceres slowly gained territory around the Peñol de Cerquín. After six months, Cáceres invited Lempira to a parley. Lempira arrived, dressed in full regalia, cotton armour, and plumed headdress, accompanied by a retinue of nobles.

Cáceres sent a mounted soldier to request his surrender, and when Lempira refused, a carefully hidden arquebusier shot him through the head. This was a signal for an all-out surprise attack by the Spanish. The Indians responded with complete panic at the death of their leader, and the Spanish onslaught swiftly took the fortress without any Spanish loss of life, although some were wounded. A portion of the indigenous garrison retreated to nearby mountains, but most of the Indians surrendered without further resistance, including a great many women, children and elderly. Cáceres followed Francisco de Montejo's instructions in dealing with the defeated natives with moderation. He followed native custom and sent gifts of textiles and fowls to the native leaders, as a symbol of peace, accompanied by a spear as a promise of war should they refuse to submit. After a council, the Indian leaders accepted peace, and the region passed immediately under Spanish control. Cáceres released all his prisoners to return to their villages, a move that surprised the natives, who had expected harsh punitive measures. The fall of Lempira's stronghold was followed by the speedy capitulation of a wide area of Honduras, and came at a critical juncture for the Spanish, when they had been at the point of losing the province.

==== Continued resistance in the Valley of Comayagua ====
Francisco de Montejo followed up on the victory at Penõl de Cerquín by sending two companies of soldiers to the Comayagua valley, under the command of Suárez de Ávila and Alonso de Reinoso. He sent more soldiers into the mountainous regions around San Pedro Sula, and personally commanded forays around Gracias a Dios to eliminate any isolated pockets of resistance there. The campaign in the Comayagua valley proved difficult; the Spanish were hindered by the broken terrain, while the natives were still determined to resist and had established fortified mountaintops in a similar fashion to the Peñol de Cerquín. In spite of supplies provided by Montejo, food was scarce, and it was difficult to replenish their stocks locally in the face of native hostility. The Indians launched fierce assaults from their fortresses, then would retreat to their mountain-tops, raining showers of arrows and boulders upon the attacking Spanish.

Cavalry were nearly useless in the difficult terrain, and the Spanish were forced to resort to foot soldiers supported by light artillery. In response to the difficulty of the campaign, the two Spanish expeditions under Ávila and Reinoso joined into a combined force. Cáceres had now returned to Gracias a Dios from the Peñol de Cerquín, so Montejo sent him to Comayagua with a strong detachment of soldiers and plentiful supplies. Although the campaign in the Comayagua valley drew on into 1538 without a decisive victory, the Spanish were able to reestablish the town of Santa María de Comayagua.

==== Stabilisation of Honduras-Higueras ====
First coat of arms of Honduras given by the Emperor Charles V of the Holy Roman Empire and 1st of Spain.

While prolonged fighting continued in Comayagua, the west and the north were now considered almost completely pacified. Francisco de Montejo encountered no serious resistance as he brought the San Pedro mountains and the Ulúa and Naco valleys back under Spanish control, and Spanish soldiers were sent back south to Xocorro. A functioning encomienda system was rapidly reestablished. Alonso de Cáceres was making little headway in the Comayagua valley and appealed to Montejo for reinforcements. In late 1538, Montejo himself set out with all the soldiers he could muster, supported by 1,500 native auxiliaries drafted from the defeated defenders of the Peñol de Cerquín. Montejo passed through Guaxeregui, where a Spanish column had been massacred at the beginning of the general uprising.

The Indians there had fortified themselves in a mountaintop town and still did not accept Spanish dominion. Although the fortress was formidable, a show of force on Montejo's part was sufficient for the demoralised natives to flee without a fight. Meanwhile, Cáceres had laid siege to another mountaintop fortress, known as the Peñol de Ojuera, in the northwest of the Valley of Comayagua. His victory there was decisive, and afterwards native leaders throughout the central region came to offer peace. Cáceres then joined Montejo; their combined force consisted of about 100 Spanish soldiers, plus native auxiliaries. This force was now sufficiently strong and well-equipped that no native army could resist them, and the conquest of the Comayagua valley proceeded swiftly. With Spanish control established there, Montejo travelled south to reinforce the expedition in the Xocorro valley, which was rapidly pacified. Montejo passed into the San Miguel district of El Salvador, and assisted in the ongoing conflict there. By early 1539, the campaign had been won in Comayagua, and Honduras-Higueras was once again under Spanish control. The fighting around Trujillo had been ended with reinforcements sent from Higueras.

In 1539, the fledgling colonial town of Villa de Señor San Pedro de Puerto Caballos was moved three leagues to the south and was given the new name of San Pedro de Puerto Caballos. At this time it consisted of just twelve palm-thatched houses imitating the native style of construction; in 1541 it had 35 Spanish residents. Montejo also moved Santa María de Comayagua to a more suitable location and assigned 35 conquistadors as its citizens. Rich silver deposits were soon found there.

Francisco de Montejo turned his attention east to Olancho, which had never been successfully conquered in spite of numerous earlier expeditions. Montejo marched there with his men, while sending messages requesting support from Andrés de Cerezeda and García de Solís, the royal treasurer, but they refused and Montejo was forced to retreat back to Santa María de Comayagua. By 1539, the power struggle between Francisco de Montejo and Pedro de Alvarado drew the attention of the Council of the Indies; as a result Alvarado once again became governor of Honduras. Alvarado returned to Honduras in April 1539; Montejo travelled to Gracias, where he was forced to concede the governorship, and then left for Chiapas.

== Olancho and the east in the 1540s ==
Indigenous resistance was stubborn, and Francisco de Montejo did not complete the conquest of western and central Honduras until 1539. Once he had established Spanish control there, he headed east to pacify the Olancho Valley. Although the conquest of the west and centre of the territory was difficult, and the natives were well organised, resistance in the east took much longer to put down, and rebellions there lasted throughout the colonial period.

The Spanish found the town of San Jorge de Olancho, probably in 1540, on the bank of the Olancho river close to Pech territory. Throughout the 1540s, the inhabitants of the mining district of Olancho launched revolts against their harsh treatment by their Spanish overlords, with notable uprisings occurring in 1542, 1544, and 1546. The greatest of these was the rebellion of 1544, which coincided with rebellions in Comayagua, San Pedro Sula and Nueva Segovia, and may have been an attempt to relaunch the coordinated resistance of the 1530s.

== Founding of colonial Tegucigalpa ==
The native settlement of Tegucigalpa was first recorded by the Spanish in 1536. Spanish miners founded colonial Tegucigalpa in 1578, having headed south from Comayagua and discovered silver and other minerals in the mountains to the east of the native settlement. The colonial town was established as a real de minas, an administrative centre for controlling the mines, and where the ore was smelted. The town was in a bowl-shaped valley on the upper Choluteca River, close to the convergence of three tributary streams. Spanish Tegucigalpa was next to Comayagüela, which remained a purely indigenous settlement. Thanks to the local mineral wealth, Tegucigalpa grew rapidly in size as it attracted Spanish settlers and their native workers. The Franciscans established a convent there by 1592, and the Mercedarians established their own convent about four decades afterwards.

== Province of Taguzgalpa ==
Flag of Tegucigalpa.

By the end of the 16th century, eastern Honduras was still beyond the frontier of conquest. The region was known as Taguzgalpa, stretching from Trujillo in the north, to the valleys of Olancho, Jamastran and Agalta in the west, to the Guayape and Guayambre rivers in the south, and the Caribbean Sea in the east. The territory was well populated by a diverse range of indigenous peoples, including Lencas, Nahuas and Misumalpas. The exact political composition of the territory was unknown to the Spanish, such that the Spanish Crown prohibited campaigns of conquest and reduction in Taguzgalpa owing to ignorance of its makeup.

The earliest known account of the unconquered region of Taguzgalpa is a letter to the king sent by Cristóbal de Pedraza, first Bishop of Honduras, in 1544. He travelled east across the mountains from Trujillo with local allies, and spoke to the Nahua-speaking indigenous inhabitants he found there. These claimed that the capital of the province was a town of the same name, famous for its gold smelting industry. The bishop explored no further, and three follow-up expeditions became lost in the difficult terrain. The region appeared to have no permanent settlements, which hindered Spanish methods of conquest, and it gained a reputation for being a "land of war" inhabited by savages.

The task of incorporating eastern Honduras into the Spanish Empire fell to the evangelising efforts of Spanish missionary orders. The earliest Franciscan missionaries, at the beginning of the 17th century, attempted to convert the natives in their own settlements. It soon became obvious that this was impractical, given the paucity of available missionaries, and the wide dispersal of Indian villages and towns. The friars changed their tactics, and gathered the natives in mission towns, known as reducciones.

== Setbacks in the 17th century ==
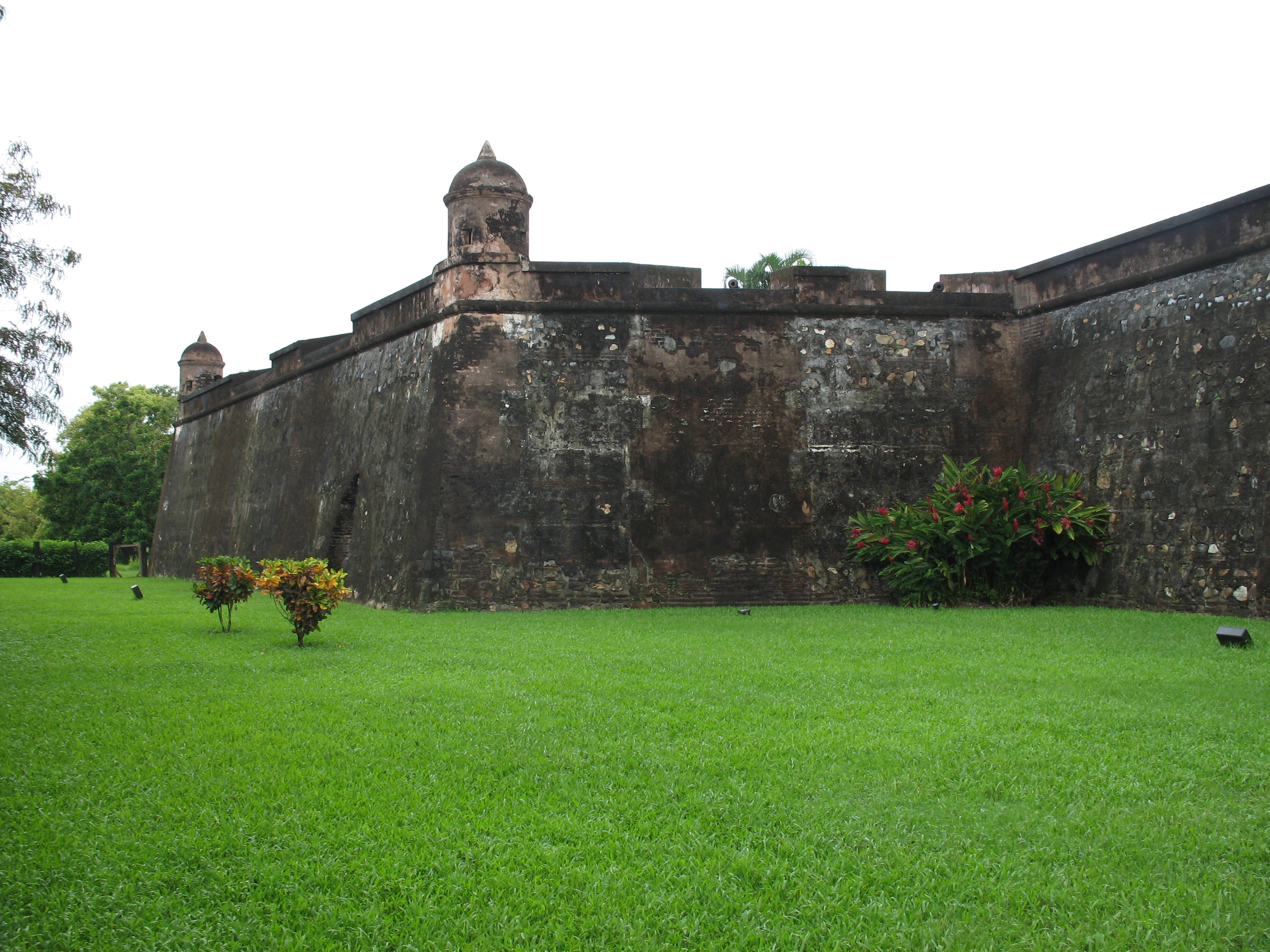
The fortress of San Fernando de Omoa was built to resist pirates attacks.

San Pedro de Puerto Caballos (modern San Pedro Sula) was connected to Puerto de Caballos by a well-established royal road (camino real). By the end of the 16th century, pirates were plaguing the Caribbean coastline. In 1595, they attacked Puerto de Caballos, and followed the road southwards to burn San Pedro as well. Soon after 1600, Puerto de Caballos was all but abandoned by the Spanish, and a new port was established at Santo Tomás de Castilla on the Amatique Bay, in Guatemala. By the middle of the 17th century, both San Pedro and Puerto de Caballos were in serious decline, with the sea under pirate control, and the near-extinction of the indigenous workforce.

== Historical sources ==
Christopher Columbus wrote his own account of his fourth voyage, as did his son Ferdinand, who travelled with him. Bishop Cristóbal de Pedraza wrote a Relación that he dated 18 May 1539; it described the unsettled conditions in the newly established province. Gonzalo de Alvarado produced his Probanza on 19 July 1555, also describing the general instability of the region of what is now western Honduras. Hernán Cortés described his expedition to Honduras in the fifth letter of his Cartas de Relación. Bernal Díaz del Castillo described Cortes' expedition to Honduras in his Historia verdadera de la conquista de la Nueva España ("True history of the conquest of New Spain"), which he completed some 40 years after the campaigns it describes. Chronicler Gonzalo Fernández de Oviedo y Valdés' Historia general y natural de las Indias, isla y tierra firme del Mar Océano ("General and Natural History of the Indies, island and mainland of the Ocean Sea") gives a detailed account of the events in Honduras to 1536, as does Antonio de Herrera y Tordesillas in his Historia general de los hechos de los Castellanos en las islas i tierra firme del Mar Océano ("General History of the deeds of the Castilians in the Islands and Mainland of the Ocean Sea"). As well as the accounts of the chroniclers, there is an important body of legal documents, probanzas de mérito (proofs of merit), dispatches and other records stored in the Archivo General de las Indias (General Archives of the Indies) in Seville, Spain, and in the Archivo General de Centroamérica (General Archives of Central America) in Guatemala City. These include a great body letters and documents pertaining to the lawsuits between Pedro de Alvarado and Francisco de Montejo, dating to 1539–1541. Francisco de Montejo's letter to the king of Spain, dated 10 June 1539, includes an account of the siege of the Peñol de Cerquín, the subsequent conquest of Comayagua, and the battle of Temanpua.

== See also ==
- Spanish conquest of El Salvador
- Spanish conquest of Nicaragua
