= Battle of Tacuzcalco =

1524 battle

- Part of the Spanish conquest of El Salvador
Date	13 June 1524
Location	Tacuzcalco in modern El Salvador
Result	Spanish victory

Belligerents
Spanish Empire; Mexican and Kaqchikel auxiliaries	Cuzcatlan

Commanders and leaders
Pedro de Alvarado; Jorge de Alvarado; Gómez de Alvarado	Atlácatl

Strength
200 Spaniards; 5,000–6,000 auxiliaries	Thousands

Casualties and losses
Unknown	Unknown

The Battle of Tacuzcalco was a battle on 13 June 1524 fought between a Spanish army under the command of conquistador Pedro de Alvarado and Cuzcatlan fighters under Atlácatl.

== Background ==
In June 1524, Spanish conquistador Pedro de Alvarado embarked on an expedition into modern day El Salvador with the intention of conquering the land for the Spanish Empire. On 8 June 1524, Alvarado fought and defeated Cuzcatlan fighters under Atlácatl at the Battle of Acajutla.

== Battle ==
On 13 June 1524, Alvarado engaged Atlácatl in a second battle at Tacuzcalco. Atlácatl's army was larger than the army he commanded at Acajutla and Alvarado stated that seeing the size of Atlácatl's was "terrifying." Following the battle, Alvarado described the outcome as a "great massacre" and "punishment" of the Pipil warriors.

== Aftermath ==
After the defeat at the hands of the Spanish, the Pipil refused to engage the Spanish in open battle, instead resorting to guerrilla tactics to fight the Spanish. After further campaigning, Alvarado and his men returned to Guatemala in July 1524.

== Bibliography ==
- Arce, Escalante; Antonio, Pedro (2001). "Los Barrios de los Mexicanos en El Salvador" [The Mexican Neighborhoods in El Salvador]. Los Tlaxcaltecas en Centro América [The Tlaxcaltecas in Central America] (in Spanish) (1 ed.). San Salvador: Dirección de Publicaciones e Impresos and the Consejo Nacional para la Cultura y el Arte. pp. 115–137. OCLC 1036658730.
- Fowler Jr., William R. (1993). "Chapter 11 – The Living Pay for the Dead – Trade, Exploitation, and Social Change in Early Colonization Izalco, El Salvador". In Rogers, J. Daniel; Wilson, Samual M. (eds.). Ethnohistory and Archaeology: Approaches to Postcontact Change in the Americas. New York: Plenum Press. pp. 181–188. ISBN 0-306-44176-4.
