= Alvarado family =

Alvarado was the Spanish family of conquistadors.

1. Pedro Gómez de Alvarado y Mexía de Sandoval. the Commander of municipalities including Lobón, Montijo and Cubillana, Alcalde of Montánchez, Trece of the Order of Santiago, a Maestresala official instructor of Henry IV of Castile, General of the Frontier of Portugal and Lord of Castellanos. 1st wife: Teresa Suárez de Moscoso y Figueroa; 2nd wife Leonor de Contreras y Gutiérrez de Trejo. His sons:
  1. Pedro de Alvarado, famous conquistador. 1st wife Fransisca de Cueva, 2nd - her cousin Beatriz de la Cueva. Both childless. But more so than his wives his vital companion was Luisa de Tlaxcala (also called Xicoténcalt or Tecubalsi, her original names after Catholic baptism), an Indigenous noblewoman, daughter of the Tlaxcaltec Chief Xicotenga. With Luisa de Tlaxcala he had three children, and two more from other women (Leonor de Alvarado y Xicotenga Tecubalsi, Pedro de Alvarado, Diego de Alvarardo El Mestizo, Gómez de Alvarado, Ana (Anita) de Alvarado)
  2. Gonzalo de Alvarado y Contreras. His descendants were represented by the family Vides de Alvarado after the famous 17th-century historians Francisco Antonio de Fuentes y Guzmán and also the father Domingo Juarros y Montufar.
  3. Jorge de Alvarado. Jorge married a daughter of Xicotencatl I, the ruler of Tizatlan in Tlaxcala. She was baptized with the Spanish name doña Lucía. They had a daughter who married the conquistador Francisco Xiron Manuel and had issue. Also he married twice, firstly to Francisca Girón and secondly in 1526 to Luisa de Estrada, certainly related to Francisco Vázquez de Coronado's wife, by whom he had a son Jorge de Alvarado y Estrada, born in México, who married Catalina de Villafañe y Carvajal, Mexican, daughter of Ángel de Villafañe, conqueror of Mexico, and wife Inés de Carvajal. Their son was Jorge de Alvarado y Villafañe, also born in Mexico, Governor and Captain-General of Honduras and Knight of Santiago since 1587, also married twice, firstly to Brianda de Quiñones and secondly to Juana de Benavides, vecina of Guatemala, and had issue.
  4. and Gómez, Hernando and Juan.
- Diego de Alvarado y Mexía de Sandoval, uncle of Pedro de Alvarado.
- Gonzalo de Alvarado y Chávez, cousin of Pedro de Alvarado. He married Isabel, a daughter of Jorge de Alvarado, his cousin.
- Alonso de Alvarado - ?

== Ancestors ==
Ancestors of Pedro de Alvarado y Contreras

16. Fernando Sánchez or Sánz del Varado
8. Garci Sánchez de Varado or de Alvarado
17. María González de Aguilar
4. Juan de Alvarado
18. Alvaro Dávila
9. Leonor de Bracamonte
19. Juana de Bracamonte
2. Diego Gómez de Alvarado y Mexía de Sandoval
20.
10.
21.
5. Catalina Mexía y Sandoval
22.
11.
23.
1. Pedro de Alvarado y Contreras
24.
12. Fernán Núñez de Contreras or Fernando Martínez de Contreras, el Viejo
25.
6. Gonzalo de Contreras y Carvajal
26. Alvar García de Bejarano or de Orellana, Señor de Orellana la Nueva
13. Sarra or Sara de Carvajal
27. Mencía González de Carvajal
3. Leonor de Contreras y Gutiérrez de Trejo
28. Gutierre González de Trejo, 7. Señor de Grimaldo, Almofraque y Carchuelas
14.
29. Violante Gutiérrez de la Cerda
7. Isabel Gutiérrez de Trejo y Ulloa
30.
15.
31.

== See also ==
- Alvarado wrestling family - Mexico City based family of professional wrestlers.
