= Gómez de Alvarado =

16th-century Spanish conquistador

Capitán Gómez de Alvarado
- Born: Gómez de Alvarado y Contreras; 1482; Badajoz, Crown of Castile
- Died: September 1542 (aged 59–60); Vilcashuamán, Viceroyalty of Peru
- Military career
- Allegiance: Spanish Empire
- Service years: 1510–1542
- Nickname: El Viejo
- Conflicts: Spanish colonization of the Americas: Conquest of the Aztec Empire; Conquest of Guatemala; Conquest of El Salvador; Conquest of the Inca Empire †

Gómez de Alvarado y Contreras (Spanish pronunciation: [ˈɡomeθ ðe alβaˈɾaðoj konˈtɾeɾas]; 1482 – September 1542) was a Spanish conquistador and explorer. He was a member of the Alvarado family and the older brother of the famous conquistador Pedro de Alvarado.

Alvarado participated in the Spanish colonization of the Americas beginning in 1510. He held the rank of captain of the cavalry and served in the Spanish campaigns against the Aztec Empire, the Maya in Guatemala and El Salvador, and the Inca Empire. He founded the Peruvian city of Huánuco in 1539 and died of an illness shortly following the Battle of Chupas in 1542.

== Early life and family ==
Gómez de Alvarado y Contreras was born in 1482 in Badajoz, Extremadura, Crown of Castile. He was a member of the Alvarado family, a notable Spanish family of conquistadors. His parents were Gómez de Alvarado y Mexía de Sandoval and Leonor Contreras Carvajal y Gutiérrez. His siblings were Jorge (b. 1460), Pedro (b. 1485), Sarra (b. 1485), Juan (b. 1490), and Gonzalo (b. 1490). Alvarado married Bernardina de Frias and fathered two children: Isabel and Ana.

== Campaigns in New Spain ==
Alvarado left Extremadura for Spanish America in 1510 with his brothers Jorge, Pedro, and Gonzalo, their uncle Diego de Alvarado y Mexía de Sandoval, and their cousins Hernando, Diego, and Gonzalo. They served under Hernán Cortés during the Spanish conquest of the Aztec Empire.

On 6 December 1523, Pedro led his brothers, cousins, and uncle, including Gómez, out of Tenochtitlan in command of a Spanish army consisting of 120 horsemen with 170 horses, 300 foot soldiers, and 130 crossbowmen to what is modern-day Guatemala, beginning the Spanish conquest of Guatemala that would last well into the 17th century. Pedro was known for his cruelness and ruthlessness during his conquest of Guatemala, and the same attributes were shared by his brothers, including Gómez. Atrocities, such as massacres, looting, village burning, rapes, and kidnapping indigenous people for slave labor, were commonly committed by their men.

By the end of 1524, Pedro, Jorge, and Gómez began the conquest of Cuzcatlan in modern-day El Salvador. In the Battle of Tacuzcalco, Alvarado commanded twenty cavalrymen against the left flank of the indigenous army under Atlácatl. During the conquest, the city of San Salvador was founded on 1 April 1525 at the current site of Ciudad Vieja with Diego de Holguín as the city's first mayor. The city was refounded on 1 April 1528 at its modern-day location and Diego de Alvarado, Alvarado's nephew, became its mayor.

== Campaigns in Peru ==
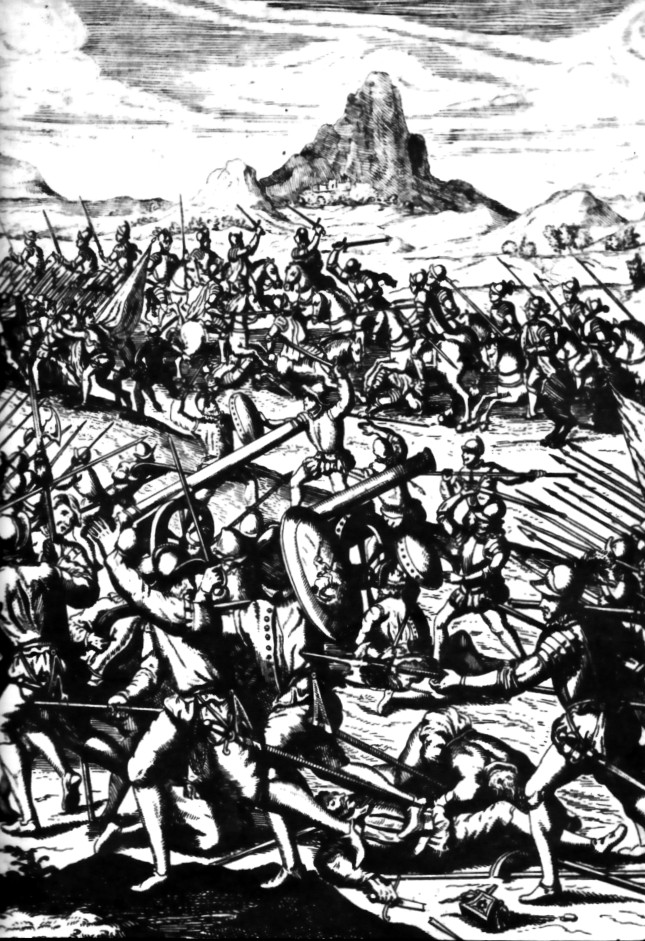
A depiction of the Battle of Chupas

In 1532, Pedro left New Spain to join Francisco Pizarro in the conquest of the Inca Empire and Gómez joined him in 1534 after serving as mayor of San Salvador from 1532 until 1534. Alvarado served under Diego de Almagro in an expedition to Chile. Alvarado commanded 90 cavalrymen in the Spanish victory at the Battle of Reinogüelén against Mapuche forces under Michimalonco in September 1536.

When civil war erupted between forces under Pizarro and Almagro in 1537, Alvarado sided with Almargo under the banner of Nueva Toledo against Pizarro's Nueva Castile. He participated in the Almagrist victory at the Battle of Abancay on 12 July 1537 and was captured during the Almagrist defeat during the Battle of Las Salinas on 6 April 1538. He refused to surrender his sword to a Spaniard, and instead gave it to an African slave. After Almagro was executed, Alvarado received a pardon from Pizarro and later founded the Peruvian city of Huánuco in 1539. The city was abandoned and refounded in 1541 and later received the title of "Very Noble and Very Loyal" by the Spanish Emperor Carlos I in 1543.

Pizarro was assassinated on 26 June 1541 on orders of Diego de Almagro II in revenge for executing his father in 1538. The assassination sparked a second civil war where Cristóbal Vaca de Castro sought to regain full control of Spanish Peru from Almagro who also sought to control the territory. The armies of Almagro and Vaca de Castro engaged at the Battle of Chupas with Alvarado serving under Almagro. The Almagrists were defeated in battle; Almagro fled but was later captured and executed, suffering the fate of many other captured Almagrists who were hanged by Vaca de Castro's forces.

Alvarado evaded capture by Vaca de Castro following the battle, but he was taken ill with a fever shortly after the battle. His health deteriorated and he died a few days after the battle in September 1542 in the town of Vilcashuamán. His body was transferred to Huamanga and he was buried in the local parish. Since his death, Alvarado has been confused with another Gómez de Alvarado, who is nicknamed "el Mozo," to distinguish him from Alvarado who is nicknamed "el Viejo."

== See also ==
- Diego de Almagro
- Pedro de Alvarado
- Spanish colonization of the Americas
- Spanish conquest of the Inca Empire

== Bibliography ==
- Arce, Escalante; Antonio, Pedro (2001). "Los Barrios de los Mexicanos en El Salvador" [The Mexican Neighborhoods in El Salvador]. Los Tlaxcaltecas en Centro América [The Tlaxcaltecas in Central America] (in Spanish) (1 ed.). San Salvador: Dirección de Publicaciones e Impresos and the Consejo Nacional para la Cultura y el Arte. pp. 115–137. OCLC 1036658730.
- Asselbergs, Florine (2004). Conquered Conquistadors: The Lienzo de Quauhquechollan, A Nahua Vision of the Conquest of Guatemala. Mesoamerican Worlds: From the Olmec to the Danzantes. University Press of Colorado. ISBN 978-0870818998. JSTOR j.ctt46nv6j.
- Cañas Dinarte, Carlos (18 June 2016). "Los Guanacos de Gómez de Alvarado y Contreras" [The Guanacos of Gómez de Alvarado y Contreras]. El Salvador.com. El Salvador. p. 1.
- Castejón, Antonio (2004). "Alvarado – Los Alvarado de Extremadura, que Pasan a América" [Alvarado – The Alvarados of Extremadura, that passed to America]. Euskalnet.net (in Spanish). p. 1.
- García Añoveros, Jesús María (June 1987). Don Pedro de Alvarado: Las Fuentes Históricas, Documentación, Crónicas y Bibliografía Existente [Don Pedro de Alvarado: The Historical Sources, Documentation, Chronicles and Existing Bibliography] (PDF). Mesoamérica (in Spanish). Vol. 13. Antigua Guatemala, Guatemala: El Centro de Investigaciones Regionales de Mesoamérica. pp. 243–282. ISSN 0252-9963. OCLC 7141215.
- García Granados, Jorge (1924). Libro Viejo de la Fundación de Guatemala y Papeles Relativos a D. Pedro de Alvarado [Old Book of the Foundation of Guatemala and Relative Papers to D. Pedro de Alvarado]. Biblioteca Goathemala de la Soc de Geografía y Historia; v. XII (in Spanish). Vol. 12. Guatemala City, Guatemala: Tipografía Nacional. pp. 1–14.
- MacQuarrie, Kim (2007). "The Last of the Pizarros". The Last Days of the Incas. New York City, United States: Simon & Schuster Paperbacks. pp. 331–352. ISBN 978-0-7432-6049-7.
- Mariño de Lobera, Pedro (1970). "Capítulo VI – De la entrada ......Gómez de Alvarado......descubrir lo que había en la Tierra adentro y de una sangrienta batalla que tuvo con los bárbaros" [Chapter VI - From the Entrance ...... Gómez de Alvarado ...... Discover what was in the Inland and a Bloody Battle he had with the Barbarians]. Crónica del Reino de Chile [Chronicle of the Kingdom of Chile] (in Spanish). Santiago, Chile: Universitaria, Santiago de Chile. pp. 25–26. ASIN B0026S67H4.
- Matthew, Laura E.; Oudijk, Michael R., eds. (2007). "Whose Conquest? Nahua, Zapoteca, and Mixteca Allies in the Conquest of Central America". Indian Conquistadors. Indigenous Allies in the Conquest of Mesoamerica. Norman, Oklahoma: University of Oklahoma Press. pp. 102–126. ISBN 978-0-8061-3854-1.
- Recinos, Adrián (1986). Pedro de Alvarado, Conquistador de México y Guatemala [Pedro de Alvarado, Conquistador of México and Guatemala] (in Spanish) (2 ed.). Guatemala City, Guatemala: CENALTEX. OCLC 243309954.
- Rújula y Ochotorena, José; Solar y Taboada, Antonio. "Los Alvarado en el Nuevo Mundo" [The Alvarados in the New World]. Boletín de la Academia de la Historia (in Spanish): 292–294.
