= Nahulingo =

Nahulingo Distrito de Nahulingo
- Municipality
- Location in El Salvador
- Coordinates: 13°42′19″N 89°42′53″W
- Country: El Salvador
- Department: Sonsonate Department

Area
  - Total: 13.68 sq mi (35.42 km^{2})
- Elevation: 646 ft (197 m)

Population (2007)
  - Total: 10,417
  - Density: 761.7/sq mi (294.1/km^{2})
- Time zone: UTC-6 (Central Standard Time)

Nahulingo is a local district in the municipality of Sonsonate Centro in the Sonsonate department of El Salvador. According to the 2007 Housing and Population Census, it has a population of 10,417 people.

Until the 30th April 2024, it was a municipality, but with the municipal reorganization approved in June 2023, it became a district.

== History ==
The population of this town is of Pipil origin; and before the conquest it was one of the two halves of the city-state of Tacuzcalco (both halves being separated by the Ceniza River), the other half being the town (today in ruins) where the battle of Tucuzcalco would take place.

During the colonial period it belonged to the province of Izalcos (later called the mayor's office of Sonsonate) and in 1770 it was a town attached to the parish of Caluco. Between 1821 and 1823, together with the entire mayor's office of Sonsonate, it belonged to the province of Guatemala, and in 1824 it was incorporated into the department of Sonsonate. By 1859 its population was estimated at 495 inhabitants.

On March 21, 1901, the National Legislative Assembly, at the proposal of the Executive Branch, decreed the extinction of the towns of Sonzacate, San Antonio del Monte, and Nahulingo. The Municipality of Sonsonate received through inventory the archives, furniture, accounts and stocks in kind and money of the towns, which would be governed and ruled as neighborhoods of the city, and all the properties of the municipalities of the extinct towns became the property of that of Sonsonate. The decree was approved by President Tomás Regalado on March 23 and published in the Official Gazette on March 28. On March 28, 1905, the National Legislative Assembly issued a legislative decree that reestablished the neighborhoods of San Antonio del Monte, Nahulingo and Sonzacate as towns; the Municipality of Sonsonate delivered to the respective municipalities the corresponding furniture, archives and documents. The decree was sanctioned by President Pedro José Escalón on the same day, March 28.
