= Diego de Holguín =

Spanish conquistador and mayor

1st Lieutenant Governor of San Salvador
- In office 1 April 1525 – 1 April 1528
- Preceded by: Position established
- Succeeded by: Diego de Alvarado

Personal details
- Born: 1486 Spain
- Died: 1556 (aged 69–70)
- Occupation: Conquistador

Military service
- Allegiance: Spain
- Battles/wars: Spanish colonization of the Americas: Conquest of Guatemala; Conquest of El Salvador

Diego de Holguín (1486 – 1556) was a Spanish conquistador and the first mayor of San Salvador, serving from 1525 to 1528. He participated in the conquest of many nations in the Caribbean islands, Central America and Mexico, where he became famous for his courage.

== Biography ==
Diego de Holguín was born around 1486 in a Spanish town called Tona or Sona. He arrived in the Americas very young and settled in the Spanish colony in present day Dominican Republic in 1506. There, he participated in the foundation of the cities of Aragua, Puerto Real, and Ciudad de la Vega.

Holguín participated in the conquest of Guatemala and El Salvador under the command of Pedro de Alvarado. He was alderman of the municipality of Santiago de los Caballeros de Guatemala. Along with Gonzalo de Alvarado, was one of the founders of the first settlement of San Salvador, next to a fortress Cuzcatlecos, and became its first mayor in April 1525, serving until April 1528. The city he founded, now known as Ciudad Vieja, was later refounded in the location where San Salvador currently is located.

Óscar Romero freeway was originally to be called Diego de Holguín.
