= Battle of Acajutla =

1524 battle during the conquest of the region of El Salvador

- Part of the Spanish conquest of El Salvador
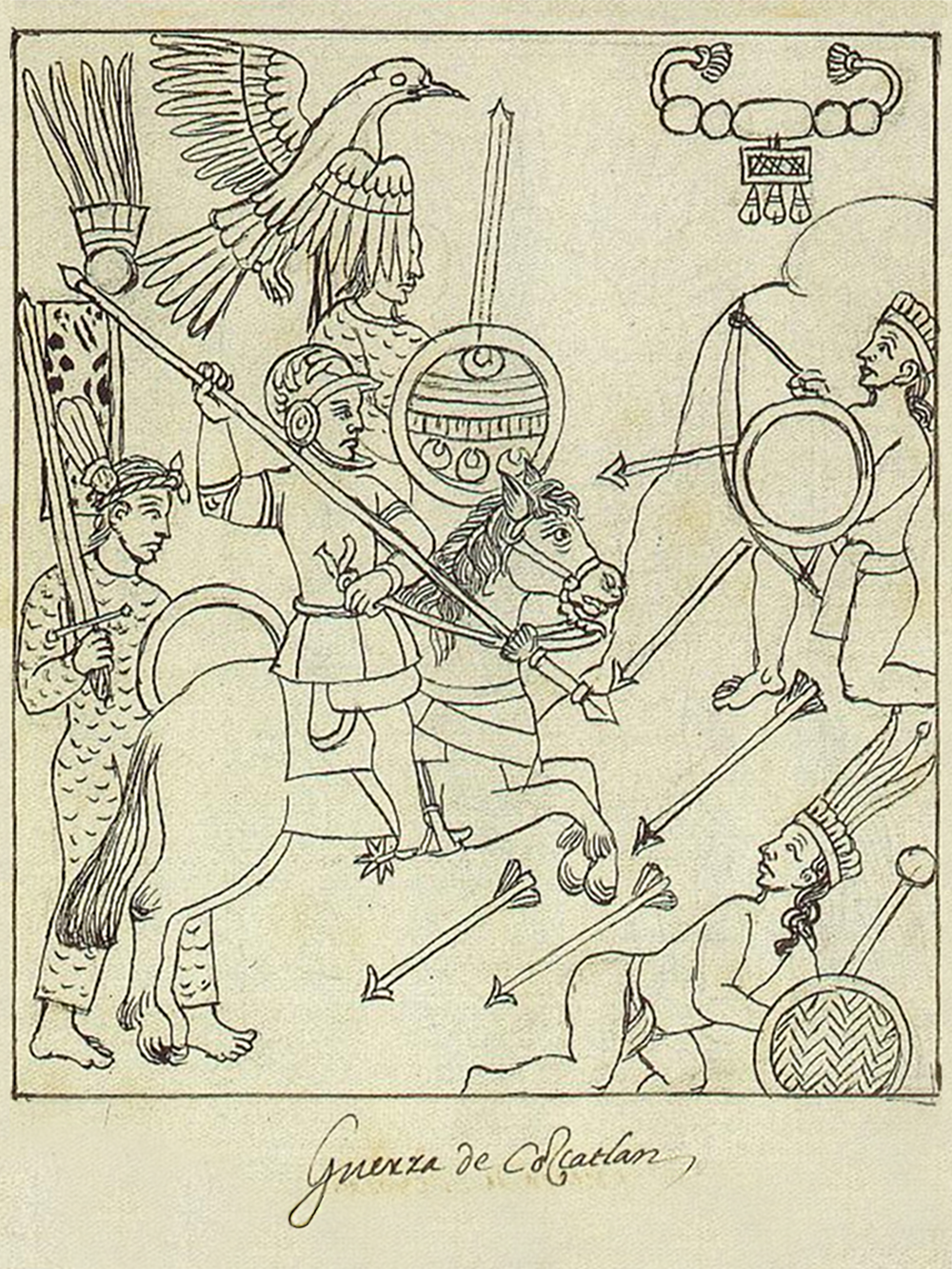
- Depiction of a battle between Spaniards and their allies, against Pipil warriors.
Date	8 June 1524
Location	Acajutla in modern day El Salvador
Result	Spanish victory

Belligerents
Spanish Empire; Mexican and Kaqchikel auxiliaries	Cuzcatlan

Commanders and leaders
Pedro de Alvarado (WIA)	Atlácatl

Strength
250 Spaniards 6,000 auxiliaries	Thousands of Pipil warriors

The Battle of Acajutla took place on June 8, 1524, between the Spanish conquistador Pedro de Alvarado and the standing army of Cuzcatlan Pipils, an Indigenous Nahua state, in the neighborhood of present-day Acajutla, near the coast of western El Salvador.

== Antecedents ==
Hernán Cortés, after conquering the city of Tenochtitlan, capital of the Aztec empire, delegated the conquest of the territories southward to his lieutenant Pedro de Alvarado, who set out with 120 horsemen, 300 foot soldiers, and several hundred Cholula and Tlaxcala auxiliaries. After subduing the highland Mayan city-states of present-day Guatemala through battle and co-optation, the Spanish sought to extend their dominion to the lower Atlantic region of the Nahuat-speaking people whom his translators called "Pipils," then organized as the powerful state of Cuzcatlán. The Kaqchikel Mayans, who had long been rivals of Cuzcatlán for control over their wealthy cacao-producing region, joined forces with Alvarado's men and supported his campaign. Accompanied by thousands of Kaqchikel warriors, Alvarado then marched on Cuzcatlán. The army arrived at the present territory of El Salvador, across the Paz River, on June 6, 1524. Receiving word of the approaching Spanish forces, the Pipil peasants who lived in the nearby villages of Mopicalco and Acatepeque fled.

== Battle ==
On June 8, 1524, the conquerors arrived in the neighborhood of Acajutla (which the Spaniard's called Acaxual). Thousands of Pipil warriors had gathered there to halt their advance into the valley of Sonsonate. According to records, a battle ensued between the opposing armies, with the Pipil wearing cotton armor (of three fingers' thickness, according to Alvarado) and carrying long spears. This circumstance would be crucial in the progression of the battle. Alvarado approached the Pipil lines with his archers' showers of crossbow arrows, but the natives did not retreat. The conquistador noticed the proximity of a nearby hill and knew that it could be a convenient hiding place for his opponents. Alvarado pretended that his army had given up the battle and retreated. The Pipils suddenly rushed the invaders, giving Alvarado an opportunity to inflict massive losses. The Pipils that fell to the ground could not get back on their feet, hindered by the weight of their cotton armor, which enabled the Spanish to slaughter them. Defeated, the Nahuat forces retreated to reassemble further along his route. In a second battle a few days later, the remaining formal Cuzcatlan army again assembled on the battlefield but was finally defeated. In the words of Alvarado: "...the destruction was so great that in just a short time none were left alive...".

In the battle, Alvarado was struck by an arrow to his thigh which fractured his femur. According to later tradition, the arrow that hit the conquistador was shot by a Nahuat-Pipil Tatoni (a prince) called Atonal, but Spanish chronicles do not specify the archer and Atonal appears to have been mythologized as Atlacatl. The resulting infection lasted about eight months and left Alvarado partially crippled, with one leg shorter than the other. In spite of this wound, he continued the campaign, marching with his army into the capital of Cuzcatlan where he assumed authority and enslaved many residents. The remaining Nahua resistance operated from the mountains where his forces could not engage them effectively, and the Nahua were still undefeated when Alvarado returned to Mexico. They were to be finally defeated a decade later, with the second Spanish invasion.

== See also ==
- Spanish conquest of El Salvador

== Bibliography and references ==
- Ministerio de Educación, (1994), Historia de El Salvador Tomo I, México D.F. : Comisión Nacional de los Libros de Texto Gratuitos
- Vidal, Manuel, (1961), Nociones de historia de Centro América, San Salvador: Editorial Universitaria
