= Atlácatl =

Ruler of Cuzcatlan

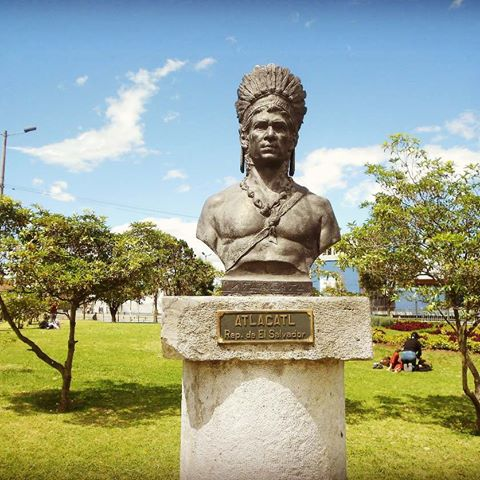
- A bust of Atlácatl located in El Salvador.
- Born: c. 15th century Cuzcatlán
- Died: c. 1528; Present-day El Salvador
- Cause of death: Jumping into a volcano
- Occupation: Ruler of Cuzcatlan
- Known for: Resisting the Spanish conquest of El Salvador

Atlácatl (Nahuatl Ātlācatl: ātl "water", tlācatl "human being"; died c. 1528) is reputed to have been the name of the last ruler of an Indigenous state based around the city of Cuzcatlan, in the southeastern periphery of Mesoamerica (present-day El Salvador), at the time of the Spanish conquest. Atlácatl appears to have been a myth, however, as no contemporary chronicler mentions him. The only mentions of him are in the annals of the Cakchiquels where the Pipil coastal people were called Pan Atacat (water men); this might have been an elite personage or a title for a chief in Pipil culture. The myth is still believed locally. The name "Atlácatl" was adopted by one of El Salvador's elite army battalions: the Atlácatl Battalion.

Cuzcatlan was a powerful state that had incorporated several Nawat Pipil regions in the western and central territory of today's El Salvador. With a standing army and lucrative cacao and Indigo exports, this wealthy state had resisted several Mayan Calakmul ally invasions and was one of the strongest in the region. It was the only polity in the region to maintain a standing army.

The myth of Atlácatl appears to have originated in a historian's misreading of Spanish chronicles. It was later developed as a nation-building myth in modern Salvadoran nationalist discourse, symbolising Cuzcatlan's courageous resistance against the invading Spanish forces. According to another account, when Pedro de Alvarado and his forces arrived at Atehuan (Ateos) he received a message sent to him by Atlacatl in which Atlácatl acquiesced to Alvarado's demand for Cuzcatlan's surrender. Alvarado's own account records that when he entered the city of Cuzcatlan he found it partly abandoned, the men all having fled to the mountainous region nearby. Alvarado sent a demand to them for their surrender, but instead received the answer: "If you want our arms you must come to get them from the mountains". In the myth, it was Atlácatl who sent this message.

Alvarado's forces launched a furious attack on their mountain positions in which many horses, Spaniards and their native auxiliaries were killed. Alvarado retreated from Cuzcatlan on 4 July 1524.

Two years after this battle, Alvarado's kinsman Gonzalo de Alvarado had founded a Spanish base at San Salvador (August 1526), from where the Spanish forces continued to raze the surrounding districts and combat the remaining Pipil resistance. Finally, in 1528, Diego de Alvarado and his Indian auxiliaries set out on another attack on Cuzcatlan, during the defense of which the Nawat Pipil forces were defeated. One embellishment of the Atlácatl myth is that he jumped into a volcano to remain an unconquered legend.

== See also ==
- Battle of Acajutla
- Cuzcatlan
- Anastasio Aquino
- Feliciano Ama
- La Matanza
