= Cuzcatlan =

Pre-Columbian Nahua state confederation

Coordinates: 13.6667°N 89.2333°W

- c. 1200–1528
- Flag Coat of arms

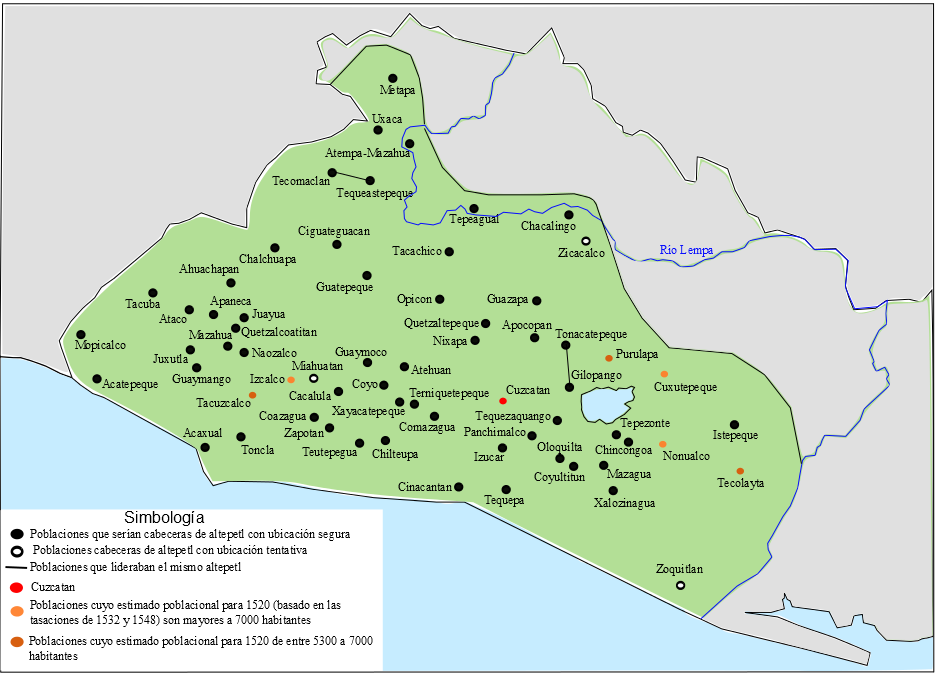
- Capital: Kuskatan
- Official languages: Nawat
- Government: Tributary monarchy
- History
  - Established: c. 1200
  - Disestablished: 1528

Population
  - 1520 estimate: 200,000
- Today part of: El Salvador

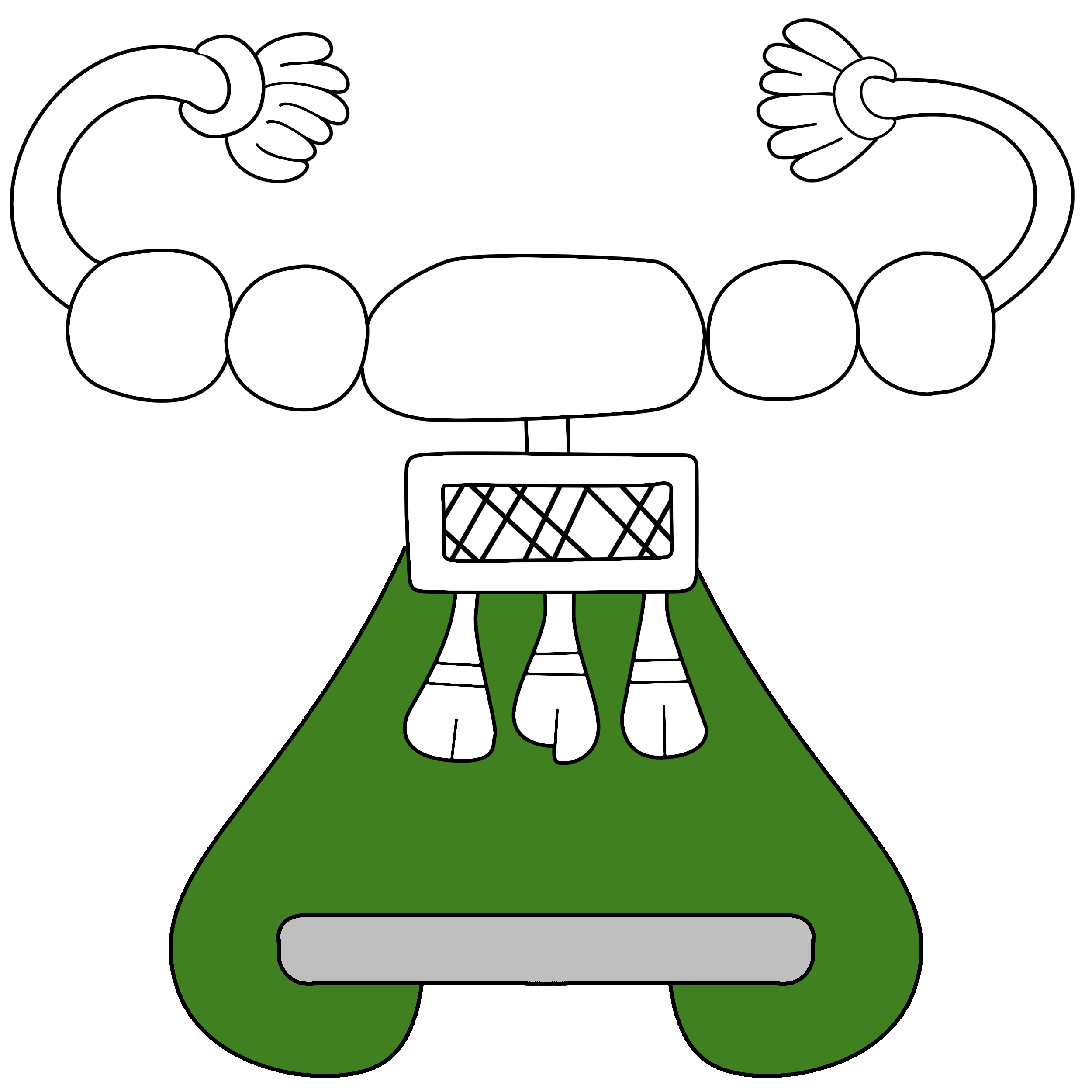
The seal of Kuskatan based on the "Lienzo de Tlaxcala" with the symbol of an altepetl

Cuzcatlan (Pipil: Kuskatan; Nahuatl: Cuzcatlan) was a pre-Columbian Nahua state confederation of the Mesoamerican postclassical period that extended from the Paz river to the Lempa river (covering most of western El Salvador); this was the nation that Spanish chroniclers came to call the Pipils or Cuzcatlecos. No codices survive to shed light to this confederation except the Annals of the Cakchiquels, although Spanish chroniclers such as Domingo Juarros, Palaces, Lozano, and others claim that some codices did exist but have since disappeared. Their Nahuatl language, art and temples revealed that they had significant Mayan and Toltec influence from the ties they had with the Itza in Yucatan. It is believed that the first settlers to arrive came from the Toltec people in central Mexico, mostly Puebla during the Chichimeca-Toltec civil wars in the 10th century AD.

The people of Cuzcatlán came to be called Pipiles in the historical chronicles, a term that today is usually translated as "boys" or less likely as "young nobles." This was due to the perception of the Central Nahuatl-speaking Tlaxcala and Mexica allies of the Spanish that the Nahuas of Cuzcatan were speaking a corrupted version of their language in those regions. An alternative theory is that it meant "nobles," from the Nahuas social class "Pipiltin" and the Nawat Pipil origin story that they are descendants of Nanahuatzin.

== Etymology ==
The name Kuskatan (place of jewel necklaces) possibly comes from the Náwat words "kuskat" (necklace) and Kuzti (jewel) meaning "jewel necklace", and "tan", meaning "among/in/near/place of/with.". In Nahuatl its cognate term is Cuzcat(l)an.

== Origins and history ==
Map of El Salvador's Indigenous Peoples at the time of the Spanish conquest: 1. Pipil people, 2. Lenca, 3. Kakawira o Cacaopera, 4. Xinca, 5. Maya Ch'orti' people, 6. Maya Poqomam people, 7. Mangue o Chorotega.

The Pipil people are an ethnic group who resided in western modern day El Salvador and parts of Honduras. They are a subgroup of Nahua people, who can also be known as Nawats, Nahuats, or Southern Nahuas. Nahua people originally resided in modern-day Mexico with waves of Pipil people migrating to what was Cuzcatlan. This Mesoamerican land is believed to be inhabited by the first wave of Pipils as early as 3000 BCE. Another wave of Nahua migrants, known as the Izalco Pipils, voyaged in the 10th century.

The Nawat Pipil arrived in El Salvador around the year 900. On arrival, they had to fight their way to the new land due to the fact of the Mayan civil wars that were taking place as well but with the treaty or "cult" of Quetzalcoatl, Qʼuqʼumatz and Kukulkan as the Pipil had many Mayan allies. City states such as Tehuacán, Chalchuapa and Cihuatán eventually became absorbed into the Cuzcatlan polity confederation. According to legend, the city of Cuzcatlán (the capital city of Cuzcatan), was founded by the exiled Toltec Ce Acatl Topiltzin around the year 1054. In the 13th century the Pipil city states were most likely unified, and by 1400, a hereditary monarchy had been established. The Pipil people aided in the flourishing of Cuzcatlan and referred to this region as the "Land of the Jewel". Using techniques that were heavily influenced by ancient Mayan culture. Pipil people inhabited this land but also resided with other indigenous groups. They were alongside specifically Lenca and Pokomam Maya and expressed similarities in their culture and traditions. The Pipil created towns and cities that were able to support large populations which were supported by irrigated agricultural lands.

== Political organization ==
The area of Cuzcatan was divided into different regions:

- Cuzcatlán
- Izalco
- Panchimalco
- Apaneca
- Ahuachapán
- Guacotecti
- Ixtepetl
- Apastepeque
- Tehuacán
- Metapan

The Lordship did not form a unified political system and were at first independent, and were obligated to pay tribute/taxes to the polity of Cuzcatán although the four Pipil tribes became a loose confederation, unifying in times of war or natural disasters. With time, they were all annexed by the chiefdom of Cuzcatán, today the modern city of Antiguo Cuscatlán a city and municipality that is part of the San Salvador Metropolitan Area (AMSS).

=== Confederacy ===
The leader of Cuzcatan was the head of state; below him the state elders and priests who advised the ruling family; then a caste of commoners. Upon the death of a Lord, the succession was hereditary starting with the eldest son and so on. In case there were no sons available, the closest male family member was chosen by the counsel of elders and priests.

At the time of the Spanish conquest, Cuzcatan had developed into a powerful state that maintained a strong standing army. It had successfully resisted Mayan invasions and was the strongest military force in the region.

==== Lords of Cuzcatlan ====
There were many Lords of Cuzcatlan; most have been forgotten with time, but historical writings by Spanish chroniclers, including Domingo Juarros, mention some that may have existed:

- Cuachimicín: Governed before the Spanish conquest, he was overthrown and executed by the priests.
- Tutecotzimit: Successor of the previous one, restored the hereditary system.
- Pilguanzimit
- Tonaltut
- Atlácatl or Atacat: He is said to have killed off many of Diego de Alvarado's horses and horsemen during the last stand for Cuzcatlan at the Cinacantan stone masonry fort.

Over time, a legend developed that the last leader of Cuzcatlan was named Atacat, some authors say this is a mistake originating from a misreading of a few Spanish accounts. Historical accounts of the Annals of the Cakchiquels called the Pipil coastal people Panatacat (place of the water man); this could have been a name or a title for a person as well. After the collapse of the Nawat standing warriors in the first two battles with Alvarado's forces, Alvarado entered the capital of Cuzcatlan without resistance. Initially the people had to accept this conquest, offering gifts and service. Alvarado then enslaved those Nawat Pipil that they could capture. The Lenca people in the eastern zone maintained a guerrilla resistance for a further decade with Lord Lempira.

=== Warrior Society ===
Warrior service was obligatory for men from about age 15 or 20 until they were unable to serve due to age. The warrior's attire consisted of a breastplate, a corselete or vest (made of cotton) and a mashte (species of loin cloth) and each painted their faces and bodies with unique colored abstract shapes and forms. The warriors were organized in teams or platoons bearing distinctive names, such as:

- The Jaguars
- The Eagles
- The Brave Owls

The warriors of Cuzcatlan had a variety of weapons, most made of wood and volcanic rock shards. Pedro de Alvarado reported that they also wore thick cotton armor, which were evidently designed to repel the caliber of throwing weapons they themselves had (see list below) as it could not repel Spanish lances. So heavy was this cotton when it became wet, Alvarado reported, that the Nahuat soldiers could not rise from the ground when thrown down. No pictorial depiction of this armor has survived. Some of the documented weapons are described below.

- Tecuz (Lance): there were two types, a long spear that according to the Spanish conquistador Pedro de Alvarado it was 6.3 metres (20.6 feet). The second one was a more maneuverable shorter spear.
- Macuáhuit (mallet): made out of strong wood with sharpened obsidian at the end.
- Tahuítul (bow) and Mit (arrows):
- Malacate (disc): Most likely made of sharpened rock and used in the hand-to-hand combat.

== Geography ==
The Lordship of Cuzcatan covered an area of approximately 10,000 km^{2} covering a large part of the central and western areas of present-day El Salvador and covering different varieties of environments with a total of 7 plant formations between the coast and elevations greater than 2,000 meters.

== Economy ==
The economy of Cuzcatlan had contributions from both the indigenous Pipil people who inhabited the land and Spanish conquistadors post colonization. Indigenous economy consisted of the Pipil people and even indigenous Mexican, including Nahua and Mixtec. The economy was based on the barter or exchange of agriculture and handcrafted goods such as multicolored textiles.

Cocoa bean and Indigo dye was a major export crop that was carefully cultivated in the Izalcos area and traded throughout the isthmus. Indigo specifically was a large part of Cuzcatlan economy, it was the base for agrarian and industrial products. The large dependency on Indigo and Cocoa beans required massive amounts of labor which were carried out by the areas indigenous people. This became a large way for people to survive as the landowning class grew due to its labor system. Its production involved the construction of an elaborate irrigation network, parts of which can still be seen today. Cacao served in the region as currency.

Other agricultural products grown by the Pipil were cotton, squash, corn, beans, fruits, balsam, some peppers, and chocolate; but chocolate could only be prepared and served to the ruling class. There was modest mining of gold and silver, although these were not used as currency but as offering to their many gods. Only the priests and the ruling family could use gold and silver as ornaments.

Another large contribution to Cuzcatlan economy was the establishment of slave trafficking and labor which appeared after Spaniard colonization. Pedro de Alvarado began establishing slave labor throughout Central America beginning in modern-day Guatemala. This was then established into Cuzcatlan during his first invasion in 1524. As Spaniards continued to settle in the Cuzcatlan, it became common for their households to contain indigenous slaves, typically women to act as servants. Many of these slaves were obtained through war or through barter. Those who were not placed into households would be forced to contribute to local cultivation. Settlements would be assigned to an "encomienda" which indicates what type of contribution they must provide. Typically an "encomienda" consisted of food products such as maize, beans, chilli peppers, turkeys, venison, salt, dried fish, honey, and beeswax. However, it was also common to be assigned firewood, woven cotton clothes and clothing. These contributions were expected and required of the settlements and acted as payment to the Spaniards. Those who failed to pay their contributions were typically faced with threats and even violent force.

There were large contributions to the Cuzcatlan economy due to the creation of Spanish industries in the area. They began to overtake the economy due to the large local force that they exerted. A new dynamic was established as these industries consisted of Spanish overseers and indigenous mestizo. One of the most significant industries they cultivated were war supplies. During the years 1525 - 1539, there was an influx of raids that occurred in the area. This led to slave labor being utilized for the creation of war supplies such as iron. Archaeology and architecture also gained prevalence in the area due to Spanish influence. This is another industry that was dependent on male indigenous labor for brick making, roof and tile manufacturing, blacksmithing, and charcoal making.

== Religion ==
Through Spanish chroniclers (cronistas) and archaeological investigations we know that the Señorío de Cuzcatlán was well organized with respect to its "Creator" or "Divine energy of life" Tiyut/Teotl, its priesthood, first ancestors, religious rites, etc. One of the pilgrimage sites was the sanctuary dedicated to the ancestor goddess Nuictlán constructed by Cē Ācatl Topiltzin Quetzalcoatl and located on Lake Güija. Human sacrifice was practiced during war time as part of a warrior code of honor.

=== Deities/Spirits associated with the Nahuas of Cuzcatan ===
The people living in the ancient Cuzcatlán possibly attributed cosmic power to the following: Xipe Totec, Quetzalcoatl, Ehécatl, Tláloc, Chacmool, Tonatiuh, Chalchiuhtlicue and others. In addition there were some deities identified with the Señorío of Cuzcatlán like Itzqueye. Téotl, Quetzalcoatl and Itzqueye were three of the most important to the people's spiritual beliefs.

== Music ==
Cuzcatlan was within proximity to other indigenous groups, with their music being made up of new ideologies and borrowed traditions. A specific instrument used music was a slit drum that Cuzcatlan's referred to as tepunahuaxtles. This drum was not specific to the Cuzcatlan people. It is believed that this sacred drum could be dated back to ancient Mesoamerica. This word derives from the Aztec word Teponaztli, which means drum. In Aztec ceremonies this drum was used for religious, military, and royal ceremonies which reflected the use of this instrument in Cuzcatlan.

== Fall of Cuzcatlan ==
After the fall of the Aztec Empire, Hernán Cortés sent Pedro de Alvarado to conquer the native city states further south. After subduing or striking alliances with the Mayan peoples in the highlands, on June 6, 1524, Pedro de Alvarado crossed the Paz river with a few hundred soldiers and thousands of Kaqchikel Mayan allies and subdued the Cacique of Izalco (the first major city state en route to Cuzcatlan). Fierce battles were fought in defense of Izalco in Acaxual (today Acajutla in the Spanish version) and Tacuzcalco. On June 17, de Alvarado arrived in Cuzcatan. Some of the population acquiesced to his rule; others fled to the mountains.

After the fall of Cuzcatan in 1525, Pedro de Alvarado's cousin Diego de Alvarado established the Villa De San Salvador. Over the next three years, various attempts by the Nahuas of Cuzcatan to destroy the newly founded town resulted in the decision to move the town a few kilometers south to its present location, to the valley commonly known as "the valley of the hammocks" (due to significant seismic activity) next to the Quezaltepeque (San Salvador) volcano.

== Legacy ==
Archeological sites in El Salvador include the Tazumal complex, which has Mesoamerican masonry, including truncated pyramids resembling those of Toltec temple sites. Other sites include San Andrés, Cara Sucia, Joya de Cerén and Cihuatán. Otherwise, Kuskatan is not known for the kind of monumental architecture used by the Classical Maya because its later Spanish rulers dismantled most of the palaces and temples over the centuries to build walls and roads. El Salvador is one of the most looted archeological places in the western hemisphere, with many artifacts being looted in recent years, including the Izalco Jaguar heads and artifacts in museums.

In 2020, the Kuskatan football team joined ConIFA, the football governing body for non-FIFA members.

== See also ==
- Anastasio Aquino's Rebellion
- Prudencia Ayala
- Feliciano Ama
- El Mozote Massacre
- La Matanza
- Kuchkabal
