= Chapagua =

Village in Colón Department, Honduras

Coordinates: 15°50′N 85°47′W

Chapagua is a Honduran village of more than 700 inhabitants, located the banks of the Chapagua River in the department of Colón. The village is roughly halfway between Trujillo and Tocoa as one travels along the main highway. To reach Chapagua, one exits the highway at Aguas Amarillas and travels east along the pea gravel road for about four miles. The village consists of a grade school, a soccer field, two churches, several pulperias (micro stores), and scores of residences.

Chapagua is one of the most peaceful communities in Honduras. As a municipality, it is an exceptionally tranquil area, posing no risks whatsoever to its residents. The Aguán River—now also known as the Chapagua River—flows alongside this community. Yet, the Honduran government has completely neglected to provide any support, leaving the river to gradually encroach upon and consume the area, year after year.

== History ==
Chapagua is one of the oldest communities in the entire municipality of Trujillo and the entire department of Colon. Even before the Spaniards arrived, it already existed as an indigenous Nahua (probably Pipil) community. Hernán Cortés met with an envoy from Chapagua in the early 16th century and noted that he spoke Nahuatl, though with some variation in pronunciation and vocabulary. Cortés also mentioned that Chapagua was a sizeable town with ten tributary settlements.

In the nineteenth century, Chapagua was home to a community of English-speaking blacks.

Hurricane Mitch devastated the community in 1998, washing away the adobe and thatch houses and killing virtually all the livestock. The houses have since been rebuilt with concrete. Dozens of Chapaguenses migrated to the United States in the aftermath of Mitch. Many of the remaining residents are cattle ranchers and farmers.
