= Spanish conquest of El Salvador =

Spanish conquistador campaign (1524 ~ 1539

- Part of the Spanish colonization of the Americas
- Indigenous ethnic groups of El Salvador, prior to Spanish conquest
Date	1524 – c. 1539
Location	El Salvador, Central America
Result	Spanish victory
Territorial changes	Incorporation of El Salvador into the Viceroyalty of New Spain

Belligerents
(Spain) Spanish Empire, including Indian auxiliaries	Cuzcatlán Indigenous peoples of El Salvador, including: Ch'orti' Maya people; Lenca people; Mangue people; Matagalpa people; Pipil people; Poqomam Maya people; Xinca people

Commanders and leaders
Pedro de Alvarado (WIA); Gonzalo de Alvarado	Atlácatl

The Spanish conquest of El Salvador was the campaign undertaken by the Spanish conquistadores against the Late Postclassic Mesoamerican polities in the territory that is now incorporated into the modern Central American country of El Salvador. El Salvador is the smallest country in Central America, and is dominated by two mountain ranges running east–west. Its climate is tropical, and the year is divided into wet and dry seasons. Before the conquest the country formed a part of the Mesoamerican cultural region, and was inhabited by a number of indigenous peoples, including the Pipil, the Lenca, the Xinca, and Maya. Native weaponry consisted of spears, bows and arrows, and wooden swords with inset stone blades; they wore padded cotton armour.

The Spanish conquistadores were largely volunteers, receiving the spoils of victory instead of a salary; many were experienced soldiers who had already campaigned in Europe. The Spanish expeditions to Central America were launched from three different Spanish jurisdictions, resulting in rival conquests by mutually hostile Spanish captains. Spanish weaponry included swords, firearms, crossbows and light artillery. Metal armour was impractical in the hot, humid climate of Central America and the Spanish were quick to adopt the quilted cotton armour of the natives. The conquistadors were supported by a large number of Indian auxiliaries drawn from previously encountered Mesoamerican groups.

The first campaign against the native inhabitants was undertaken in 1524 by Pedro de Alvarado. Alvarado launched his expedition against the Pipil province of Cuzcatlan, also known as Nequepio, from the Guatemalan Highlands, but by July 1524 he had retreated back to Guatemala. Gonzalo de Alvarado founded San Salvador the following year, but it was eradicated by a native attack in 1526, during a general uprising that spread across the region. Pedro de Alvarado returned to campaign in El Salvador in 1526 and 1528, and in the latter year, Diego de Alvarado reestablished San Salvador and issued encomiendas to his supporters. In 1528, the uprising finally ended when the Spanish stormed the native stronghold at the Peñol de Cinacantan.

In 1529, El Salvador became embroiled in a jurisdictional dispute with neighbouring Nicaragua. Pedrarias Dávila sent Martín de Estete at the head of an expedition to annex the territory to Nicaragua. Estete captured the leader of a rival Spanish expedition in eastern El Salvador, and marched on San Salvador, before being repulsed by a relief force sent from Guatemala. In 1530, Pedro de Alvarado ordered the establishment of a new settlement at San Miguel, in the east of the country, to protect against further incursions from Nicaragua and to assist in the conquest of the surrounding area. Indigenous uprisings against the invaders continued, spreading from neighbouring Honduras. The general uprising across the two provinces was put down by the end of 1538, and by 1539 the province was considered pacified. The conquistadores discovered that there was little gold or silver to be found in El Salvador, and it became a colonial backwater with a small Spanish population, within the jurisdiction of the Captaincy General of Guatemala.

== El Salvador before the conquest ==
Before the conquest, El Salvador formed a part of the Mesoamerican cultural region. The central and western portions of the territory were inhabited by the Pipil, a Nahua people culturally related to the Aztecs of Mexico. The Pipil were divided into three main provinces in El Salvador; the two largest were Cuscatlan and Izalco, while Nonualco was the smallest of the three. Cuscatlan extended from the Paz River in the west to the Lempa River in the east. Izalco lay to the southwest of Cuscatlan and was subservient to it on the eve of the Spanish conquest; its territory is now incorporated into the modern departments of Ahuachapan and Sonsonate. The Nonualco area is in the region of La Paz centered around the city of Zacatecoluca. Other indigenous groups with territories in El Salvador were the Ch'orti' and the Poqomam (both of these were Maya peoples), the Lenca, the Xinca, the Kakawira, and the Mangue. The Postclassic Maya and Pipil cities were relatively small by Mesoamerican standards, especially when compared with the great Maya cities of the earlier Classic period (c. 250–950 AD). The Lenca occupied territory to the east of the Lempa River, where their principal kingdom was Chaparrastique. Chaparrastique extended across territory now incorporated into the departments of La Unión, Morazán, and San Miguel. The Ch'orti' and Poqomam occupied territories in the west near the present day border of Guatemala. The extreme east of El Salvador was occupied by the Mangue, with the Matagalpa in the southeast. The population of the entire territory of El Salvador is variously estimated between 130,000 and 1,000,000 at the time of the conquest; the low-mid estimates within this range are more likely.

The three principal kingdoms of Cuscatlan, Izalco, and Chaparrastique engaged in regular warfare, and smaller groups occasionally rebelled against their larger neighbours. There was flourishing trade, with cacao as the principal commodity, although maize, cotton, and balsam were also traded.

=== Native weaponry and tactics ===
The Pipil used wooden weapons with stone blades. Their weapons included long spears, atlatls (spear-throwers), arrows, and the macana (a wooden sword with inset obsidian blades similar to the Aztec macahuitl). These weapons proved inferior to elements of Spanish warfare such as steel, the horse and firearms. The Spanish described how the natives of El Salvador wore thick cotton armour, described as three fingers thick, that extended down to their feet and significantly encumbered them.

After the first two large-scale battles between the Spanish and Pipil armies resulted in decisive victories for the European invaders, the natives preferred to flee their settlements at their approach rather than face the conquistadors on an open battlefield. A common tactic of the natives was to concentrate themselves in strongly defended mountaintop fortresses.

== Background to the conquest ==
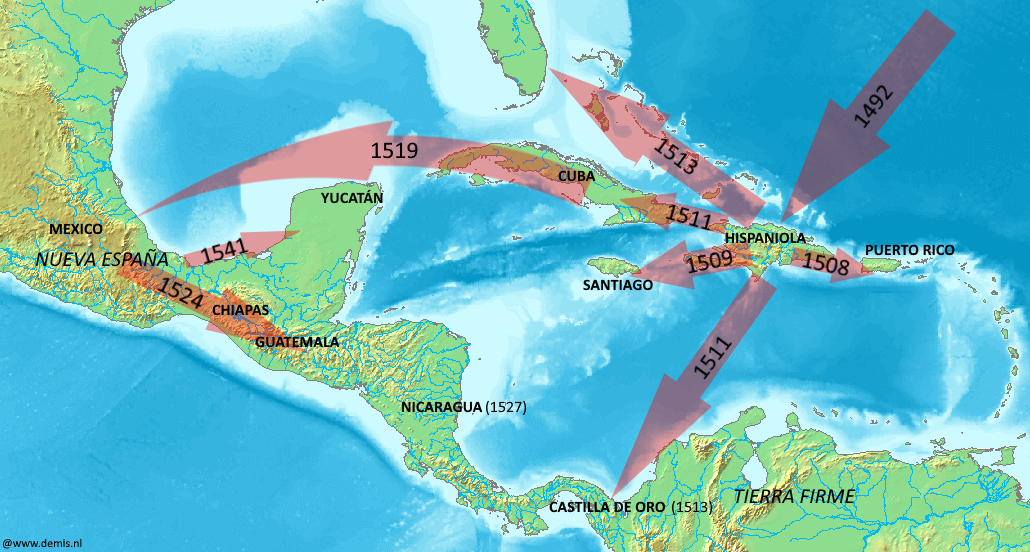
Map of Spanish expansion in the Caribbean during the 16th century

Christopher Columbus discovered the New World for the Kingdom of Castile and Leon in 1492. Private adventurers thereafter entered into contracts with the Spanish Crown to conquer the newly discovered lands in return for tax revenues and the power to rule. The Spanish founded Santo Domingo on the Caribbean island of Hispaniola in the 1490s. In the first decades after the discovery of the new lands, the Spanish colonised the Caribbean and established a centre of operations on the island of Cuba.

In the first two decades of the 16th century, the Spanish established their domination over the islands of the Caribbean Sea, and used these as a staging point to launch their campaigns of conquest on the continental mainland of the Americas. From Hispaniola, the Spanish launched expeditions and campaigns of conquest, reaching Puerto Rico in 1508, Jamaica in 1509, Cuba in 1511, and Florida in 1513. The Spanish heard rumours of the rich empire of the Aztecs on the mainland to the west of their Caribbean island settlements and, in 1519, Hernán Cortés set sail to explore the Mexican coast. By August 1521 the Aztec capital of Tenochtitlan had fallen to the Spanish. The Spanish conquered a large part of Mexico within three years, extending as far south as the Isthmus of Tehuantepec. The newly conquered territory became New Spain, headed by a viceroy who answered to the Spanish Crown via the Council of the Indies. The conquest of Central America that followed was effectively an extension of the campaign that overthrew the Aztec Empire.

== Conquistadors ==
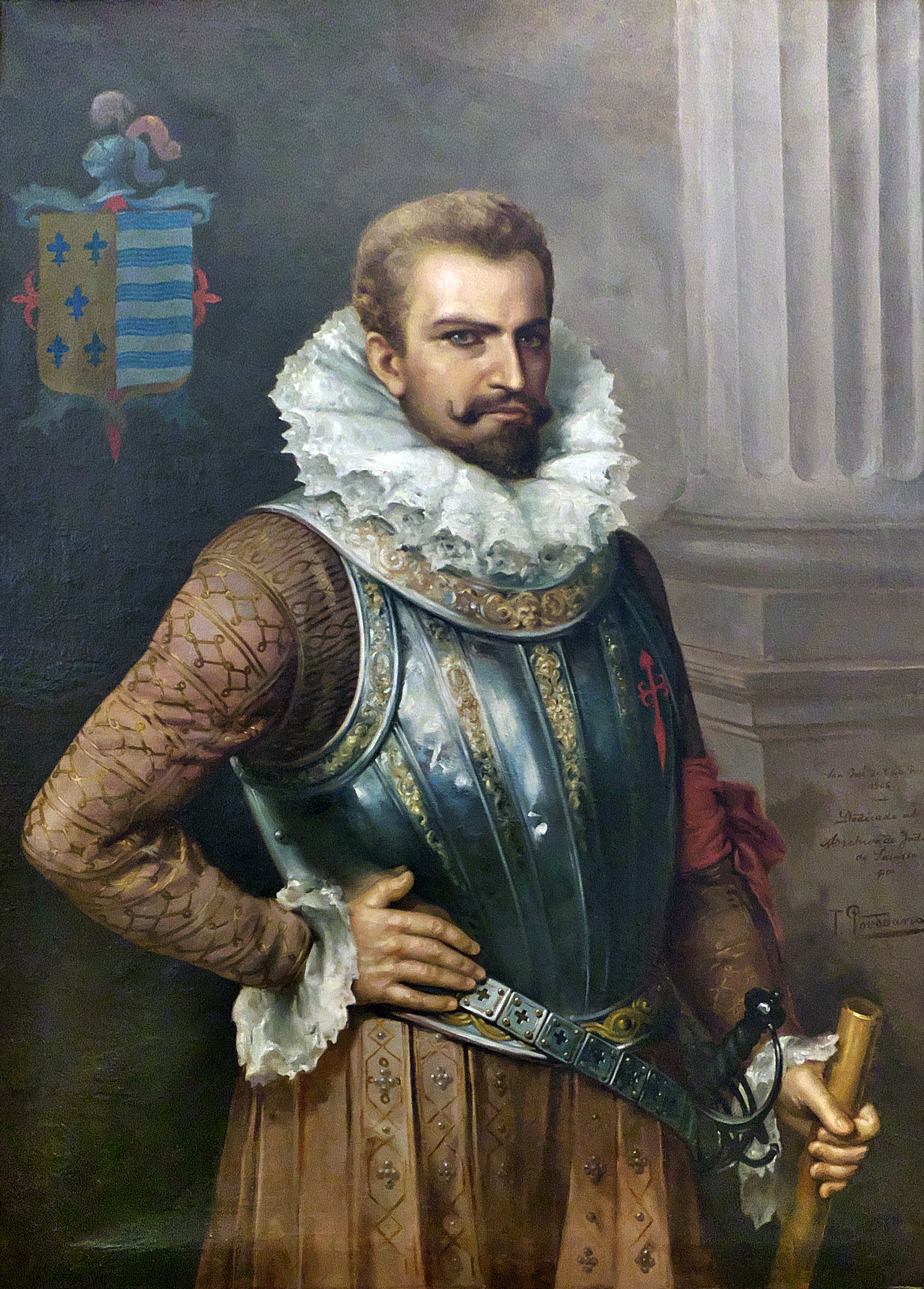
Pedro de Alvarado led the initial Spanish incursion into El Salvador.

The conquistadors were all volunteers, the majority of whom did not receive a fixed salary but instead a portion of the spoils of victory, in the form of precious metals, land grants and provision of native labour. Many of the Spanish were already experienced soldiers who had previously campaigned in Europe. A sizeable portion of the Spanish conquistadors were from the southwestern regions of Spain, with their origins in Andalusia and Extremadura. Up to 1519, according to licenses issued in Spain, over half were from these two regions. From 1520 to 1539, this fell to just under half of all conquistadors leaving Spain. The conquest of the Central American Isthmus was launched from three directions; Mexico, Panama, and the Caribbean island of Hispaniola (present day Haiti). Relations between rival conquistadors were dominated by mutual distrust, greed, and envy.

The conquistadors were accompanied by a great many indigenous allies. These included Tlaxcaltecs, Mexicas, Cholutecs, Xochimilcos, Texcocanos, and Huejotzincas that accompanied Pedro de Alvarado from central Mexico, Zapotecs and Mixtecs that joined him as he marched south towards Guatemala and El Salvador, and Kaqchikels that joined him in Guatemala.

A key strategy was the establishment of colonial towns across the territories that underwent the process of conquest and colonisation; they were used to project Spanish power over the surrounding countryside. The Spanish were particularly horrified by the Mesoamerican religious practice of human sacrifice, prompting them to attempt to eradicate the native religion.

=== Spanish weapons and armour ===
The steel sword was the greatest Spanish advantage in terms of weaponry. The conquistadors employed broadswords, rapiers, firearms (including the arquebus), crossbows and light artillery such as the falconet. An important Spanish advantage was the use of war horses; their deployment often terrified the native inhabitants of the Americas, who had never seen horses until European contact. As important as the physical advantage given to a mounted conquistador was the ability to rapidly move bodies of troops across a battlefield to outmaneuver their opponents, who were exclusively on foot. Repeated mounted charges could have a devastating impact on massed native infantry. The Spanish also employed fierce war dogs in battle. When laying siege to native fortresses, they would on occasion build wooden siege engines padded with cotton armour, which would act to shield attackers from enemy missiles, and allow them to climb over any fortifications. Mounted conquistadors were armed with a 3.7-metre (12 ft) lance, that also served as a pike for infantrymen. A variety of halberds and bills were also employed. As well as the one-handed broadsword, a 1.7-metre (5.5 ft) long two-handed version was also used. Crossbows had 0.61-metre (2 ft) arms stiffened with hardwoods, horn, bone and cane, and supplied with a stirrup to facilitate drawing the string with a crank and pulley. Crossbows were easier to maintain than matchlocks, especially in a humid tropical climate.

Metal armour was of limited use in the hot, wet tropical climate. It was heavy and had to be constantly cleaned to prevent rusting; in direct sunlight, metal armour became unbearably hot. Conquistadores often went without metal armour, or only donned it immediately prior to battle. They were quick to adopt quilted cotton armour based upon that used by their native opponents, and commonly combined this with the use of a simple metal war hat. Shields were considered essential by both infantry and cavalry; generally this was a circular target shield, convex in form and fashioned from iron or wood. Rings secured it to the arm and hand.

== Impact of Old World diseases ==
Diseases introduced to the Americas by the conquistadors had a great impact upon indigenous populations. As the Spanish were occupied with the conquest of Mexico, these diseases ran ahead of them from 1519 onwards. A smallpox epidemic swept through Guatemala in 1520–1521, and is also likely to have spread throughout the Pipil region of El Salvador. By the time the Spanish arrived in the area in 1524, it is estimated that up to 50% of the native population of El Salvador had already been eliminated by the new diseases, against which they had no immunity. It is likely that disease had significantly weakened the Pipil by the time they fielded large armies against the Spanish at Acajutla and Tacuzcalco. Further waves of epidemic diseases spread across Mesoamerica in 1545–1548, and again in 1576–1581, reducing indigenous populations to just 10% of their pre-contact levels, making successful resistance against the European colonisers extremely difficult. The deadliest of the newly introduced diseases were smallpox, malaria, measles, typhus, and yellow fever. Their introduction was catastrophic in the Americas; it is estimated that 90% of the indigenous population had been eliminated by disease within the first century of European contact.

== Spanish discovery of El Salvador ==
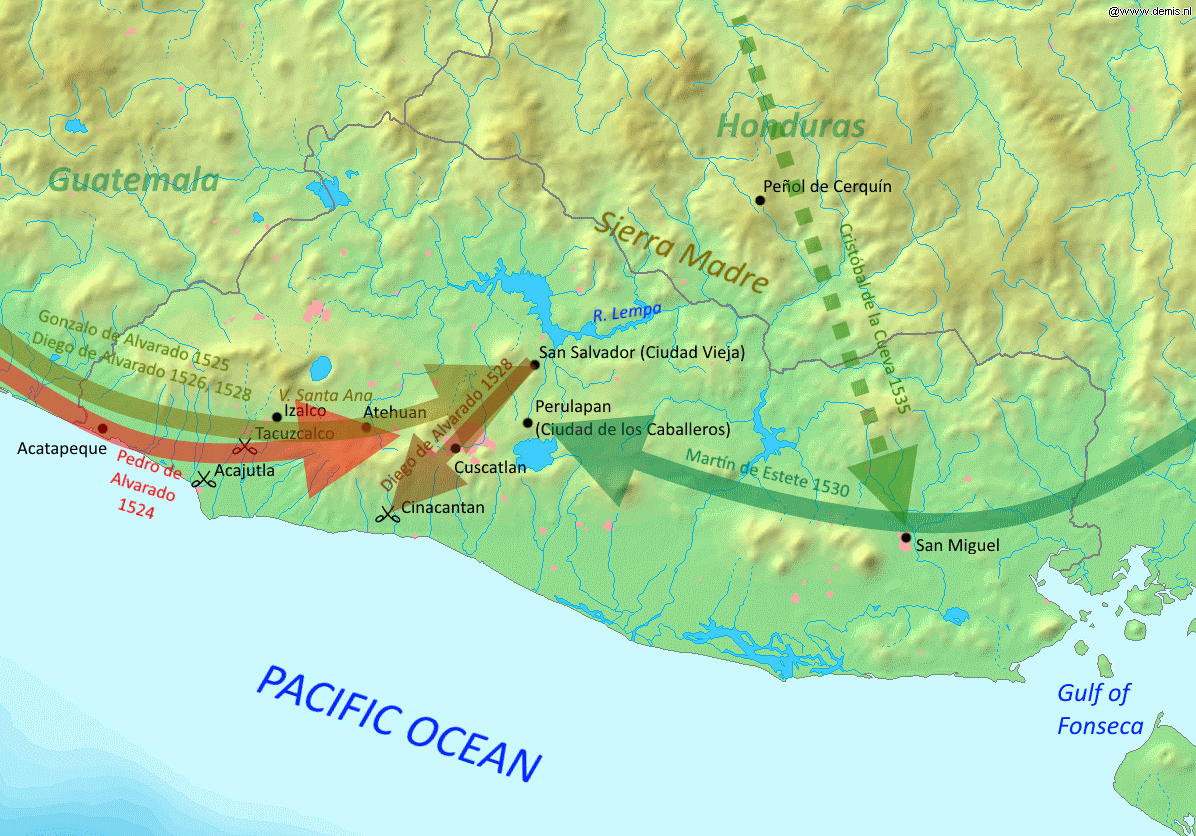
Principal expedition routes of the Spanish conquest of El Salvador

Gil González Dávila and Andrés Niño first explored the coast of El Salvador in 1522 as they sailed northwest along the Pacific coast of Central America from Panama, and briefly landed in the Bay of Fonseca. El Salvador fell in a frontier region between rival conquests launched southward from Mexico under the command of Hernán Cortés and his trusted lieutenant Pedro de Alvarado, and northward from Panama under the command of Pedrarias Dávila.

== Conquest ==
The territory now incorporated into El Salvador was not politically unified at the time of Spanish contact. As with neighbouring regions, this hindered the progress of incorporation into the Spanish Empire, as each small kingdom had to be overcome in turn; this contrasted with Mexico where a large empire had been rapidly overcome with the fall of its capital, Tenochtitlan. As Spanish authority gradually spread out from Mexico and Panama, this left El Salvador in an intermediate region temporarily beyond Spanish control. Spanish colonial towns were founded according to the whim of individual conquistadors, with no formal planning of their location or of communication routes between them, often leaving them isolated. In 1548, El Salvador was formally placed within the jurisdiction of the Audiencia Real of Guatemala, which extended along the Central American isthmus from Chiapas, now in southern Mexico, to Costa Rica.

=== First expeditions, 1524–1528 ===
Pedro de Alvarado entered El Salvador from Guatemala in the rain season of 1524, leading an army of 250 Spaniards, 100 of which were mounted, and 5,000 Guatemalan allies. The invaders overcame the natives in pitched battles and fought off guerrilla attacks on their forces. Alvarado crossed the Río Paz from Guatemala on 6 June 1524, and arrived at Mopicalco, in what is now the department of Ahuachapán, to find it abandoned. They continued to Acatepeque, where the inhabitants had also fled the approaching Spanish expedition.

==== Battle of Acajutla, 1524 ====
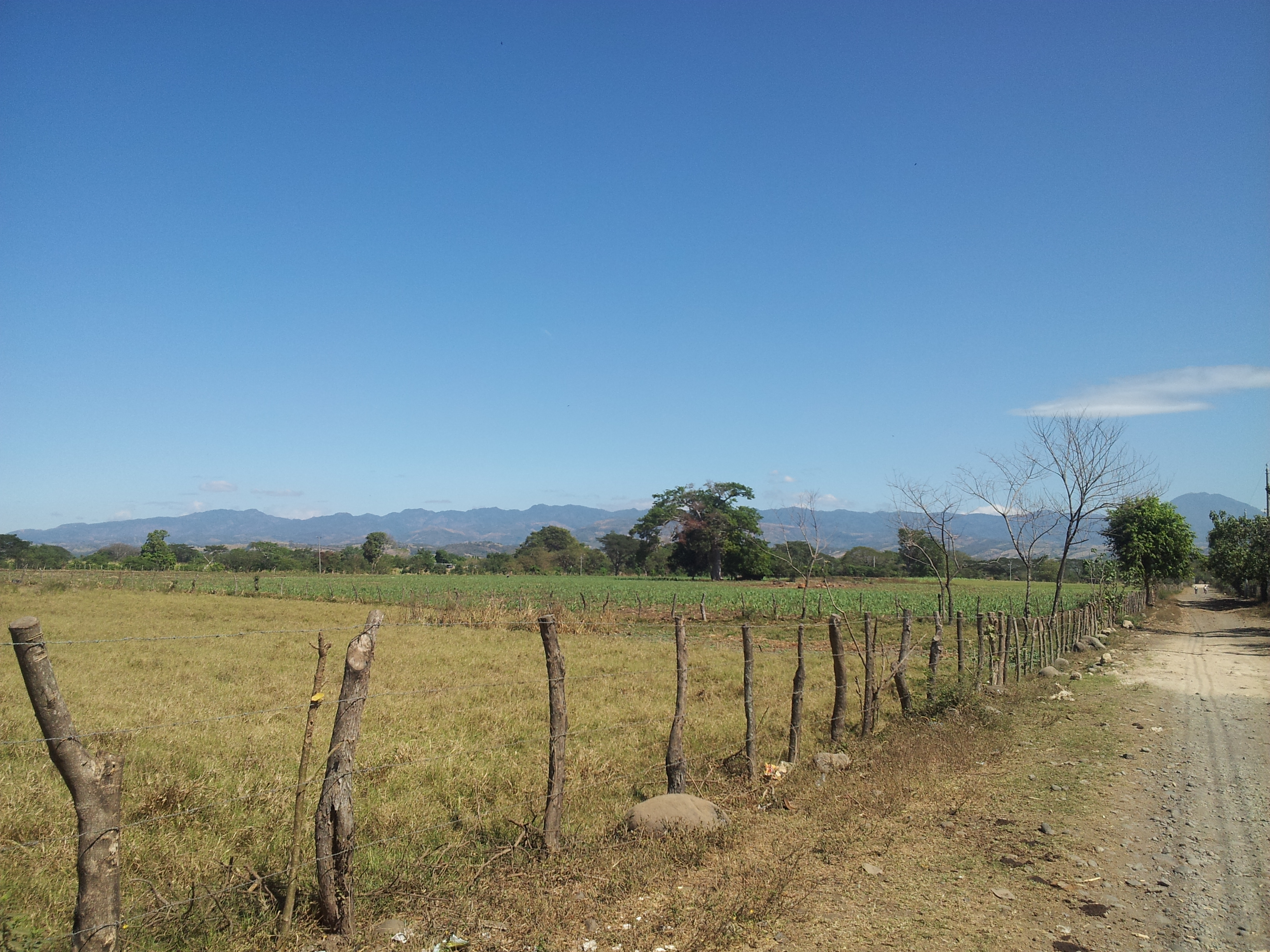
Acajutla is located on El Salvador's coastal plain.

From Acatepeque, the Spanish expedition proceeded to Acajutla, on the Pacific coast. On 8 June 1524, they met with a massed native force, arrayed for battle half a league (approximately 2 kilometres (1.2 mi)) beyond the settlement. Alvarado's army initially approached close to the waiting warriors, before feigning a retreat towards a nearby hill. The native forces pursued for a quarter of a league, arriving within bow-shot of the invaders, at which point Alvarado ordered both cavalry and infantry to charge. In the battle that followed, the defending natives were killed to a man. Alvarado described how the natives were so encumbered by their thick cotton armour and their weapons, that when they fell they were unable to stand back up to defend themselves. Many Spaniards were wounded in the battle, and Alvarado was seriously injured by an arrow that passed through his leg, he needed much time to recover and was left with a permanent limp. The Spanish rested in Acajutla for five days after the battle, in order to rest and recover from their wounds.

==== Battle of Tacuzcalco, 1524 ====
Six days after the battle, Alvarado marched northeast searching for the city of Tacuzcalco, some 8 kilometres (5.0 mi) from Acajutla, in the modern department of Sonsonate. Pedro de Portocarrero led a group of mounted scouts that managed to capture two native lookouts, from whom they learned that a large native army had gathered near the city, with forces gathered from the surrounding area. The Spanish scouts advanced until they found the enemy, then waited for the vanguard of forty cavalry led by Gonzalo de Alvarado. Pedro de Alvarado was travelling in the rearguard, slowed by his wounds. Alvarado watched the battle unfold from a nearby viewpoint, and left command in the hands of his brothers. He sent Gómez de Alvarado with twenty cavalry to attack the left flank, and Gonzalo de Alvarado with thirty cavalry against the right flank. He sent Jorge de Alvarado with the rest of his men against a mass of warriors that was still distant but they stood off for a time, believing that the two forces were separated by a swamp. As soon as the Spanish discovered that the apparent swamp was in fact solid ground, they charged the enemy and routed them, killing a great many. After this battle, the Pipil refused to confront the Spanish upon an open battlefield, and resorted to guerilla tactics.

==== Retreat to Guatemala, 1524 ====
Alvarado rested two days at Tazuzcalco, before proceeding to Miahuaclan, which had been abandoned by its inhabitants, then on to Atehuan (modern Ateos, near the Pipil city of Cuzcatlan, capital of the province of the same name). Messengers from the lords of Cuzcatlan brought promises of submission to the King of Spain, but when Pedro de Alvarado's army arrived at the city, he found that the majority of the inhabitants had fled. Alvarado sent messengers to them, ordering them to return and submit, but they refused. Alvarado tried them in their absence, and condemned them to death; he branded all the Pipil prisoners as slaves.

Although the Spanish had won decisive victories at Sonsonate and Acajutla, they failed to take the fortified Pipil cities of Cuzcatlan and Izalco. Alvarado was informed that extensive lands lay ahead, with difficult terrain, many cities, and large populations. Frustrated by the lack of progress, Alvarado withdrew to Guatemala to regroup, with the intention of returning in the dry season; He had been in the province of Cuzcatlan for seventeen days, and left it at the end of June 1524.

==== Founding of San Salvador ====
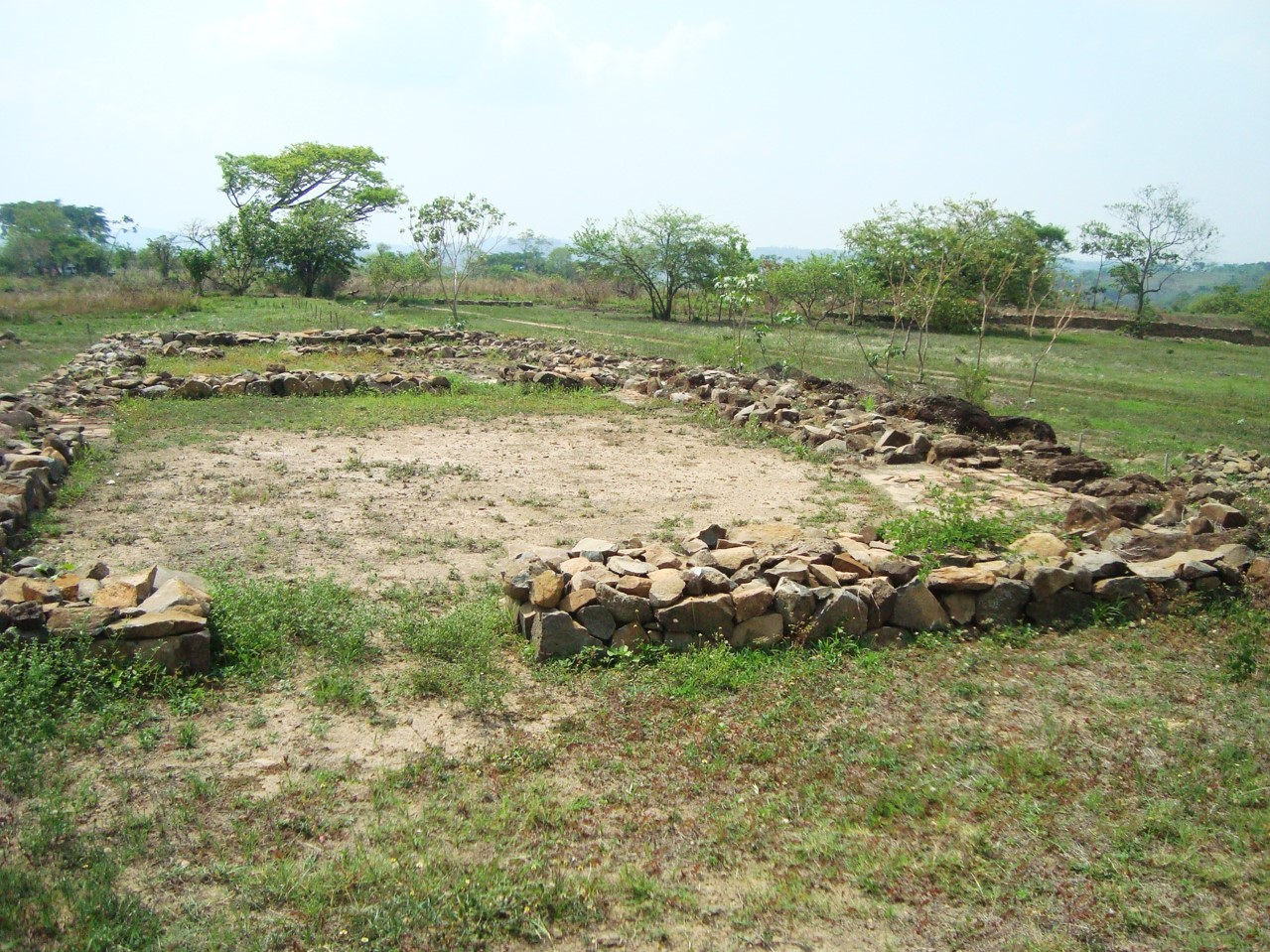
Ruins of San Salvador (Ciudad Vieja)

Gonzalo de Alvarado founded the settlement of Villa de San Salvador in early 1525, before May of that year, but it was attacked and destroyed by natives in 1526, during a general Pipil uprising that engulfed the province of Cuzcatlan. Diego de Alvarado, who was Pedro de Alvarado's cousin, was sent to reconquer Cuzcatlan in the same year; he was accompanied by 300 Indian auxiliaries from Soconusco, 160 of whom died in the campaign. He was joined by Pedro de Alvarado after the latter returned from an expedition to Chiapas. By 1526, the territory of El Salvador, Guatemala, and Honduras was racked by indigenous wars against the Spanish invaders. Izalco did not join the general uprising, having been militarily exhausted by the battles of Acajutla and Tacuzcalco. The campaign that followed lasted two years, during which the Spanish battled continually against indigenous resistance. During this time, the natives defended themselves from fortified mountain strongholds. Pedro de Alvarado undertook further expeditions to El Salvador in 1526 and 1528. In 1528, the conquest of Cuzcatlan was completed, with the aid of a significant body of Nahua allies from central and southern Mexico. On 1 April 1528, Diego de Alvarado reestablished San Salvador, and distributed encomienda rights among his supporters. This site is now known as Ciudad Vieja, and is situated 8 kilometres (5.0 mi) south of Suchitoto. The location may have been chosen because it occupied a no-man's-land between the territory of the Pipil to the west, the Lenca to the east, and the Ch'orti' to the north. For the first few years, San Salvador was a frontier town under the constant threat of indigenous attack. Soon after the town was re-founded, a Spaniard and some indigenous auxiliaries were killed when visiting a nearby settlement.

==== Battle of Cinacantan, 1528 ====
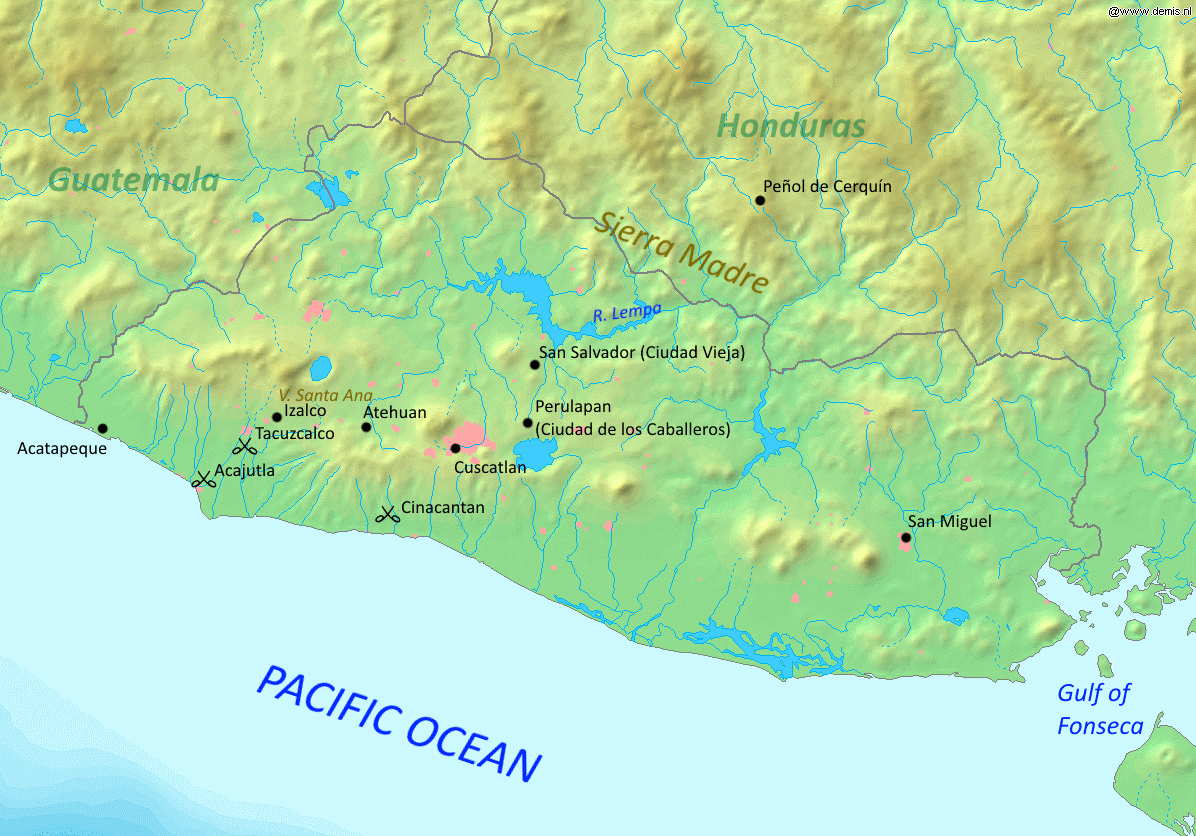
Map of the principal settlements and battles of the conquest of El Salvador

The uprising around San Salvador was put down about a month later, when the Spanish stormed the mountaintop stronghold at Cinacantan, 5 kilometres (3.1 mi) south of the modern town of Tamanique. The hostile natives had retreated to their stronghold after their earlier attack. The uprising was considered the first native rebellion in Cuzcatlan, since the initial invasion had already taken place, and San Salvador founded as a Spanish town. A Spanish column was despatched from San Salvador, led by Diego de Alvarado and supported by indigenous auxiliaries. They found three or four allied native groups had set up a defensive position upon the strongly fortified Peñol de Cinacantan ("Rock of Cinacantan", now known as Cerro Redondo); at least one of the groups was Pipil, and possibly all of them. The sides of the fortress were shear, except for a single approach that was strongly defended. As the Spanish party attempted to storm the fortress, the natives threw rocks down upon them, and showered them with arrows and spears. On the first day, Spanish assaults were twice beaten back. Seeing that the fortress could not easily be taken, the Spanish built a wooden siege engine, which greatly impressed the defenders. One of the native lords called a truce and asked the Spanish to return to San Salvador, and promised that the rebellious Indians would arrive to swear loyalty to the King of Spain. The attackers believed this to be a trick, and launched a new attack using their newly built siege tower. They breached the fortifications and killed many of the defenders, while many others fled in terror. Once the fortress had fallen, the defeated Pipil defenders were given in encomienda to the inhabitants of San Salvador; the inhabitants were probably reduced to Tamanique.

=== Inter-Spanish rivalry, 1529–1530 ===
In 1529, Pedrarias Dávila sent an expedition led by Martín de Estete to annex the territory of El Salvador to his domains in neighbouring Nicaragua, going so far as to distribute the unconquered natives of the Gulf of Fonseca in encomienda to his followers. At the time, Diego de Rojas was in command of the Spanish forces attempting to pacify indigenous resistance centred on Popocatepet. In January or February 1530, Martín de Estete captured Rojas, and marched on San Salvador, but was unable to gain the support of the residents there, and set up camp at Perulapan (modern San Martín Perulapán), just to the south, which he called Ciudad de los Caballeros ("City of the Knights"). The acting governor of Guatemala, Francisco de Orduña, sent his captain Francisco López at the head of an expedition to drive out the interlopers. López left Santiago de los Caballeros de Guatemala in March 1530 with thirty cavalry, and an unspecified body of infantry. The residents of San Salvador rose up in arms to join the relief force; Estete abandoned his camp and retreated towards Nicaragua, taking with him 2,000 enslaved Cuzcatlecos. López pursued Estete and caught up with his forces after crossing the Lempa River. Estete and his second-in-command fled for Nicaragua, and his soldiers surrendered to López. Diego de Rojas was freed, and the slaves recovered. This intervention put an end to Pedrarias Dávila's hopes of securing El Salvador as part of Nicaragua.

=== Eastern El Salvador, 1530–1538 ===
In order to defend against further rival Spanish incursions from the southeast, Pedro de Alvarado established the Spanish town of San Miguel, which he also used as a base of operations for attacks against the Lenca. A Spanish force commanded by Luis de Moscoso Alvarado, consisting of about 120 Spanish cavalry, accompanied by infantry and Indian auxiliaries, crossed the Lempa River and founded San Miguel on 21 November 1530. In addition to the Spanish colonists, the settlement included Mexica and Tlaxcalan allies, among other Indian auxiliaries. Most of the Spanish population of San Miguel abandoned El Salvador with Pedro de Alvarado when he set out on his expedition to Peru.

Cristóbal de la Cueva, under orders from Jorge de Alvarado in Guatemala, had entered Honduras with about 40 men to establish a new port and road to Guatemala, and to put down a native uprising there. He was challenged by Andrés de Cerezeda, governor of Honduras, and eventually marched south to San Miguel with his men, bringing an urgently needed influx of new colonists. San Miguel was refounded as San Miguel de la Frontera by Cristóbal de la Cueva on 15 April 1535. De la Cueva brought the area back within the jurisdiction of Guatemala, although the governor of Honduras vigorously protested. Eastern El Salvador, centred on the town of San Miguel, became the Province of San Miguel, which included the territory of the pre-Columbian province of Chaparrastique.

In early 1537, San Miguel was isolated by a general Lenca uprising that spread south from Honduras. A native army laid siege to San Miguel over the course of three days from 27 March. Their surprise attack caught many of the inhabitants defenceless, and 50–60 Spanish colonists were killed, more than half of the Spaniards then resident in the town. After three days the attackers were repulsed by reinforcements that were passing through from Guatemala en route to Peru, with the help of a detachment from San Salvador under the command of Antonio de Quintanilla. This uprising enveloped the territory of El Salvador, led by the Lenca ruler Lempira, and focused upon the Peñol de Cerquín, about 80 kilometres (50 mi) north of San Salvador, within Honduras. Francisco de Montejo, then governor of Honduras, urgently appealed to San Salvador for reinforcements and supplies. Montejo sent twenty Spaniards supported by native auxiliaries south towards the Valley of Xocorro, within the jurisdictional claim of San Miguel, but a scouting party was captured by the Spaniards resident there, and Montejo's column withdrew back to Honduras; en route to Comayagua they were attacked by a Lenca force, and killed almost to a man.

The inhabitants of San Salvador, alarmed by the uprising engulfing the region, responded by sending a great quantity of weapons, armour, gunpowder, and other supplies to Francisco de Montejo in Honduras. They also sent 100 Indian auxiliaries, with 1,000 native porters. Further supplies were forthcoming from the embattled residents of San Miguel. By the end of 1538, Lempira's stronghold had been taken by the Spanish, and Montejo crossed from Honduras to San Miguel to assist in putting down continued indigenous resistance in the district.

== Colonial organisation ==
By 1539, the Spanish advances in El Salvador were sufficient that Cuzcatlan was considered fully pacified. In the immediate aftermath of the Spanish conquest, the conquistadors sought wealth through slaving and mining, but both of these industries soon faltered, and the colonists instead turned to agriculture. In 1545, San Salvador was moved to its current location, and on 27 September 1546, it was elevated in status to a city. El Salvador originally formed three administrative divisions, those of Sonsonate (Izalcos), San Salvador (Cuzcatlan), and San Miguel. Sonsonate was an alcaldía mayor, while San Salvador, San Miguel, and Choluteca (now in Honduras) formed the alcaldía mayor of San Salvador. From 1524, all of these fell within the jurisdiction of Santiago de los Caballeros de Guatemala. In 1542, this jurisdiction was reorganised as the Real Audiencia de Guatemala, and later the Captaincy General of Guatemala. Ecclesiastically, all of El Salvador fell within the Roman Catholic diocese of Guatemala. The native inhabitants of the Izalco region of El Salvador, famed for its prodigious production of cacao, were among the most heavily exploited in the whole Spanish Empire. By the end of the 16th century, this had led to the collapse of cacao production in the province.

== Historical sources ==
The Annals of the Cakchiquels, an indigenous document from the Guatemalan Highlands, contains an account of Pedro de Alvarado's initial incursion into El Salvador. Pedro de Alvarado wrote four letters to Hernán Cortés describing his conquest of Guatemala and El Salvador, of which two survive. One of these relates his expedition into El Salvador, with an eye to military detail. It is of particular use in its description of tactics and weaponry, although it is disdainful of the native culture.

== See also ==
- Atlácatl
- Spanish conquest of Guatemala
- Spanish conquest of Honduras
- Spanish conquest of Nicaragua
