= Gonzalo de Alvarado y Chávez =

Spanish conquistador

Gonzalo de Alvarado y Chávez was a Spanish conquistador and cousin of Pedro de Alvarado and accompanied him on his first campaign in Guatemala. In 1525 he was appointed chief constable of Santiago de los Caballeros de Guatemala, the new capital (modern Tecpán Guatemala). He married Isabel, a daughter of Jorge de Alvarado, his cousin. It is not known when he died.
