= Pipil people =

Nahua ethnic group of El Salvador

Nahua
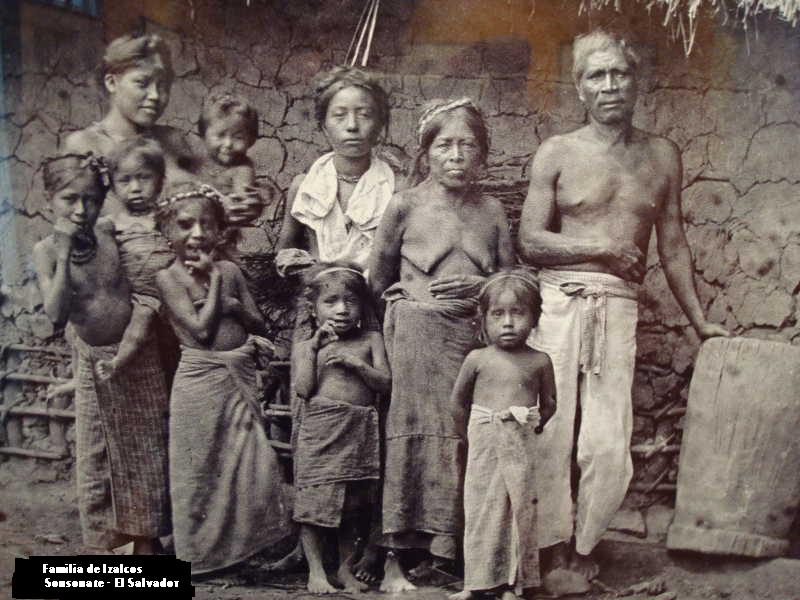
- Nahua family in Sonsonate, El Salvador

Regions with significant populations
- Western and central El Salvador, Western Nicaragua
- El Salvador: 29,445
- Nicaragua: 20,000
- Honduras: 6,388
- Costa Rica: ~1,000

Languages
- Nawat, Spanish

Religion
- Christianity (predominantly Catholic) and traditional indigenous beliefs

Related ethnic groups
- Nahuas, Nicarao people, Lenca

The Pipil or Náhuat are an Indigenous group of Mesoamerican people inhabiting the western and central areas of present-day El Salvador and Nicaragua. They are a subgroup of the larger Nahua ethnic group, and are closely related to the Nicarao people, considered a subgroup of the Pipil. They speak the Nawat language, which is a closely related but distinct language from the Nahuatl of Central Mexico. There are very few speakers of Nawat left, but there are efforts being made to revitalize it. Their cosmology is related to that of the Toltec, Maya and Lenca.

At the time of the Spanish conquest, the Pipil were largely concentrated in Cuzcatlan, covering most of western El Salvador. Pipil populations were also present in Guatemala, and likely in various parts of Honduras. The Nawat language has already gone extinct in Guatemala and Honduras, but there is a small population of acculturated Nahuas in the Olancho Department of eastern Honduras.

== History ==
Map of El Salvador's indigenous peoples at the time of the Spanish conquest: 1. Pipil (Nahua), 2. Lenca, 3. Kakawira o Cacaopera, 4. Xinca, 5. Maya Ch'orti' people, 6. Maya Poqomam people, 7. Mangue/Chorotega

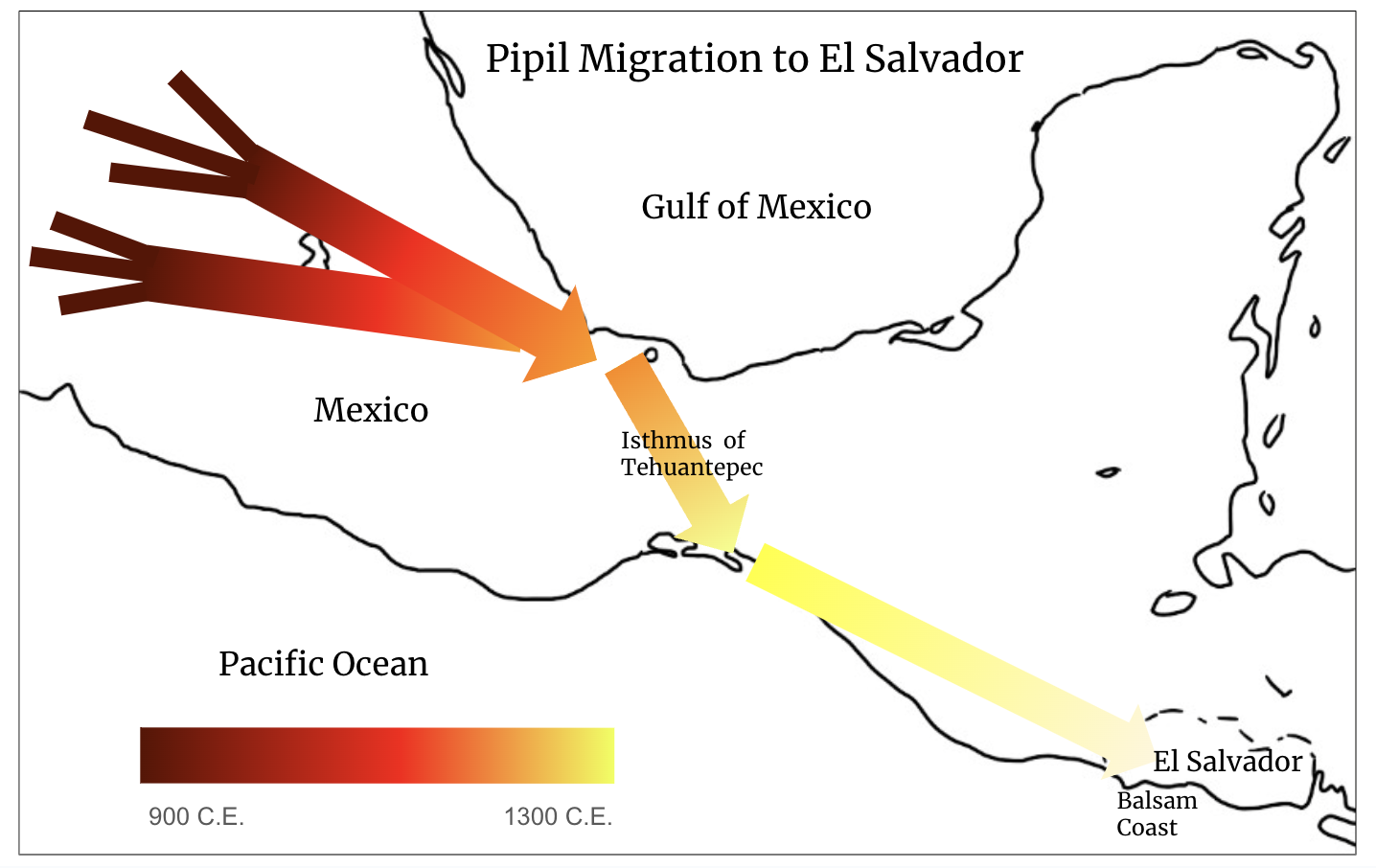
Estimated paths of the Pipil migration to El Salvador

Indigenous accounts recorded by Spanish chronicler Gonzalo Francisco de Oviedo suggest that the Pipil of El Salvador migrated from present-day Mexico to their current locations beginning around the 8th century AD. They traveled from current day central Mexico to the Gulf coast. After a short period of time, they then travelled southwards through the Isthmus of Tehuantepec, ending their journey on the Balsam Coast of El Salvador. As they settled in the area, they founded the city-state of Kūskatan, which was already home to various groups including the Lenca, Xinca, Ch'orti', and Poqomam. Around the same time, a group of Pipils migrated further south and settled in the Gran Nicoya region of Nicaragua and Costa Rica, where this subgroup of Pipils eventually became known as the Nicaraos.

The Nahua, a cohesive group sharing a central Mexican culture, are said to have migrated to Central America during the Late Classic and Early Postclassic period. The Nahua are linguistically tied to the Aztec, so it is likely that both were descended from the Toltecs. The tenth, eleventh, and twelfth centuries saw a Nahua diaspora across Central America, which the Pipil were a part of.

The Pipil organized the confederacy of Kūskatan, with at least two centralized city-states that may have been subdivided into smaller principalities. A common feature of Nahua societies was a grouping of settlements who all had symmetric relationships with the others, rather than one dominant city. They were also competent workers in cotton textiles and developed a wide-ranging trade network for woven goods as well as agricultural products. Their cultivation of cacao, centered in the Izalco area and involving a vast and sophisticated irrigation system, was especially lucrative, and trade reached as far north as Teotihuacan and south to Costa Rica.

Near the coast, cotton and indigo were produced as well as cacao. However, a rival confederation of the Tz'utujil and K'iche people began to settle that area, in a deliberate attempt to control the resources of the area. This may be the reason that archeological evidence of continuous Pipil occupation is lacking compared with other cultures that had more permanent stays in the same areas.

When their presence was documented by the Spanish in the 16th century, they were identified as "Pipil" and located in the present area of western El Salvador, as well as Escuintla and Asuncion Mita in Guatemala. Poqomam Maya settlements were interspersed around the area of Chalchuapa. Other possible Pipil enclaves include Ocotepeque, Nito (Maya site), Naco in the Honduran department of Santa Bárbara, Chapagua, the Comayagua valley, Agalteca, Olancho, Usulután and Nacaome. Although a Nahua/Pipil presence is noted in colonial times around San Cristóbal Acasaguastlán, Lyle Campbell argues this is due to post-conquest forced population movements.

Some urban centers developed into present-day cities, such as Sonsonate and Ahuachapán. Ruins in Aguilares and those close to the Guazapa volcano are considered to have been Nahua establishments.

== Language, etymology, and synonymy ==
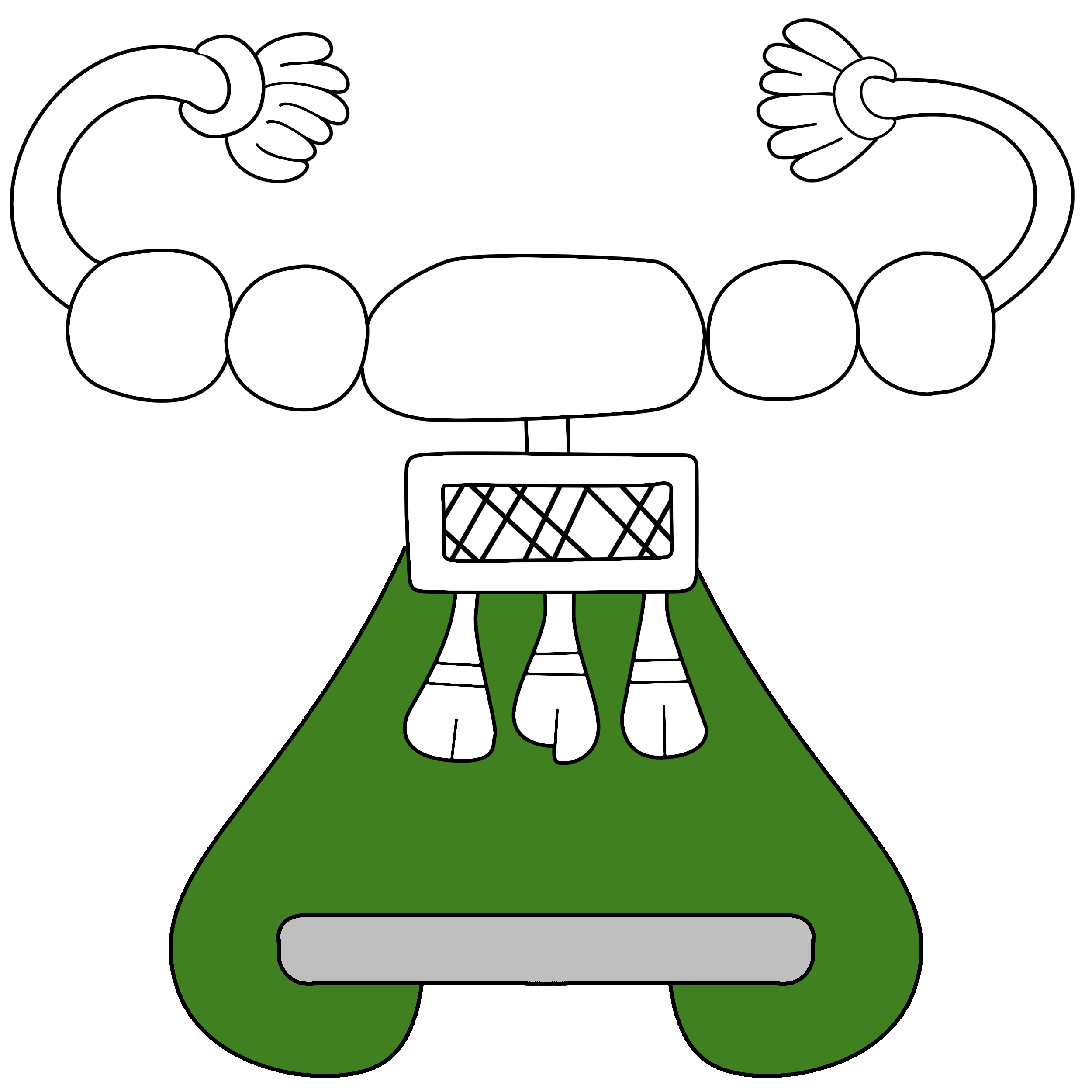
The seal of Kuskatan based on the "Lienzo de Tlaxcala" with the symbol of an altepetl

The term Nahua is a cultural and ethnic term used for Nahuan-speaking groups. Though they are Nahua, the term Pipil is the term that is most commonly encountered in anthropological and linguistic literature. This exonym derives from the closely related Nahuatl word pil (meaning 'boy'). The term Pipil has often been explained as originating as a derogatory reference made by the Aztecs, who presumably regarded the Nawat language as a childish version of their own language, Nahuatl. However, the Nahua do not refer to themselves as Pipil. There is evidence that the Pipil were able to understand Nahuatl, as the Spanish were able to communicate with Pipil they encountered in Nahuatl. Because many different groups could speak it, Nahuatl was used as a "vehicular language" at that time so that groups with non-mutually intelligible languages could communicate. However, unlike in Nahuatl, honorifics for religious concepts in Pipil do not include complex honorifics added to nouns, prepositions, and verbs. This may have been one reason why the Aztecs believed they spoke a degraded version of Nahuatl. Because of these linguistic traits regarding religion, when Spanish evangelicals came to indoctrinate Pipil, the Pipil did not understand them until the friars learned their unique patterns.

Archaeologist William Fowler notes that the term Pipil can be translated as 'noble' and surmises that the invading Spanish and their Indian auxiliaries, the Tlaxcala, used the name as a reference to the population's elite, known as the Pipiltin. The Pipiltin were land owners and composed a sovereign society state during the Toltec expansion.

For most authors, the term Pipil or Nawat (Nahuat) is used to refer to the language in Central America only (i.e., excluding Mexico). However, the term (along with the synonymous Eastern Nahuatl) has also been used to refer to Nahuan language varieties in the southern Mexican states of Veracruz, Tabasco, and Chiapas, that, like the Nawat in El Salvador, have reduced the earlier /tl/ sound to a /t/. The varieties spoken in these three areas do share greater similarities with Nawat than the other Nahuan varieties do, which suggests a closer connection; however, Campbell (1985) considers Nawat distinct enough to be a language separate from the Nahuan branch, thus rejecting an Eastern Nahuatl subgrouping that includes Nawat.

Dialects of Nawat include the following:

- Izalco
- Nahuizalco
- Panchimalco
- Cuisnahuat
- Santo Domingo de Guzmán
- Santa Catarina Mazagua
- Teotepeque
- Tacuba
- Ataco
- Jicalapa
- Comazagua
- Chiltiupan

Today, Nawat is seldom used by the general population. It is mostly used in rural areas, mostly as phrases sustained in households, such as in the Sonsonate and Ahuachapán departments. Cuisnahuat and Santo Domingo de Guzmán have the highest concentration of Nawat speakers. Campbell's 1985 estimate (fieldwork 1970–1976) was 200 remaining speakers although as many as 2000 speakers have been recorded in official Mexican reports. Gordon (2005) reports only 20 speakers (from 1987). The exact number of Native Nawat speakers is difficult to determine because many speakers have wished to remain unidentified, this is due to historic government repression of indigenous Salvadorans. The most known example of this being La Matanza ("The Massacre") of 1932, where an estimated 40,000 indigenous Salvadorans were executed by the government. This event caused many indigenous Salvadorans who survived to stop passing on their Native language, traditions, and other cultural practices to their descendants. Many also stopped wearing traditional indigenous clothing out of fear.

== Spanish conquest ==
In the early 16th century, the Spanish conquistadores ventured into Central America from Mexico, then known as the Spanish colony of New Spain. After subduing the highland Mayan city-states through battle and cooptation, the Spanish sought to extend their dominion to the lower pacific region of the Nahua, then dominated by the powerful city-state of Cuscatlán. Pedro de Alvarado, a lieutenant of Hernán Cortés, led the first Spanish invasion in June 1524. He was accompanied by thousands of Tlaxcala and Cakchiquel allies, who had long been rivals of Cuzcatlan for control over their wealthy cacao-producing region. The Nahua warriors met the Spanish forces in two major open battles that sent the Spanish army retreating to Guatemala. The Spaniards eventually returned with reinforcements. The surviving Cuscatlán forces retreated into the mountains, where they sustained a guerrilla war against the allies of the Spanish, who had occupied the city of Cuscatlán. Unable to defeat this resistance, and with Pedro de Alvarado nursing a painful leg wound from an arrow in the first battle in Acajutla beach, Diego de Alvarado was forced to lead the rest of the conquest. Two subsequent Spanish expeditions were required to achieve the complete defeat of Cuzcatan, in 1525 and again in 1528.

According to legend, a Nahua cacique or lord named Atlácatl and Atonal led the Pipil forces against first contact with the Spanish, the most famous battle being the Battle of Acajutla led by Atonal. The Annals of the Cakchiquels mentions the name "Pan Atacat" (water men), in reference to coastal Nahua (this may have been a title for war chiefs or coastal warriors).

At the start of colonization, the Pipil continued in some senses their own way of life after the Spanish conquest. This was due to the economic system the Spaniards put in place in El Salvador. Settling mostly in the western side of El Salvador they incorporated the indigenous populations into their new social and political order. The Spaniards collected and sold the products indigenous people produced, as the indigenous populations were much better at cultivating the native crops in the region, namely the lucrative cacao plant. However, their cities were forced to realign themselves into grid plan cities according to the Spanish custom. In Ciudad Vieja, a settlement containing many Pipil as well as Spaniards, many examples of Pipil pottery and obsidian artifacts were found, as well as metalwork that was clearly of Spanish origin. The dense, grid plan city was ruled by the Spanish, but many Pipil living there made a life in which they continued to keep in touch with their indigenous customs. For the Pipil population that stayed inside the Spanish rule they were forced to stop native crop cultivate and start farming Cacao. The Spanish also passed a tax on the Cacao from the family heads, by 1590 the Pipil population was 20% of what it was pre conquest.

While some Pipil continued to live in strongholds in Western and Central El Salvador, by 1892 reports say most of the population in El Salvador was Spanish monolingual. This was attributed to it being easier to learn Spanish and have a chance of making it out of the Pipil communities and fully assimilate into the now Spanish El Salvador instead of living under the oppressive taxes and work.

The Spanish were dedicated to the chronicling of the people who they were colonizing, and as such wrote at length about the Pipil. However, many of the sources are of unknown accuracy, as some do not cite any sources, and some carry obvious biases. Despite this, several sources have good information that historians have referred to in the absence of the original manuscripts to which they refer, many of which were destroyed by the Spanish.

After the Spanish victory, the Nahua of Kuskatan became vassals of the Spanish Crown and were no longer referred to as Pipiles by the Spanish but simply indios (Indians), in accordance with the Vatican "Discovery doctrine". The term Pipil has therefore remained associated, in mainstream Salvadoran rhetoric, with the pre-conquest indigenous culture. Today it is used by scholars to distinguish the indigenous population in El Salvador from other Nahua-speaking groups (e.g., in Nicaragua). However, neither the self-identified indigenous population nor its political movement, which has revived in recent decades, uses the term "pipil" to describe themselves but instead uses terms such as "Nawataketza" (a speaker of Nawat) or simply "indígenas" (indigenous).

== Pre-colonial culture ==
The Pipil calendar resembled that of the Aztecs, though some day names were changed: Pipil quiyahuitl "rain" for Aztec atl "water", P. teyolocuani "sorcerer" for A. ocelotl "jaguar", P. tecolotl "owl" for A. cozcacuauhtli "vulture", P. tecpilanahuatl for A. olin "movement/earthquake", P. ayotl "turtle" for A. quiyahuitl "rain".

Diego García de Palacio, writing in the late sixteenth century, explicitly mentioned that the Pipil worshipped Quetzalcoatl and Itzcueye (an earth-mother goddess originating from the Gulf Coast of Mexico). He also mentioned that they worshipped the sun and a god of hunting and fishing (possibly Mixcoatl). Archaeology points to Tlaloc, Mictlantecuhtli, and Xipe Totec as being other important deities among the Salvadoran Pipil, Xipe being a symbol of the warrior elite.

== Pipil Archaeology ==
The archaeological study of the broader Nahua peoples of Meso and Central America has been widespread and thorough. However, studies devoted to the Pipil specifically are rarer, but still important.

A bulk of Pipil focused archaeological research has gone into deciphering the exact migrational route that the Pipil took from central Mexico to El Salvador, and where exactly they first settled. This includes the tracking of their path to the Gulf Coast through remaining Nawat speakers and their traversal of the Isthmus of Mexico. Much of the research on this topic has also sought to illuminate why they chose the Western Balsam coast as their destination, and why they migrated at all. Escamilla Rodriguez has asserted that to a certain extent, the early pipil sites studied on the Balsam coast of El Salvador were changed and appropriated by the settlers as part of a diasporic migration process, maintaining their identities through alteration of their landscape.

Archeological study of Pipil art, especially through the 16th and 17th centuries, has also been thorough. Apart from the study of traditional art, archaeologists have looked at the development of Pipil artisanship through Spanish colonization. During Spanish colonization, when Pipil artisans were indentured to the conquistadors, studies have found that much of their traditional pottery was influenced by the European trends brought in by the Spanish. Analysis showed how even though the pottery created by the Pipil artists was ornamented with traditional indigenous decoration, the forms of the pieces themselves were frequently European. Jeb Card sites this artistic influence as evidence for ethnogenesis during the long rule of the Spanish.

Pipil writing forms, apart from being analyzed linguistically, have also been studied archaeologically as a fundamental part of unique Pipil culture. Archaeologists analyzing Pipil writings have discovered strong emphasis on currency and commodity, pointing towards an economically advanced pre-colonial culture. Kathryn Sempeck, among others, upholds Pipil’s unique style of writing, especially involving politics and economics, as a deliberate demonstrator of Pipil independence and cultural separation from the Aztec and the Mixtec, with whom they share a geographic origin.

== Pipil political resistance ==
In 1881 there were several small rebellions launched, after the Salvadorean government passed a decree that abolished the ejido system and the tieras comunales, communal common lands where Pipil continued to farm their crops and pay tribute to the government. This effectively placed all Pipil people in poverty as they could no longer farm.

La Matanza: In 1932 the Pipil and communists (mostly Salvadorean peasants wanting land reform) started a rebellion against the Salvadorean government and their well-trained and armed army. The government responded with the indiscriminate massacre of a conservatively estimated 30,000 indigenous people over the course of a few days. Peasants were rounded up, arms tied behind their back, and shot. According to U.S. historian of the massacre Thomas Anderson, "The extermination was so great that they could not be buried fast enough, and a great stench of rotting flesh permeated the air of Western El Salvador."

Today the Pipil people still continue to resist oppression by spreading their culture and continuing traditional practices.

== Modern Nahua culture ==
Popular accounts of the Nahua have had a strong influence on the national oral histories of El Salvador, with a large portion of the population claiming ancestry from the Pipil and other groups. Some 86% of today's Salvadorans self-report as Mestizos (people of mixed Amerindian and European descent). A small percentage (estimated by the government at 1 percent, by UNESCO at 2 percent, and by scholars at between 2 and 4 percent) is of solely or nearly solely indigenous ancestry, although the numbers are disputed for political reasons. There are still Natives who speak Nawat (Nahuat) and follow traditional ways of life. They live mainly in the southwest part of the country in small villages, but numerous self-identified indigenous populations live in other areas, such as the Nonualcos south of the capital and the Lenca in the east.

Remaining self-identified Salvadorian native cultures other than the Pipil include the Lenca, Pokoman, Chorti, and Ulva peoples. The Pipil, however, are descendants of the central Mexican peoples who would form the Aztecs, making them unique in cultural history to other native peoples currently situated in El Salvador. The Pipil remain the only substantial population of central Mexican-originating peoples in El Salvador.

In the mid 1900s the majority of people in El Salvador believed there was no indigenous peoples left in El Salvador as the majority of education in Central America emphasized a blended Mestizo culture that could unite countries through the struggles of development and civil wars. With most in the capital of San Salvador saying there wa no't any left in the whole of El Salvador, this was not the case as estimates of indigenous populations in 1975 were that of around 500,000 making up approximately 10 percent of the Salvadorean population. In this time period archeologists and anthropologists called the indigenous peoples of El Salvador an Invisible population similar to how blacks were treated in the US.

According to a special report in El Diario de Hoy, due to preservation and revitalization efforts of various non-profit organizations in conjunction with several universities, combined with a post-civil war resurgence of Nahua identity in the country of El Salvador, the number of Nawat speakers rose from 200 in the 1980s to 3,000 speakers in 2009. The vast majority of these speakers are young people, a fact that may allow the language to be pulled from the brink of extinction. Nawat (Nahuat) language revitalization efforts are currently being made today, in and outside of El Salvador.

There is also a renewed interest in the preservation of traditional indigenous customs and other indigenous cultural practices, as well as a greater willingness by indigenous Salvadoran communities to perform their ceremonies in public, and to wear traditional indigenous clothing without fear of government repression. Traditional Pipil cuisine is gaining popularity, known of its use of unique flavor combinations and natural ingredients like corn, green tomatoes and chilis including pupusas (see Pupusa) and atol de elote.

== Notable Nahua of El Salvador ==
- Anastasio Aquino (1792–1833), Tagateku Nonualco war chief
- Prudencia Ayala (1885–1936), Indigenous rights activist
- Feliciano Ama (1881–1932), Izalco chief
- Francisco "Chico" Sánchez, Juayua Chief
- Nantzin Paula López Witzapan, poet and Nawat linguist (1959–2016)
- Alicia Maria Siu, muralist.

== See also ==
- El Mozote massacre (1981), perpetrated by the Salvadoran Army during the Salvadoran Civil War.
- Annals of the Cakchiquels (1571), a manuscript written in the indigenous Kaqchikel language.
- Pipil language
- Pipil grammar

== Bibliography ==
- Bierhorst, John. The Mythology of Mexico and Central America. William Morrow, New York, 1990. ISBN 0-688-11280-3.
- Carrasco, David, Editor in chief. The Oxford encyclopedia of Mesoamerican cultures: the civilizations of Mexico and Central America, in four volumes. Oxford University Press, New York, 2001. ISBN 0-19-510815-9 (set).
- Campbell, Lyle. (1978). Middle American languages. in L. Campbell & Marianne Mithun (Eds.), The languages of native America: Historical and comparative assessment (pp. 902–1000). Austin: University of Texas Press.
- Campbell, Lyle. (1985). The Pipil language of El Salvador. Mouton grammar library (No. 1). Berlin: Mouton Publishers.
- Campbell, Lyle. (1997). American Indian languages: The historical linguistics of Native America. New York: Oxford University Press. ISBN 0-19-509427-1.
- Chapman, Anne M. (1960). Los nicarao y los chorotega según las fuentes históricas. Publicaciones de la Universidad de Costa Rica, Serie historia y geografía 4. San José: Ciudad Universitaria.
- Clavijero, Francisco Xavier. (1974 [1775]). Historia Antigua de México. Mexico: Editorial Porrúa.
- Fernández de Oviedo y Valdés, Gonzalo. (1945 [1557]). Historia general y natural de las Indias, Islas y Tierrafirme del mar de Océano. J. Amador de los Ríos (ed). Asunción, Paraguay: Editorial Guaraní.
- Fowler, William R. (1981). The Pipil-Nicarao of Central America. (Unpublished PhD dissertation, Department of Archaeology, University of Calgary).
- Fowler, William R. (1983). La distribución prehistórica e histórica de los pipiles. Mesoamérica, 6, 348-372.
- de Fuentes y Guzmán, Francisco Antonio. (1932–1933 [1695]). Recordación Florida: Discurso historial y demostración natural, material, militar y política del Reyno de Guatemala. J. A. Villacorta, R. A. Salazar, & S. Aguilar (Eds.). Biblioteca "Goathemala" (Vols. 6-8). Guatemala: Sociedad de Geografía e Historia.
- Raymond G. Gordon Jr. (Ed.). (2005). Ethnologue: Languages of the world (15th ed.). Dallas, Texas: SIL International. ISBN 1-55671-159-X. (Online version: www.ethnologue.com).
- Ixtlilxochitl, Don Fernando de Alva. (1952 [1600-1611]). Obras históricas de Don Fernando de Alva Ixtlixochitl, publicadas y anotadas pro Alfredo Chavero. Mexico: Editoria Nacional, S.A.
- Jiménez Moreno, Wigberto. (1959). Síntesis de la historia pretoleca de Mesoamérica., Esplendor del México antiguo (Vol. 2, pp. 1019–1108). Mexico.
- Jiménez Moreno, Wigberto. (1966). Mesoamerica before the Tolteca. In J. Paddock (Ed.), Ancient Oaxaca (pp. 4–82). Stanford: Stanford University Press.
- Lastra de Suarez, Yolanda. 1986. Las áreas dialectales del náhuatl modern. Mexico: Instituto de Investigaciones Antropológicas, Universidad Nacional Autónoma de México.
- Lehmann, Walter. (1920). Zentral-Amerika. Berlin: Dietrich Reimer.
- Miguel León-Portilla. (1972). Religión de los nicaraos: Análisis y comparación de tradiciones culturales Nahua. Mexico: Instituto de Investigaciones Históricas, Universidad Nacional Autónoma de México.
- Squier, Ephraim George (1858). The States of Central America: Their Geography, Topography, Climate, Population, Resources, Productions, Commerce, Political Organization, Aborigines, etc., etc., Comprising Chapters on Honduras, San Salvador, Nicaragua, Costa Rica, Guatemala, Belize, the Bay Islands, the Mosquito Shore, and the Honduras Inter-Oceanic Railway (Revised and expanded ed.). New York: Harper & Brothers. OCLC 13436697.
- Stoll, Otto. (1958 [1884]). Zur Ethnographie der Republik Guatemala (Etnografía de Guatemala). Seminaro de Integración Social Guatemalteca publication 8.
- Thompson, J. Eric S. (1948). An archaeological reconnaissance in the Cotzumalhuapa region, Escuintla, Guatemala. Carnegie Institution of Washington, Contributions to American anthropology and history (44). Cambridge, Massachusetts.
- Tilley, Virginia. (2005). Seeing Indians: A Study of Race, Nation and Power in El Salvador. University of New Mexico Press.
- de Torquemada, Fray Juan. (1969 [1615]). Monarquía Indiana. Biblioteca Porrúa (Vols. 41-43). Mexico: Librería Porrúa
