= Feliciano Ama =

Salvadoran indigenous rebel leader

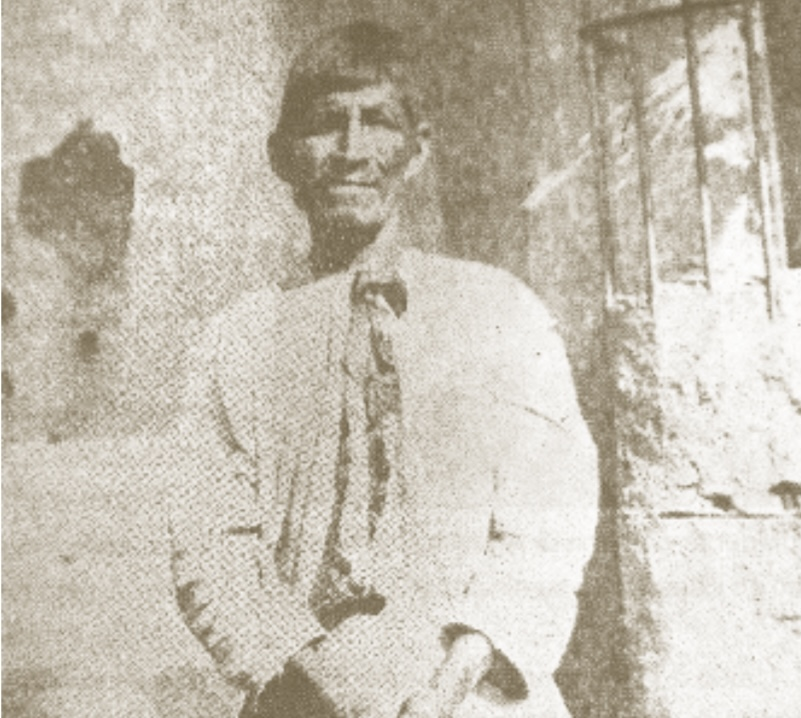
- Ama in 1932
- Born: José Feliciano de Jesús Ama Trampa; 1881; Izalco, El Salvador
- Died: 28 January 1932 (aged 50–51); Izalco, El Salvador
- Cause of death: Execution by hanging
- Known for: Being a rebel leader during La Matanza
- Spouse: Josefa Shupan

José Feliciano de Jesús Ama Trampa (1881 – 28 January 1932) was a Salvadoran Indigenous peasant leader and revolutionary who participated and died during La Matanza. Ama had his lands taken by the wealthy coffee planting family, the Regalados, during which he was hung by his thumbs and beaten. This was in the context of liberal reforms which stripped the indigenous population of access to their communal lands, which were appropriated by private landowners.

Ama was a day laborer in Izalco. He married Josefa Shupan, who came from an influential Pipil family in Izalco. In 1917, he became a member of the Catholic brotherhood Cofradía del Corpus Christi.

His father-in-law, Patricio Shupan, was mayordomo of the brotherhood, who died in 1917 after participating at a dinner with president Carlos Meléndez. After Shupan's death, Ama became head of the brotherhood, which consisted exclusively of Pipil.

In the early morning of 22 January 1932, Ama led the Pipil peasants of Izalco into the uprising against the landlords. With several hundred supporters he marched to the capital of the Sonsonate department. There, the mayor was killed by insurgents from Juayúa, but landlords accused Ama, who fled into the hills of Izalco. There, he was found by soldiers from the garrison of Izalco under commander Cabrera, captured, and hanged in the center of Izalco.

== See also ==
- Francisco "Chico" Sánchez
