= Jorge de Alvarado =

Spanish conquistador

Jorge de Alvarado y Contreras
- Born: 1480; Badajoz, Extremadura,
- Died: 1540 or 1541 (aged 60–61); Madrid
- Occupation: conquistador

Jorge de Alvarado y Contreras (born c.1480 Badajoz, Extremadura, Spain – died Madrid 1540 or 1541) was a Spanish conquistador, brother of the more famous Pedro de Alvarado.

== Biography and family ==
Jorge de Alvarado was a native of Badajoz and son of Gómez de Alvarado y Mexía de Sandoval, born in Badajoz around 1480 and vecino of Badajoz, Extremadura, Commander of Lobón, Puebla, Montijo and Cubillana, Alcalde of Montánchez, Trece of the Order of Santiago, Lord of Castellanos, Maestresala of Henry IV of Castile and General of the Frontier of Portugal, widower of Teresa Suárez de Moscoso y Figueroa, and second wife Leonor de Contreras y Gutiérrez de Trejo.

Alvarado went to Hispaniola in 1510 with all his older brothers Pedro and Gonzalo and younger brothers Gómez, Hernando and Juan and their uncle Diego de Alvarado y Mexía de Sandoval.

Jorge married a daughter of Xicotencatl I, the ruler of Tizatlan in Tlaxcala, as Pedro also did, probably to gain the support of Tlaxcalan troops. She was baptized with the Spanish name doña Lucía. They had a daughter, Francisca de Alvarado, who married the conquistador Francisco Xiron Manuel and had issue.

He was one of the conquerors of Mexico and Guatemala along with his brother, and Lieutenant-Governor of Guatemala under him. In 1527 he founded the city of Santiago de los Caballeros and the one of San Salvador in 1528.

Like his brother he also married twice, firstly to Francisca Girón and secondly in 1526 to Luisa de Estrada, certainly related to Francisco Vázquez de Coronado's wife, by whom he had a son Jorge de Alvarado y Estrada, born in México, who married Catalina de Villafañe y Carvajal, Mexican, daughter of Ángel de Villafañe, conqueror of Mexico, and wife Inés de Carvajal. Their son was Jorge de Alvarado y Villafañe, also born in Mexico, Governor and Captain-General of Honduras and Knight of Santiago since 1587, also married twice, firstly to Brianda de Quiñones and secondly to Juana de Benavides, vecina of Guatemala.
