= Ciudad Vieja, El Salvador =

Archeological site in El Salvador

Ciudad Vieja
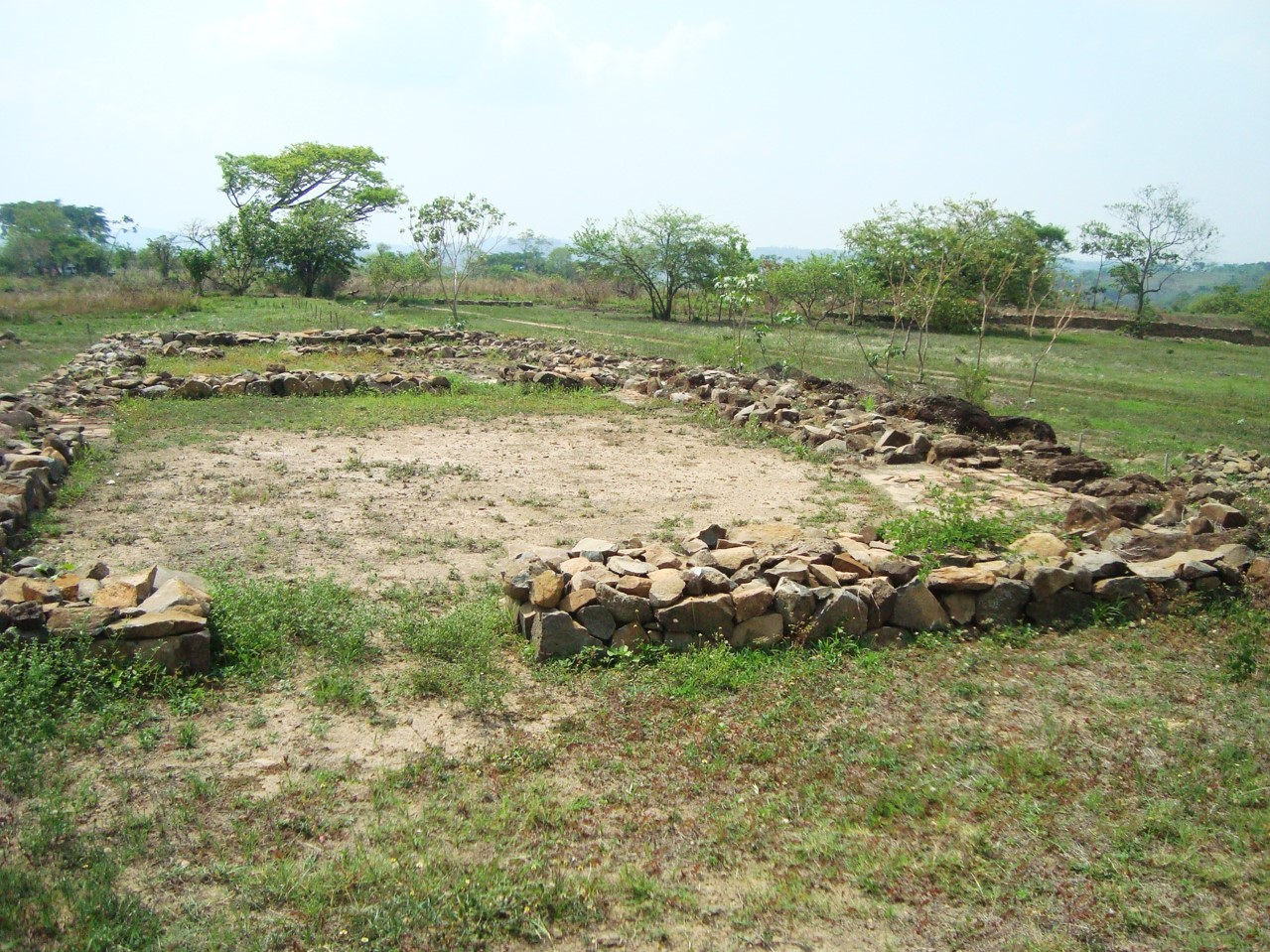
- Ruins of Ciudad Vieja

- Location in El Salvador
- 13°53′N 89°02′W
- Type: Settlement
- Periods: Spanish conquest of El Salvador
- Location: El Salvador
- Region: Cuscatlán Department

History
- Built: 1525
- Built by: Spanish conquistadors
- Abandoned: 1528

Site notes
- Condition: Ruined

Ciudad Vieja (Spanish for "Old City") is an archaeological site located roughly 10 km south of Suchitoto, in the Cuscatlán Department of central El Salvador. The site served as the first location of San Salvador, now the Central American nation's capital.

== Status as a World Heritage Site ==
This site was added to the UNESCO World Heritage Tentative List on 21 September 1992 in the cultural category.
