= Gonzalo de Alvarado =

Gonzalo de Alvarado y Contreras was a Spanish conquistador and brother of Pedro de Alvarado who participated in campaigns in Mexico, Guatemala, and El Salvador (co-founding its present capital, San Salvador).

Gonzalo de Alvarado was a native of Badajoz and son of Diego Gómez de Alvarado y Mexía de Sandoval, born in Badajoz in 1460 and vecino of Badajoz, Extremadura, Commander of Lobón, Puebla, Montijo and Cubillana, Alcalde of Montánchez, Trece of the Order of Santiago, Lord of Castellanos, Maestresala of Henry IV of Castile and General of the Frontier of Portugal, widow of Teresa Suárez de Moscoso y Figueroa, and second wife Leonor de Contreras y Gutiérrez de Trejo.

Alvarado y Contreras went to Hispaniola in 1510 with all his older brother Pedro and younger brothers Jorge, Gómez, Hernando and Juan and their uncle Diego de Alvarado y Mexía de Sandoval.

When Pedro de Alvarado was wounded on his left thigh and handicapped for the rest of his life he abandoned the war and appointed his brother, Gonzalo de Alvarado, to continue the task. In 1525 the conquest of El Salvador was completed and the city of San Salvador was established.

His descendants were represented by the family Vides de Alvarado after the famous 17th century historians Francisco Antonio de Fuentes y Guzmán and also the father Domingo Juarros y Montufar.
