= Castellanos de Zapardiel =

- municipality
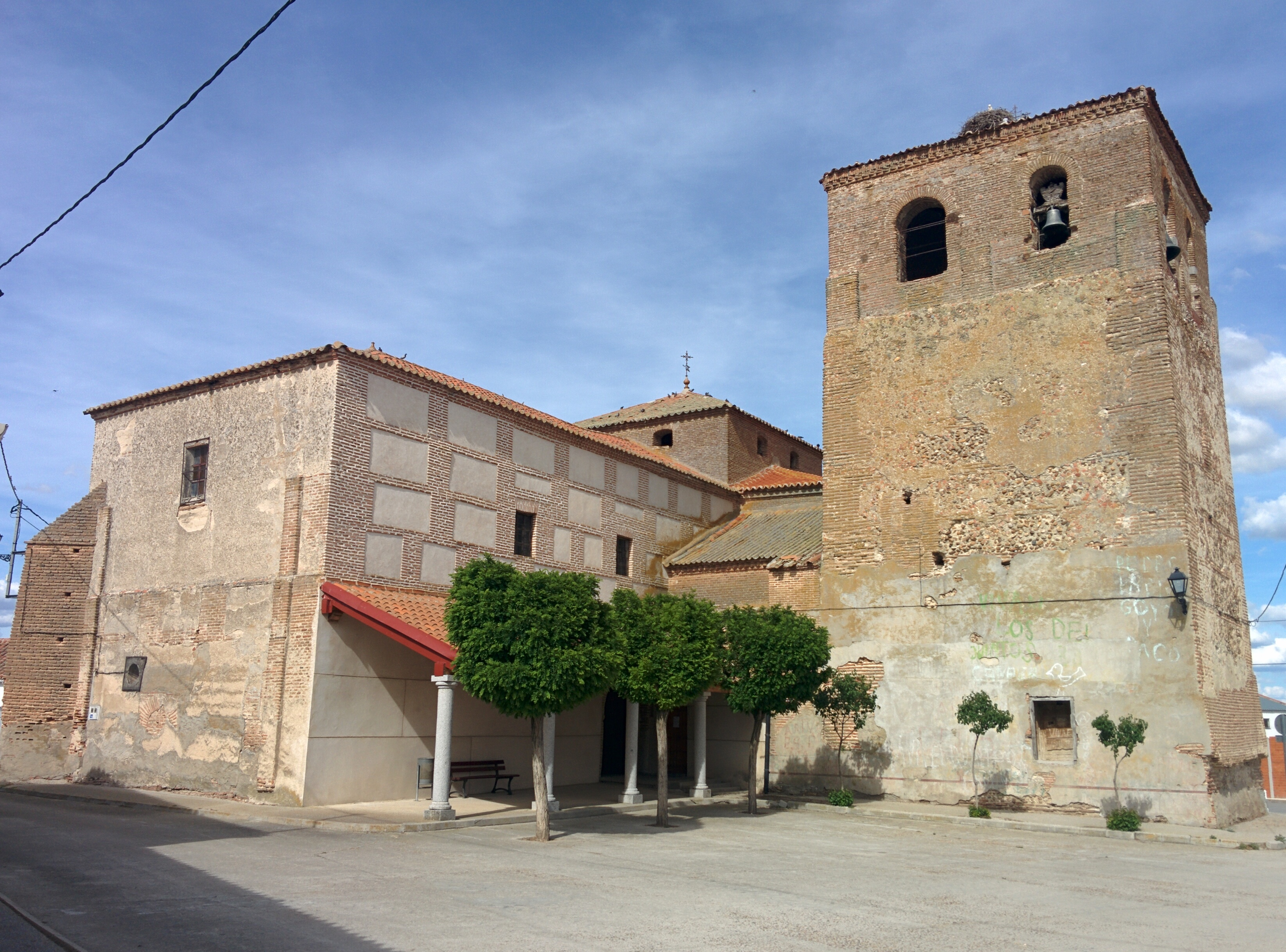
- Church of Santa María del Castillo

- Flag Coat of arms

- Location in Spain. Castellanos de Zapardiel (Spain)
- Coordinates: 41°05′07″N 4°54′35″W
- Country: Spain
- Autonomous community: Castile and León
- Province: Ávila
- Municipality: Castellanos de Zapardiel

Area
  - Total: 12.7 km^{2} (4.9 sq mi)
- Elevation: 784 m (2,572 ft)

Population (2025-01-01)
  - Total: 106
  - Density: 8.35/km^{2} (21.6/sq mi)
- Time zone: UTC+1 (CET)
  - Summer (DST): UTC+2 (CEST)
- Website: Official website

Castellanos de Zapardiel is a municipality located in the province of Ávila, Castile and León, Spain.

== Population ==
Historical population
Year	Pop.	±% p.a.
2023	135	—
2024	113	−16.30%
2025	106	−6.19%
Source: INE
