= Lobón =

- Municipality
- Coat of arms

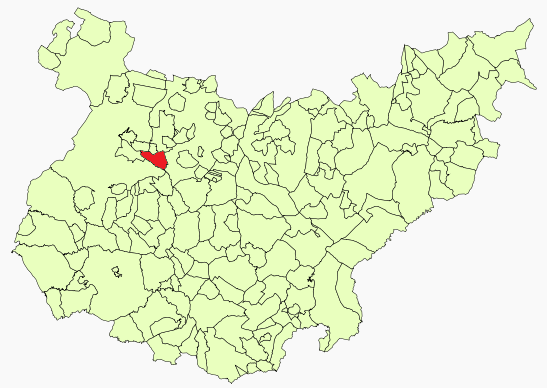
- Location in Badajoz

- Location of Lobón within Extremadura
- Coordinates: 38°51′0″N 6°37′27″W
- Country: Spain
- Autonomous Community: Extremadura
- Province: Badajoz
- Comarca: Tierra de Mérida - Vegas Bajas

Government
  - Mayor: Roberto Romero Gragera (PP)

Area
  - Total: 57.6 km^{2} (22.2 sq mi)
- Elevation (AMSL): 245 m (804 ft)

Population (2025-01-01)
  - Total: 2,756
  - Density: 47.8/km^{2} (124/sq mi)
- Time zone: UTC+1 (CET)
  - Summer (DST): UTC+2 (CEST (GMT +2))
- Postal code: 06498
- Area code: +34 (Spain) + 924 (Badajoz)
- Website: www.lobon.es

Lobón is a municipality located in the province of Badajoz, Extremadura, Spain. According to the 2012 census (INE), the municipality has a population of 2,869 inhabitants.

Apart from the town of Lobón itself, the other main population centre is Guadajira (population: 650; 2017).

== See also ==
- List of municipalities in Badajoz
