= Annals of the Cakchiquels =

Chronicle of pre-Columbian Guatemala

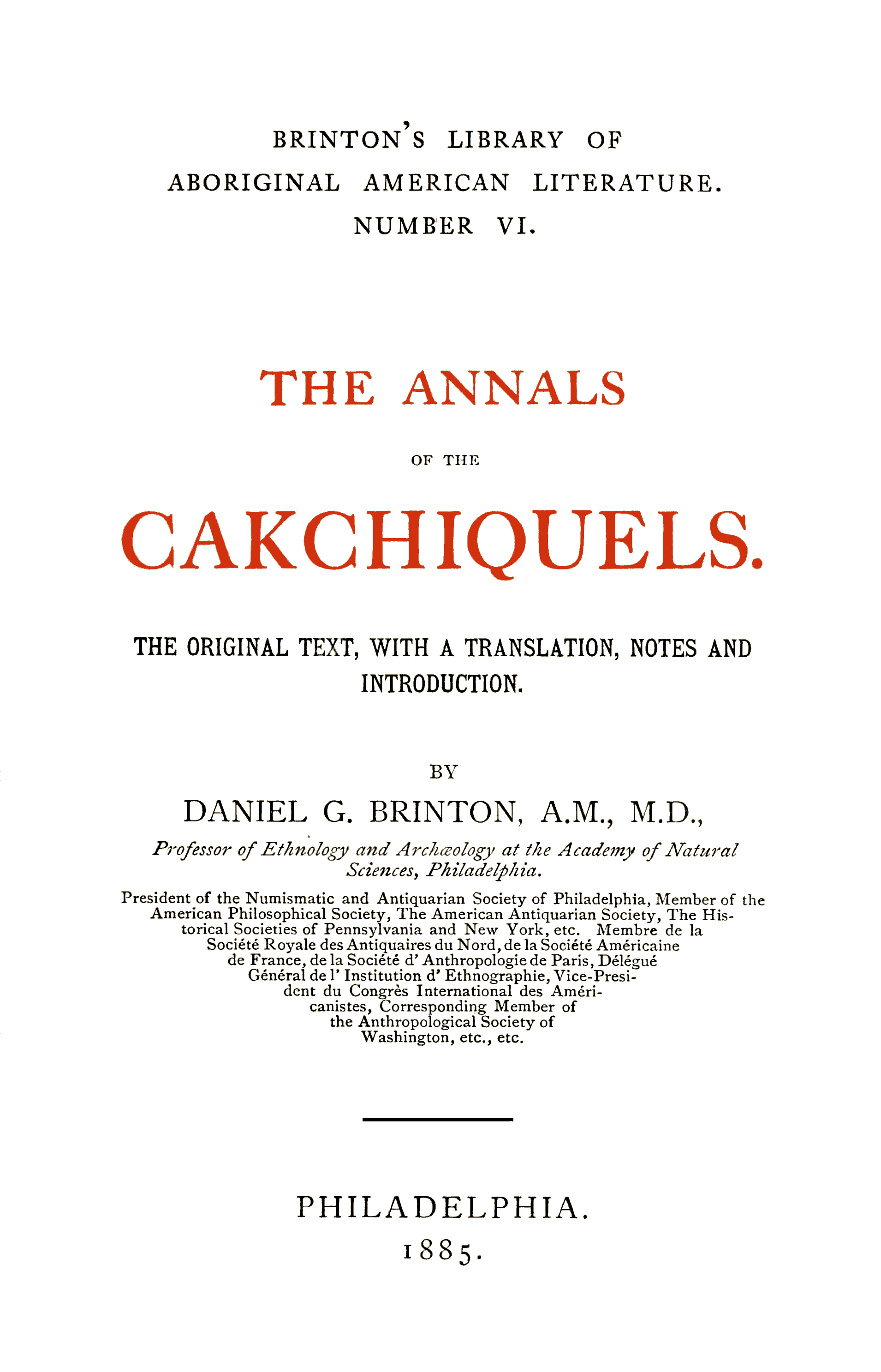
- Cover of the 1885 English edition
- Author: Francisco Hernández Arana Xajilá; Francisco Rojas
- Original title: Anales de los Cakchiqueles
- Translator: Charles Étienne Brasseur de Bourbourg; Daniel G. Brinton
- Language: Kaqchikel
- Subject: Kaqchikel history and myth
- Publication date: 1571–1604
- Publication place: Spanish Guatemala
- English publication date: 1885
- Media type: manuscript
- Dewey Decimal: 498
- LC Class: F1465.A53
- Text: Annals of the Cakchiquels at Wikisource

The Annals of the Cakchiquels (Spanish: Anales de los Cakchiqueles, also known by the alternative Spanish titles, Anales de los Xahil, Memorial de Tecpán-Atitlán or Memorial de Sololá) is a manuscript written in Kaqchikel by Francisco Hernández Arana Xajilá in 1571, and completed by his grandson, Francisco Rojas, in 1604. The manuscript—which describes the legends of the Kaqchikel nation and has historical and mythological components—is considered an important historical document on post-classic Maya civilization in the highlands of Guatemala.

The manuscript, initially kept by the Xahil lineage in the town of Sololá in Guatemala, was later discovered in the archives of the San Francisco de Guatemala convent in 1844. It was subsequently translated by the abbot Charles Étienne Brasseur de Bourbourg in 1855 (the same translator of the Rabinal Achí), and then passed through several more hands before being published in an English translation by Daniel G. Brinton in 1885.

The mythical and legendary part of the manuscript, which must have been orally preserved for centuries, was finally collected and preserved by members of the Xahil chinamit or lineage. The historical narrative continues with the exploits of kings and warriors and their various conquests, the founding of villages, and the succession of rulers up to the time of the Spanish Conquest.

Like the Popol Vuh, the Annals also identifies the almost legendary Tulan as the place from which they all set out, at least at one point in their various migrations. The texts differs from the other sources, such as the Historia de los Xpantzay de Tecpán Guatemala and Título de Totonicapán, but mainly from the Popol Vuh, in that it relates that the Kaqchikel ancestors came to Tulan, chʼaqa palow "across the sea", from r(i) uqajibʼal qʼij, "where the sun descends, the west". The Kaqchikel narrative is quite gloomy, describing the forefather's departure from Tulan accompanied by a negative omen and the presaging of death and dismay. It also refers to the Kʼicheʼ rulers forcing the King Qʼuicab the Great to leave Chaiviar (Chichicastenango), and migrate to the Ratzamut Mountains to found Iximché, which remained the new Kaqchikel capital until the arrival of the conquistadores. The Kaqchikel document continues with an account of their journeys and the places through which they passed along the way, ending with a sober, factual account of the Conquest. This is the native story of the Conquest of Guatemala from the point of view of the vanquished.
