= Diriangén =

Nicaraguan tribal leader

Diriangén was a native Nicaraguan king who controlled land from Diriamba in Carazo to the Ochomogo river in Rivas, outside the boundaries of Macuilmiquiztli's Nahua chiefdom of Kwawkapolkan, as well as the Nahua chiefdom of Kakawatan, also located in Rivas, ruled by chief Wemak. Diriangen belonged to the Chorotegas, an Otomanguean-speaking people who arrived in Nicaragua in 800 AD after they migrated from central and southern Mexico in 600 AD.

== Etymology ==
Diriangén was a portmanteau of the words Dirian ("people of the hills") — the tribe that he ruled — and gen, an honorific title in the Oto-Manguean languages.

== Biography ==
=== Early life ===
Diriangén was born in 1497. His mother encouraged him to learn swordsmanship and war tactics throughout his childhood.

== Spanish contact ==
At the time of Spanish arrival, Gil González Dávila traveled to western Nicaragua with a small army of just over 100 men made up of conquistadors and their Tlaxcalteca allies. They explored the fertile western valleys and were impressed with the Nahua and Otomanguean civilizations for the vast amounts of food they had in addition to their flourishing markets, permanent temples, and trade network. Before meeting Diriangén, Dávila met with Macuilmiquiztli who was the most powerful ruler in pre-Columbian Nicaragua, and had welcomed the Spaniards and their Tlaxcalteca allies. Diriangén had been alerted of this contact as the Chorotegas had been in continuous wars with the Nahua chiefdoms of Kwawkapolkan and Kakawatan. In addition, Diriangén was cautious about the conquistadors and was skeptical about their intentions, which was the opposite reaction of his enemy Macuilmiquiztli.

== Rebellion ==
Dávila and his army however, used the opportunity to gather gold and baptize some of the Nahuas to Catholicism along the way, much to the disapproval of Macuilmiquiztli. In response to this, Diriangén arrived with an entourage of five trumpeters, five flutists, five hundred men bringing ducks, and sixteen women with golden hatchets and plates. When the Spanish demanded Diriangén and the now skeptical chiefs Macuilmiquiztli, Wemak, and the King of Nicoya to be baptized, to renounce their pagan beliefs, and to hand over the rest of their gold and jewellery, Diriangén refused and promised to return in three days. In three days time, he returned with four thousand Dirian and Nagrandano soldiers and together with the now rebellious military forces of Kwawkapolkan and Kakawatan, forced Dávila and his men to retreat to Panama. This set the stage for what would become the Spanish conquest of Nicaragua in 1524 CE.

== Nahua-Chorotega alliance ==
Despite the enmity between the Chorotegas and Nahuas, Diriangén and Macuilmiquiztli made peace and agreed to team up against the Spanish and Tlaxcaltecas. This formed a triumvirate-style alliance between chiefs Diriangén, Macuilmiquiztli, and Wemak, all of whom fought together against the invaders with the military forces of their chiefdoms. The Indigenous alliance lost the war however, when Nicaragua was invaded on all sides by several Spanish forces, each led by a conquistador. González Dávila was authorized by royal decree to invade from the Caribbean coast of Honduras. Francisco Hernández de Córdoba at the command of the governor of Panama invaded from Costa Rica. Pedro de Alvarado at the command of Hernán Cortés, came from Guatemala through San Salvador and Honduras. Francisco Hernández de Córdoba fought directly against the alliance, and by 1525 the alliance had completely collapsed. Diriangén escaped the Spanish onslaught and died between 1527-1529, Wemak was captured and executed in 1525 after the last of his Kakawatec forces were annihilated by the conquistadors and Tlaxcaltecas, and the fall of Kwawkapolkan in 1525 finalized their defeat.

== Legacy and Martyrdom ==
Diriangén remains a popular figure in Nicaraguan nationalism and anti-colonialism. In addition, Diriangén as well as Macuilmiquiztli are credited with leading the resistance against the Spanish and Tlaxcaltecas, and are symbols of Indigenous resistance against imperialism. Furthermore, their alliance highlights a powerful lesson in teamwork between enemies who set aside their differences and came together to oppose a much greater threat.

== See also ==
- Spanish conquest of Nicaragua
