= Nicarao =

Nicarao may refer to:

- Nicarao people
- Nicarao (cacique)
- Nahuat language or Pipil language
