= Francisco Hernández de Córdoba =

Francisco Hernández de Córdoba may refer to:

- Francisco Hernández de Córdoba (Yucatán conquistador) (died 1517)
- Francisco Hernández de Córdoba (founder of Nicaragua) (died 1526)
