= Cuyamel Caves =

History
- Built: 400-900 AD
- Abandoned: 900-1200 AD

Site notes
- Material: Ceramics
- Archaeologists: Paul Healy

The Cuyamel Caves are a group of archaeological sites that consist of a series of limestone caves in northeast Honduras in the hills above the village of Cuyamel. The sites are located near the Cuyamel River, which drains into the much larger Aguán River.

The importance of these sites stems from their distinct ceramics, which differ from others in the region and show stylistic resemblances to those of far more northern Mesoamerican cultures, including the Olmecs. The connection of Olmec culture to northeastern Honduras has broad implications: that this region of Honduras was occupied in the Early Formative period, that the trade networks of northern cultures extended as far south as Honduras, that the flourishing of civilizations in Mesoamerica could have had an effect on the emergence of social complexity in this region, and that the occupants had an industry that actively produced items for trade with northern cultures.

== Archaeological exploration ==
The caves were explored by archaeologist Paul Healy of the Peabody Museum at Harvard University. They included three limestone caverns: Matilde's Cave, Cuyamel Cave, and Portillo Cave. Healy entered the caves through a gap in the limestone that exposed a 15–30 m from the entrance to the cavern floors. He noted a main passage littered with recesses and alcoves located laterally from the main chamber. It was inside these recesses and side chambers that most of the ceramics and human remains were found. No excavations were undertaken as the ceramics and human remains were found superficially in situ inside these auxiliary chambers. The majority of ceramics and remains were found within the Cuyamel and Portillo caves.

== Findings ==
Healy remarks that the vessels found in the caves are “distinctively Early and Middle Preclassic (Formative)”. A series of techniques were applied in these vessels, ranging from monochrome to bichrome to polychrome, from simple straight spout vessels to human and zoomorphic effigy vessels, etc. One remarkable vessel that originated in this area was a “black polished and excised cylinder vase” identical to Olmec vessels. Healy noted that similar black wares were characteristic of the Mesoamerican Formative period. He remarked on the “incised motif, a stylized jaguar face with tufted eyebrows, full frontal mouth, [that] appears clearly Olmec-inspired, if not actually Olmec manufactured”.
