= Pech people =

Pech
Paya
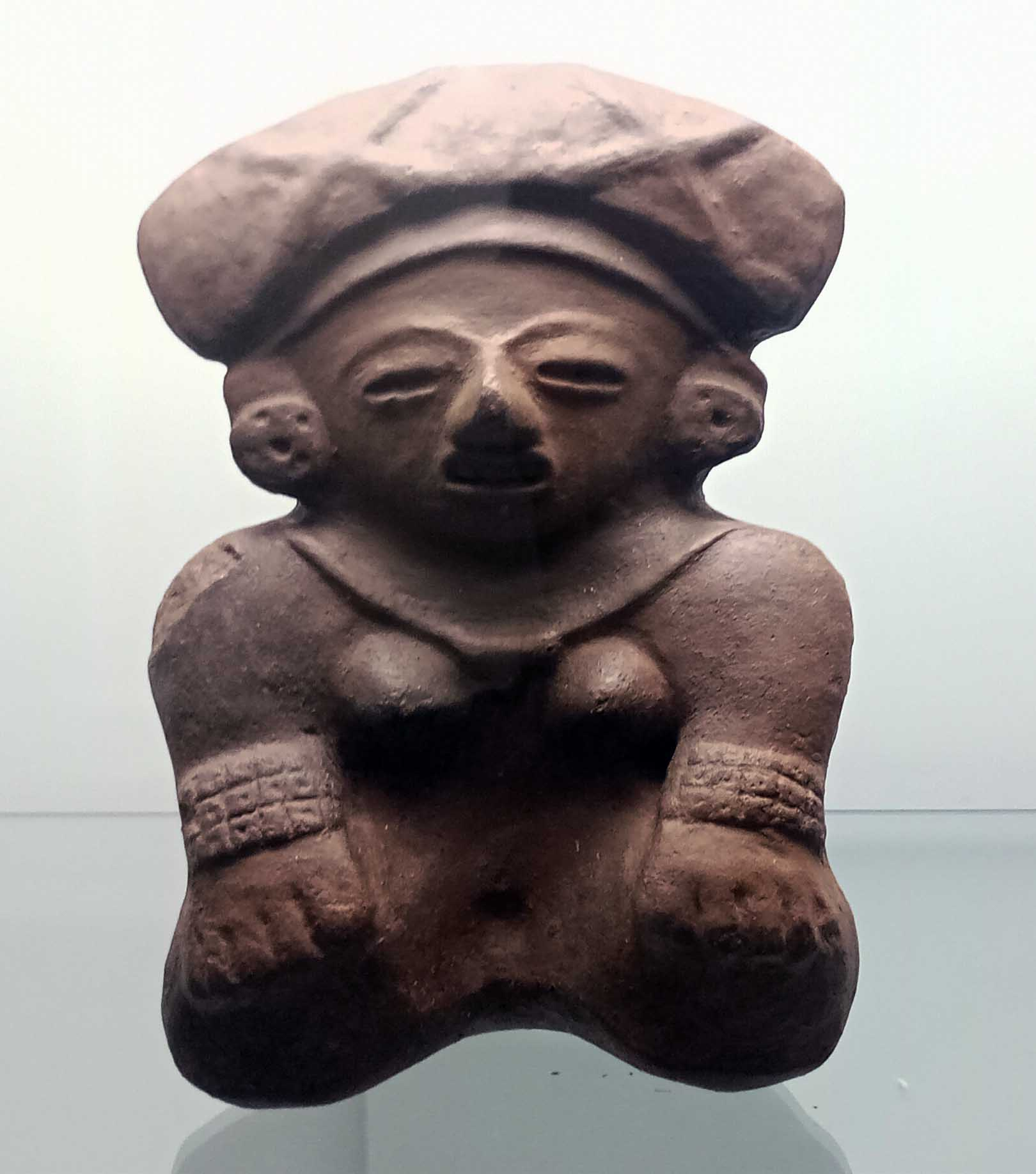

Total population
- 7,000

Regions with significant populations
- Honduras

Languages
- Pech, Spanish, English

Related ethnic groups
- Miskito, Tolupan, Maya peoples, Lenca and Other Afro-Hondurans

The Pech people, previously known as the Paya, are an Indigenous ethnic group in north-eastern Honduras. According to a 2007 census conducted by Indigenous organisations, 6,024 people self-identified as being of Pech descent. This Indigenous group primarily speak in their native tongue, the Pech language, which is a member of the Chibchan languages. Although, in recent developments, the language is mainly spoken by older generations and is in danger of being extinct in the relative near future.

The Pech people reside in the north-eastern territories of Honduras, particularly in the areas of Colón, Gracias a Dios and Olancho. Since their migration to these areas, believed to have migrated from the southern areas of modern-day Colombia, the Pech people have undergone reduction to their land ownership and rights. The regions where the Pech people live were originally densely forested, however, has recently undergone deforestation. Many of the Pech's agricultural practices had to undergo reform, although, some traditional practices are still in place today. The Pech leaders continue to struggle to preserve their culture and language, putting the Pech people in danger of becoming extinct.

== Name ==
The name "Pech" derives from the Pech-language ethnonym Pech, the name that refers only to themselves. For the Pech to refer to other groups, the term "Pech-Hakua" will be used, meaning "other people".

== History ==
=== Pre-colonial period ===
Social complexity began among the Pech or probable Pech speakers as long ago as 300 CE. The earlier Pech cultures may have been developed independently of the Maya, their near neighbours, or they may have been influenced by the Maya, a hypothesis that has been corroborated to some extent by the discovery of Mayan loan-words in the Pech language.

Before the colonial period in the sixteenth century, the Pech people migrated from the south to inhabit a large territory close to the border of Nicaragua. The Pech Indians occupied a large portion of north-eastern Honduran land, which anthropologists define as "lower Central America." According to anthropologists, this lower sector of Central America was considered to be a part of the "lesser-developed intermediate area of Honduras." This land that the Pech people occupied was greatly reduced following conflicts with neighbouring community, the Miskito.

=== 16th to 20th century ===
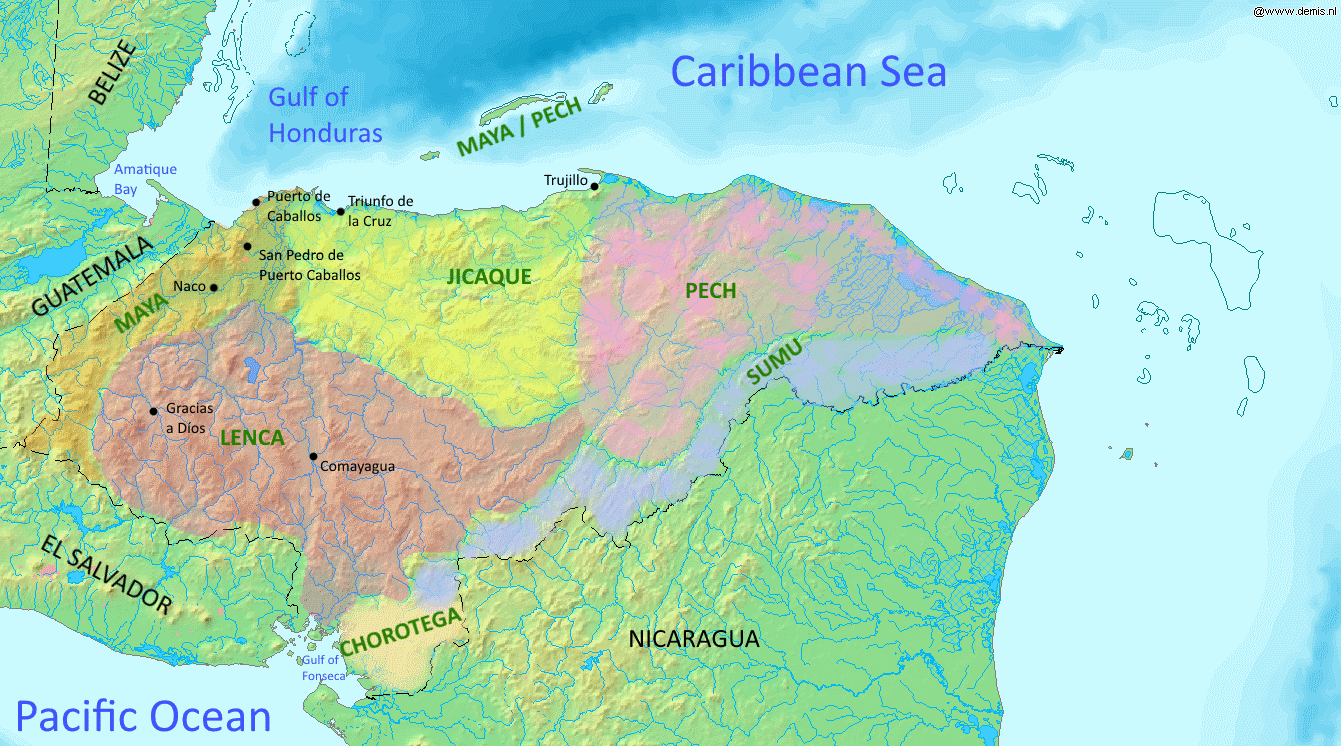
Settlements and groups in 16th-century Honduras

In archaeological reckoning, the Pech formed a number of chiefdoms, some of which left archaeological remains of some sophistication, and certainly by the time of the Spanish exploration of the region in the early 16th century, the coastal regions were dominated by substantial chiefdoms. Spanish records of the mid-16th and early 17th centuries refer to a country called Taguzgalpa, which dominated the region. Spanish attempts to conquer it in the 16th century were unsuccessful.

The Pech people's ownership of land and culture all changed after the Spanish colonisation of Honduras. Between 1622 and 1623, Cristóbal Martínex, Benito de San Francisco and Juan de Beena, founded the Paya reductions in the areas of Concepción de Xuara, Azocegua, Taxamba, Barbatabacha, Zuy and Barcaquer. Following, in 1713, the son of Bartolomé de Escoto, a Spanish coloniser, was titled as the "governor and conqueror of the Paya" and was earning a salary of "one hundred pesos." When the Spanish colonisers landed on Honduras, one hundred percent of the occupied territory of eastern Honduras was under the control of the native and Indigenous American population. After contact and spread of Spanish presence, the Pech people were forced to retreat and live under control of the Spanish colonists, like many other Indigenous groups. Upon arrival, the Spanish colonists recognised the Pech people as 'Xicaque' which remains to still be in use today. At the beginning of 1805, the Pech people were displaced from Cabo Camarón to their current location, along the mouth of the Aguán River. During this period, the Pech people suffered large reductions to their territory. The Pech reduction took place in the territories of Buenaventura in the Olancho Valley in 1739, Siguatepeque in 1767, Río Tinto in 1797 and Franciscans, which accelerated the influence of Spanish culture and the loss of traditional Pech culture. Between 1859 and 1860, Manuel Subirana, a Spanish Jesuit, baptised 600 individuals of the Pech population. Although the Pech's response to the Spanish settlement was much more peaceful than the response from neighbouring Indigenous groups, such as the Jicaque or Tolupan. On the land the Pech inhabited, the presence of gold and sarsaparilla plants attracted foreigners and other Honduran populations to claim the land. Foreigners enslaved the Pech to extract the natural resources from their own lands, resulting in the land being stripped of its resources of gold, timber and plants.

=== Present ===
Today, there are less than a dozen Pech communities that remain in Honduras. The population of Pech people in 1933 was 2586, of whom only 994 claimed the Pech language as their first language. Pech people face the danger of their native tongue becoming extinct in the distant future. While young Pech people can understand Pech on the whole, they mainly speak Spanish. There are some efforts in the community by Pech leaders to revitalise the native language, however, there has reportedly been inadequate support from the government. In 2004, the National Bilingual Programme was introduced, which aimed to improve the English language skills of Indigenous populations, which also contributes to the struggle to revitalise the native Pech language. Other problems that the Pech face today include the increasing Hispanicisation of Pech children, the reduction of cultivable land and woodcutting by private enterprises. Also in 2004, Pech land rights activist and community leader, Elipidio Martinez Chavarria was killed in Dulce Nombre de Culmi, Olancho, as part of the violence connected to land-grabbing.

== Culture ==
According to historians, Martynas Snarskis and Mary W. Helms, pre-European settlement, the Pech people did not possess "key cultural attributes as highly stratified societies, political organisation at the state level, intensive agricultural cultivation techniques, metallurgy, or large urban centres."

=== Agriculture/economy ===
The Pech people have always made a living by fishing and shifting agriculture. This is due to the lack of plant-supplied protein and nutrients in the diets of root croppers. The Pech people acquired the balance of their diet from the practice of hunting and fishing. In order to hunt, the Pech people utilise the 'cerbatana' (a type of blowgun), bow and arrow, and traps. These techniques are still used today in Pech communities. Formerly the Pech hunted quadrupeds such as deer, which are rare today. The Pech hunt an array of birds such as paca, pheasant, armadillo, cashew bird and agouti. When fishing, the Pech people utilise a harpoon and use ground soap plants to poison the water. For the Pech, fishing also consists of gathering crustaceans and mollusks, including shrimp, crabs and jute, a freshwater snail. The main characteristics of Pech agriculture is the clearing of trees. A 'slash and burn' method, where stone axe and fire are used to clear a field of trees and undergrowth of roots, is implemented to dig sticks to plant. Today the main economic activities conducted by the Pech people include tree clearing, gold panning, breeding domestic animals and extracting fragrant resin from liquidambar for perfumes, incense and adhesives. The Pech people also earn profit from selling handcrafted items, including woven baskets, bags, placements and corn-grinding stones.

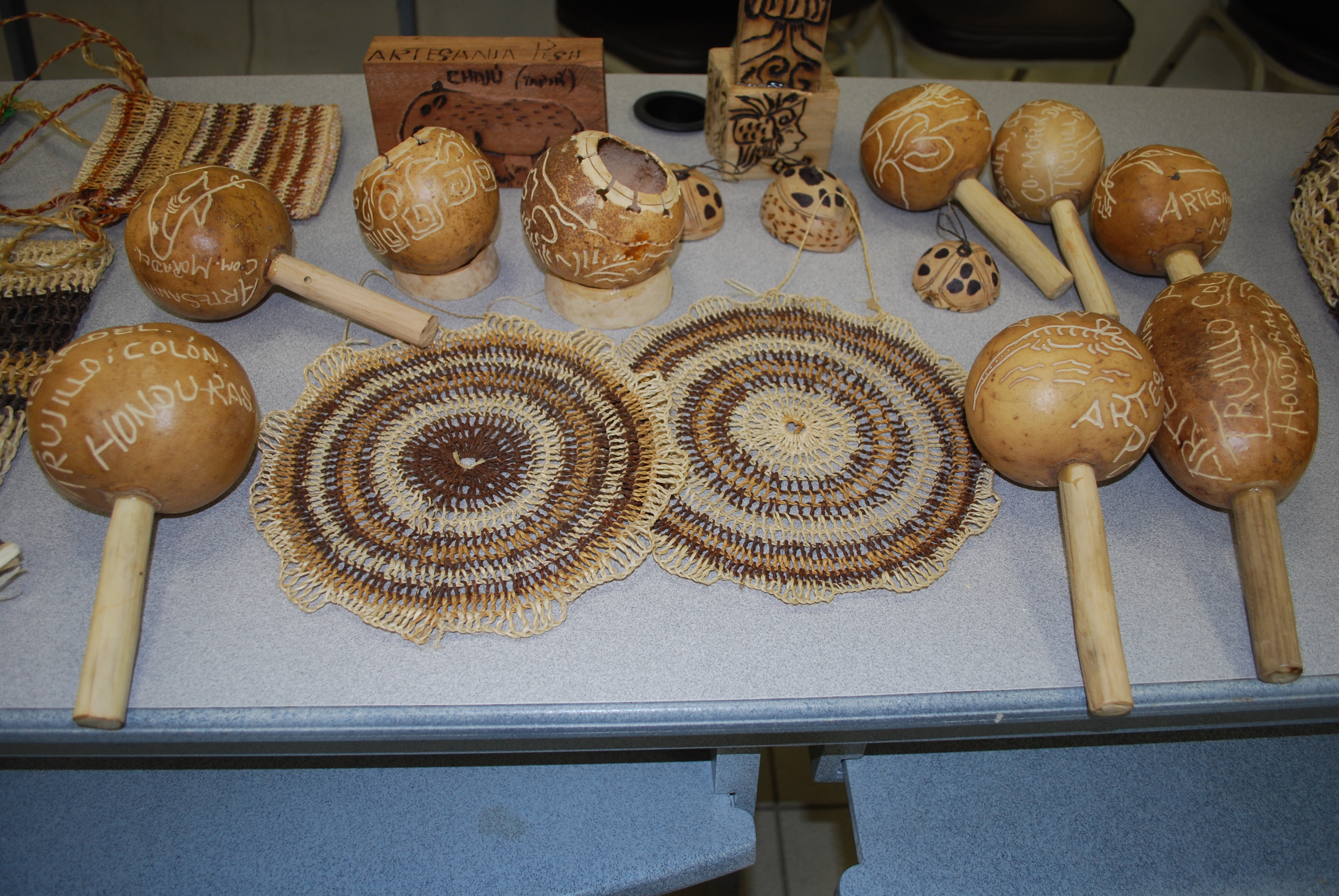
Pech Ceramic Work

=== Ceramics ===
In 2003, a collection of ceramic bowls, plates and jars were discovered in a closet at the University of South Florida. This collection of ceramic pieces were later uncovered to be the craftsmanship of Honduran Indigenous peoples, the Pech. Subsequently, Walter Lehmann as well as archaeologists Doris Stone and Jeremiah Epstein suggested that "the ceramic artefacts found at Islas de la Bahía were similar to those found in Pech territory on the mainland." A British archeologist has made an immense collection of Pech pottery and ceramics on the island of Utila off the coast of Northern Honduras, indicating heavy Pech settlement and a large population on Utila. The ceramics are adorned with animal head sculptures. They can be seen in the Utila museum.

=== Language ===
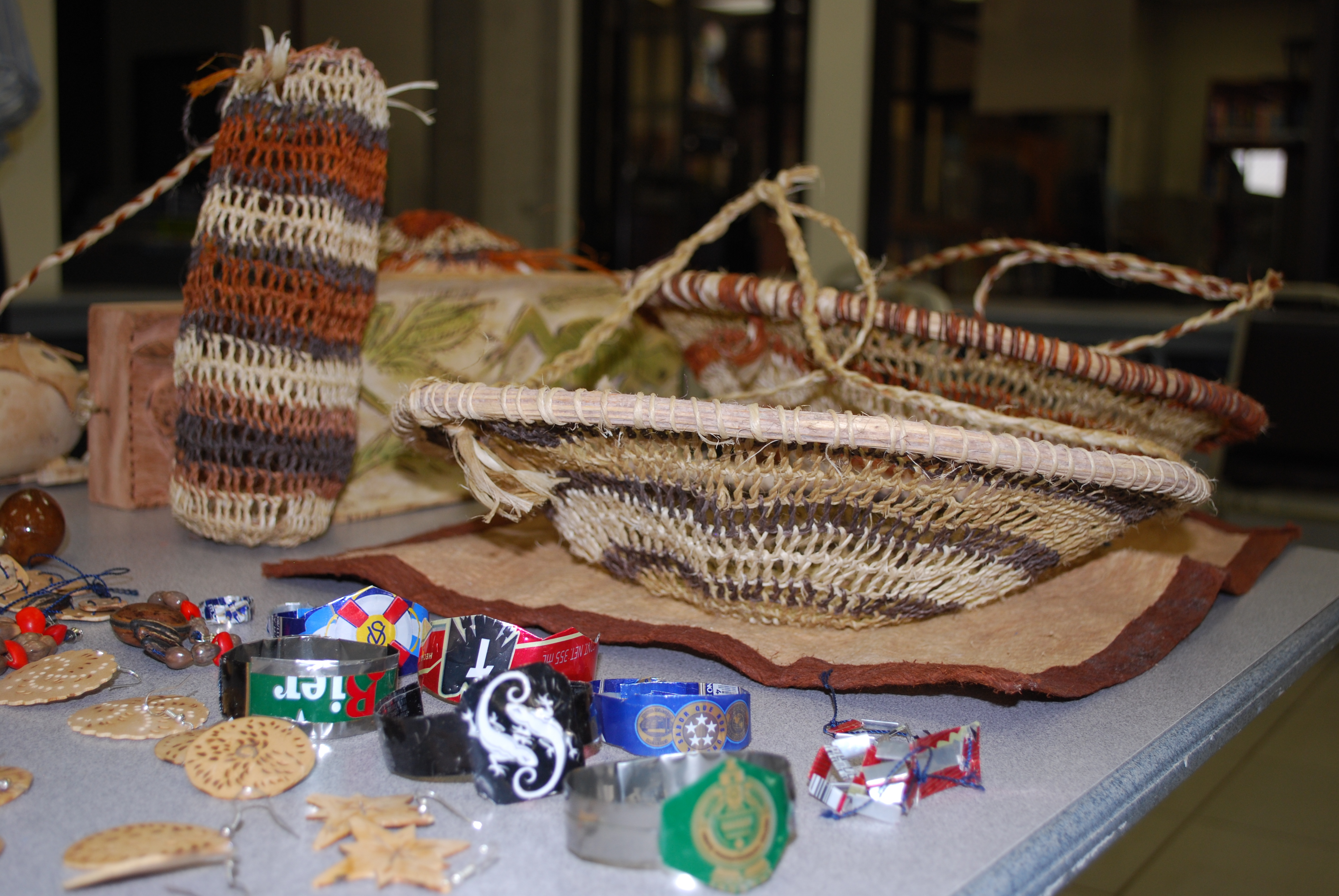
Assorted Pech craft

One of the main characteristics of the Pech people is that they speak in the native tongue of their own language. Their language belongs to the family of Macro-Chibchan languages. Some Pech people also speak Miskito, the language belonging to the neighbouring Miskito Indigenous people. The word "taia", meaning "mine", offers the earliest indication of Paya occupation on the Honduran mainland. This is because "taia" represents a Pech place name for the lands they previously occupied in contrast to the lands that were occupied by other, non-Pech people, which is referred to as "maia". The Pech people consider to own land once they are able to live on land outside the realm of others.

=== Cosmogony ===
Cosmogony is a centrepiece in the Pech belief system as it presents the way they believe the universe is structured and created. Much of Pech cosmogony is based on dualities. For instance, the father God, named Patako-ko, is divided into two separate parts, one celestial and the other terrestrial and is in a constant struggle to vanish the celestial part. For the Pech people, the universe takes on the form of a sphere and has four beams supporting its structure. Within this universe, the subterranean world is inhabited by ferocious animals and ants, the earth is the level where humans live and the sky is divided into seven levels where abysses, lakes and the eternal fire of the sun exist.

=== Religion ===
Most Pech people today identify as Catholic and have only retained a small amount of myths and oral stories from their traditional religions. Pech traditional religion included ceremonies to the spirit of the mountains, the spiritual owners of animals, and to the mermaid who cares for the fish.

== Geography ==
It is believed that the Pech people migrated in a northward direction from the area currently known as Colombia at some point in the past. The earliest indication of Pech life and presence dates back to Christoper Columbus' trip where he reached the Bay Islands and the mainland of Honduras on July 30, 1502. The earliest Pech presence can also be found in the writing of Martyr. Originally, the Pech people inhabited from interior departments of eastern Honduras to the south of present day Trujillo. Although during the colonial period, the Pech people were relocated to mining areas of mainland Honduras. Usually, rivers act as the indicator for the borders of Pech territory, such as the Aguán River, which borders with the Jicaque people, and the Cuyamel River, territory of Cabo de Gracias a Dios. Pech people tend to live in mountainous areas full on forestation.

== Conflict with Miskito people ==
Territorial conflict over the control of the land and its resources was competed against neighbouring Indigenous Honduras groups. Growing land displacements, dispositions and a lack of territorial formalisation is a prominent daily challenge of Indigenous peoples in Honduras. For the Pech people, this challenge stems from a history of conflict with neighbouring Indigenous group, the Miskito People. The aggressive raids of the Miskito were in large manner responsible for the gradual withdrawal of the Pech into the mountainous regions and away from the coast. Beginning from the middle of the 17th century, it has been documented that the Miskito dominated the coastal Pech people and were forced to take rescue along the Patuca, Sicre, Platano, Twas, Paulaya and Sico rivers as well as in the Olancho valley.

The Pech suffered heavily from the emergence of the Miskito in the 17th century and their alliance with outsiders, especially British traders, and with the runaway slaves who made up the "Mosquitos zambos".

== Legal protection ==
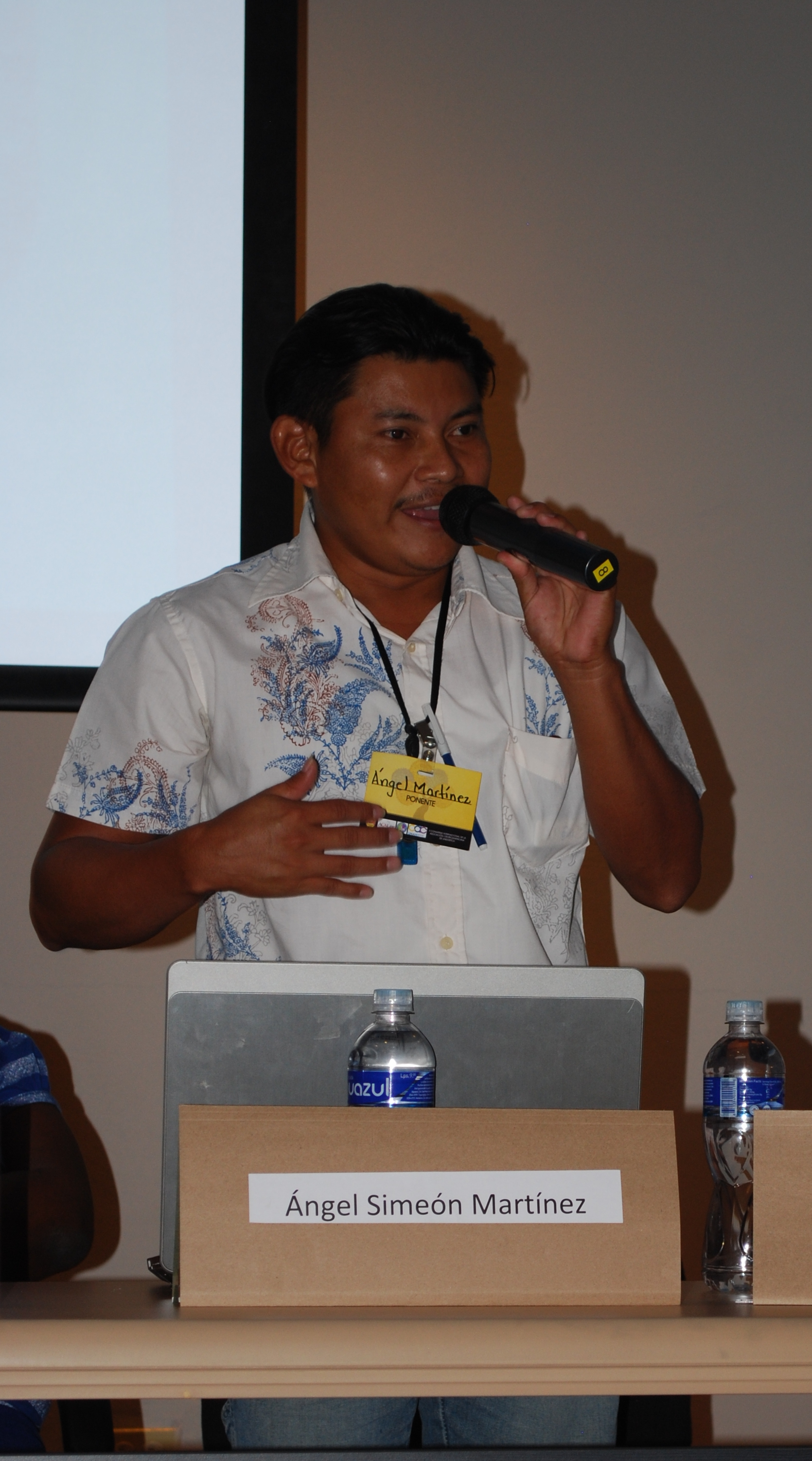
Angel Simeon Martinez representing the Pech people at a forum of the ACALing conference at the Universidad Nacional Autónoma de Honduras

The Pech people are considered to be one of the nine ethnic groups recognised by the Honduran state, the others including Tawkahka, Tolupan, Lenca, Maya chorti, Graifuna, Isleños de Habla Inglesa and Nahua. According to the 2001 government census, the population of the Pech is listed as 4, 138. These groups were the only Indigenous groups named by the census, allowing the Pech people to be recognised both by legal and non-legal bodies.

The Federation of Pech Tribes of Honduras unites 12 Pech tribes and aims to protect their ancestral lands. Previously, the Federation fought the creation of a 'people-free' national park, which aimed to cut communities off from their traditional livelihoods and stop the using of land to harvest liquidambar, a sweet gum used in fragrances. In efforts to fight these 'people-free' national parks, the Honduran government, instead signed a co-management agreement with the Pech people. This agreement legally allows the Pech people to co-manage 34, 000 hectares of the Anthropological and Forest Reserve, Montana del Carbon. The Federation has also established a liquidambar cooperative, which shares the profit between community members and funding for education and public health systems. The Federation also gave the Pech community international attention when it won the Equator Prize, an award organised by the United Nations Development Programme's Equator Initiative.

The Pech people are also protected under the Honduran Institute of Anthropology and History (IHAH). The IHAH is a government agency that was founded in 1952. According to the IHAH, this agency is "dedicated to conserving, protecting, and in some sense, officially defining the country's national culture." The IHAH maintains arachnological sites where ethnographic and historical research takes place for the elaborations of Honduras. In conjunction with the Honduran government's push for tourism, the IHAH, produces a vision of Honduran national identity that is functional to the needs of the international tourism industry. Previous studies on tourism in the Honduran north-eastern coast, have discovered that tourism investment, including actions of the Honduran government and United Nations program, have resulted in community division, environmental damage and dispossession of land with profits remaining in the hands of elite Honduran and international tourist investors.

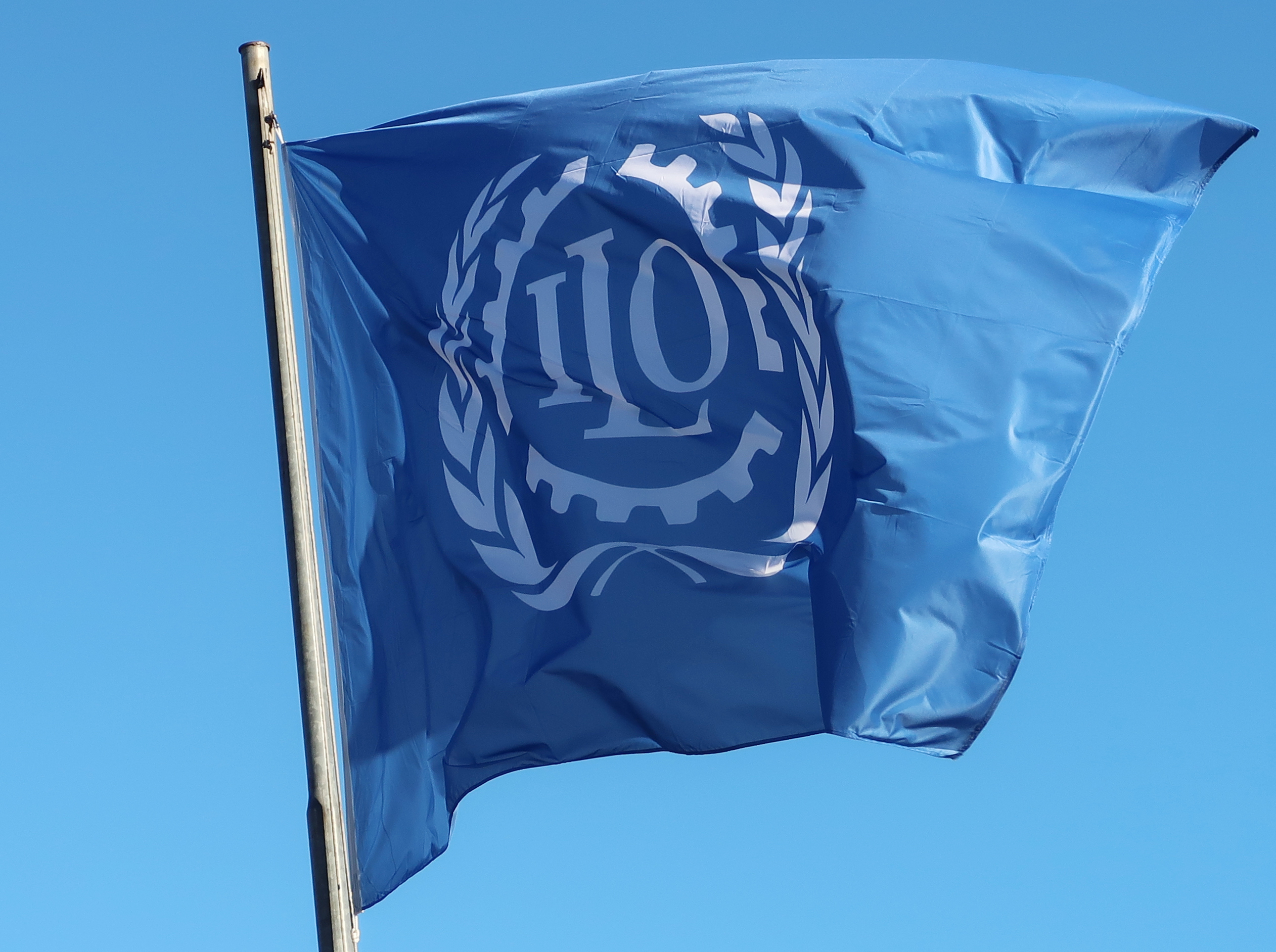
International Labour Organization (ILO) Flag

The Pech people are among the Indigenous groups recognised under the International Labour Organization (ILO), the Indigenous and Tribal Peoples Convention of 1989 (No. 169), which was ratified by the Honduran government in 1995. In particular, the Honduran government has pledged to protect the territorial rights for the state's Indigenous and Afro-descendant communities.

The Pech people have become increasingly integrated economically and politically into Honduran law and society as the economic activity and settlement has advanced into the Pech region. In the 19th century, Spanish missionary, Father Manuel del Jesus Subirana, recognised the significant relationship between the Pech and the land and helped the Pech people acquire title to land ownership in 1862. Furthermore, some Pech communities situated in the Olancho valley, joined the Unión de Campesinos (UNC) in an effort to reclaim their land territory.

== Current issues ==
During the dictatorship of General Tiburcio Carias Andino between 1933 and 1948, the process of 'Mayanisaton', as coined by Euraque, constructed a national identity that ignored the lived realities of Indigenous groups of Honduras. Investments from Central American Banks, Harvard, Pennsylvania State and Tulane contributed to this process by funding restoration projects, including the restoration of archaeological sites in Copan. Later, in the 1970s, this was projected as a priority by the Ministry of Tourism. The Pech people continue to fight the impacts of this and tourism today.

== Bibliography ==
- Ambassador Oscar Acosta, “History of Honduras.” One World Nations Online. Last modified February 1, 2001. https://www.nationsonline.org/oneworld/History/Honduras_history.htm
- Anderson, Mark. 2007. "When Afro Becomes (Like) Indigenous: Garifuna and Afro-Indigenous Politics in Honduras." The Journal of Latin American and Caribbean Anthropology 12, no. 2 (2007): 384-413.
- Bawaya, Michael. “Land of Make-Believe.” New Scientist 221, no. 2950 (2014): 34-37.
- Euraque, Darío A. “The Honduran Coup and Cultural Policy.” NACLA Report on the Americas 43, no. 2 (2010): 30-36.
- Griffin, Wendy; Escobar, Hernán Martinez; Torres, Juana Carolina Hernández. Los pech de Honduras: una etnia que vive. Tegucigalpa, D.C. Honduras: Instituto Hondureño de Antropologiae Historia, 7.
- Herranz, Atanasio, and Sessions, Scott. “Pech.” In The Oxford Encyclopedia of Mesoamerican Cultures, edited by Davd Carrasco. Oxford: Oxford University Press, 2001. https://www-oxfordreference-com.ezproxy2.library.usyd.edu.au/view/10.1093/acref/9780195108156.001.0001/acref-9780195108156-e-497
- “Honduras: Pech Leader Killed in Honduras.” Cultural Survival. https://www.culturalsurvival.org/news/honduras-pech-leader-killed-honduras
- Macneill, Tim. “Development as Imperialism: Power and the Perpetuation of Poverty in Afro-Indigenous Communities of Coastal Honduras.” Humanity & Society 41, no. 2 ( 2017): 209–239
- Minority Rights Group International. “Honduras”. World Directory of Minorities and Indigenous Peoples. Last modified May, 2018. https://minorityrights.org/minorities/pech/.
- Minority Rights Group International. “Pech”. World Directory of Minorities and Indigenous Peoples. Last modified May 19, 2018. https://minorityrights.org/minorities/pech/.
- Mollett, Sharlene. “‘Displaced Futures’: Indigeneity, Land Struggles and Mothering in Honduras.” Politics, Groups and Identities 3, no. 4 (2015): 678-683.
- Samson, James Richard, "Indigenous Lands in a Developing Region: A Historical Ethnogeography of the Pech Indians of Eastern Honduras, With Emphasis on Recent Settlement and Land Use Changes." (1997). LSU Historical Dissertations and Theses. 6520. https://digitalcommons.lsu.edu/gradschool_disstheses/6520
- Williams, Victoria R. Indigenous Peoples: An Encyclopedia of Culture, History, and Threats to Survival. California: ABC-CLIO, 2020.
