= Andrés Niño =

Spanish navigator

- Born: 1475; Moguer, Spain
- Died: 1530 (aged 54–55); San Miguel Department (El Salvador)

Andrés Niño (born in Moguer in 1475; died about 1530) was a Spanish navigator.

== Biography ==
From early youth he navigated vessels for the Portuguese government to the coast of Africa and the East Indies, and he went in 1515 to Panama, where he acquired the reputation of a skilled pilot. In 1521, Gil González Dávila received a commission from the crown of Spain to explore and conquer the Mar del Sur (South Sea) Pacific coast west, and north, of Panama, he constructed four vessels with timber that was transported with immense labor across the isthmus from the Atlantic. He appointing Niño chief pilot and sailed on 21 January 1522, from Tararegui, in the Bay of San Miguel.

Gonzalez landed on the coast in the Bay of San Vicente (Current Caldera in Costa Rica) with part of his forces to explore the country, and sent Niño further north to discover a passage to the Atlantic of which the Indians had told him. Niño followed the coast to latitude 17º 50' north, and, finding no passage, returned to the south, where he found the Adelantado besieged by an army of 4,000 Indians, whom he helped to disperse. They then continued to explore the coast of Cape Blanco, the Bay of Papagayos, Possession River, and a gulf which they called Fonseca, in honor of the president of the council of the Indies. They landed in the possessions of a cacique called Nicarao, and, after many encounters with the warlike tribes, penetrated to the interior and discovered there a large fresh-water lake, which they called Mar Dulce, or sweet lake (now Lake Nicaragua), and the volcano of Masaya.

The first known visit by Spaniards to what is now Salvadoran territory was made by the admiral Niño, who led an expedition to Central America. He disembarked in the Gulf of Fonseca on 31 May 1522, at Meanguera island, naming it Petronila, and then traversed to Jiquilisco Bay on the mouth of Lempa River.

After exploring Panama thoroughly, Niño and his crew sailed again for Panama, where they arrived, 29 December 1522, laden with treasure. They gave a glowing description of the country, which for its wealth they called the paradise of Mohammed. Gonzalez sailed in the following year to Spain to solicit the commission of governor of the country and fit out a new expedition, and Niño returned with him to enjoy his riches, but, his health being shattered by the fatigues of his frequent voyages, he did not survive many years.
