= Taguzgalpa =

Taguzgalpa was a region on the Caribbean coast of Central America lying between the Roman (Aguán) River and the San Juan River. Of Nahuatl origin, the term was first translated by the Spanish cleric Cristóbal de Pedraza in his 1544 Relación de la Provincia de Honduras e Higueras, based on information gathered during his tenure in Honduras (1538–1540). Pedraza reported that after a three-day ascent into the mountains behind Trujillo—likely the modern Sierra de la Esperanza—local informants explained Tagusgualpa to mean “the house where gold is melted,” referring to a principal settlement in the region where inhabitants from surrounding areas gathered to smelt gold. It appeared on the Dutch map of Montanus in 1671 with an alternate spelling of "Tiguzigalpa."

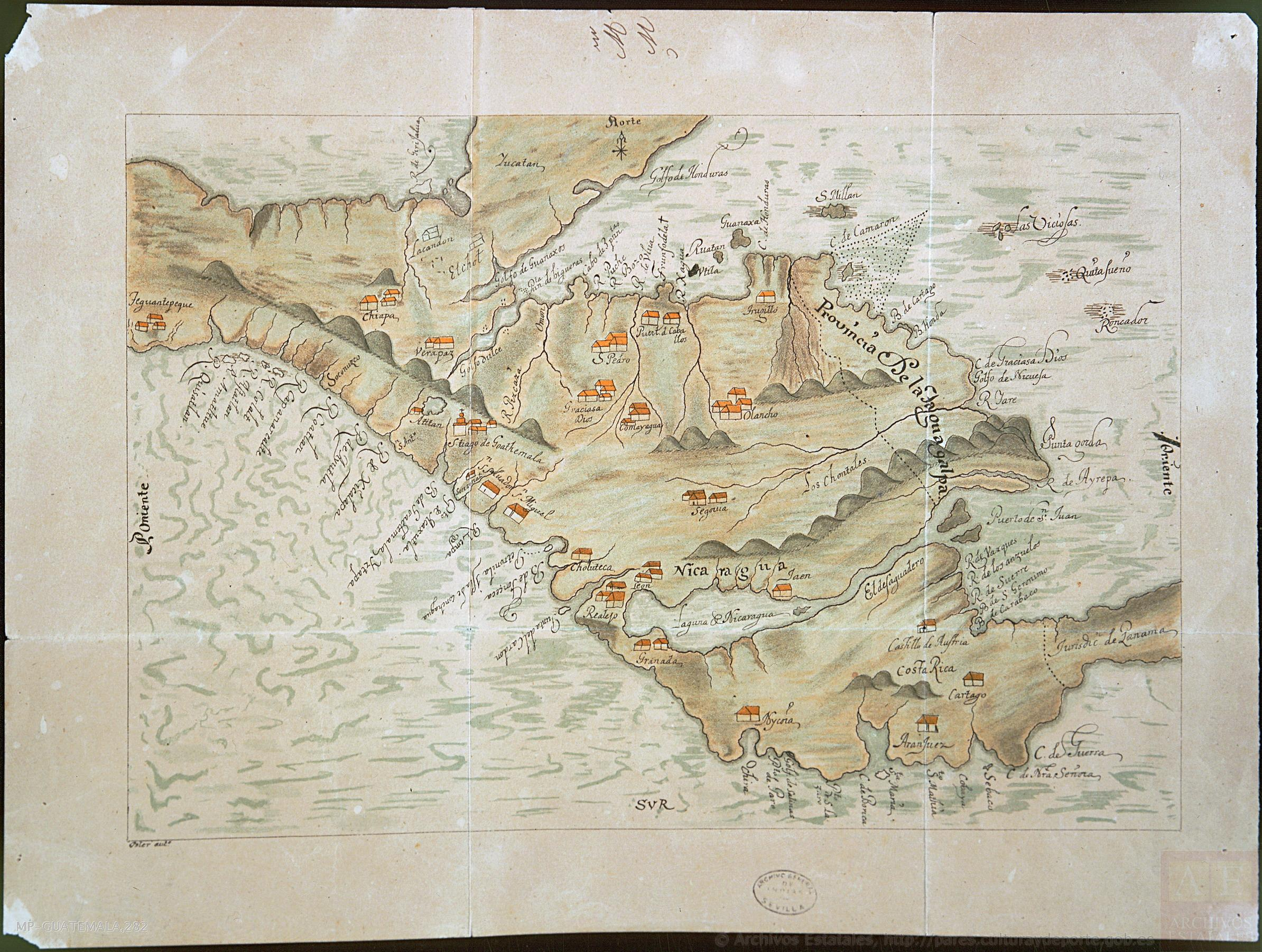
Spanish map of the territory of Taguzgalpa, 1690.

It was frequently confused in nineteenth-century travel literature with Tegucigalpa, the present capital of Honduras, and it is possible that both words share the same root. However, a study of the location information of the two places in the original sixteenth- and seventeenth- century sources shows that they are not in the same place, and are both mentioned, in different areas in the same texts. In his classic study of indigenous names in Honduras, Alberto Membreño wrote, "For a long time it was believed that Tegucigalpa was a corruption of Taguzgalpa and that it meant 'mountain of silver.' Tegucigalpa did not form a part of Taguzgalpa, and when this province was conquered, Tegucigalpa already existed. Don Pedro de Alvarado wrote Teguycegalpa in the repartimiento of 1536." Membreño gives the etymology of Taguzgalpa as "tlalli, 'earth', cuztic, 'yellow', calli, 'house', and pan, 'in'. This province is so called because there is a great deal of gold on its surface and in the sands of its rivers; and it refers to the tradition that the Mexicans went to Taguzgalpa to take that metal to Moctezuma."

== Early history ==
The primary inhabitants of the region were the Pech, formerly known as Paya. Archaeological research, beginning in 1933, located evidence of social complexity in the Early Selin Period (300–600 CE). It was archaeologically connected to the Late Cocol phase at the time the Spanish arrived. At that time and from considerably earlier periods, the region was involved in a fairly extensive inter-regional trade by sea, reaching as far as Yucatán. Early accounts by Columbus, who passed the region during his fourth voyage (not mentioning Taguzgalpa by name) suggest a number of chiefdoms along the coast. The earliest accounts of the region suggest that a more hierarchically organized political structure may not have existed in the early sixteenth century, and that a larger, more hierarchically organized polity emerged in the late sixteenth century, possibly in response to the European threat. In his account of Honduras of 1544, Bishop Cristóbal de Pedraza mentioned that "Tagiusgualpa" was the location of a large and allegedly gold-rich city, in which the inhabitants ate on plates of gold. This became the root of the legend of the "White City" (La Ciudad Blanca), a lost city in the jungle. Subsequent references to the province, however, suggest a semi-nomadic population with a fairly egalitarian social organization, and not a unified polity.

== Relations with the Spanish ==
Taguzgalpa successfully resisted several attempts by the Spanish to conquer it in the sixteenth century. Plans and royal permission to conquer and settle Taguzgalpa were issued in 1545, 1562, 1576, 1577 and 1594, though none was successful. As a result of their failure to conquer the region, and the increasing competition with English traders, privateers and other interlopers in the region, Spain attempted, quite unsuccessfully, to convert the people in an effort to win their loyalty. In 1604 Franciscans began their attempt to "reduce" the area, including resettlement of people into larger missionary-supervised villages. These efforts, reinforced by those of other missionary orders, continued sporadically throughout the seventeenth and eighteenth centuries. While they achieved some success, and at times used armed force, only a relatively small number of people were affected.

The coastal regions of Taguzgalpa were lost to Spanish settlers at Trujillo, and then in the seventeenth century to raiding Miskito from today's Nicaragua.

== See also ==
- Tologalpa
- Mosquito Coast

== Works cited ==
- Cuddy, Thomas W (2007). Political Identity and Archaeology in Northeast Honduras. Boulder, Colorado: The University Press of Colorado. ISBN 978-0-87081-843-1.
- Membreño, Alberto (1901). Nombres geográficos indígenas de la república de Honduras (in Spanish). Honduras: Tipografía Nacional. ISBN 9781145547797.
