= Hernán Ponce de León =

16th-century Spanish conquistador

Hernán Ponce de León was a Spanish conquistador who participated in the discovery of Panama, Costa Rica, and Nicaragua in the early 16th century.
