= Tologalpa =

Tologalpa was part of the Province of Taguzgalpa, mentioned in Spanish records of the sixteenth and seventeenth centuries, as lying on the eastern side of Central America stretching from the San Juan River to the Coco River. Very little is known about this territory, however, as the Spanish had little contact with it, save for some unsuccessful attempts to evangelize it in the seventeenth century. It therefore remained under the control of Kingdom of Mosquitia until 1859.

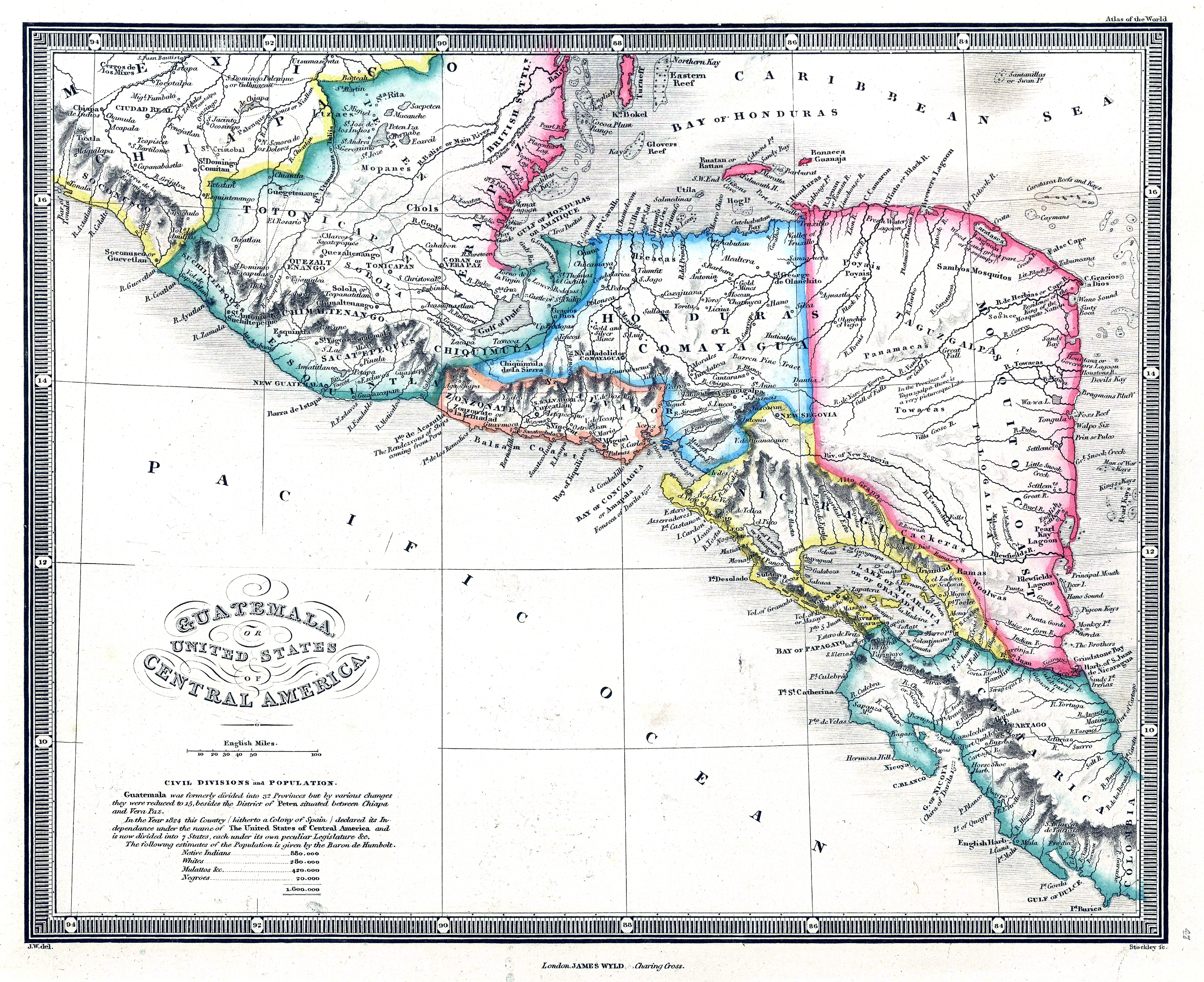
Map of Central America, showing Tologalpa within the Kingdom of Mosquitia.
