= Gil González Dávila =

Spanish conquistador

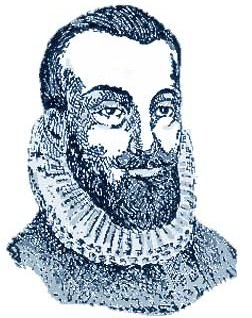
Drawing of Gil Gonzalez Davila

Gil González Dávila or Gil González de Ávila (c. 1480 – 21 April 1526) was a Spanish conquistador and the first European to explore present-day Nicaragua.

== Early career ==
González Dávila first appears in historical records in 1508, when he received a royal commission to examine accounts and tax records of estates. He probably traveled soon afterward to Santo Domingo for his assignment, and to establish himself. In 1511, from Valladolid, Spain, he was given the title of Accountant of Hispaniola or contador.

By 1514, the Hispaniola treasury staff put in place by Ferdinand, included Gil, who had replaced Cristóbal de Cuéllar as contador, Miguel de Pasamonte, who had been named treasurer general of the Indies in April 1508, and Juan Martinez de Ampies as factor.

His enhanced position enabled him to become a teacher and he soon had an estate with over 200 Indian slaves. In 1518, González delivered a report to Charles V which was highly critical of the colonial management of Hispaniola. He was at Ávila in Spain when he was approached by Andrés Niño. Niño was an expert pilot and resident of the Spanish Main. He had come to Spain to seek Court support for an exploration of the Pacific Coast. His first attempts had failed, but then he encountered González, a retainer of the bishop of Palencia. The bishop, Juan Rodriguez de Fonseca, was president of the Council of the Indies. With his help, González and Niño obtained approval for the venture from King Carlos. An expedition was planned, with González as captain, Niño as pilot, and Andrés de Cereceda as treasurer.

== Arrival in and conquest of Costa Rica and Nicaragua ==
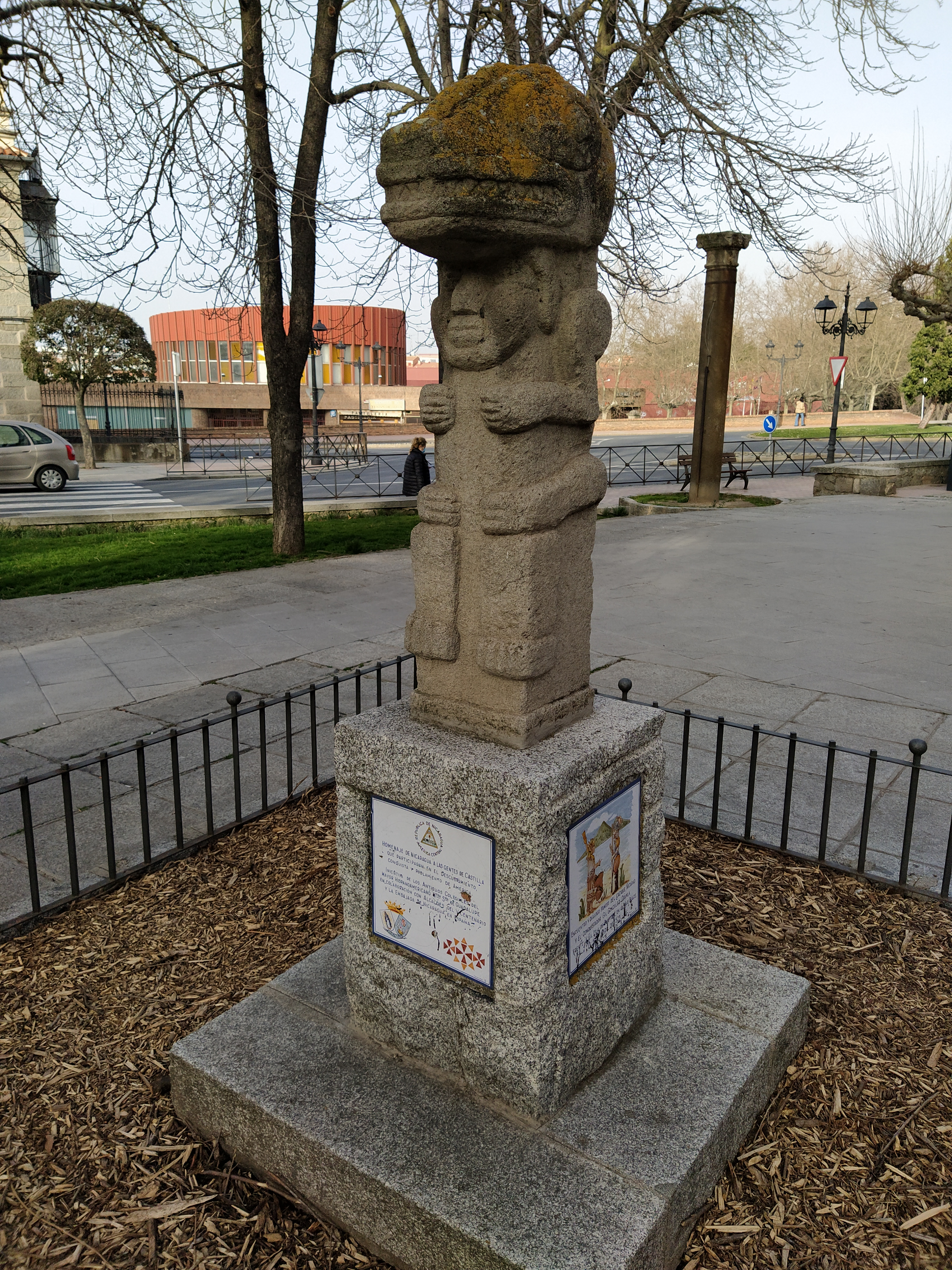
Statue located in Avila in memory of the Conqueror Gil González Dávila.

In June 1519, King Charles gave his consent to the expedition. González and Niño immediately departed for the Indies, and then proceeded to Acla in Panama, arriving in January 1520. González presented his royal commission to the governor of Panama, authorizing him to examine the tax records of the colony of Panama and prepare the expedition for exploration of the Pacific coast of Central America. The governor, known as Pedrarias, resented this scrutiny of his taxing authority and encroachment on territory for which he had his own plans. He blocked investigation of the taxes, and inhibited Gonzalez's efforts to obtain seaworthy ships, supplies, and men for the expedition. Unable to acquire ships, González and Niño began construction of four brigantines on Terarequi in the Pearl Islands, in the gulf of Panama.

On 26 January 1522, the expedition left from Terarequi but was forced to land in western Panama after four days because of leaking ships. González disembarked with the main body of the army, and marched West towards current Costa Rica. Niño, after making repairs, sailed along the coast until he reached a gulf named "de Osa", where the army and fleet were reunited. While González continued by land, Niño sailed by the coast "in sight" of the landed party. Cereceda's records indicate they baptized hundreds of natives and obtained a substantial amount of gold, and pearls. They arrived at a pleasant bay that they named San Vicente (current Caldera) in Costa Rica. They continue North to the territories of Nicoya where they found the largest concentration of Native Americans. From Cereceda's account, the Nicoyans did not put any resistance and more than 6000 people were baptized, and more gold and pearls were obtained. González continued North and would eventually discover and take formal possession of the bay of Corinto, and then the Golfo de Fonseca, which he named in honor of their patron, bishop Juan Rodriguez de Fonseca.

González proceeded to explore the fertile western valleys and was impressed with the Indian civilization he found there. He discovered the lakes later named Nicaragua and Managua. He and his small army gathered gold and baptized Indians along the way. Eventually, they so imposed upon the Indians that they were attacked and threatened with annihilation. Nevertheless, González managed to extricate his force and retreat to the gulf where his ships were anchored. They boarded the ships and headed south.

In June 1523, González returned to Panama with 3 leaky ships, 100 exhausted men, and considerable gold. He told of his "discovery" of "Nicaragua" and its people, cities, and wealth. He named the territory after an Indian king "Nic-atl-nauac", which was rendered in Spanish as "Nicarao".

== Conquest of Honduras ==
Governor Pedrarias saw an opportunity for himself in Nicaragua, and moved to gain control of the situation. He attempted to arrest González and confiscate his treasure. However, González managed to avoid capture and escaped to his base in Santo Domingo. There, he used the fortune he had acquired to outfit another expedition for a return to Nicaragua.

By early 1524, González sailed again for Nicaragua, but a storm brought him to a bay on the Caribbean coast of Honduras where he had to lighten the ship by throwing a number of horses overboard, hence the name Puerto Caballos (now Puerto Cortés). He then sailed further west, to the Bay of Amatique and the Río Dulce, where he founded the town of San Gil de Buenavista. After leaving settlers behind he reboarded his ships and sailed eastward along the coast of Honduras, to just east of the Cabo de Honduras where he landed and intended to push into Nicaragua. In the meantime, the settlers at San Gil de Buenavista moved closer to the Indian town of Amatique because they found the original location too dangerous. They resettled at Nito, near Amatique.

In the summer of 1524, Davila took a strong force and began a march to the south, towards the western valley of Nicaragua, where he had operated before. En route, he met a Spanish platoon near Toreba and learned that "his" territory had been invaded by an army sent by governor Pedrarias from Panama. The army commander was Francisco Hernández de Córdoba.

The platoon was forced to return south with a warning to vacate the area. Córdoba sent a small force under command of Hernando de Soto to deal with González. Soto was caught in a stealthy attack, but managed to defend himself. Then the two called a truce and Soto thought they could come to an agreement, but González tricked him. With reinforcements, he attacked again and captured Soto's force. However, in a gesture of good will, and perhaps fearing the much larger army of Córdoba, he released the prisoners and returned to Puerto Caballos where he learned of the arrival of other Spaniards.

In May 1524, Cristóbal de Olid arrived in Honduras east of Puerto Caballos with an army with orders from Hernán Cortés to establish a colony for him. Olid established the colony near the town today called Triunfo de la Cruz, and then made himself governor in defiance of both Cortés and González. In 1524, Cortés decided it was necessary to send Francisco de las Casas with another force to rectify the situation. Instead, Olid took control and captured both las Casas at Triunfo and González in Naco. Eventually, his own men betrayed Olid, and freed the prisoners. A summary trial was held, Olid was found guilty of treason, and he was beheaded.

Las Casas and González decided to join forces, and both declared their loyalty to Cortés. Both men decided to return to Mexico, and las Casas left Lopez de Aguirre in charge, with instructions to found a town, Trujillo, at the location of Puerto Caballos. However, López de Aguirre found the area around Puerto Caballos unsuitable and moved eastward along the coast, eventually settling near modern Trujillo. Meanwhile, Cortés himself had decided to journey to Honduras to ensure the establishment and security of the colony.

== Epilogue ==
When Las Casas and González arrived in Mexico, they found Salazar de la Pedrada in charge, having been placed there by Cortés. They refused to acknowledge his authority, stating their loyalty to Cortés, or if he had died, to Pedro de Alvarado. Salazar had them arrested and prosecuted for the murder of Olid. He intended to execute them, but was finally forced to send them as prisoners to Spain.

González's fate upon arrival in Spain is unknown. His old patron, bishop de Fonseca, had died in 1524, and his new patron, Hernán Cortés, had his own problems which caused him to return to Spain to recover favor with the King. Gil González Dávila died in his native Ávila on 21 April 1526. The only clue to his vindication and return to Mexico was a son and namesake.

== See also ==
- El Nuevo Diario
- Leon Viejo, Nicaragua
