= Aguán River =

River in Honduras

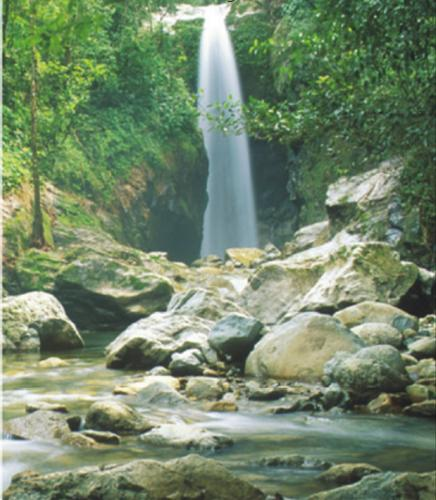

- Location of the mouth

Location
- Country: Honduras

Physical characteristics
- Source
  - location: Yoro
- Mouth
  - location: Caribbean
  - coordinates: 15°52′19″N 85°37′47″W
- Length: 240 km (150 mi)
- Discharge
  - average: 140 m^{3}/s (4,900 cu ft/s)

The Aguán River (Spanish pronunciation: [aˈɣwan]); also commonly known by its Spanish name, Rio Aguán) is a river in Honduras. It rises in the Yoro region to the west of San Lorenzo and briefly runs south before turning east-northeast, passing San Lorenzo, Olanchito and Tocoa before entering the Caribbean Sea east of Puerto Castilla.

The river is 240 kilometres (150 mi) long. In 1998 Hurricane Mitch caused to the river to burst its banks at several points along its length. The maximal discharge at Sabá was estimated at almost 20,000 cubic metres per second (710,000 cu ft/s). The village of Santa Rosa de Aguán was washed away by the river, causing dozens of deaths.

The Aguán River's watershed is one of seven watersheds in Honduras, and covers over 1 million hectares (3,900 mi^{2}), of which around 200,000 are in the Aguán River Valley. The Aguán River Valley includes the major agricultural area of Bajo Aguán.

Spanish and British accounts in the 18th and 19th centuries, including that of Edward Long in 1774, described the river as forming part of the western frontier of Taguzgalpa with Honduras.

== See also ==
- List of rivers of Honduras
