= Francisco Hernández de Córdoba (founder of Nicaragua) =

Founder of Nicaragua

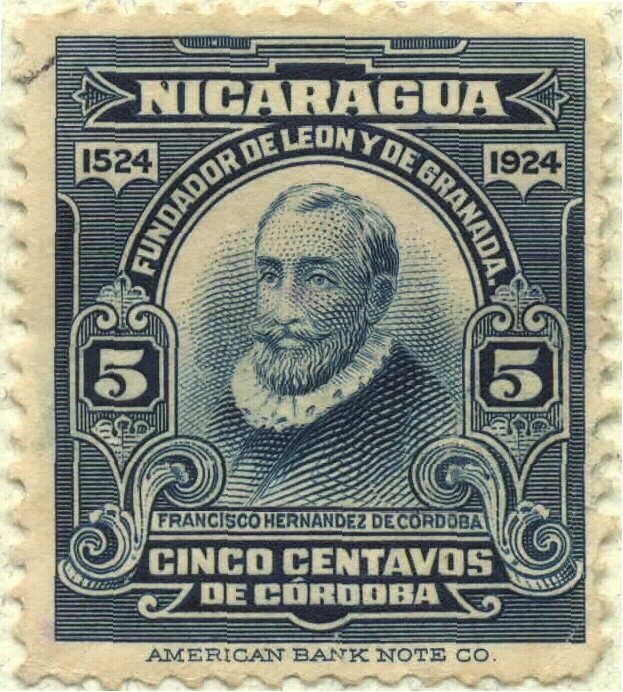
Francisco Hernandez de Córdoba Nicaraguan Postage, 1924

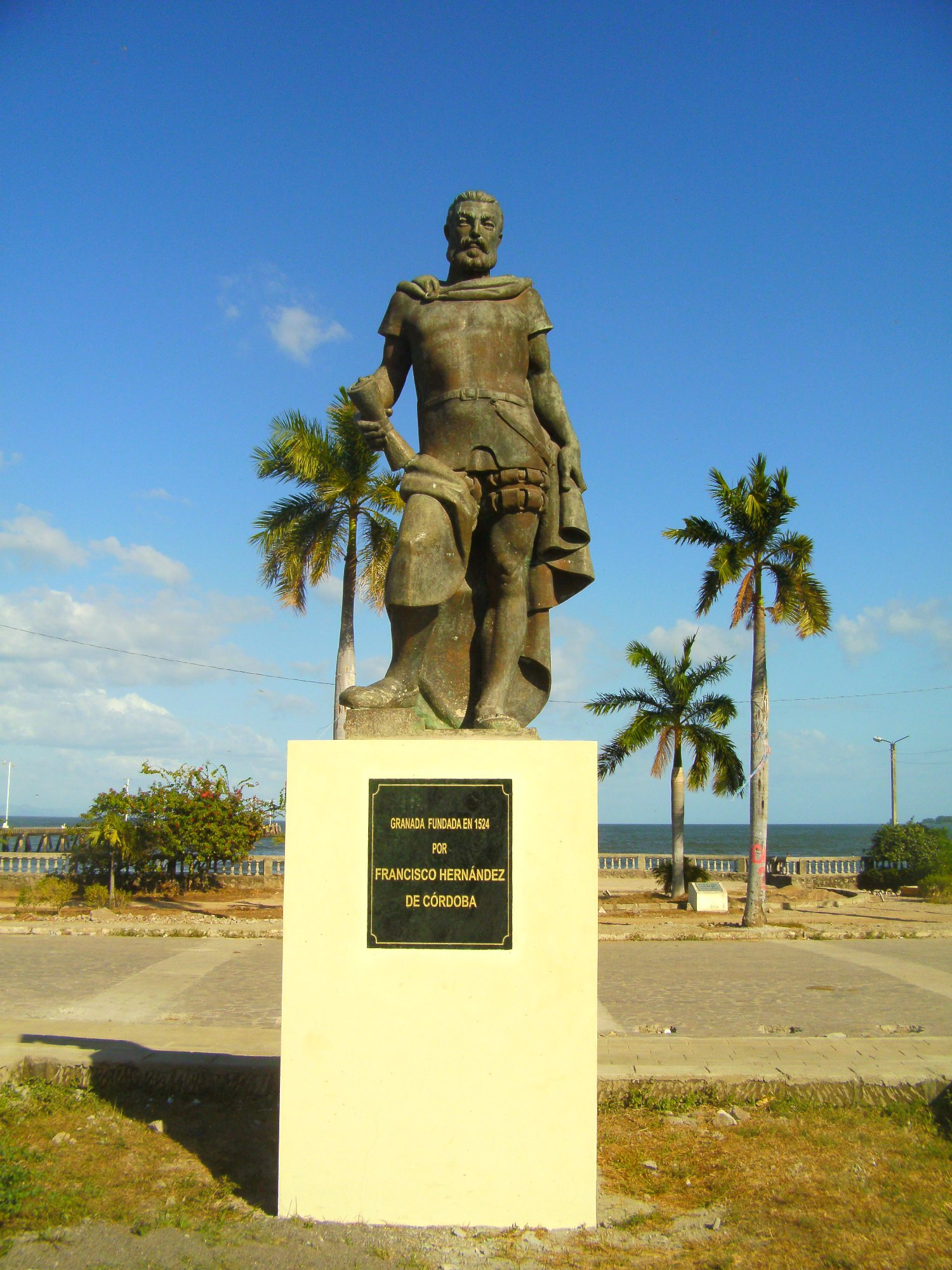
A statue of Francisco Hernández de Córdoba in Granada

Francisco Hernández de Córdoba (Spanish: [fɾanˈθisko eɾˈnandeθ ðe ˈkoɾðoβa]; c. 1475 – 1526) is usually reputed as the founder of Nicaragua, and in fact he founded two important Nicaraguan cities, Granada and León. The currency of Nicaragua is named the córdoba in his memory.

Córdoba was an officer of Pedro Arias Dávila, known also as Pedrarias Dávila. Hernán Cortés and Hernán Ponce de León supported Córdoba during the conquest of Nicaragua in 1524, in return for support against Cristóbal de Olid. Dávila considered Córdoba an insurrectionist and a traitor, and finally captured and beheaded him.

His remains were found in 2000 in León Viejo, Nicaragua.
