= History of Honduras (to 1838) =

History of Honduras until 1838

Honduras has been inhabited by a number of indigenous peoples, the most powerful of which, until the ninth century CE, were the Maya. The western-central part of Honduras was inhabited by the Lenca while other indigenous peoples settled in the northeast and coastal regions. These peoples had their conflicts but maintained commercial relationships with each other and with other populations as distant as Panama and Mexico.

On July 30, 1502, Christopher Columbus first saw Honduran soil and claimed the territory in the name of his sovereigns, Ferdinand II of Aragon and Isabella I of Castile. He named the area "Honduras" (meaning "depths") for the deep water off the coast. In 1523 the first expeditionary forces arrived under the command of Gil Gonzales de Avila, who hoped to rule the new territory. In 1524, Cristobal de Olid arrived with the same intent on behalf of Hernán Cortés. Olid founded the colony Triunfo de la Cruz and tried to establish his own independent government. When Cortes learned of this, he sent a new expedition, headed by Francisco de las Casas. Olid managed to capture his rivals, but was betrayed by his men and assassinated. Cortes himself then traveled to Honduras and established his government in the city of Trujillo before returning to Mexico in 1526. Honduras formed part of the colonial era Captaincy General of Guatemala. The cities of Comayagua and Tegucigalpa developed as early mining centers.

By October 1537, the Lenca leader Lempira had unified more than two hundred indigenous groups to resist penetration by the Spanish conquerors. After a long battle, Governor Montejo gained control of the Valley of Comayagua, established the city of Comayagua in another location, and defeated the indigenous forces in Tenampua, Guaxeregui, and Ojuera.

Honduras gained independence from Spain in 1821. The country was briefly annexed to the First Mexican Empire. In 1823, Honduras joined the newly formed United Provinces of Central America federation, which collapsed in 1838.

== Pre-Columbian era ==
=== Mayan civilization ===
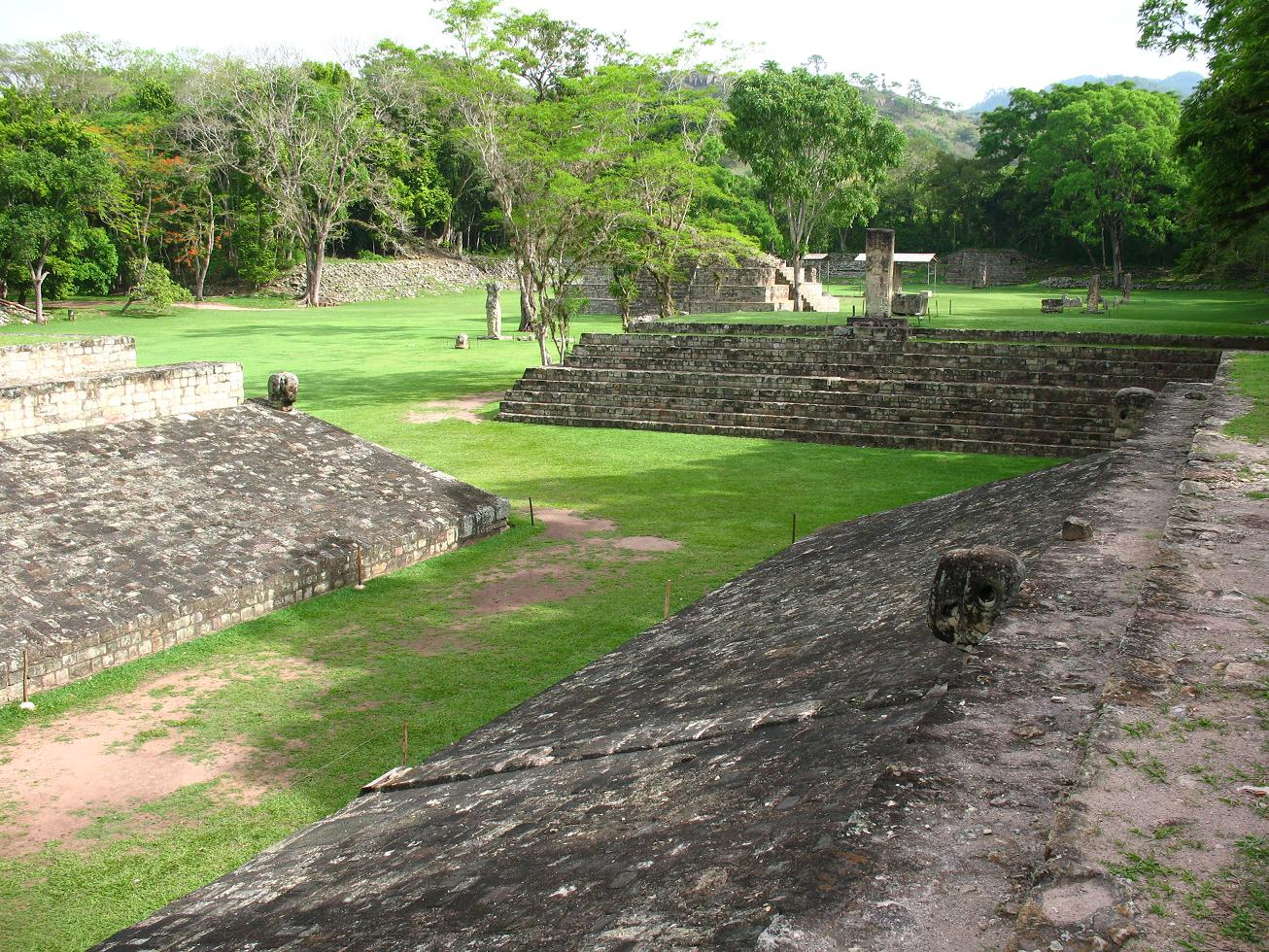
Ruins of the Maya city of Copán

Pre-Columbian Honduras was populated by a complex mixture of indigenous peoples representing a wide variety of cultural backgrounds and linguistic groups—the most advanced and notable of which were related to the Maya of the Yucatán and Guatemala. Maya civilization had reached western Honduras in the 5th century A.D., probably spreading from lowland Mayan centers in Guatemala's Petén region. The Maya spread rapidly through the Río Motagua Valley, centering their control on the major ceremonial center of Copán, near the present-day town of Santa Rosa de Copán. For three and a half centuries, the Maya developed the city, making it one of the principal centers of their culture. At one point, Copán was probably the leading center for both astronomical studies—in which the Maya were quite advanced—and art. One of the longest Maya hieroglyphic inscriptions ever discovered was found at Copán. The Maya also established extensive trade networks spanning as far as central Mexico. Then, at the height of the Maya civilization, Copán was apparently abandoned. The last hieroglyph date in Copán is 800 A.D. Much of the population evidently remained in the area after that, but the educated class—the priests and rulers who built the temples, inscribed the glyphs, and developed the astronomy and mathematics—suddenly vanished. Copán fell into ruin, and the descendants of the Maya who remained had no memory of the meanings of the inscriptions or of the reasons for the sudden fall.

=== Other indigenous groups ===
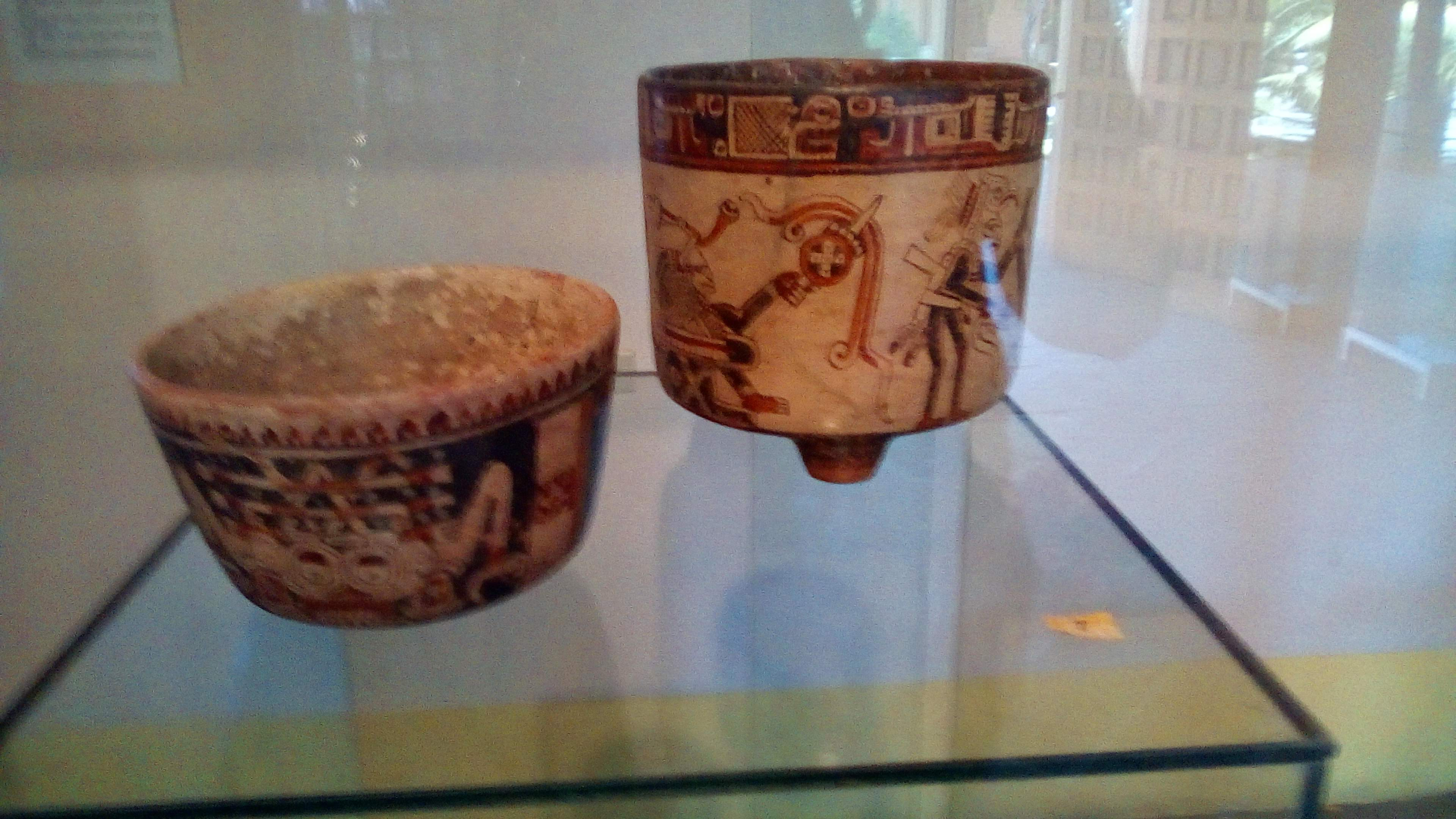
Lencan pottery

Following the period of Maya dominance, the area that would eventually comprise Honduras was occupied by a multiplicity of indigenous peoples. Indigenous groups related to the Toltec of central Mexico migrated from the northwest into parts of what became western and southern Honduras. Most notable were the Toltec-speaking Chorotega, who established themselves near the present-day city of Choluteca. Later enclaves of Nahua-speaking peoples, such as the Pipil, whose language was related to that of the Aztec, established themselves at various locations from the Caribbean coast to the Golfo de Fonseca on the Pacific coast.

While groups related to indigenous peoples of Mexico moved into western and southern Honduras, other peoples with languages related to those of the Chibcha of Colombia were establishing themselves in areas that became northeastern Honduras. Most prominent among these were the Ulva and Paya speakers. Along the Caribbean coast, a variety of groups settled. Most important were the Sumu, who were also located in Nicaragua, and the Jicaque, whose language family has been a source of debate among scholars. Finally, in parts of what is now west-central Honduras were the Lenca, who also were believed to have migrated north from Colombia but whose language shows little relation to any other indigenous group.

Although divided into numerous distinct and frequently hostile groups, the indigenous inhabitants of preconquest Honduras (before the early 16th century) carried on considerable trade with other parts of their immediate region as well as with areas as far away as Panama and Mexico. Although it appears that no major cities were in existence at the time of the conquest, the total population was nevertheless fairly high. Estimates range up to 2 million, although the actual figure was probably nearer to 500,000.

== Spanish conquest and settlement ==
=== Initial explorations ===
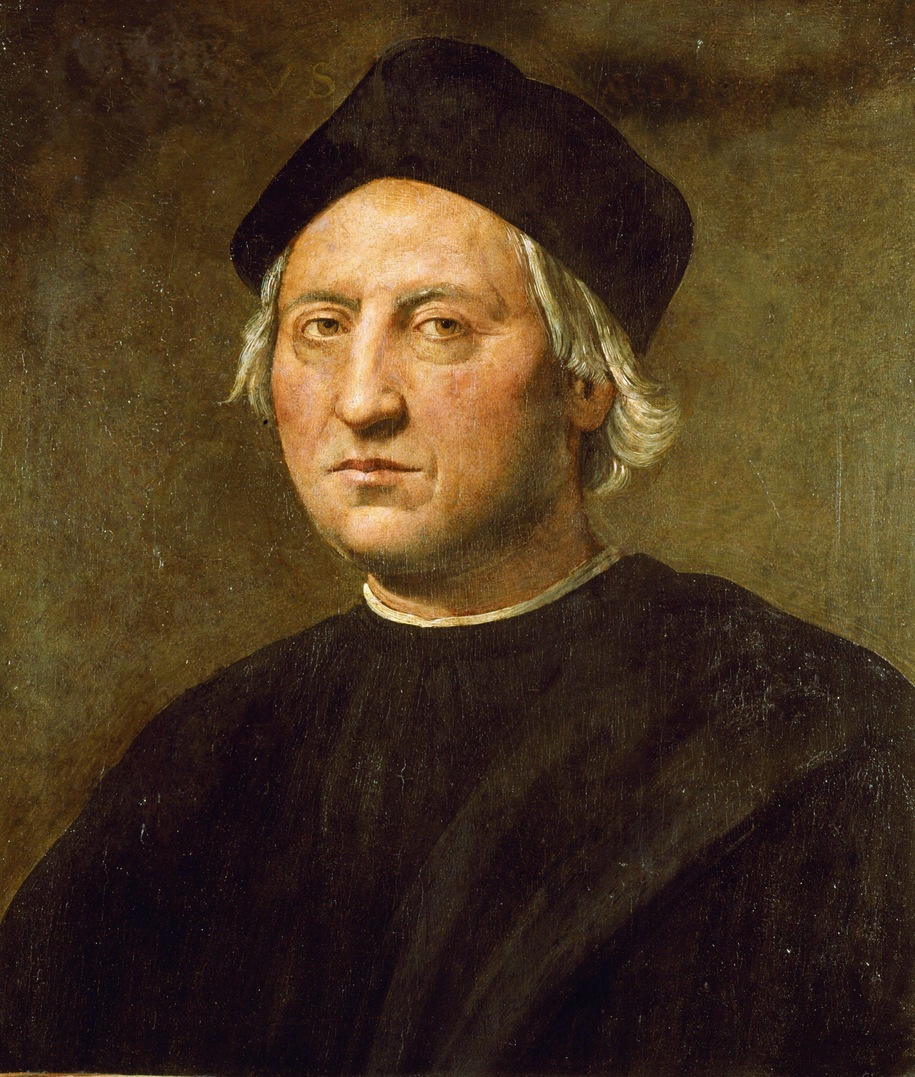
Christopher Columbus gave Honduras its name, meaning "depths".

European contacts with the indigenous population of Honduras began with the final voyage of Christopher Columbus. In 1502 Columbus sailed past the Islas de la Bahía (Bay Islands) and shortly thereafter reached the mainland of Central America. While at one of the islands, Columbus discovered and seized a large canoe loaded with a wide variety of trade goods. Evidence seems to indicate that the canoe's occupants were Mayan traders and that their encounter with Columbus marked his first direct contact with the civilizations of Mexican and northern Central America. Despite the fact that the canoe had been observed coming from the west, Columbus turned east and then south, sailing away from the civilizations and doing little exploring on the Honduran coast. His only direct legacy was the assigning of a few place names on the Caribbean coast, notably Guanaja for one of the Islas de la Bahía, Cabo Gracias a Dios for the eastern extremity of Honduras, and Honduras (depths in Spanish) for the overall region. The latter name suggests the deep waters off the northern coast.

Little exploration took place for the next two decades. Spanish navigators Juan Díaz de Solís and Vicente Yáñez Pinzón probably touched on part of the Honduran coast in 1508, during their 1508–1509 expedition, but devoted most of their efforts to exploring farther north. Some expeditions from the islands of Cuba and Hispaniola may have reached the mainland and certainly began to decimate the population of the Islas de la Bahía in the second decade of the century, but otherwise the Honduran Caribbean coast was a neglected area.

Interest in the mainland was dramatically revived as a result of the expedition of Hernán Cortés to Mexico. While Cortés was completing his conquest of the Aztec, expeditions from Mexico, Panama, and the Caribbean began to move into Central America. In 1523 part of an expedition headed by Gil González Dávila discovered the Golfo de Fonseca on the Pacific coast, naming it in honor of Bishop Juan Rodríguez de Fonseca. The following year, four separate Spanish land expeditions began the conquest of Honduras.

=== Era of the conquistadors ===
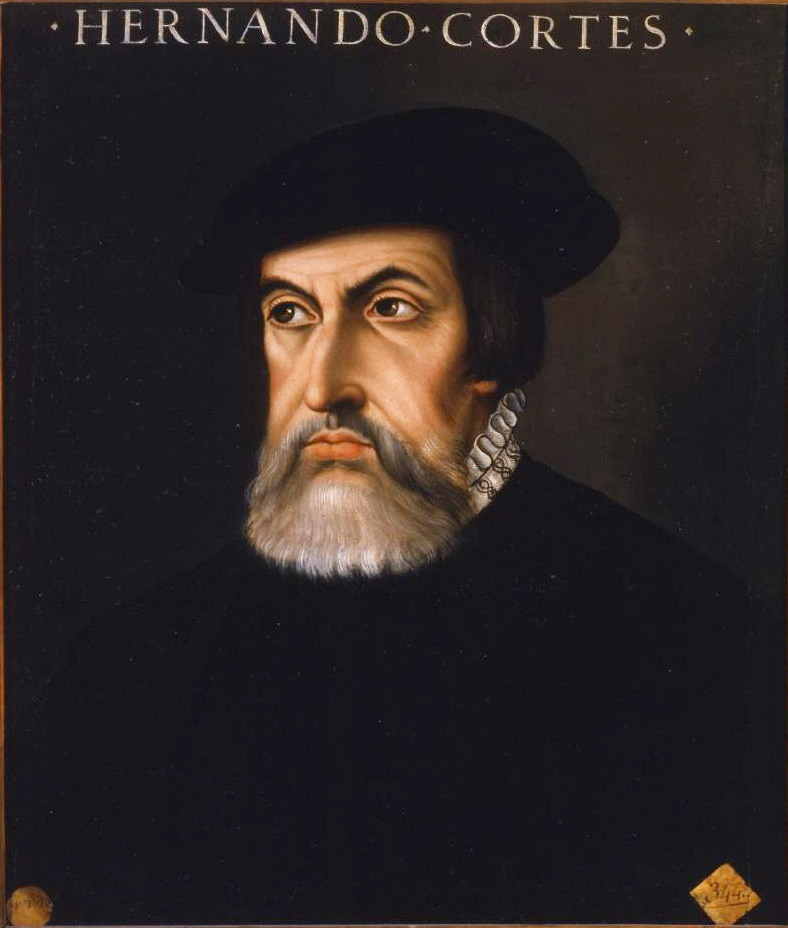
Hernán Cortés arrived to Honduras after the fall of the Aztec empire.

The nearly simultaneous invasions of Honduras in 1524 by rival Spanish expeditions began an era of conflict among rival Spanish claimants as well as with the indigenous population. The major initial expeditions were led by Gil González Dávila, who hoped to carve out a territory for his own rule, and by Cristóbal de Olid, who was dispatched from Cuba by Cortés. Once in Honduras, however, Olid succumbed to personal ambition and attempted to establish his own independent authority. Word of this reached Cortés in Mexico, and to restore his own authority, he ordered yet another expedition, this one under the command of Francisco de Las Casas. Then, doubting the trustworthiness of any subordinate, Cortés set out for Honduras himself. The situation was further complicated by the entry into Honduras of expeditions from Guatemala under Pedro de Alvarado and from Nicaragua under Hernando de Soto.

In the initial struggle for power, Olid seemed to gain the upper hand, capturing both González Dávila and Las Casas. His captives, however, having managed to subvert the loyalty of some of Olid's men, took Olid prisoner, and then promptly beheaded him. Although later condemned for this action by a Mexican court, none of the conspirators ever suffered any real punishment.

The arrival of Cortés in Honduras in 1525 temporarily restored some order to the Spanish conquest. He established his own authority over the rival claimants, obtained the submission of numerous indigenous chiefs, and tried to promote the creation of Spanish towns. His own headquarters was located at Trujillo on the Caribbean coast. In April 1526, Cortés returned to Mexico, and the remaining Spaniards resumed their strife.

Some order was again restored in October of that year when the first royal governor, Diego López de Salcedo, arrived. López de Salcedo's policies, however, drove many indigenous people, once pacified by Cortés, into open revolt. His attempt to extend his jurisdiction into Nicaragua resulted in his imprisonment by the authorities there. After agreeing to a Nicaraguan-imposed definition of the boundary between the two provinces, López de Salcedo was released but did not return to Honduras until 1529.

The early 1530s were not prosperous for Honduras. Renewed fighting among the Spaniards, revolts, and decimation of the settled indigenous population through disease, mistreatment, and exportation of large numbers to the Caribbean islands as slaves left the colony on the edge of collapse by 1534. The Spanish crown renamed the depressed province as Honduras-Higueras, subdividing it into two districts. Higueras encompassed the western part while the rest remained known as Honduras. The decline in population of the province continued, and only the direct intervention of Pedro de Alvarado from Guatemala in 1536 kept Higueras from being abandoned. Alvarado was attracted by the prospect of gold in the region, and, with the help of native Guatemalans who accompanied him, he soon developed a profitable gold-mining industry centered in the newly established town of Gracias. The discovery of gold and silver deposits attracted new settlers and increased the demand for indigenous labor. The enforced labor, however, led to renewed resistance by the native people that culminated in a major uprising in 1537. The leader of the uprising was a capable young Lenca chieftain known as Lempira (after whom the Honduran national monetary unit would eventually be named). Lempira established his base on a fortified hill known as the Peñol de Cerquín and until 1538 successfully defeated all efforts to subdue him. Inspired by his examples, other native inhabitants began revolting, and the entire district of Higueras seemed imperiled. Lempira was ultimately murdered while negotiating with the Spaniards. After his death, resistance rapidly disintegrated, although some fighting continued through 1539.

The defeat of Lempira's revolt accelerated the decimation of the indigenous population. In 1539 an estimated 15,000 Native Americans remained under Spanish control; two years later, there were only 8,000. Most of these were divided into encomiendas, a system that left the native people in their villages but placed them under the control of individual Spanish settlers. Under terms of the encomienda system, the Spaniards were supposed to provide the indigenous people with religious instruction and collect tribute from them for the crown. In return, the Spaniards were entitled to a supposedly limited use of indigenous labor. As the native population declined, the settlers exploited those remaining even more ruthlessly. This exploitation led to a clash between the Spanish settlers and authorities on one side and on the other side the Roman Catholic Church led by Father Cristóbal de Pedraza, who, in 1542 became the first bishop of Honduras. Bishop Pedraza, like others after him, had little success in his efforts to protect the native people.

== Failure in the North ==
While the Spanish had great success in the conquest and colonization of the Pacific parts of the country, they had much less success in the north. The northeastern region, known to the Spanish by a Nahuatl name Taguzgalpa, resisted repeated attempts at conquest successfully. Orders or grants for conquest were issued in 1545, 1562, 1567 and 1594, with no appreciable Spanish progress being reported. When these efforts failed, the Spanish attempted to "reduce" Taguzgalpa and neighboring Tologalpa (located in Nicaragua) through missionary efforts that began in 1604 and continued intermittently throughout the remainder of the Spanish period. In their efforts the missionaries sought to convert the inhabitants to Christianity and to persuade them to settle in missionary supervised new villages. While some reported conversions in the thousands, the total number resettled never amount to more than a few hundred.

On the eastern side of the north coast, the Spanish had more luck. The earliest settlers established coastal ports at Puerto de Caballos (today's Puerto Cortés), Trujillo and Gracias a Dios, as well as interior posts at San Pedro Sula and Naco. The latter experienced some growth during a brief gold rush in the 16th century, but in subsequent periods declined. There is some evidence that the Spanish presence was fairly strictly limited to just these towns and that a fairly thickly settled countryside was completely outside their control. However, in much of the 16th and 17th centuries, the Spanish on the Pacific side shipped good across the uncontrolled space to the ports for trans-shipment to Spain.

The failure of the Spanish to control the north coast left the region open to outsiders who were prepared to work with the local people against Spanish interests, and thus northern Europeans began trading and eventually settling in the northern areas during the various wars between England, the Netherlands and Spain of the period 1580 to 1625.

== Colonial Honduras ==
=== Spread of colonization and growth of mining ===
The defeat of Lempira's revolt, the establishment of the bishopric (first at Trujillo, then at Comayagua after Pedraza's death), and the decline in fighting among rival Spanish factions all contributed to expanded settlement and increased economic activity in the 1540s. A variety of agricultural activities was developed, including cattle ranching and, for a time, the harvesting of large quantities of sarsaparilla root. But the key economic activity of 16th-century Honduras was mining gold and silver.

The initial mining centers were located near the Guatemalan border, around Gracias. In 1538 these mines produced significant quantities of gold. In the early 1540s, the center for mining shifted eastward to the Río Guayape Valley, and silver joined gold as a major product. This change contributed to the rapid decline of Gracias and the rise of Comayagua as the center of colonial Honduras. The demand for labor also led to further revolts and accelerated the decimation of the native population. As a result, African slavery was introduced into Honduras, and by 1545 the province may have had as many as 2,000 slaves. Other gold deposits were found near San Pedro Sula and the port of Trujillo. By the late 1540s, Honduras seemed headed for relative prosperity and influence, a development marked by the establishment in 1544 of the regional audiencia of Guatemala with its capital at Gracias, Honduras. The audiencia was a Spanish governmental unit encompassing both judicial and legislative functions whose president held the additional titles of governor and captain general (hence the alternative name of Captaincy General of Guatemala). The location of the capital was bitterly resented by the more populous centers in Guatemala and El Salvador, and in 1549 the capital of the audiencia was moved to Antigua, Guatemala.

Mining production began to decline in the 1560s, and Honduras rapidly declined in importance. The subordination of Honduras to the Captaincy General of Guatemala had been reaffirmed with the move of the capital to Antigua, and the status of Honduras as a province within the Captaincy General of Guatemala would be maintained until independence. Beginning in 1569, new silver strikes in the interior briefly revived the economy and led to the founding of the town of Tegucigalpa, which soon began to rival Comayagua as the most important town in the province. But the silver boom peaked in 1584, and economic depression returned shortly thereafter. Mining efforts in Honduras were hampered by a lack of capital and labor, difficult terrain, the limited size of many gold and silver deposits, and bureaucratic regulations and incompetence. Mercury, vital to the production of silver, was constantly in short supply; once an entire year's supply was lost through the negligence of officials. By the 17th century, Honduras had become a poor and neglected backwater of the Spanish colonial empire, having a scattered population of mestizos, native people, blacks, and a handful of Spanish rulers and landowners.

=== Colonial society, economy, and government ===
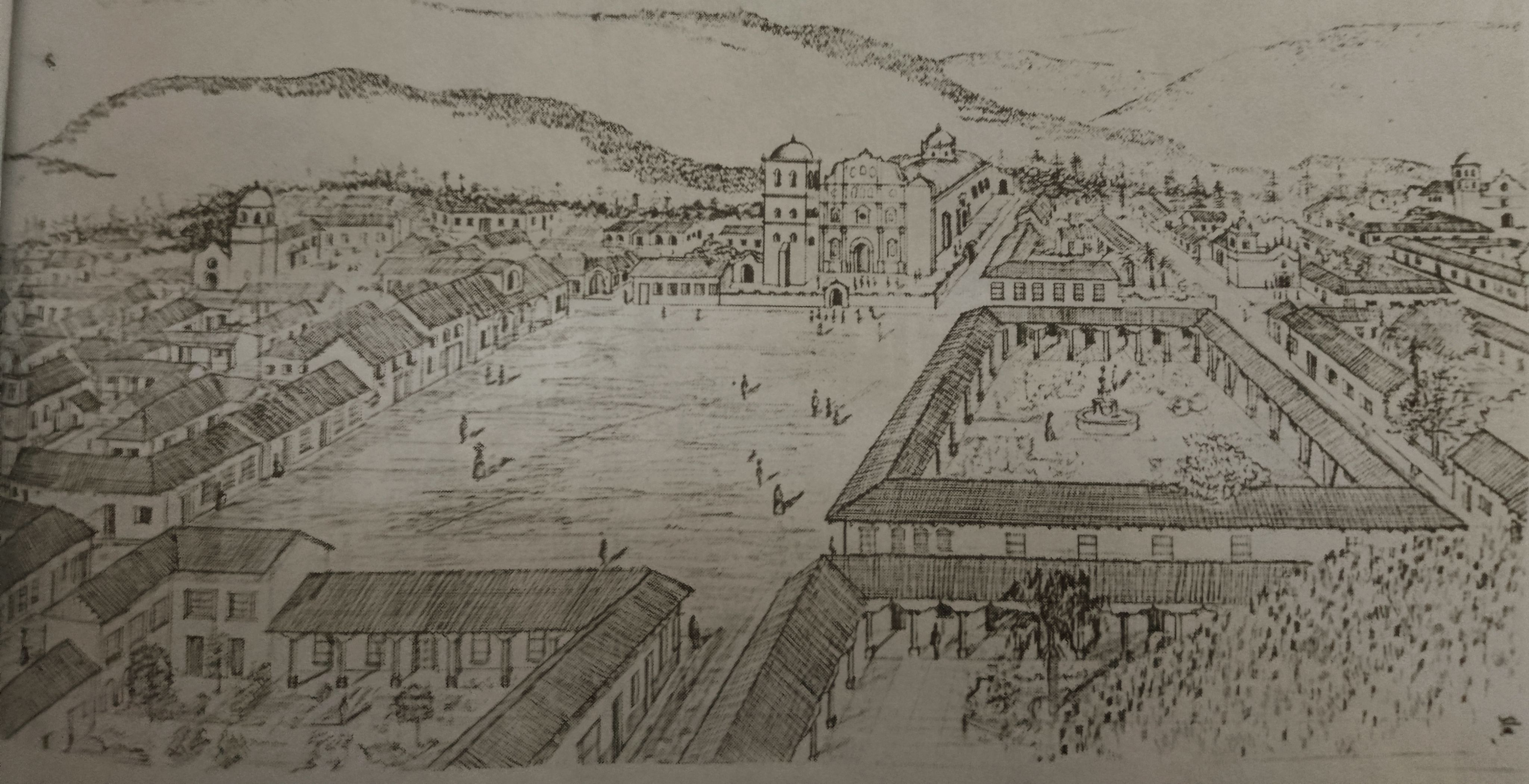
Santa María de la Nueva Valladolid de Comayagua, the capital of the province of Honduras in the early 18th century

Although mining provided much of the limited revenue Honduras generated for the Spanish crown, a majority of the inhabitants were engaged in agriculture. Attempts to promote agricultural exports had limited success, however, and most production remained on a subsistence level. If anything, the province became more rural during the 17th and 18th centuries. As a result of economic declines or foreign attacks, several town governments simply ceased to function during this period.

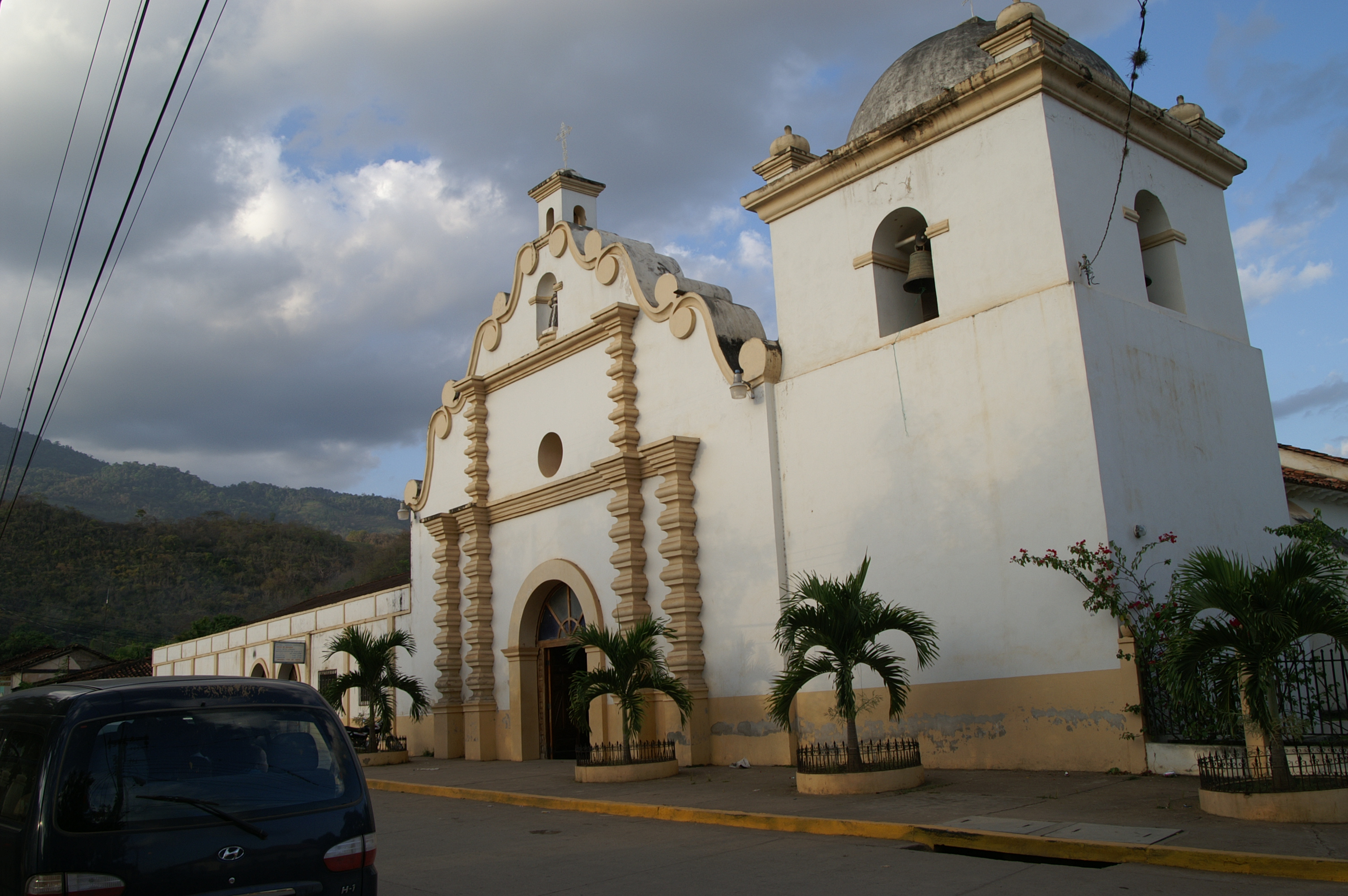
Old colonial church of Catacamas

The cattle industry was probably the most important agricultural activity. Much of the cattle industry was on a small scale, but by 1714 six ranchers in the areas of the present-day departments of Yoro and Olancho owned over 1,000 head of cattle each. Some of the cattle were driven to Guatemala for sale. Such sales, however, occasionally produced meat shortages in Honduras and led to conflicts between Guatemalan and Honduran provincial officials.

Much of the Honduran interior remained uncolonized and outside of effective Spanish control during the colonial era. The Jicaque, fleeing into the hills, managed to retain considerable cultural autonomy. Other indigenous groups, however, were increasingly brought under Spanish influence and began to lose their separate identities. This assimilation was facilitated by occasional expeditions of government and church officials into new areas. One such expedition into Yoro in 1689 found forty villages of native people living outside of effective Spanish control.

By the end of the 17th century, governing Honduras had become a frustrating, thankless task. Only Comayagua, with 144 families, and Tegucigalpa, with 135, had over 100 Spanish settlers. The province boasted little in the way of education or culture. The lack of good ports, especially on the Pacific coast, limited contacts with the outside world. Whenever possible, the Spanish colonists forced native people to move to the Tegucigalpa area, where they were available for labor in the mines. However, illegal resettlement and corruption in the mining industry—where every available ruse was used to avoid paying taxes—created a constant series of problems for colonial authorities. Smuggling, especially on the Caribbean coast, was also a serious problem.

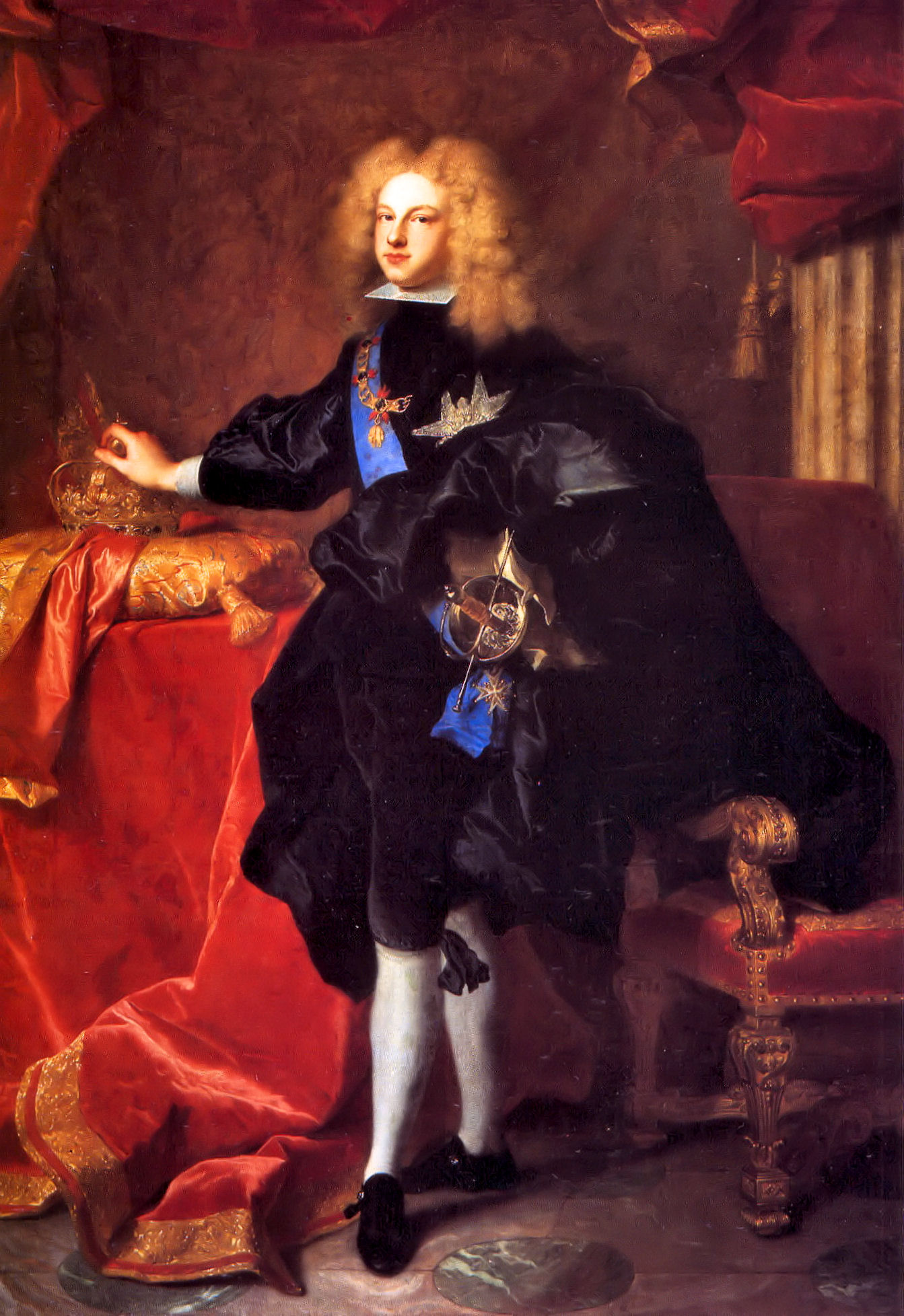
Philip V and subsequent Bourbon rulers of Spain brought change to Honduras.

Early in the 18th century, the Bourbon Dynasty, linked to the rulers of France, replaced the Habsburgs on the throne of Spain and brought change to Honduras. The new dynasty began a series of reforms throughout the empire designed to make administration more efficient and profitable and to facilitate the defense of the colonies. Among these reforms was a reduction in the tax on precious minerals and in the cost of mercury, which was a royal monopoly. In Honduras these reforms contributed to a revival of the mining industry in the 1730s. Efforts to promote the Honduran tobacco industry as a royal monopoly proved less effective and encountered stiff local opposition. The same was true of plans to improve tax collection. Ultimately, the Bourbons abolished most of the corrupt local governmental units, replacing them in 1787 with a system of intendencias (the name of the new local unit and also its administrator, a royal official who supervised tax collections and commercial matters, controlled prices and credit, and exercised some judicial functions).

=== Anglo-Spanish rivalry ===
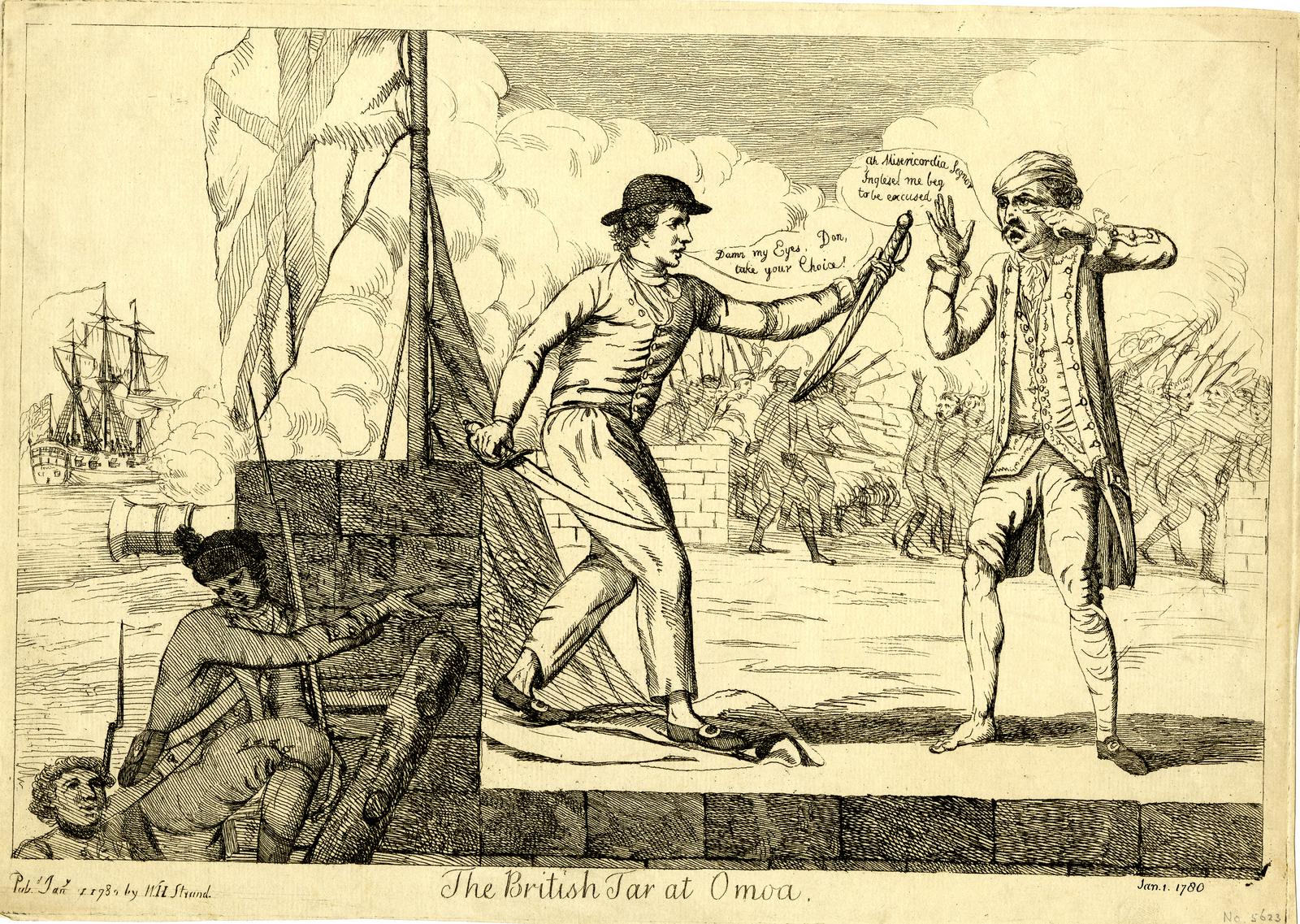
British invasion of Omoa

A major problem for Spanish rulers of Honduras was the activity of the English along the northern Caribbean coast. These activities began in the late 16th century and continued into the 19th century. In the early years, Dutch as well as English corsairs (pirates) attacked the Caribbean coast, but as time passed the threat came almost exclusively from the English. In 1643 one English expedition destroyed the town of Trujillo, the major port for Honduras, leaving it virtually abandoned for over a century.

Destructive as they were, raiding expeditions were lesser problems than other threats. Beginning in the 17th century, English efforts to plant colonies along the Caribbean coast and in the Islas de la Bahía threatened to cut Honduras off from the Caribbean and raised the possibility of the loss of much of its territory. The English effort on the Honduran coast was heavily dependent on the support of groups known as the Zambo and the Miskito, racially mixed peoples of Native American and African ancestry who were usually more than willing to attack Spanish settlements. British settlers were interested largely in trading, lumbering, and producing pitch. During the numerous 18th-century wars between Britain and Spain, however, the British crown found any activity that challenged Spanish hegemony on the Caribbean coast of Central America to be desirable.

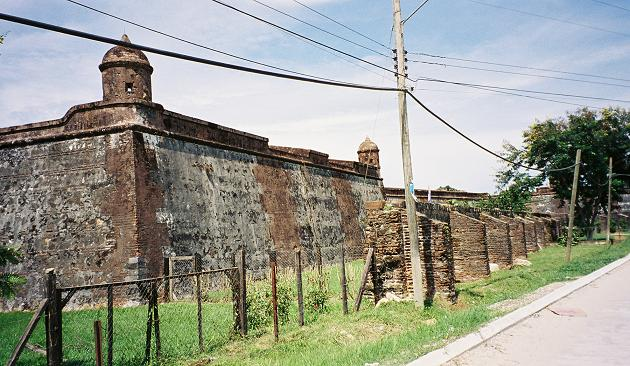
Fort at San Fernando de Omoa

Major British settlements were established at Cabo Gracias a Dios and to the west at the mouth of the Río Sico, as well as on the Islas de la Bahía. By 1759 a Spanish agent estimated the population in the Río Sico area as 3,706.

Under the Bourbons, the revitalized Spanish government made several efforts to regain control over the Caribbean coast. In 1752 a major fort was constructed at San Fernando de Omoa near the Guatemalan border. In 1780 the Spanish returned in force to Trujillo, which they began developing as a base for expeditions against British settlements to the east. During the 1780s, the Spanish regained control over the Islas de la Bahía and drove the majority of the British and their allies out of the area around Black River. A British expedition briefly recaptured Black River, but the terms of the Anglo-Spanish Convention of 1786 gave definitive recognition to Spanish sovereignty over the Caribbean coast.

== To independence ==
=== Collapse of Spanish rule ===
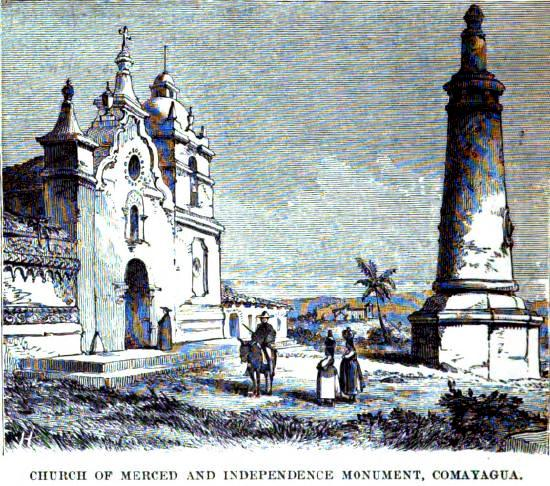
Comayagua after the independence

In the early 19th century, Spanish power went into rapid decline. Although Spain was allied with France during the Napoleonic Wars, in 1808 Napoleon Bonaparte forced the Spanish king to abdicate and put a Bonaparte on the Spanish throne. In response, Spanish people erupted in revolt in Madrid and throughout Spain, setting off a chain of uprisings in Latin America. In Honduras, resentment against rule by the exiled Spanish king increased rapidly, especially because increased taxes for Spain's struggle against the French threatened the cattle industry. In 1812 disturbances that broke out in Tegucigalpa were more linked to long-standing rivalry with Comayagua, however, than to opposition to Spanish rule. The disturbances were quickly controlled, and, to appease local discontent, the municipal government of Tegucigalpa was reestablished.

The rivalry between Tegucigalpa and Comayagua helped precipitate the final collapse of Spanish authority in Honduras. A new Spanish administration attempted to transfer Comayagua's tobacco factory to Tegucigalpa. This move led to defiance by Comayagua, which refused to acknowledge the authority of the government in Guatemala. The weakened Spanish government was unable to end Comayagua's defiance, and for a time civil strife threatened to break out. Conflict was averted by the decision made by all the Central American provinces on September 15, 1821, to declare their independence from Spain. This action failed to resolve the dispute between Tegucigalpa and Comayagua, however; the former now urged the creation of a unified Central American state, while the latter favored union with the First Mexican Empire under the rule of General Agustín de Iturbide. Ultimately, Comayagua's position prevailed, and in early 1822 the Central American provinces declared their allegiance to Mexico.

This union lasted just over a year and produced few if any benefits for either party. In March 1823, Iturbide was overthrown in Mexico, and the empire was replaced by a republic. The Central American Congress, in which Comayagua but not Tegucigalpa was represented, was quickly convened. With little debate, the United Provinces of Central America declared their independence from Mexico. Mexico's only effort to reverse this decision consisted in maintaining control over Chiapas, the northernmost of the six previous provinces of Central America.

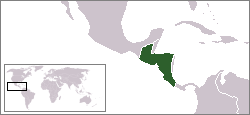
United Provinces of Central America

From its 1823 inception, the new federation (the United Provinces of Central America) faced a series of ultimately unresolvable problems. Instead of engendering a spirit of unity, Spanish rule had fostered divisions and local suspicions. In the case of Honduras, this divisiveness was epitomized by the rivalry between Tegucigalpa and Comayagua. There was even some sentiment for admitting these two cities as separate provinces within the federation, but that proposal was ultimately rejected. In addition, much of the region was suspicious of Guatemalan ambitions to dominate Central America and wished to retain all possible local authority rather than surrender any to a central government.

At least equally serious was the division of the politically active population into conservative and liberal factions. The conservatives favored a more centralized government; a proclerical policy, including a church monopoly over education; and a more aristocratic form of government based on traditional Spanish values. The liberals wanted greater local autonomy and a restricted role for the church, as well as political and economic development as in the United States and parts of Western Europe. The conservatives favored keeping native people in their traditional, subservient position, while the liberals aimed at eventually eliminating indigenous society by incorporating it into the national, Hispanic culture.

At the time of Central American independence (1823), Honduras was among the least-developed and least-populated provinces. In 1824 its population was estimated at just over 137,000. Despite its meager population, Honduras produced two of the most prominent leaders of the federation, the liberal Francisco Morazán (nicknamed the "George Washington of Central America") and the conservative José Cecilio del Valle. In 1823 del Valle was narrowly defeated by liberal Manuel José Arce for election as the federation's first president. Morazán overthrew Arce in 1829 and was elected president of the federation in 1830, defeating del Valle.

The beginning of Morazán's administration in 1830 saw some efforts to reform and promote education. Success was limited, however, because of lack of funds and internal fighting. In the elections of 1834, del Valle defeated Morazán, but del Valle died before taking office, and the legislature offered Morazán the presidency. With clerical support, a conservative uprising began in Guatemala in 1837, and within a year the federation had begun to dissolve. On May 30, 1838, the Central American Congress removed Morazán from office, declared that the individual states could establish their own governments, and on July 7 recognized these as "sovereign, free, and independent political bodies."

For Honduras, the period of federation had been disastrous. Local rivalries and ideological disputes had produced political chaos and disrupted the economy. The British had taken advantage of the chaotic condition to reestablish their control over the Islas de la Bahía. As a result, Honduras wasted little time in formally seceding from the federation once it was free to do so. Independence was declared on November 15, 1838.
