= EDQ =

EDQ may refer to:

- Economic Development Quarterly, a peer-reviewed academic journal covering the field of economics
- Erandique Airport (IATA: EDQ), an airstrip serving the town of Erandique in Lempira Department, Honduras
