= Francisco del Castillo y Rada =

Spanish officer in Honduras

Don Francisco del Castillo y Rada (18th century) was a prominent Spanish military officer and nobleman of Castilian lineage who played a significant role during the colonial era of Honduras.

== Biography ==
Captain Don Francisco del Castillo y Rada was noted in Comayagua, serving as Lieutenant Governor in the Cuscateca Valley and founding the Villa de Sevilla of Danlí. His prominence began in 1742 when he held the position of Lieutenant Mayor of Danlí. He served in this role, with brief interruptions, until 1774, when he was succeeded by Spanish Cavalry Captain Don José de Medina y Valderas.

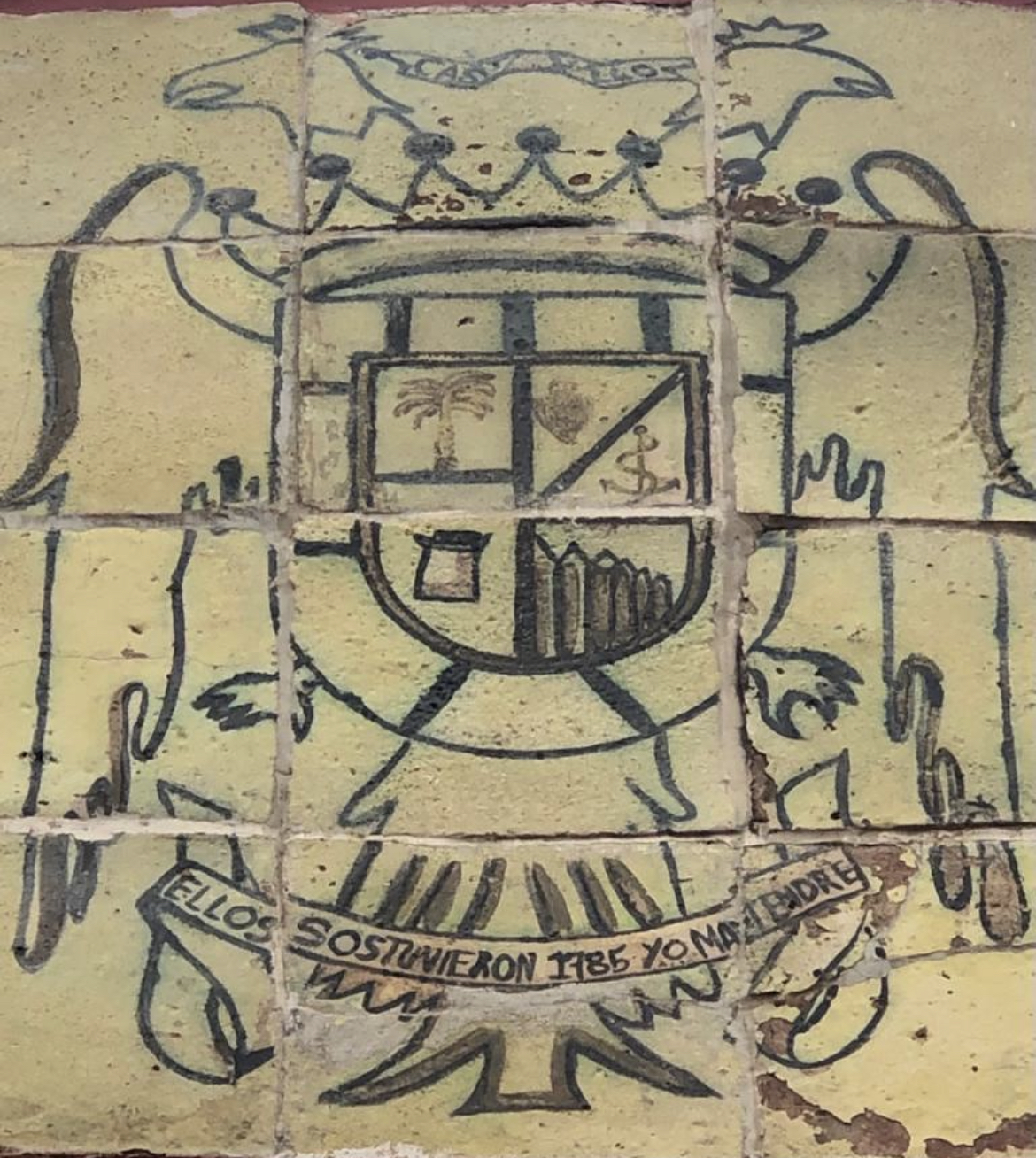
This coat of arms is present at the entrance of the property with the quote, "Castillo es por San Cayo, ellos sostuvieron yo mantendré año 1785"

By 1785, Francisco del Castillo y Rada purchased a manor in the town square of the then capital of Honduras, Comayagua. The manor was originally built by the conquistador Alonso de Cáceres y Retes when the capital of Honduras was switched from Trujillo to Comayagua. Cáceres intended for the home to be the dwelling place of the governor of Honduras, a role he himself fulfilled at the time. The home was passed down his family for many generations, until it was eventually purchased by Castillo y Rada, who purchased it for 3,000 pesos. Even though the exact purchase date is unknown, it is evident that Castillo y Rada owned the home by 1785 based on the coat of arms present above the entrance. Today, the home is known as the Museo Casa Colonial Familia Castillo, or simply Casa Castillo.

Don Francisco del Castillo y Rada had a son of the same first and last names, Francisco del Castillo y Rada II. Not much is known about Castillo y Rada's death.

== Founding of Villa de Sevilla ==
In a notable act of generosity, Don Francisco del Castillo y Rada and his ancestors donated two ancient landholdings to the Holy Sacrament, equivalent to one-third of the site of San Isidro del Tablón. This area now forms the major part of the elected lands of Danlí, highlighting his family’s longstanding influence and commitment to the region’s development.

A historical document referenced in “El Paternalismo y la Esclavitud Negra en El Real Minas de Tegucigalpa” mentions a significant event in which Don Francisco del Castillo y Rada, serving as the Lieutenant Governor in the Valley of Cuscateca, witnessed the emancipation of various slaves. Don Francisco Idiáquez, in the presence of Castillo y Rada, granted freedom to his slaves: Francisco, a 20-year-old white mulatto; María, an 18-year-old white mulatto; José, a 15-year-old light-skinned mulatto; and Ventura, a 12-year-old mulatto. All were the children of his enslaved woman, María José de Alemán, and were born and raised in his household. This act of emancipation not only liberated them from slavery but also from servitude and lordship, allowing them to live and contract freely. According to the details written on the document, this event took place in the Villa de Sevilla de Danlí on October 12, 1735.

== Celebrating the Coronation of King Carlos III ==
On December 24, 1760, Captain Don Francisco del Castillo y Rada, the Lieutenant Mayor of the Villa de la Inmaculada Concepción de Danlí and its district, orchestrated an elaborate celebration to honor the coronation of the new monarch, Carlos III of Spain and the Indies. The festivities began on December 27, with captains and other officers forming squares, accompanied by mounted locals carrying the royal banner emblazoned with the royal arms. In the town square, the captains paid homage to the banner with a general salute from their weapons. Later that evening, a grand parade commenced, featuring saints, floats, clarions, and chirimías, accompanied by fireworks and gunfire.

On December 28, at 9:15 in the morning, prominent locals gathered at the theater where the royal banner was displayed. Captain del Castillo y Rada ascended the stage and called for silence. Once the music and revelry ceased, he proclaimed, “Hear ye, hear ye, hear ye. Danlí, know that this royal banner I carry and hoist is for our King and Natural Lord, Carlos III.” The crowd responded with cheers of “Long live, long live our King and Natural Lord!” Castillo y Rada then scattered a handful of coins, followed by his officers. The assembly moved to the parish, where the priest, donning a great cape, received them, and a ceremonial mass was sung.

The celebrations, which concluded on January 3, 1761, spanned six days of general jubilation. The program included three comedies, two colloquies (both with praises), a dance representing the Battle of Moors and Christians, four horseback tournaments, four bullfights, and a ring competition.
