= Peñol de Cerquín =

Lenca fortress that existed during the Spanish conquest of Honduras

Coordinates: 14°10′50.2″N 88°29′33.1″W

Location of the Peñol de Cerquín in Honduras

The Peñol de Cerquín (Spanish pronunciation: [peˈɲol de seɾˈkin]): "Rock of Cerquín") was a mountaintop Lenca fortress in southern Honduras during the Contact Period (1520–1540). The Peñol de Cerquín was a key Lenca stronghold during the Great Revolt of 1537 against the Spanish conquest. The defences were formidable, and the Lenca warleader Lempira strengthened the fortifications considerably, and used it as his base of operations. The hardened veteran Spanish conquistadores considered the fortress to be as strong as anything they had seen in Europe.

The first Spanish expedition to pass the Peñol was led by Pedro de Alvarado in early 1536, but he did not attempt an assault. A few months later Alvarado sent his lieutenant Juan de Chávez against the fortress; his initial assault was defeated, and the siege that followed it faltered due to supply problems. Over the next year, Spanish expeditions in the general region were moderately successful, and the Spanish considered the area pacified. Unknown to the Spanish, Lempira had been fortifying the Peñol in secret, and he amassed a great number of warriors and a great quantity of supplies there before openly declaring war in late 1537. The Spanish captain Alonso de Cáceres laid siege to the fortress at the beginning of November. In spring of 1538, Lempira agreed to a parley with the Spanish, and was shot dead during the negotiations. The surprise Spanish assault that followed quickly overran the demoralised defenders, and the fortress fell to the European invaders.

== Etymology ==
Cerquín was the name of an ancient Lenca province, while peñol is Spanish, meaning a rocky crag, or butte.

== Location ==
The Peñol de Cerquín is located in the southeast of the Lempira Department of Honduras, in Central America. The site lies within the municipality of Erandique. The Peñol de Cerquín is to the south of the town, on the far side of the Sierra de las Neblinas, in the region of the hamlet of San Antonio La Mina.

== Description ==
The summit of the Peñol de Cerquín presents a ridge line with a surface area of approximately 4,000 square metres (43,000 sq ft). The available surface area was increased by narrow terraces supported by retaining walls on both sides. Investigators Doris Stone and Federico Lunardi both described the site, and reported the presence of fortifications, retaining walls, and engraved rocks, as well as artefacts that included ceramic remains, metates, and worked obsidian. Investigators in the 1940s climbed the Peñol and described finding the remains of a number of buildings, and the possible remains of a reservoir.

There is a quantity of rock art at the site, either engraved or picketed depending upon the form. Small oval and sub-circular petroglyphs were made using the picketing technique, while quadrangular forms and a spiral were cut into the rock with unbroken lines. A polychrome ceramic fragment is similar in style to Late Classic (c. 600–900 AD) Maya ceramics of the Copán valley, and the presence of petroglyphs suggest that the Peñol de Cerquín had an early history as a sacred site, later pressed into service as a fortress by Lempira.

== Spanish conquest ==
Pedro de Alvarado passed close to the Peñol de Cerquín in 1536, with eighty mixed Spanish infantry and cavalry, and some 3000 native Guatemalan auxiliaries. Alvarado was anxious to relieve a beleaguered Spanish garrison elsewhere, so he did not attempt an attack against the gathered warriors in what was obviously a strong fortification, and passed onwards without engaging the defenders. When Alvarado had established himself in the Naco valley of Honduras, he sent his lieutenant Juan de Chávez southwards with 40–50 Spanish soldiers, and 1500–2000 native auxiliaries. Chávez approached the Peñol de Cerquín towards the middle of 1536, to find it defended by a great many indigenous warriors who had gathered there to resist the Spanish. Chávez launched an assault against the fortress, but was beaten back before he could reach the base of the Peñol, so he laid siege to it. Chávez' force was short of supplies, and the natives had stripped the area of any food that the invaders could make use of. Given the strength of the fortress, his men became rebellious, and wished to return to their homes in Guatemala, and Chávez was forced to call off the siege.

Further Spanish expeditions in the general area were moderately successful, and they believed the region largely pacified. However, the Lenca warlord Lempira was secretly gathering a strong force of warriors at the Peñol, together with weapons and provisions. Lempira fortified the already formidable natural defences and, in late 1537, he openly declared war against the Spanish. The natives, including women and children, abandoned their villages and lands and gathered at the fortress. The Peñol de Cerquín was crucial to Lempira's rebellion against the Spanish, and successful resistance there was a powerful symbol to indigenous peoples throughout the province of Honduras and beyond. In response to the open challenge to Spanish authority, Francisco de Montejo, who had replaced Pedro de Alvarado as governor of Honduras, despatched his lieutenant Alonso de Cáceres with eighty Spanish soldiers and a large number of native auxiliaries from Mexico and Guatemala. Cáceres arrived below the fortress around 1 November 1537. Cáceres immediately laid siege to the Peñol, hoping to starve the defenders into submission. There followed a series of attacks and counterattacks, and the Spanish closed the eight approaches to the mountain, although they were unable to make any advance. Five Spaniards died during the initial fighting, and many more were wounded, including Cáceres. Constant fighting dragged on for months, and the Spanish were unable to maintain supply lines through hostile territory and were often short of provisions. In spring of 1538 the rain season began, which added to the attackers' difficulties. Desperate to bring the siege to a conclusion, Cáceres called a parley with Lempira. The Lenca general approached in full battle regalia, including feathered headdress and cotton armour. He refused Cáceres' demand that he submit, at which point a hidden Spanish arquebusier shot Lempira through the head. This was the signal for a surprise Spanish assault, which quickly overran the shocked and demoralised defenders. The Peñol de Cerquín rapidly fell to the invaders. Many warriors surrendered without further resistance, while a portion of them fled into the surrounding mountains. Many elderly, women, and children were also captured by the Spanish.

== Historical documents ==
The Peñol de Cerquín was described in a letter from conquistador Francisco de Montejo to the king of Spain, dated 10 June 1539. Also in 1539, Spanish bishop Cristóbal de Pedraza wrote a report that included the testimonies of various Spanish soldiers who had been present at the siege of the Peñol de Cerquín. In the early 17th century, Antonio de Herrera y Tordesillas produced his monumental Historia General de los Hechos de los Castellanos en las Islas y Tierra Firme del Mar Oceáno, which included an account of the battle of Cerquín.

== Investigations ==
The area of the Peñol de Cerquín was investigated by Italian archaeologist Federico Lunardi in the 1940s, and by the American archaeologist Doris Stone in the 1950s. A French team led by Eric Gelliot carried out further investigations in 2011–2012.
