= Erandique =

- Municipality
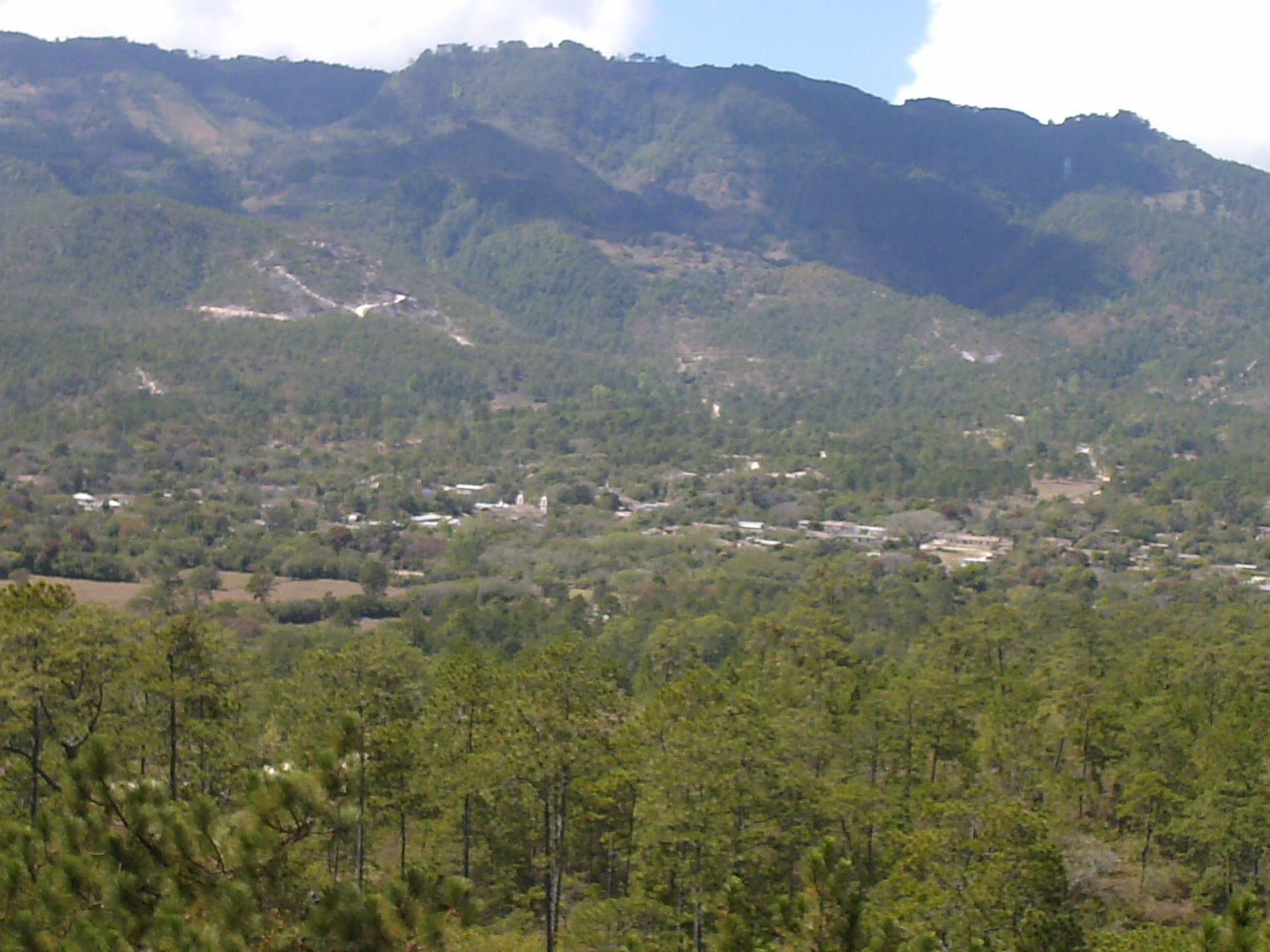
- Panoramic view of Erandique

- Location in Honduras
- Coordinates: 14°14′N 88°28′W
- Country: Honduras
- Department: Lempira
- Founded: 1600
- City since: 3 March 1932; 94 years ago

Area
  - Total: 294 km^{2} (114 sq mi)

Population (2015)
  - Total: 15,633
  - Density: 53.2/km^{2} (138/sq mi)
- Climate: Aw

Erandique is a municipality in the Lempira Department of Honduras.

Erandique is one of the several municipalities of the Lempira department. One has to travel 65 kilometres (40 mi) on road CA11A from the city of Gracias passing by San Juan (del Caite). A second road (V-787) that leads to Erandique is going by the town of "Dolores" in Intibuca. Also this roads leads to the municipality of San Francisco. The main disadvantage of this second road is that is not repaired often. If one enters from San Juan, Erandique has one exit to San Francisco and the other to the rest of the municipalities such as San Andrés and so on.

The town is served by Erandique (Gualguire) Airport, a grass airstrip 3 kilometres (1.9 mi) east of town.

== History ==
Erandique was founded in 1600 under the name of "Cerquin", due to its location on the west of the Cerquin hill. It was registered in 1733 in the volume II of the Real State book, dated on 28 November. According to tales from elderly citizens, the original act was lost and it was replaced on 14 February 1882, in the administration of Dr Marco Aurelio Soto. Erandique is one of the oldest municipalities and it became a city on 3 March 1932.

== Geography ==
Erandique is still surrounded by pine forests, with some pockets of Sweetgum (Liquidambar) trees. The terrain is rugged, characterised by steep hills. The weather is cool during the rainy season (May–October), and warmer in the dry season. The predominant soil is derived from volcanic rocks. During the rainy season, this soil that forms from the degradation of the rocks becomes extremely slippery, and it is common for unpaved roads to wash away and for routes to become impassable. Many of the pine forests are still used as a source of biofuel for the local population.

== Boundaries ==
Its boundaries are:

- North : Santa Cruz municipality and Intibuca department.
- South : Piraera and San Francisco municipalities.
- East : Intibuca department.
- West : San Andrés and Gualcince municipalities.
- Surface Extents: 294 km^{2}

== Resources ==
Coffee production is an integral part of Erandique’s economy since the coffee plantation farms are found in the surrounding highland villages and hills like Cerquin, whereas the center of the town is the place for collection and processing of the crops. Secondary forms of agriculture practiced here include growing of corn, beans, vegetables, and cattle ranching on a small scale. There is national electricity, telephone and mobile coverage along with a petrol station and buses to Gracias and La Esperanza. There is a small local hospital and ambulance transport to Gracias for emergencies, as well as a volunteer-operated clinic for poor patients.

== Population ==
Half of the population in Erandique are descended from native Indians. The other half of the population is mestizo (mixed-race ). During the holidays and other activities is when the direct descendants are seen; they still prefer to live isolated.

- Population: The figure was 11,700 in 2001. An estimate was based on this, to have the figure of 13,845 people for 2008.
- Villages: 15
- Settlements: 132

=== Demographics ===
At the time of the 2013 Honduras census, Erandique municipality had a population of 15,242. Of these, 80.26% were Indigenous (80.17% Lenca), 18.34% Mestizo, 0.69% Black or Afro-Honduran, 0.52% White and 0.19% others.

== Tourism ==
The landscapes in Erandique are known nationwide for its pine and sweetgum (Liquidambar) forests. The people from Erandique are hospitable. The town has multiple internet access sites. Several venues serve local traditional cuisine, and one offers an expanded menu including shrimps and seafood soup, with ingredients sourced from the coastal city of La Ceiba. Downtown, visitors can see many historical adobe houses. Some streets are paved with rocks and two historic churches are available for touring.

- Local Holidays: "San Sebastian" day on 20 January. "Virgen de La Merced" on 8 September, "San Antonio" on 13 June. Also on 20 July it is celebrated "Lempira" national day for the first national hero who fought the Spanish conquerors.

== Gallery ==
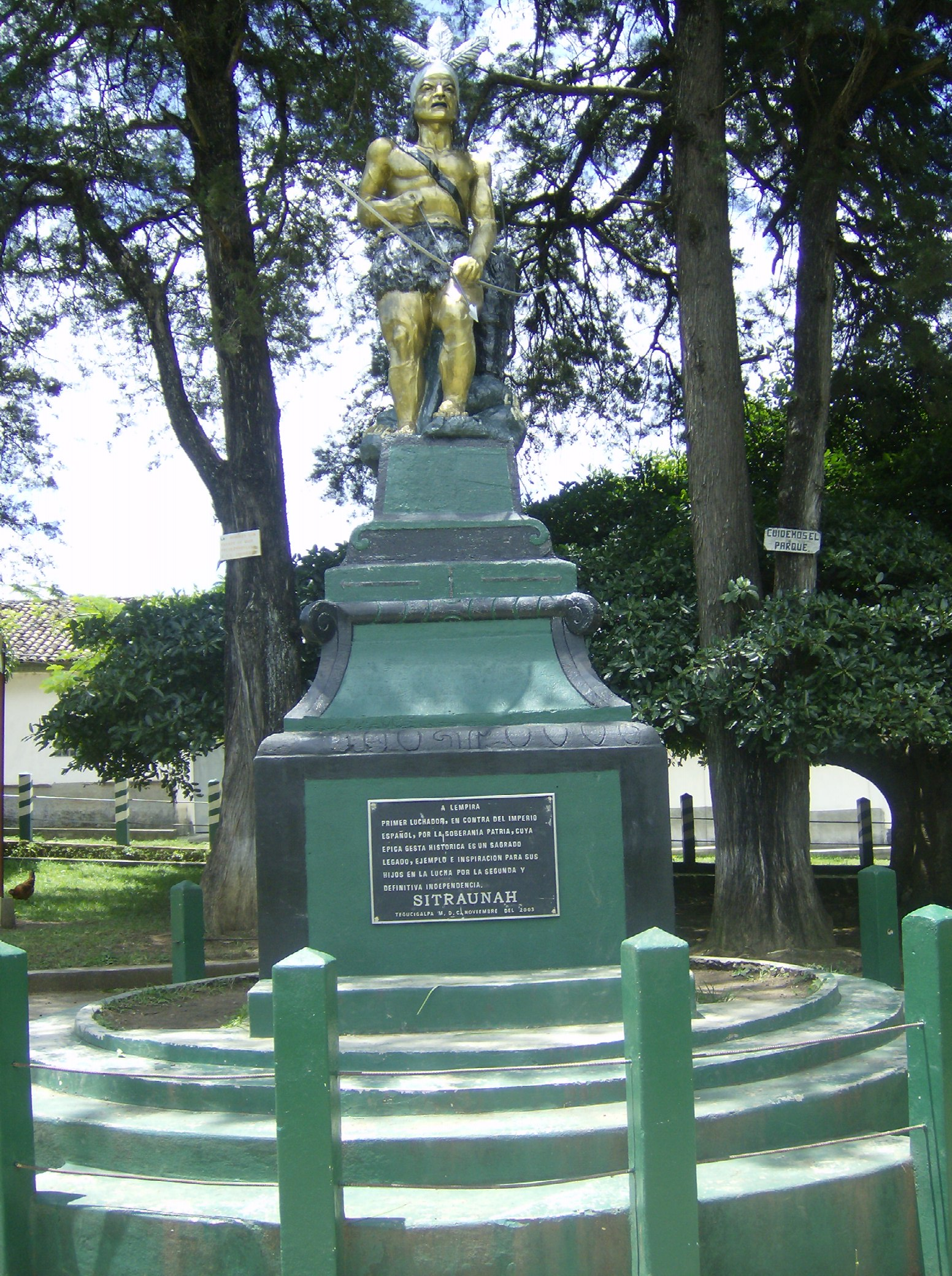
A statue honouring "Chief Lempira"

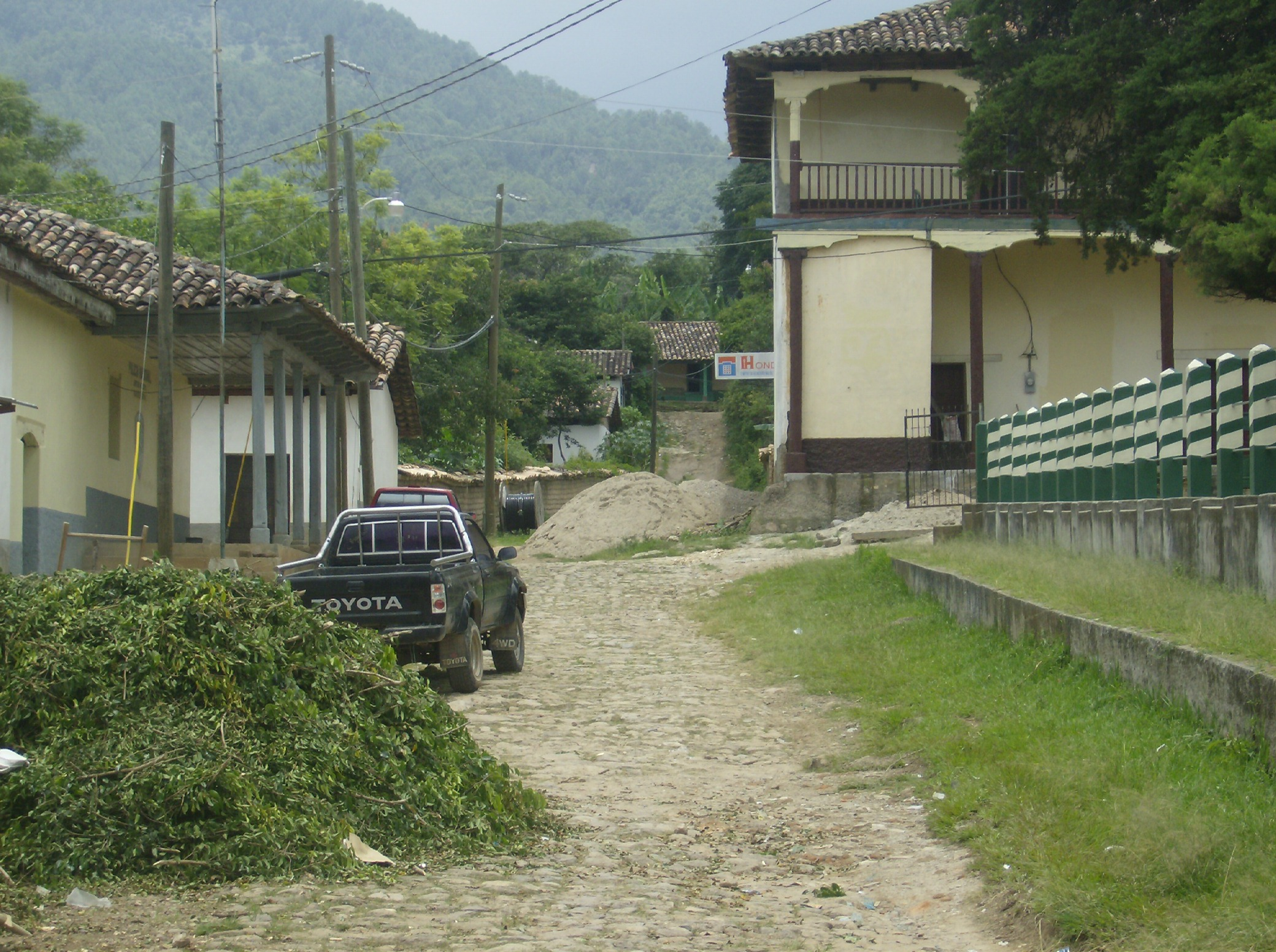
The Streets of Erandique

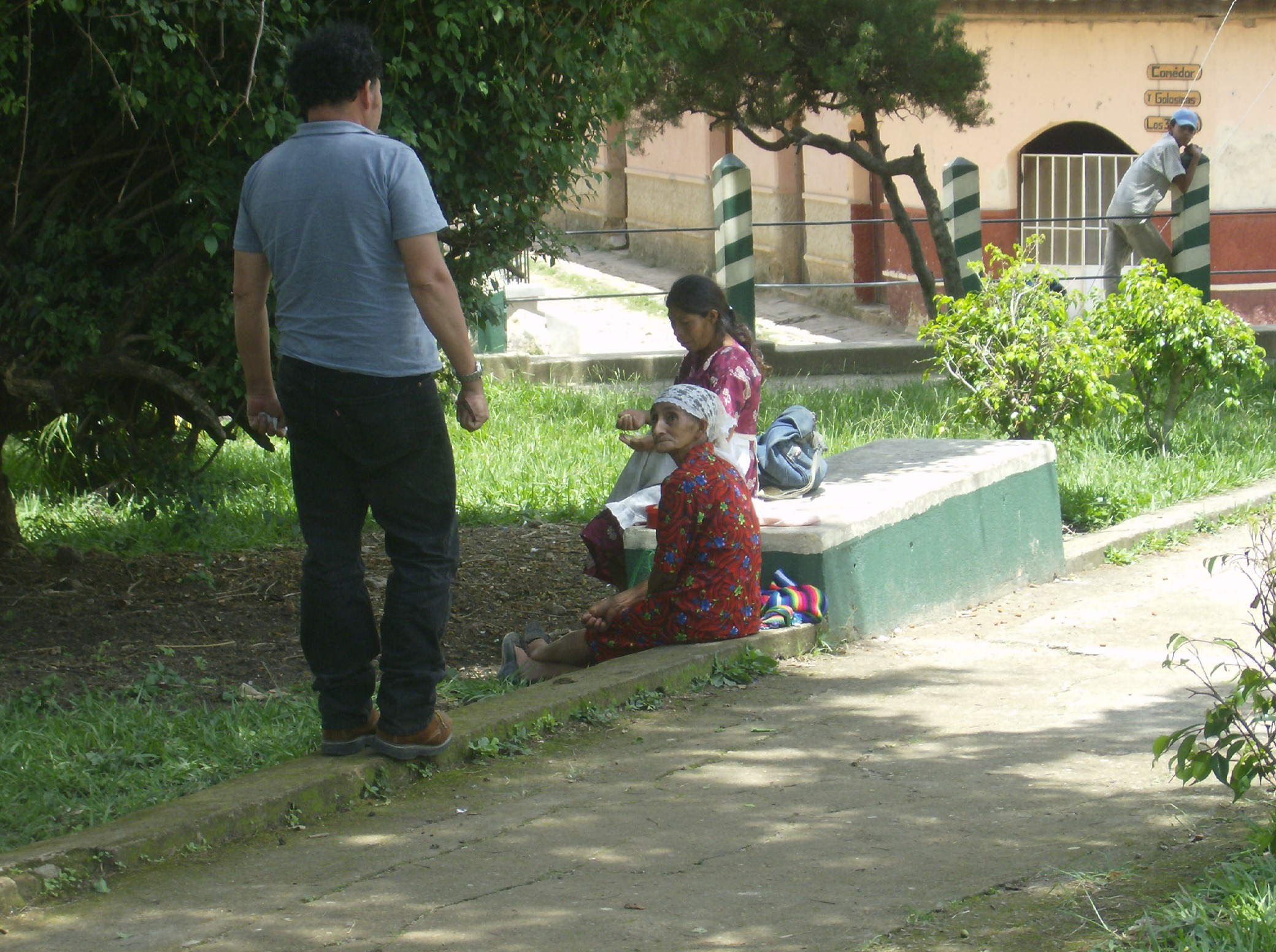
Descendants of Native Lencas in Erandique

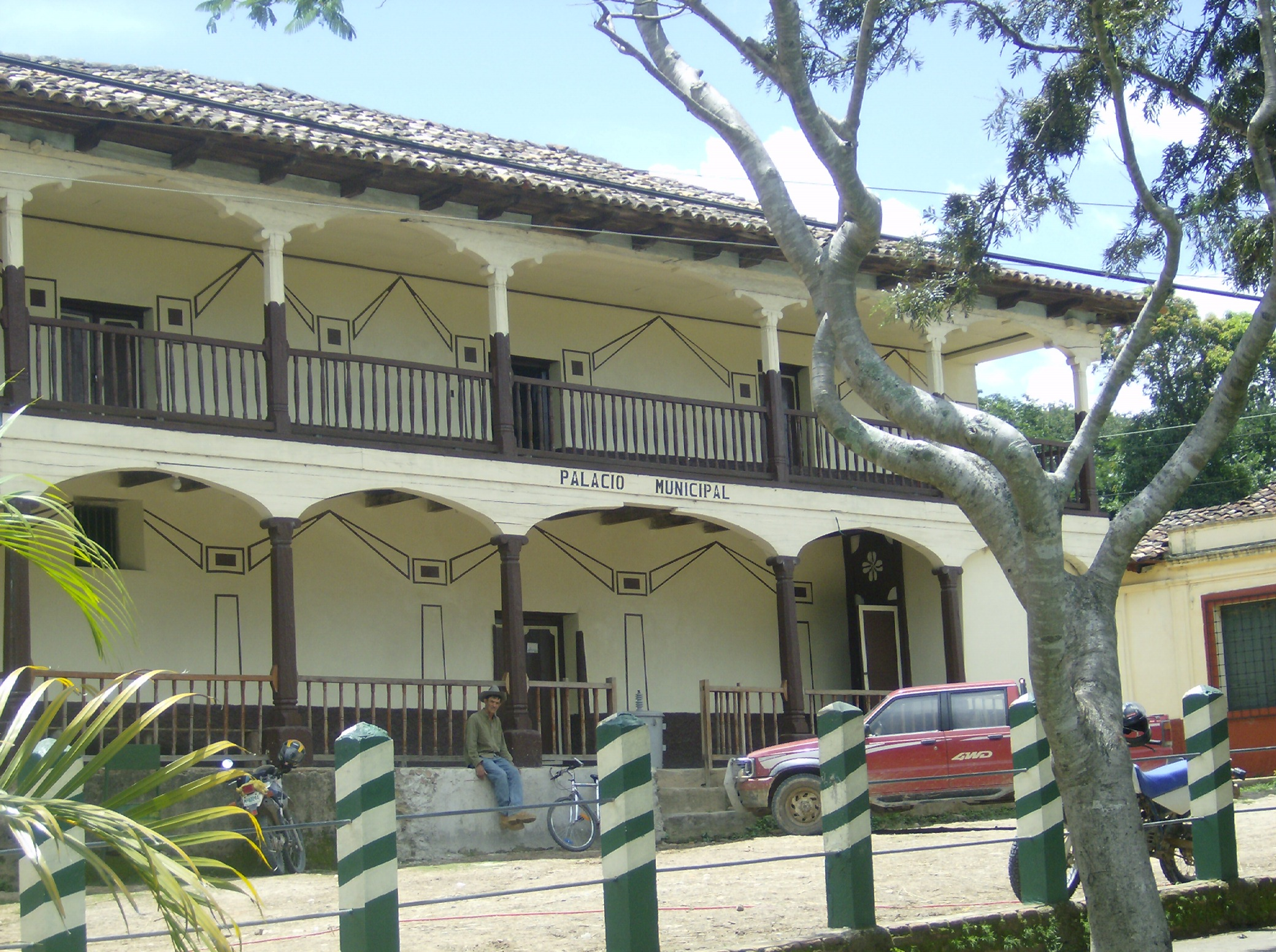
Mayor's Office in Erandique

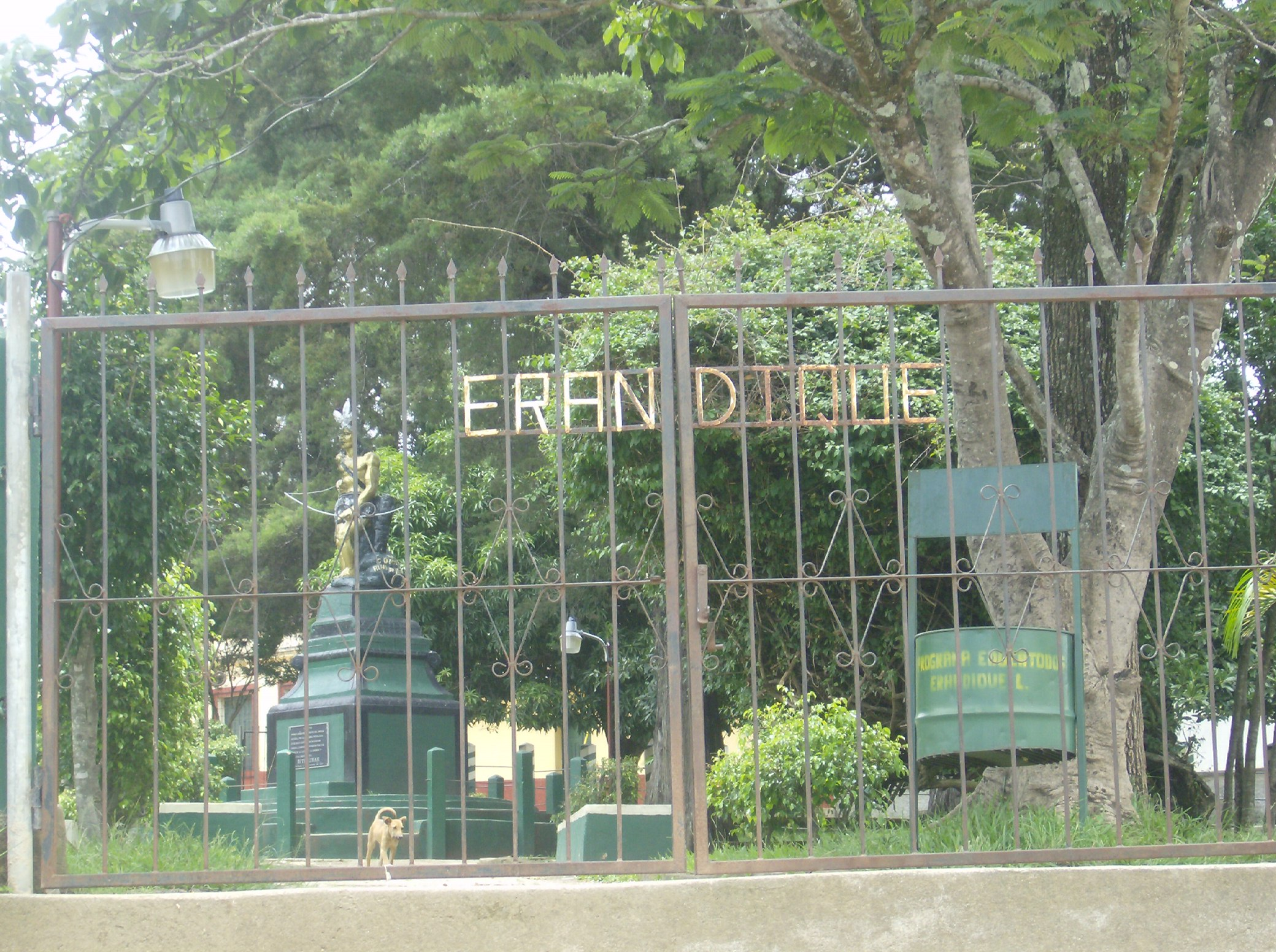
Central Park entrance in Erandique

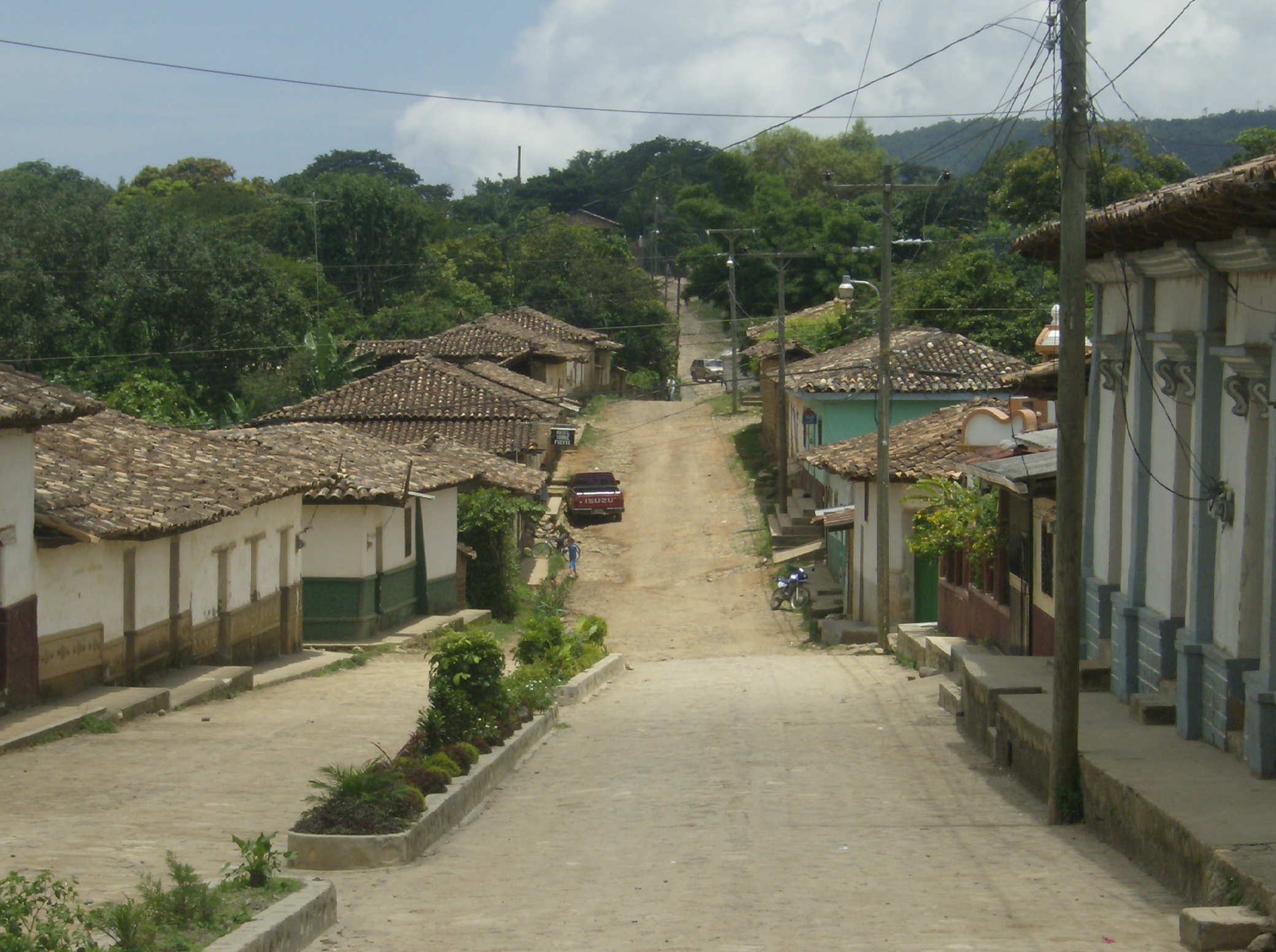
A Street in Erandique

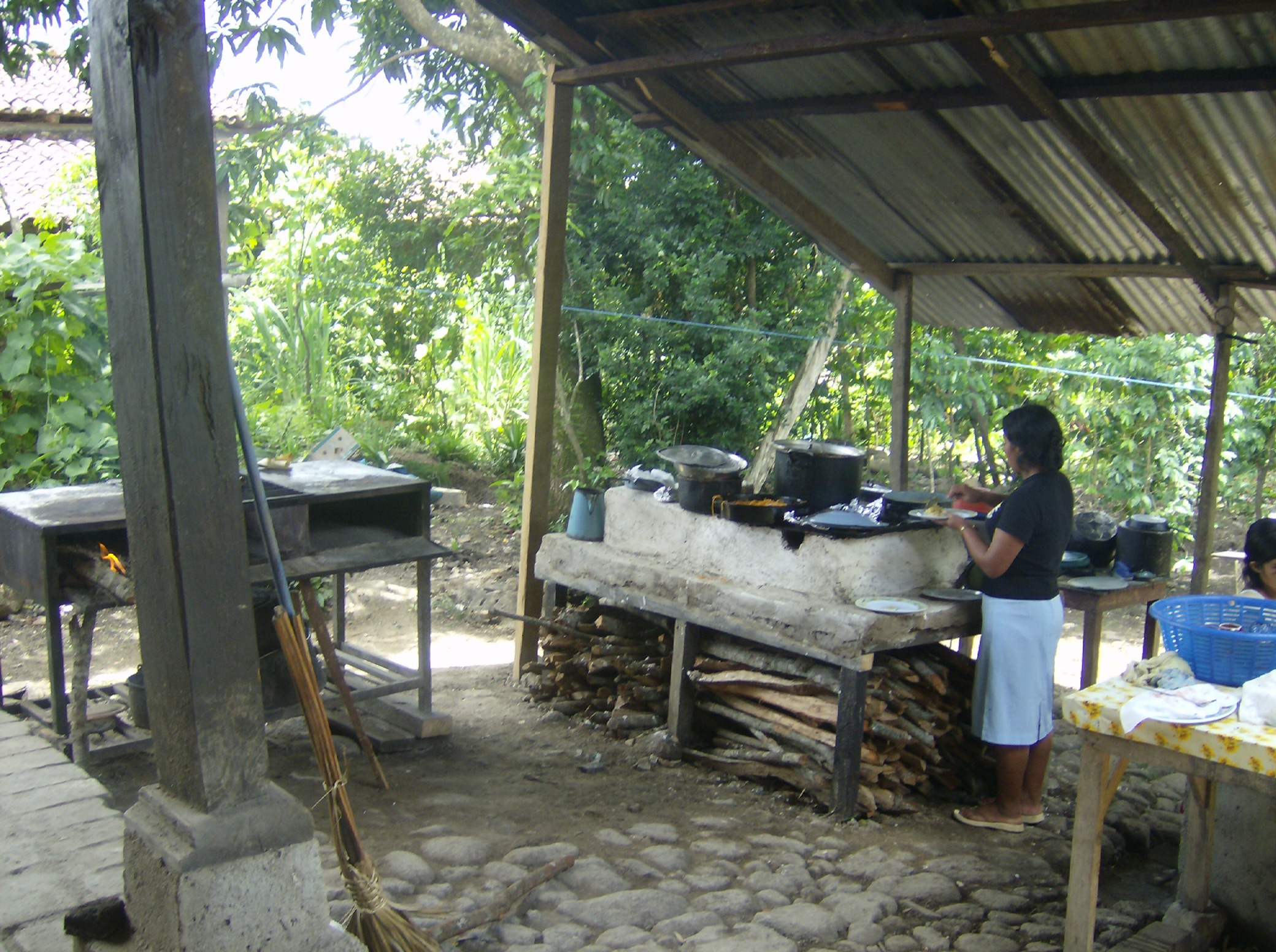
Typical Kitchen in Erandique
