= San Francisco, Lempira =

San Francisco
- Municipality
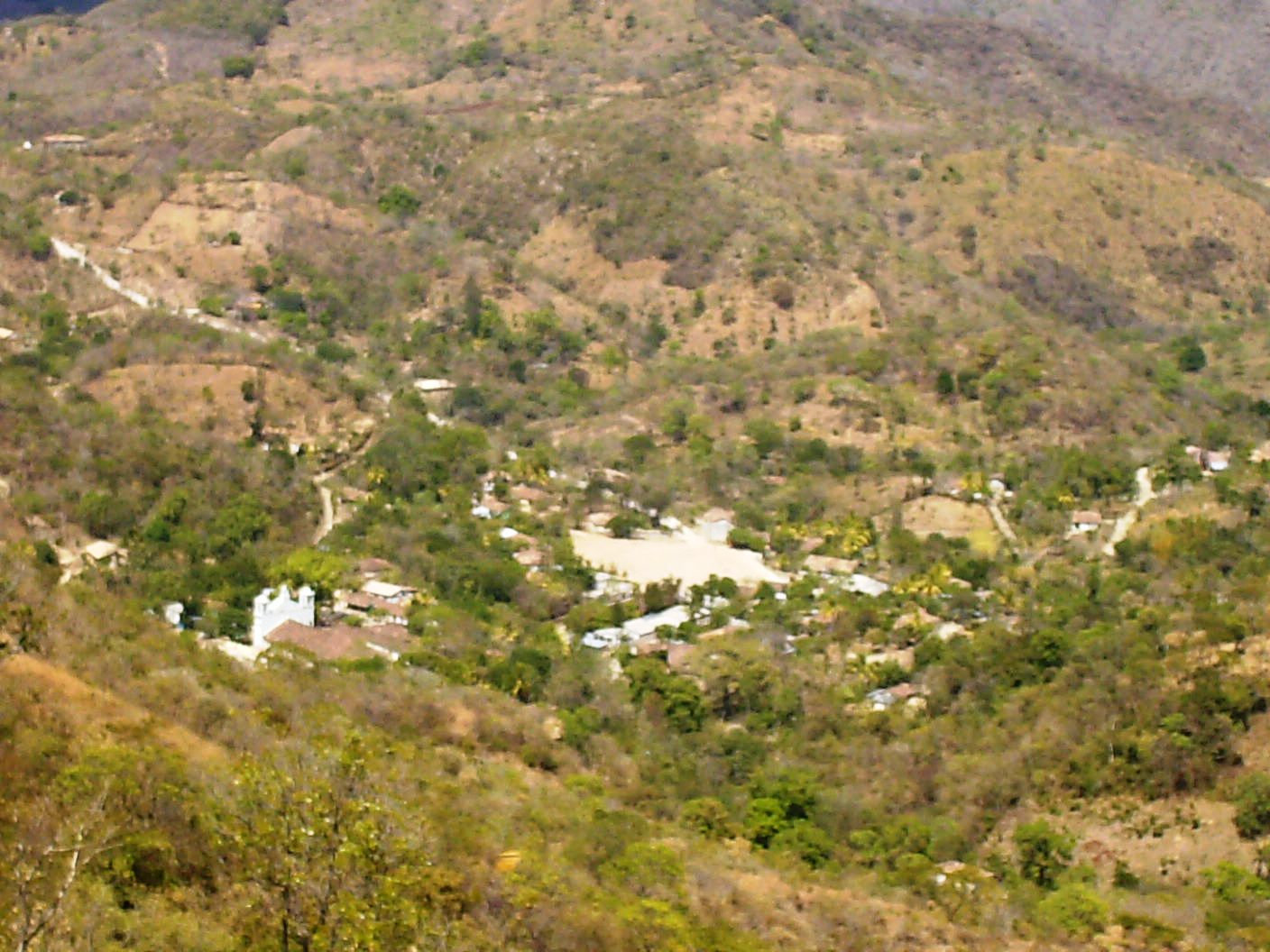
- Panoramic View of San Francisco

- Location in Honduras
- Coordinates: 14°7′N 88°22′W
- Country: Honduras
- Department: Lempira
- Founded: 1837

Area
  - Total: 133 km^{2} (51 sq mi)

Population
  - Total: 9,146
  - Density: 68.8/km^{2} (178/sq mi)
- 2015

San Francisco is a municipality in the Honduran department of Lempira.

It is one of the furthest municipalities of the Lempira department in Honduras.

== History ==
The lands for this municipality were given away by the King of Spain, on 30 October 1692, composed of 2 titles, "Santa Maria Magdalena" and "San Lucas". In the census of 1791 it appears as part of "Curato de Cerquin". It was founded in 1837 for the initiative of Captain Jeronimo Acosta. The church was built in 1856, a historical relic left by the Spanish colonist. But as it can be seen in the photo in this article, the date on the church is 1737. Something worth verifying. In the national division of 1896, it was one of the municipalities of Erandique district.

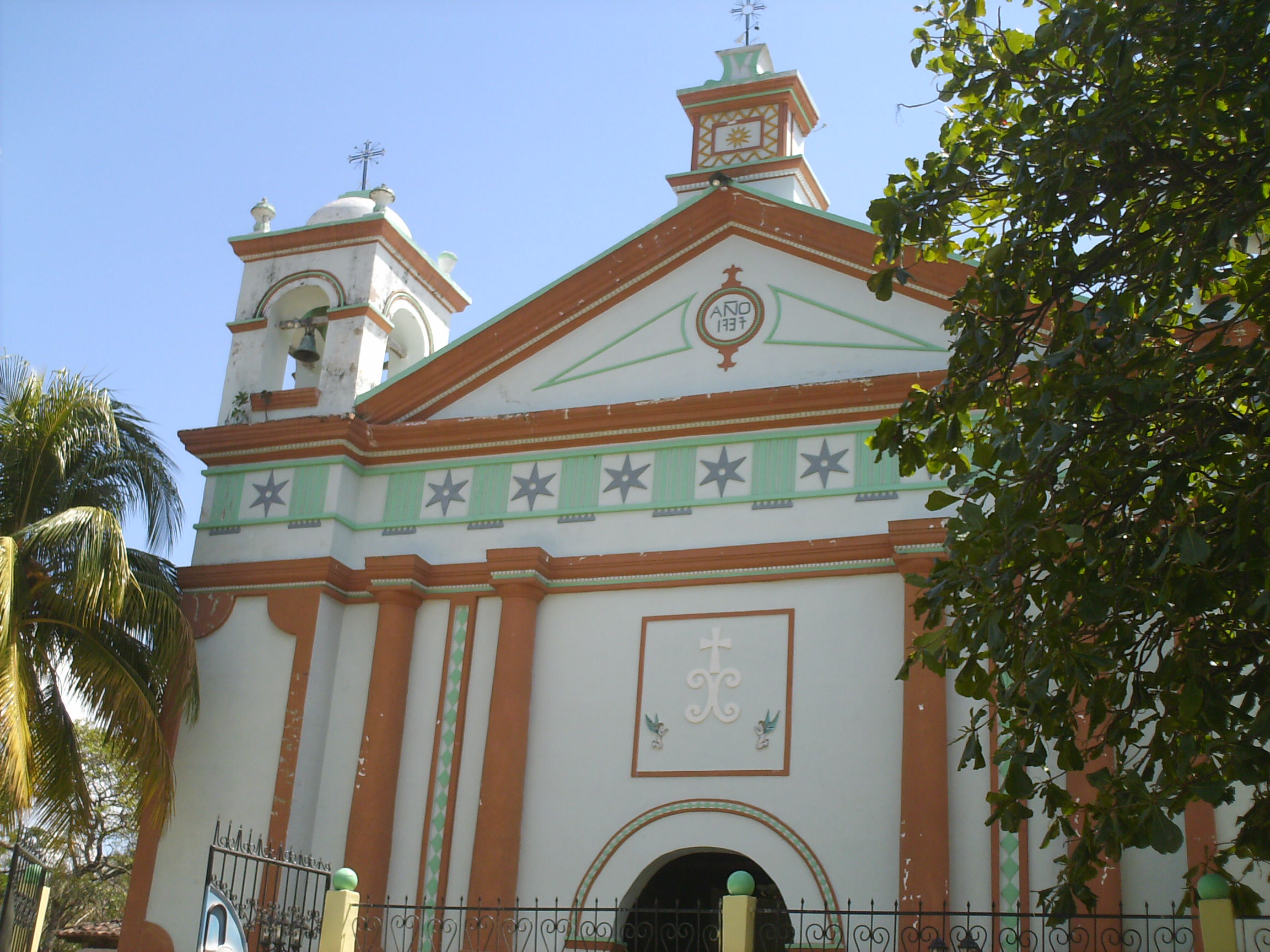
The Ancient Colonial Church

== Geography ==
The municipality capital is located at the toe of "Gelpoa" hill. To get to this capital it is necessary to go up and down mountains and hills, mostly going down, while doing this, the elevation from sea level decreases, this is why the vegetation is typical of dry sub tropical forests. The weather is warm most of the year. In some uninhabited places there are pine forests.

== Boundaries ==
Its boundaries are:

- North : Erandique municipalities.
- South : Intibuca department.
- East : Intibuca municipality.
- West : Erandique and Piraera municipalities.
- Area: 133 km²

== Resources ==
The main products of this municipality are corn and beans. There are very few areas suitable for coffee plantations. The water for human consumption is obtained for excavated wells and some small streams nearby. Cattle and milk products are for local consumption. As does the rest of the department, it has electricity, mobile communication services and internet access at the mayor's office. Groceries stores are quite plentiful. In some houses, people sell gasoline and diesel fuel.

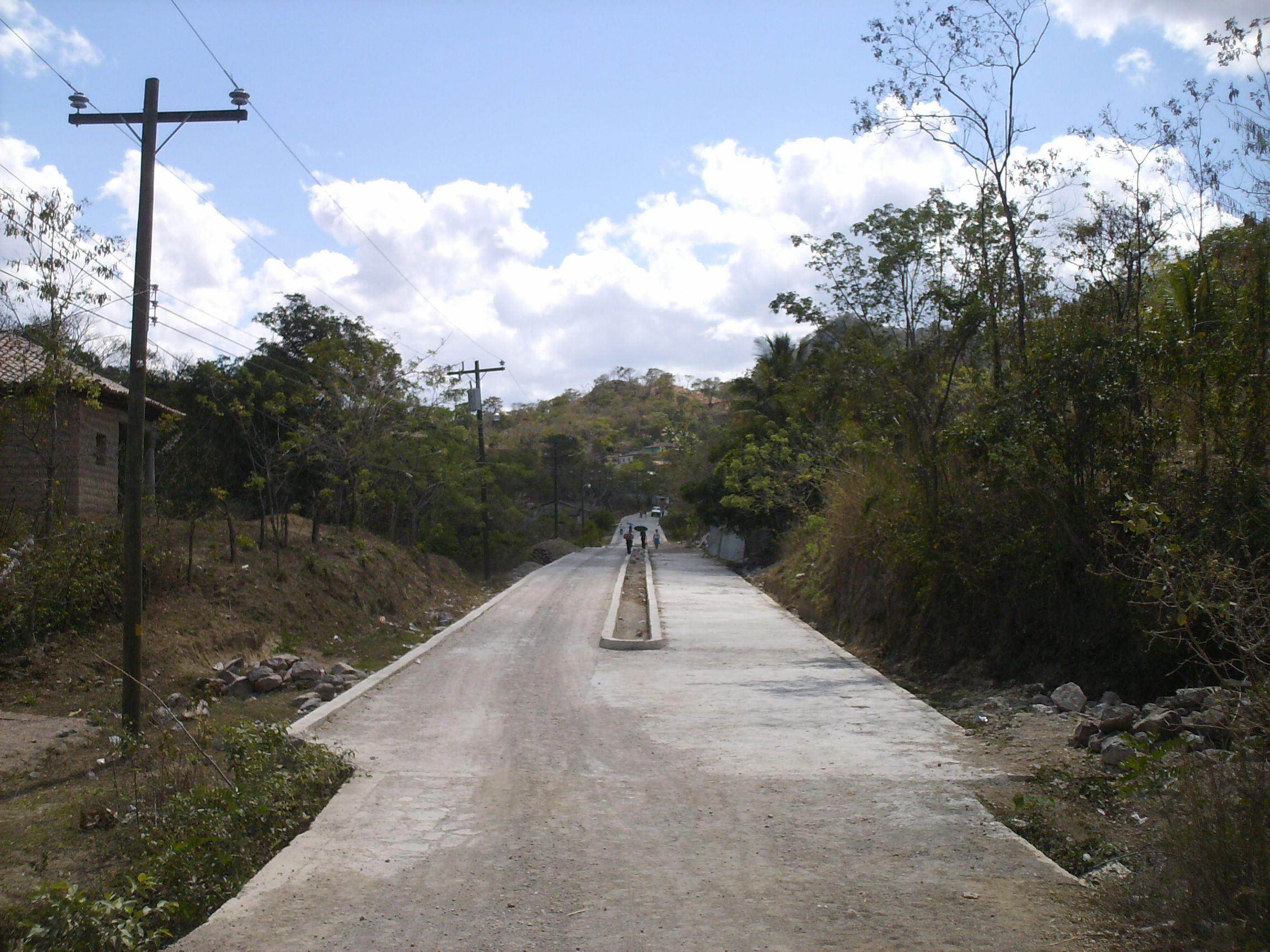
Arriving in town

== Population ==
It is very common to see people who are descendants of the Indians, followed by a few individuals of cross-breed of Spanish and Indians.

- Population:This municipality had in 2001 the amount of 8,086. This was used to elaborate and estimate resulting in 9,143.
- Villages: 7
- Settlements: 86

=== Demographics ===
At the time of the 2013 Honduras census, San Francisco municipality had a population of 9,017. Of these, 91.76% were Indigenous, 7.53% Mestizo, 0.69% Black or Afro-Honduran and 0.02% White.

== Tourism ==
There are two ways of getting to San Francisco: from Gracias via San Juan del Caite, and from La Esperanza via San Miguelito and Dolores.

The primary attraction for visitors in San Francisco is the historic church, and there is also a DVD store in the locality, although the municipality is relatively remote, with the nearest place to fix a flat tire being 30 km away.

- Local Holidays: "Virgen del Carmen" day on 16 July and also "San Francisco de Asis" day, 4 October.
