= Lempira (Lenca ruler) =

Lenca leader of western Honduras (1499–1537)

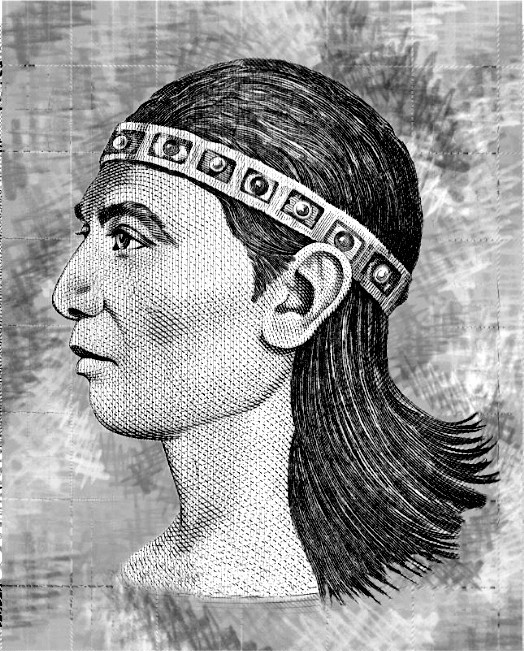
- Drawing of Lempira (Lenca de Honduras)

Chieftain of the Lencas of western Honduras
- Reign: ? – 1537
- Born: 1499
- Died: 1537 (aged 37–38); Corquín, Honduras
- Cause of death: Assassination-decapitation

Lempira was a warrior, chieftain of the Lencas of western Honduras in Central America during the 1530s, when he led resistance to Francisco de Montejo's attempts to conquer and incorporate the region into the province of Honduras. Mentioned as Lempira in documents written during the Spanish conquest, he is regarded by the people as a warrior hero whom the conquistadors feared, since they could not kill him. The Spaniards sent a messenger to tell him they wanted “peace”, but when Lempira showed up for negotiations, they captured him, dismembered his body, and buried him in undisclosed locations so no one could pay him respects.

== Etymology ==
Jorge Lardé y Larín argues that the name Lempira derived from words of the Lenca language: lempa, meaning "lord" as a title of hierarchy, i meaning "of", and era, meaning "hill or mountain". Thus, Lempira, means "lord of the mountain" or "lord of the hill". When the Spaniards arrived in Cerquin, Lempira was fighting against neighboring chiefs. Because of the Spanish threat, he allied with another Lenca subgroup, the Cares, and united the different Lenca tribes. Based at Cerquin hill, he organized resistance against the Spanish troops in 1537, managing to gather an army of almost 30,000 soldiers, from 200 villages. As a result, other groups in the valleys of Comayagua and Olancho also took up arms. Spanish attempts to stop him, led by Francisco de Montejo and Alonso de Cáceres, were unsuccessful until later in 1537.

== History ==
Historical accounts of Lempira differ. Antonio de Herrera y Tordesillas, whose account was published in Historia general de los hechos de los castellanos ... (1626), in Seville, Spain, identifies Lempira as a war captain appointed by Entipica, leader of the Cares, a subgroup of the Lenca. Herrera reports that Lempira, whose name means something like "Lord of the Mountains" in Lenca, commanded over 30,000 soldiers from over 200 different Lenca towns. In 1537, there were widespread indigenous uprisings in Honduras, and the Cares were one group that revolted against Spanish rule.

The Spaniards, on instruction from their Governor, Francisco de Montejo, attacked Lempira at the Peñol de Cerquín, in what is now Lempira Department. According to Herrera, Lempira retreated to a fortified hilltop where he resisted the Spaniards for many months. Finally, the Spaniards lured him out to talk, and a concealed Spanish soldier with an arquebus shot and killed him. On seeing this, Herrera reports, the Lenca surrendered. This is essentially the official version that is taught to Honduran children in school.

In the 1980s, the Honduran historian Mario Felipe Martínez Castillo discovered a very different account of Lempira in a document entitled Méritos y Servicios: Rodrigo Ruiz, Nueva España, written in 1558 in Mexico City. The manuscript is located in the Archivo General de Indias in Seville, Spain. That document, Patronato 69 R.5, tells the story of Rodrigo Ruiz and his service in the conquest of Honduras under Francisco Montejo. It includes his account of killing Lempira. The document is in the form of a series of questions, answered by witnesses to the conquest which Rodrigo Ruiz gave to the Spanish king. It is his effort to gain a pension as payment for his services.

Ruiz wrote the questions, one of which is translated in part as follows:

"...after I cut off his head, they retreated and within 4 days we controlled all of their towns, and they gave obedience to your Majesty as they were obligated to do... and later we founded the town of Gracias a Dios. Ask them to say what they know and if its true that I served in said war, all the time it lasted, serving with myself, my weapons, my horse, at my cost, and was not rewarded for it." – Archivo General de Indias, Méritos y Servicios: Rodrigo Ruiz, Nueva España.

Rodrigo Ruiz described his other service to the Spanish Crown. Witnesses to this 100-page document attested that Ruiz recounted his service accurately and told the truth. Ruiz asked for a pension of 1000 pesos for his service. The modern Honduran Lenca preserved in their oral history Lempira elements that match the Ruiz story, such as Lempira's belief that wearing Spanish clothing made him impervious to Spanish bullets, and that the chief died in combat, not through ambush.

== Legacy and honors ==
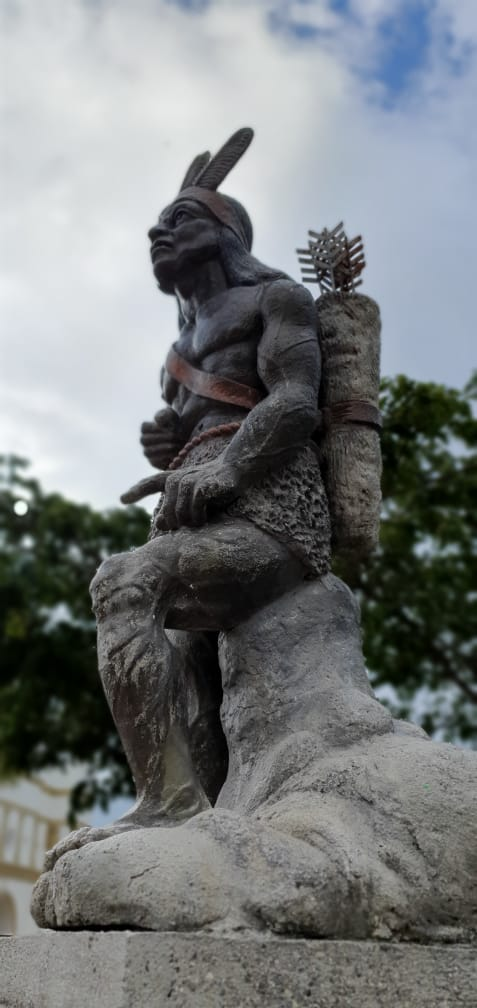
Statue of Lempira in the city of Gracias.

In 1931, Honduras renamed its currency in honor of Lempira. In 1943, Honduras renamed the Gracias Department as the Lempira Department.

== Representation in other media ==
- In 1957, the Honduran writer Ramón Amaya Amador wrote a novel featuring Lempira, entitled El señor de la sierra (The Lord of the Mountains).
- In 2016, the filming of a movie based on Lempira was announced under the title of "El señor de la sierra".
- In 2025, Baltimore Rock Opera Society opened an original rock opera based on Lempira titled "Lempira: Oro y Sangre".

== See also ==
- Urracá
- Conquest of Honduras
- History of Honduras
