= Erandique Airport =

Erandique Airport Gualguire Airport
- IATA: EDQ; ICAO: MHGU

Summary
- Airport type: Public
- Serves: Erandique, Honduras
- Elevation AMSL: 4,199 ft / 1,280 m
- Coordinates: 14°14′10″N 88°26′15″W

Map
- Location of the airport in Honduras

Runways
Direction	Length		Surface
Direction	m	ft	Surface
15/33	680	2,231	Grass
- Sources: GCM Google Maps SkyVector

Erandique Airport (IATA: EDQ, ICAO: MHGU) is an airstrip serving the town of Erandique in Lempira Department, Honduras.

The runway is off the V-787 road, 3 kilometres (1.9 mi) east of town. It has a downslope to the south. There is distant rising terrain west through northeast.

The Soto Cano VORTAC (Ident: ESC) is located 48.3 nautical miles (89.5 km) east-northeast of Erandique Airport. The Ilopango VOR-DME (Ident: YSV) is located 51.1 nautical miles (94.6 km) southwest of the airstrip.

== See also ==
- Transport in Honduras
- List of airports in Honduras
