= Alonso de Cáceres =

Spanish conquistador

- Born: Alonso de Cáceres y Retes late-15th century Alcántara, Cáceres, Crown of Castille
- Died: Unknown
- Occupation: conquistador

Alonso de Cáceres y Retes (Alcántara, late fifteenth century - ?) was a Spanish conquistador and governor-captain of Santa Marta, who traveled extensively throughout the Americas from Mexico, south through Central America, and as far as Peru. He was one of the most active soldiers in the 16th-century Spanish colonization of the Americas.

== Biography ==
Alonso de Cáceres, the son of Gregorio and Maria Cáceres Retes, was born in the village of Alcántara in the late 15th century. He received military training and participated in military campaigns in Europe. As of 1530, he was acting as a captain under the command of Governor Pedro de Heredia in southern Panama and northern Colombia. He participated in the founding of the Colombian city of Cartagena de Indias and subsequently was involved in campaigns on the Isthmus of Panama and on the Colombian frontier.

=== Colombia and Panama ===
During the conquering expedition of Pedro de Heredia from Cartagena to the interior of Cenú territories, (Note: The Pancenú and Fincenú were indigenous tribes who buried their dead with large quantities of gold.) Cáceres was sent to forage after food shortages emerged in Cartagena. Cáceres's soldiers were near starvation, and ate large quantities of guama fruit, which caused them to become constipated. This type of foraging took place regularly as the area of Cartagena had very few plantation areas and many soldiers died of hunger.

On October 21, 1534, de Heredia forces under Cáceres seized Acla and took prisoner Julian Gutiérre and his wife Isabel, who spoke both Spanish and the language of the local indigenous population in Urabá, and she served as an interpreter for the expedition.

=== Central America ===
In 1536 Cáceres left the Colombian-Panamanian region and moved into Central America under the command of Governor Francisco de Montejo, responsible for the conquest of Yucatan. In this exploratory mission, Cáceres was sent to the Honduran city of Gracias a Dios, which then served as a base for his explorations. People of the city distrusted him and would not allow him to stay, but the captain was not discouraged and continued his mission. On 8 December 1537 he founded the city of Comayagua, which became the first Spanish capital of the territory that is now Honduras.

Lencas led by Lempira attacked and burned the settlement, escaping afterwards to the Cerro Coyocutena mountain. Lempira brought with him about 30,000 natives from all the tribes of the region, and prepared a large-scale revolt against the Spaniards. Cáceres sent two men to him under the pretense of peace negotiations, but they instead treacherously assassinated Lempira, whose death dissolved the alliance among the indigenous tribes. The rebellion was unsuccessful, and the Honduran territory was secured for the Spanish crown.

=== Peru ===
Cáceres reached Jauja, Peru in 1539. An expedition, together with a Captain Alonso Mercadillo, into the territory of the Chupacho was planned, but the risk was evaluated to be too great and the expedition was not mounted. Cáceres continued on missions in 1544, conquering the city of Cuzco. Learning that Gonzalo Pizarro was about to arrive, he fled and began living in Arequipa.

There he joined Jerónimo de la Serna and both moved to Quilca. They planned to seize the two ships that Pizarro had purchased to transport artillery and use them to support their operations. Cáceres and Serna bribed sailors, weighed anchor and brought the ships to the port of Callao, making them available to viceroy Blasco Núñez Vela. The viceroy was imprisoned by the court. Pizarro occupied Lima and was recognized as Governor and Captain-General of Peru. He ordered Cáceres killed along with others who had taken his field-marshal Francisco de Carvajal prisoner. Some lost their lives at the hands of Pizarro, but Cáceres was granted a pardon by Pizarro through the mediation of some respectable persons.

When Pedro de la Gasca arrived in Peru, many Spanish soldiers who had earlier sided with Gonzalo chose to support La Gasca, including Hernan Bravo de Laguna, who was subsequently arrested. Gonzalo sent him to Carvajal to be hanged, but had to pardon him once his sister Inés Bravo, wife of Nicolás de Rivera, asked for his life. For this reason, Cáceres, who took much interest in the life of Bravo, kissed Gonzalo on the cheek saying loudly: "O prince of the world! Damn all those who deny thee, even until death." But once they left, they rejoined the royal forces.

== Official activities ==
Cáceres was assigned posts in the administrations of the governments of cities where he lived. In Santa Marta in Colombia, he served as alderman. In the Yucatan he served as lieutenant for Francisco de Montejo and acted for him as office of head chief when he was called away. In Arequipa (Peru) he was appointed mayor and presumably ended his days there.

== Descendants ==
In Lima he married María de Solier y Valenzuela, with whom he had a son. His son, Diego de Cáceres, married María Mauricia de Ulloa y Angulo in 1581. They had a son, named José de Cáceres y Ulloa. Petronila de Cáceres and Solier, who first married Sebastián de Casalla in 1568 and Rodrigo de Esquivel y Zúñiga, whose offspring brought him the marquisate of San Lorenzo del Valleumbroso.

== Bibliography ==
- Aguado, Friar Pedro de: Historia de la Provincia de Santa Marta y Nuevo Reino de Granada.
- Navarro de Castillo, Vicente: La epopeya de la raza extremeña en Indias, Mérida (1978), ISBN 84-400-5359-2.
- Lopez de Gómara, Francisco: Historia General de las Indias. Madrid, Orbis (1985).
- Mira Caballos, Esteban: Y la justicia actuó: el procesamiento del conquistador Alonso de Cáceres, XXXIV Coloquios Históricos de Extremadura. Trujillo (2007), pp. 425–440.
