= Salvadoran literature =

Salvadoran writers

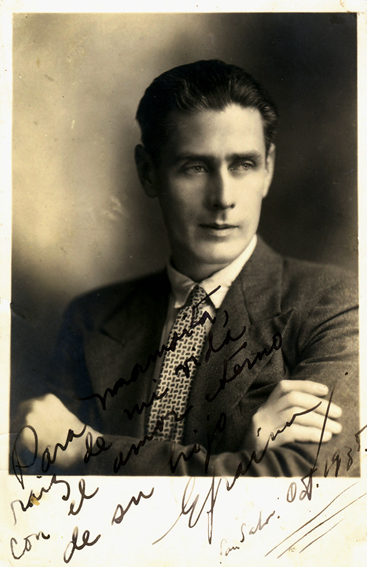
Salarrué

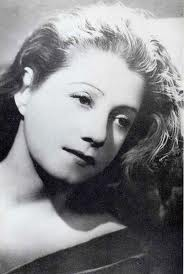
Consuelo de Saint-Exupéry

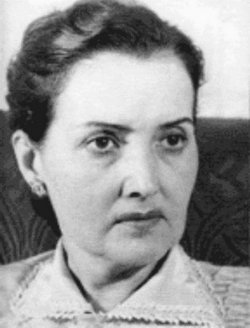
Claudia Lars

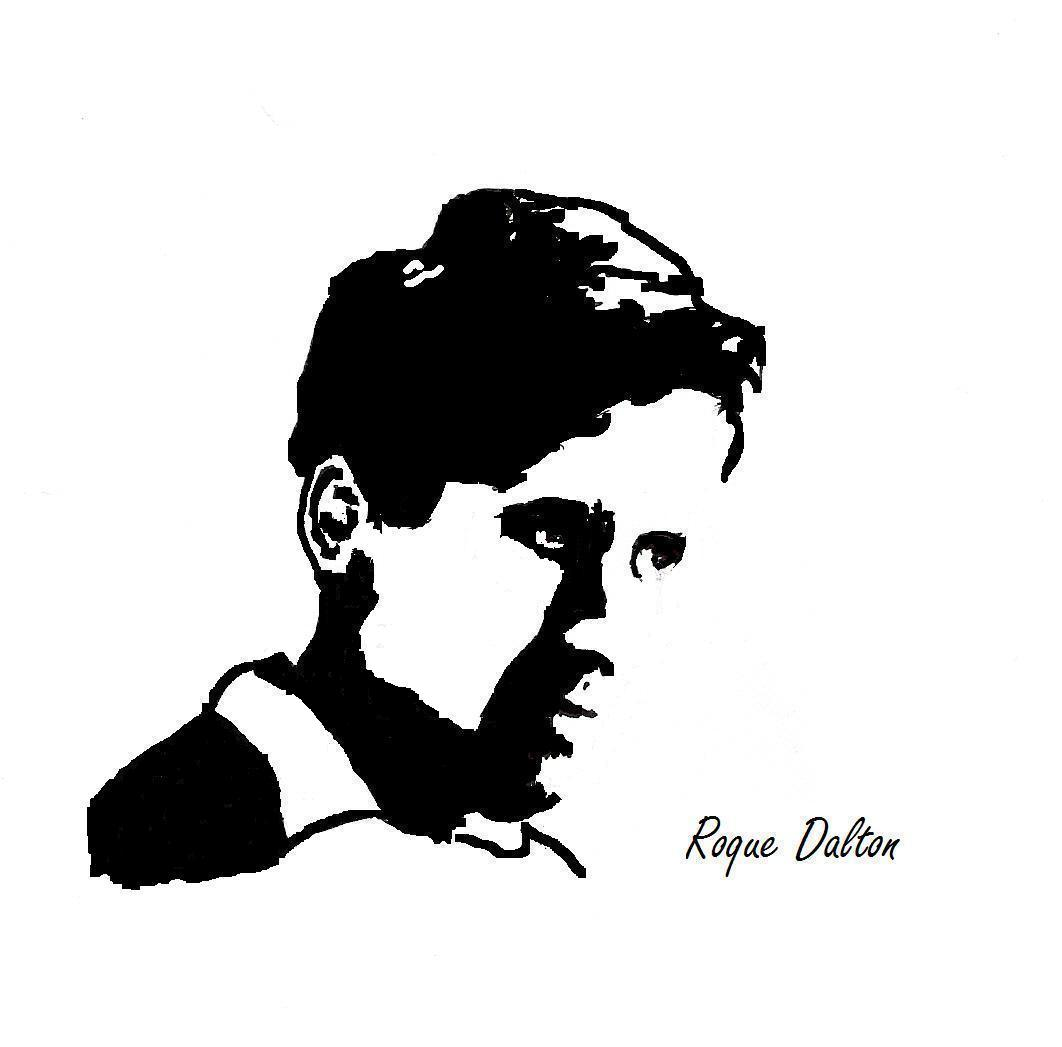
Roque Dalton

Salvadoran literature is primary literature written in El Salvador. Salvadoran literature is primary written in Spanish and in other languages like English (mainly written by its diaspora).

== Origins of Salvadorean literature ==
=== Colonial literature ===
During the colonial period, literature flourished in the Iberian metropolis; in the colonies of the Americas there was also a remarkable cultivation of the arts, especially architecture, fine arts, and music. There were significant barriers, however, to a comparable emergence in literature. Religious authorities zealously controlled the lives of recent converts to Christianity, insisting that literary expression be in the service of faith and under their careful scrutiny. Despite this, an important secular literary tradition emerged in the viceregal courts of Mexico and Lima. This literature tended to imitate the metropolitan canons, though occasionally nourished an original and memorable voice like that of Mexican poet Juana Inés de la Cruz.

The Salvadorean territory was far from the centers of culture. Literature may have enjoyed popularity among small circles of educated criollos, but there is little evidence of this. What evidence does exist confirms that literary development was sporadic, ephemeral, and even accidental. An example of such development is the house of Andalusian Juan de Mestanza, who was the mayor of Sonsonate between 1585 and 1589, mentioned in Miguel de Cervantes' "Viaje del Parnaso". In the colonial era there was considerable theatrical activity, a central aspect of popular entertainment in the settlements' festivities. During these events religious or comic plays were presented.

=== Religious literature ===
Catholic faith and rites were the unifying factor in a heterogeneous and highly stratified society. Some literary expression was linked to religiously themed dramatic productions, staged during celebrations in villages and neighborhoods. On the other hand, some literature was addressed to a smaller, more elite readership. In the latter group are pious works, hagiographies portraying the lives of saints, and theological treatises, written by clergy born in the county, but generally published in Europe.

Among this last category is Juan Antonio Arias, a Jesuit born in Santa Ana. He wrote treatises including Misteriosa sombra de las primeras luces del divino Osiris and Jesús recién nacido. Father Bartolomé Cañas, also a Jesuit, sought asylum in Italy after being expelled from his order in the Spanish territories; in Bologna he wrote a major apologetic dissertation. Diego José Fuente, a Francisco born in San Salvador, published a variety of religious works in Spain. Juan Díaz, a native of Sonsonate, authored the biography Vida y virtudes del venerable fray Andrés del Valle.

=== Secular literature ===
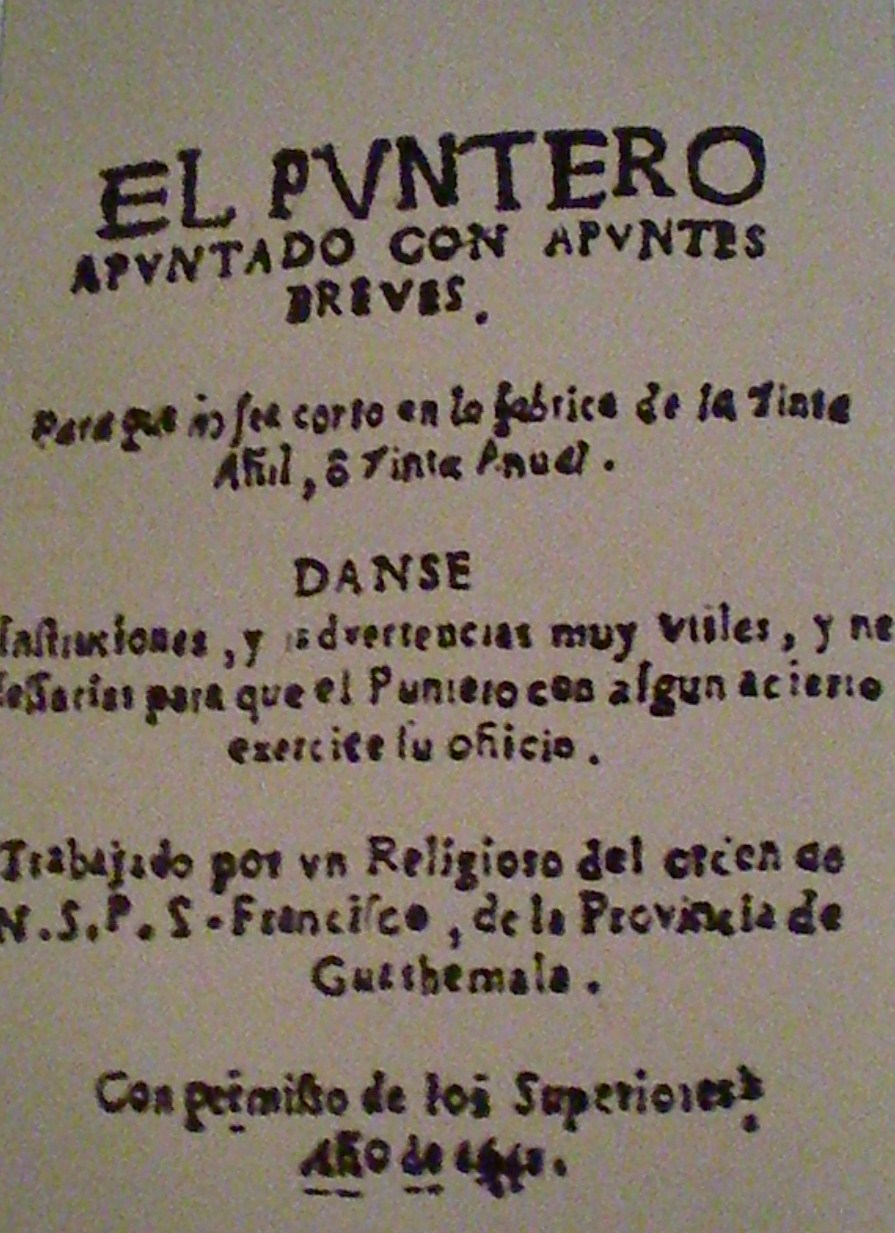
The title page of El puntero apuntado con apuntes breves

A major non-religious work was a manual for the manufacture of indigo El puntero apuntado con apuntes breves, by Juan de Dios del Cid, who made a rudimentary printing press to publish his work, which may have been the first press in the territory of El Salvador. The document is printed with the date 1641, but Salvadorean literary critic Luis Gallegos Valdés asserts that this date was a typographical error, and some historical references place it in the next century. Another major work was the Carta de Relación, written by the conquistador Pedro de Alvarado for practical reasons; it narrates major episodes in the conquest of the Americas.

=== Literature during the era of independence ===
By the last decades of Spanish rule there already existed considerable secular cultural activity in Central America. It was centered on the University of San Carlos in Guatemala. There, educated criollos gathered to discuss and exchange ideas of the Enlightenment. This encouraged the emergence of a literature more political than aesthetic, manifested principally in oratory and argumentative prose, both polemic and doctrinal, in which authors demonstrated their ingenuity and use of classical rhetoric.

One major figure of this era was Father Manuel Aguilar (1750–1819), whose famous homily proclaimed the right of insurrection of oppressed peoples, provoking scandal and censorship. The priest José Simeón Cañas (1767–1838) is known for his 1823 speech in the Constituent Assembly, in which he demanded the emancipation of slaves. Presbyterian Isidro Menéndez (1795–1858), the author of much of the era's legislation, was also renowned for his oratory.

The aesthetic of Salvadorean literature of this era did not have a role comparable to that of eloquent speech or journalistic writing. Literature was used only occasionally, such as anonymous verses offering satirical comment on contemporary politics, or other poetry celebrating the good name and deeds of important figures. Examples of the latter category include the prose work Tragedia de Morazán (Tragedy of Morazán) (1894) by Francisco Díaz (1812–1845) and the ode Al ciudadano José Cecilio del Valle (To the Citizen José Cecilio del Valle (1827) by Miguel Álvarez Castro (1795–1856).

The weakness of the state, the lack of urban life, and the consequently non-existent cultural infrastructure limited authors' ability to support themselves. Under these conditions, artists were dependent on private patrons and oriented toward serving their tastes and increasing their social prestige.

== Era of liberalism and cultural modernization ==
The birth of a distinctly Salvadoran literature must be placed in historical context. It was with the rise of Rafael Zaldívar in 1876 that liberals defeated their conservative rivals. As they founded a national state from the ground up, literature became increasingly relevant.

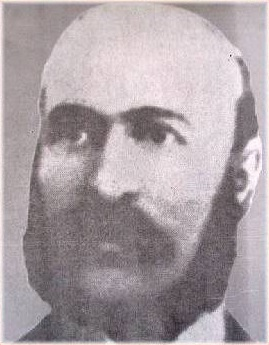
David Joaquín Guzmán.

=== The liberal project ===
Proponents of the national project hoped that the development of an economy oriented toward agricultural exports, with coffee as the main product, would progress from barbarism (for liberals synonymous with warlordism, Catholicism, and an uneducated public) to civilization (synonymous with political and social achievements like those of advanced European nations).

After many reforms state and its structure, the country was losing its indigenous cultural identity and began to forge a new identity. An enlightened elite was necessary to assist in this process. Thus, the University of El Salvador and the National Library were founded in 1841 and 1870, respectively. In the late 19th century, the National Library had strengthened considerably; it sponsored the publication of works by local authors, in addition to its own magazine. The semi-official Salvadoran Academy of Language was also nominally founded in 1876, though it did not begin to operate until 1914.

In parallel, an independent elite culture emerged. This activity coalesced around scientific and literary societies, most of which had a brief existence. The society La Juventud, founded in 1878, was an exception to this rule. Despite its small membership, it was a very active forum with respect to the latest scientific and artistic trends. Thus took shape an intellectual elite composed largely of the economic elite. Many of the important literary works of this era were scientific. In the natural sciences, doctor and anthropologist David Joaquín Guzmán, author of la Oración a la Bandera Salvadoreña, was a major figure. Santiago I. Barberena was a major figure in geography and history.

Despite this scientific emphasis, the elite had special respect for aesthetic culture, particularly literature. For the liberal elites, literacy and familiarity with the latest trends in European literature (particularly French literature) were unmistakable marks of spiritual superiority. This peculiar attitude toward the aesthetic contributed to the increased social standing of poets and made literature an important element in the legitimization of the state.

=== Modernismo and literary modernization ===
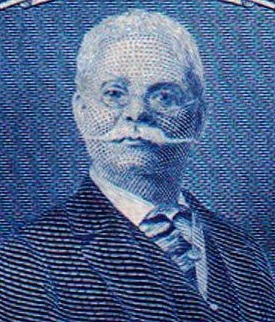
Juan José Cañas.

The history of modernismo in El Salvador dates to the controversy over the influence of romanticism that took place in the pages of La Juventud. La Juventud denounced the teaching of Fernando Velarde, a Spaniard who lived in the country during the 1870s, influencing young writers with his dreamy and grandiloquent poetry. His teaching produced poetic work influenced by Spanish romanticism. Among these authors were Juan José Cañas (1826–1918) (lyricist of the national anthem), Rafael Cabrera, Dolores Arias, Antonio Guevara Valdés, and Isaac Ruiz Araujo.

While still teenagers, Rubén Darío (1867–1916)—the famous Nicaraguan poet who then lived in San Salvador— and Francisco Gavidia (1863–1955) attacked Velarde's poetry and drew attention instead to the model of Parnassian symbolist poetry from France. Both studied this poetry with rigor and enthusiasm, trying to unravel its intricate constructive mechanisms and translating them into the Spanish language.

Francisco Gavidia took on the founding of a national literature, a preoccupation that is seen throughout his voluminous writings. His writings are the greatest expression of the liberal spirit in the arts. His vision of the Salvadoran literature advocates for the dominance of Western traditions, while not forgetting the need to preserve and to know native traditions.

Other important authors of the period included Vicente Acosta, Juan José Bernal, Calixto Velado, and Víctor Jerez. Some of them participated in the publication The Literary Fortnight, which played an important role in disseminating the turn-of-the-century aesthetic.

== 20th-century literature ==
During the first decades of the 20th century modernismo continued to dominate Salvadorean literature, though new trends began to be seen. The model of liberal cultural modernization appeared to be consolidated under the short-lived government of Manuel Enrique Araujo, who enjoyed support among intellectuals and seemed committed to a policy encouraging science and the arts. Araujo tried to give a stronger institutional base to the model of scientific literary societies with the founding of the Ateneo de El Salvador (association for the study of national history and writing), but this impulse was cut short by his assassination in 1913.

During the Meléndez-Quiñones dynasty that followed, any progress was overshadowed by the return of evils of past times: nepotism, intolerance and clientelism, especially within the intellectual class.

=== Costumbrismo and introspection ===
The Salvadoran literary scene, which had previously embodied a cosmopolitan aesthetic spirit, was poorly equipped to deal with the country's new political reality. As a result, different manners of portraying local customs and everyday life arose, whether satirical or analytic, and writers began to turn their attention to matters previously neglected in literary expression. One major writer in the costumbrismo tradition was General José María Peralta Lagos (1873–1944), Minister of War under Manuel Enrique Araujo and, under the nom de plume T.P. Mechín, a very popular author of polemics and social satire. His narrative works and his drama Candidato humorously depict typical aspects of provincial life. Other important costumbristas included Francisco Herrera Velado and Alberto Rivas Bonilla.

The popularity of writing about everyday life went hand in hand with the growing importance of journalism. The rise of journalism meant more independent writing, and consequently more writing critical of the state of affairs in the county. Journalists also engaged in persuasive political writing. Alberto Masferrer (1868–1932), for example, wrote many political essays, which—though more political than artistic in nature—contributed to the changing literary trends of the era.

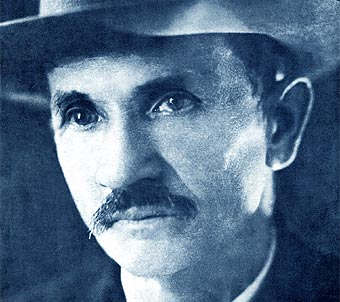
Arturo Ambrogi.

In this era, aesthetic concerns were generally subordinate to ideological concerns. This was not the case, however, for Arturo Ambrogi (1875–1936), who was the most read, most prestigious writer in El Salvador. He published many literary portraits and chronicles, culminating in the 1917 El libro del trópico. Ambrosi's originality lay in his thematic shift toward traditions native to El Salvador and his synthesis of literary language and vernacular dialect.

The representation of popular speech was often present in costumbrista works, providing local color and typifying ignorant characters. Ambrogi's approach was novel: he showed the literary possibilities of popular speech, suggesting the merit of vernacular culture. The lyric work of poet Alfredo Espino (1900–1928), popular themes and language were similarly transformed into poetic material. While his poetry may seem anachronistic and puerile to modern readers, his work was thus important in Salvadoran literary history. The first decades of the 20th century were important because they marked the change from Europeanized, elite literary culture to a more inclusive national literary culture, which made reference to the native to define itself.

=== Antimodernism ===
In the late 1920s and early 1930s, Salvadorean society experienced various social and political shocks that disrupted the fragile literary society. On the economic front, the crisis on Wall Street resulted in a drastic drop in coffee prices. President Pío Romero Bosque had begun a process to return to institutional legality, calling the first free elections in Salvadorean history. Engineer Arturo Araujo was elected on a reform platform inspired by the ideas of Alberto Masferrer. The economic crisis and resulting political conflict led to six decades of military authoritarianism that dramatically suppressed the proliferation of literature.

Writers actively searched for alternatives to Western modernism. Modernists in the mold of Rubén Darío frequently condemned the prosaic nature of the times, yet were dazzled by the opulence and refinement of turn-of-the-century Europe. While modernists condemned the vulgarity of the new rich, they were not inclined to denounce the art that wealth produced. Among new literary generations this attitude changed; they began to reject even the foundations of modernism.

From his post as consul in Antwerp, Alberto Masferrer observed this crisis; the writings of Alberto Guerra Trigueros (1898–1950) also reflected the trend towards otherness as a model of progress. This search for alternatives led many to embrace Eastern mysticism, Amerindian cultures, and primitivism that saw the antithesis of disenchanted modernity in traditional ways of life.

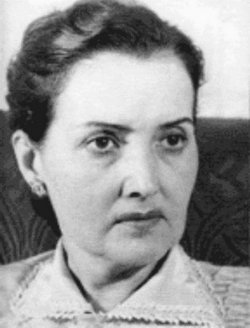
Claudia Lars.

Theosophy and other sui generis adaptations of eastern religions gained popularity. These ideas were particularly attractive to a group of writers including Alberto Guerra Trigeros, Salarrué (1899–1975), Claudia Lars (1899–1974), Serafín Quiteño, Raúl Contreras, Miguel Ángel Espino, Quino Caso, Juan Felipe Toruño. These writers found their aesthetic creed in an art defined as a radical antagonist of social modernity.

Guerra Trigueros was the artist with the most solid theoretical training of this group and the most familiar with the intellectual trends and aesthetics in Europe. Apart from being a respected author, he also played an important role as a diffuser of new aesthetic ideas. In his essays, he advocated for a radical redefinition of the language and themes in poetry, which had been dominated by the modernist aesthetic. He promoted free verse and poetry with a colloquial tone, redeeming everyday language in what he called "vulgar" poetry. Though lyricism of a classical mold was more popular among his contemporaries (who also were distancing themselves from modernism), Guerra Trigueros's became more visible in the following generations (for example, in the writing of Pedro Geoffroy Rivas, Oswaldo Escobar Velado, and Roque Dalton).

=== Populism and authoritarianism ===
In the early 1930s, Salvadorean fiction was centered on the work of Salarrué, which is as diverse as it is voluminous. While uneven, his work formed the continuation and culmination of the synthesis of cultivated literary language with the popular voice begun by Ambrogi. His Cuentos de barro (1933), which may be considered the most popular Salvadorean book, uses popular speech and elevates the primitivism of country life to the status of national utopia. He often employed themes of fantasy and of Eastern religion.

Though the members of this generation of writers did not always have direct links with the military dictatorship installed in 1931, their conception of national culture as a negation of an enlightened ideal helped legitimate the new order. The idealization of the traditional peasant and his solitary link with nature permitted the association of authoritarianism with populism, which was essential to the emerging discourse of the military dictatorship.

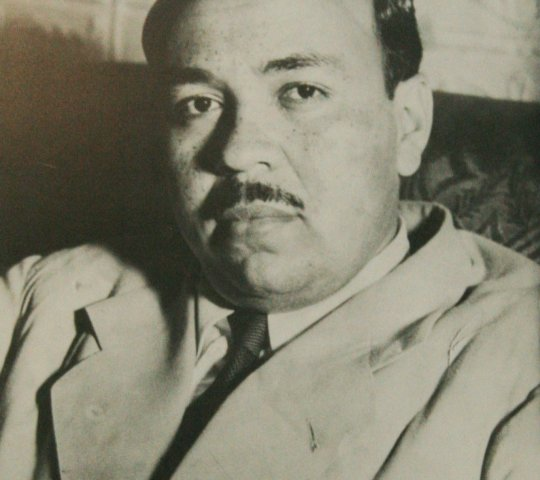
Luis Gallegos Valdés.

=== The 1944 generation and anti-authoritarianism ===
The 1940s saw the emergence of a group of writers including Pedro Geoffroy Rivas (1908–1979), Hugo Lindo (1917–1985), José María Méndez (b. 1916), Matilde Elena López (b. 1922), Joaquín Hernández Callejas (1915–2000), Julio Fausto Fernández, Oswaldo Escobar Velado, Luis Gallegos Valdés, Antonio Gamero, Ricardo Trigueros de León, and Pedro Quiteno (1898–1962). Pedro Geoffroy Rivas produced lyrical literature marked by avant-gardism and played an important role in the rescue of indigenous traditions and popular language. The poetry of Oswaldo Escobar Velado was characterized by existentialism and the denouncing of social injustices. José María Méndez and Hugo Lindo explored new frontiers in fiction.

Many writings of this generation played an active role in the democratic movement that ended the dictatorship of Hernández Martínez. However, some writers actively collaborated with the regime of Óscar Osorio.

As part of a modernization project, Osoria promoted one of the most ambitious cultural policies in the history of El Salvador. For example, through the Editorial Department of the Ministry of Culture (later Directorate of Publications, Ministry of Education), under the energetic leadership of the writer Ricardo Trigueros de León, developed editorial work of great range, which was a crucial step in laying the foundations of the canon of literature in El Salvador.

In parallel, the culture industry rose and was universalized, a process that would affect the development of literature. By 1950 the media were displacing the fine arts and traditional culture in the popular imagination, and literature was relegated to the margins. This weakness made art an easy hostage for the military regime, increasingly delegitimized by corruption and the lack of political freedom.

== Literature from the civil war to the present ==
In this convulsive context came a literature that formed the legacy of the writers of the “Compromised Generation." In addition, more literature came that advocated the popular struggles for liberation; these struggles largely defined the chorus of Salvadoran artistic literature that existed from the 1950 to the 1980.

As people began to settle down in Central American land, they began to also marry within Indian populations. This led to the emerging of the mestizos which are people mixed of European and American-Indian parents. This also explains their mixed dialects. What made literature so risky throughout its development in Latin countries is the risk of getting into trouble with authorities or those who tried to shut citizens down because they did not care for ones opinion especially opposition. Over time, people began to write on deeper and more sensitive subjects as the government developed and adjusted to advanced freedom compared to ancient history. Source: https://www.travelationary.com/el-salvador-arts-and-literature/

In 1984 the poet Salvador Juárez directed the literary workshop which was a university extension in the Universidad de El Salvador. Some young adults became a part of this literary workshop project. In 1985 the young adults would reinforce their practice of literature in the literary workshop of Xibalbá. Some of its members were: Javier Alas, Otoniel Guevara, Jorge Vargas Méndez, Nimia Romero, David Morales, José Antonio Domínguez, Edgar Alfaro Chaverri, Antonio Casquín; including the poets that died in combat, Amílcar Colocho and Arquímides Cruz. This group would be one of the most solid literary groups of the last five years of 1980. They fought in the popular armed movement at the same time that they carried out an intense work of literary production (some of them won awards in various contests of the time, judged by recognized writers such as Matilde Elena López, Rafael Mendoza and Luis Melgar Brizuela. One example of the contests they entered being the Certamen Reforma 89 which was promoted by the Lutheran Church). This group of writers practiced mainly poetry, which was marked by their participation in the popular organization of the Farabundo Martí National Liberation Front (FMLN) during the civil war in El Salvador. Some articles or poetic samples can be found in press releases of those years. Their work explored the themes of liberation, love and the future.

Some members of Xibalbá were seriously injured, marched into exile, or died during clashes with security forces. Some of its members remained close to political or military activity; others withdrew from that environment. Reportedly they constitute the last chapter of the (literatura de compromiso) commitment literature, an extension of the "extreme aesthetics" according to Huezo Mixco. Commitment literature? was a way of making literature to give an answer and an option at a critical moment. These "extreme aesthetics" were carved by the anti-Fascist generation and the Compromised Generation.

The group dissolved after 1992. Although the war had taken its toll on the dead and exiles, the legacy of Xibalbá and previous generations have created a great responsibility for other young people and groups of writers who will emerge in the next two decades.

The literary lethargy that existed during the military dictatorship was ending when the civil war approached in the 1980s. Círculo Literario Xibalbá was a circle of writers that appeared during the armed conflict in El Salvador. It was funded by the Universidad de El Salvador in the 1980s. The group constitutes one of the most prominent groups in the literary history of El Salvador and one of the most affected during the civil war. During the war several members were assassinated for their publications and today many members work in very different fields.

Notable members include Amilcar Colocho, Manuel Barrera, Otoniel Guevara, Luis Alvarenga, Silvia Elena Regalado, Antonio Casquín, Dagoberto Segovia, Jorge Vargas Méndez, Álvaro Darío Lara, Eva Ortíz, Arquímides Cruz, Ernesto Deras.

== See also ==
- List of Salvadoran writers
- Culture of El Salvador
- LGBT literature in El Salvador
