= Afro-Salvadorans =

Ethnic group in El Salvador

Afrosalvadoreños (Spanish)
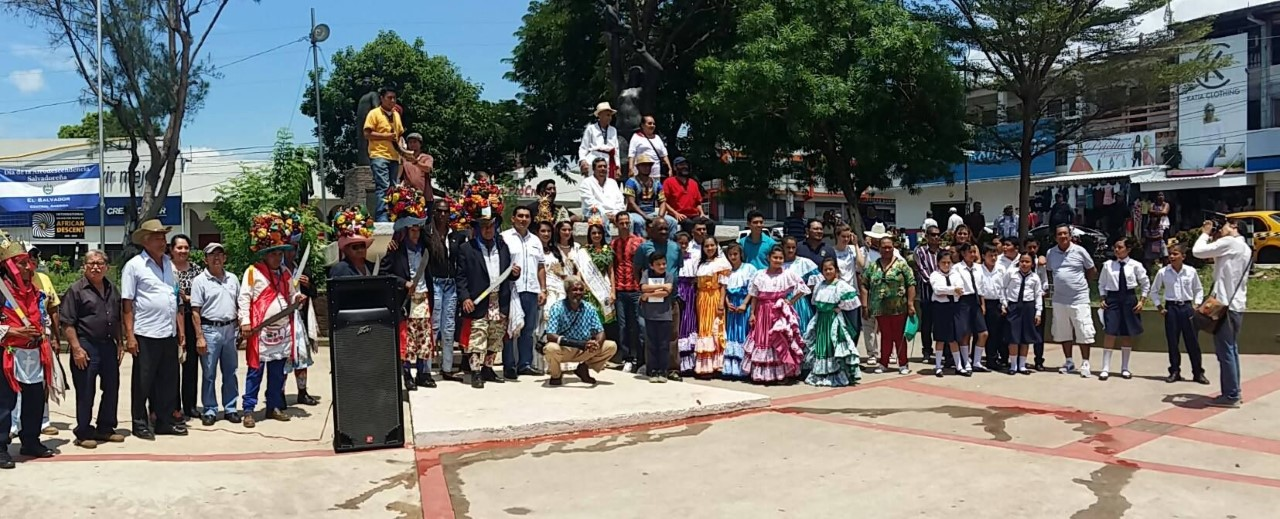
- Afro-Salvadorans, Mestizos and Indigenous Salvadorans gathered in Zacatecoluca during Dia de la Afrodecendencia Salvadoreña.

Total population
- Sub-Saharan ancestry predominates 7,441 (0.13% self-identified in 2007 census)

Regions with significant populations
- Sonsonate, Ahuachapán, San Miguel, and La Unión

Languages
- Majority: Spanish; Minority: English (usually as an L2)

Religion
- Roman Catholicism • Protestantism • Afro-American religions

Related ethnic groups
- Afro-Latin Americans, Afro-Caribbean, Garifuna

Afro-Salvadorans (Spanish: Afrosalvadoreños), also known as Black Salvadorans (Spanish: Salvadoreños negros) are Salvadorans of total or predominantly Sub-Saharan African ancestry. They are the descendants of slaves brought to El Salvador via the Trans-atlantic slave trade during the colonial Spanish era.

== History ==
=== Origins and distribution ===
Most slaves began to be imported around the 1540s, following a royal decree officially freeing the indigenous peoples in 1548. Slaves came from the city of Santiago, in Guatemala, and were then distributed throughout Central America. Thus, many of the African people who worked in rural Salvadoran areas came from West Africa and usually, as in Guatemala's case, from Senegambia.

=== Forced migrations ===
A description of the plantations & settlements near San Miguel by 1685.

African enslaved people arrived in the country by forced migration. The first enslaved person arrived in El Salvador to work in the haciendas, in cocoa and indigo mills, and in the gold mines. In San Salvador and San Miguel, many people enslaved African people, some of whom were sent to wash gold in Honduran rivers, which was a major industry in the sixteenth century. In 1545, there was a noted sum of about 1,500 African enslaved people seeking auriferous sands in Honduras.

The intense richness of cocoa from Izalco made this one of the first regions to have significant numbers of African enslaved people due to the high demand for free labor. Thus arose several enclaves of African enslaved people in places such as the shores of Lake Coatepeque and in the town of La Trinidad in Sonsonate, on the banks of the river Cenzúnat. The people who were enslaved and served as foremen on the plantations were usually highly trusted by the people who enslaved them and were meant to intimidate the indigenous populations into submission.

In the province of San Salvador, two thousand African peoples rose between November and December 1624, reaching militant troops from Comayagua (Honduras), to address the danger to the province. It was a contingent of indigenous and Ladino soldiers from Zacatecoluca and Apastepeque who captured the slaves, who were found in the banks of the Lempa River, in El Marquesado and the hill of the same name, as well as downstream near the mouth. All captured slaves were executed in San Salvador in 1625. This discouraged the importation of more African slaves.

However, when cocoa was sold out, slaves were used in the cultivation of indigo, as several royal decrees had prohibited the use of Indian labor in the mills and the landowners needed labor. Consequently, there was considerable demand for African labor in the indigo mills, which was provided by the slave ships arriving on the north coast, usually transported by the Portuguese, who had a supplier's license and a permit for introduction. Despite the later fall of the indigo industry, there was still a high demand for African labor due to investments in building Salvadoran cities. There were many slaves shipped into El Salvador.

Thus came the next wave of African slaves who worked in the construction industry, particularly to begin the construction of the railway in the nineteenth century, and another wave possibly came in the early twentieth century. These migrations resulted in places with black populations like San Vicente (in Verapaz), colonial San Miguel (in San Alejo), Zacatecoluca, Chinameca, and Ahuachapan in which the Africans worked in the indigo industry. Similarly, descendants of African slaves, who were active participants in the revolt of 1932, were found in Atiquizaya. Also, Nejapa in San Salvador, was initially populated by mulattoes.

=== Afro-Salvadoran militias ===
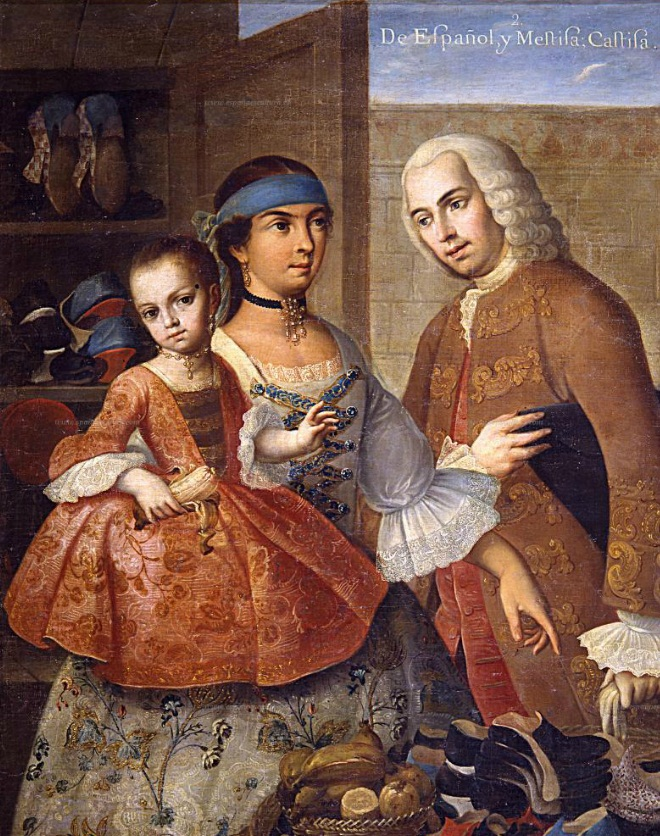
After independence, the oligarchy and the government of El Salvador began to make the Afro-descendant community invisible, they began a process of racial whitening.

In 1611, when the slave mulattoes helped defeat the Maroons of Tutale, Guatemala and El Salvador did not allow people of African descent to officially participate in militia companies. However, Africans and their descendants, even enslaved, had still fought with Spanish forces from time to time since the Conquest. Nevertheless, in the 1630s, a wave of attacks against Central America by enemy privateers and pirates persuaded the Audiencia to enlist free people of African descent in regular militia companies, although segregated. In 1673 there were six Pardo companies in Guatemala and two in El Salvador. Soon there were Afro-militias in places like the Department of Sonsonate and Chiquimula, Guatemala.

After early struggles against the corsairs, the militias requested an exemption from Laborío Tribute, threatening not to serve otherwise. Because of that, several militia companies were temporarily exempted from this tax during the 1690s. The militants claimed this success and soon other requested Exemptions were granted. Then, the rest of the Afro-descendants also expected to be relieved of Laborío tribute, and prepared to face the authorities on the subject, rebelling against them. The most prominent example occurred in 1720 in San Salvador, where there had been a slave rebellion less than a century before. When the rumor that officials were preparing a new census for the Laborío Tribute Collection spread throughout the mulatto neighborhoods, at least 200 people took to the streets, threatening to burn the residence of the mayor. The rioters were persuaded to return home only after they were shown the list, barely containing 40 names. Spanish officials, who did not dare to continue the account, estimated that the actual number of residents in the city who were eligible for inclusion in the census was about 1,000.

=== Increase in the Afro-Salvadoran population ===
Although little is known about Afro-descendants of El Salvador (and Guatemala) working in the agricultural sector, several sources in the last third of the sixteenth century identified Afro-Salvadoran farming communities in the area surrounding the city of Sonsonate. Free people of African descent and slaves also worked on the production of indigo on the Pacific coast of Guatemala, and especially of El Salvador, eventually hosting over 200 indigo mills. People of African descent tended to work in the mills, usually supervising the Xiquilite (indigo) harvest. This process only lasted one to two months a year, making it unprofitable to maintain a permanent workforce where there were only enslaved workers to produce indigo. Some mill owners bought more slaves, some of which were needed to produce indigo, while others were used for other activities, such as tending to livestock.

The Afro-descendants eventually began to mix with the general population, transitioning from a purely African population to the mulatto and zambo populations. African men readily chose Amerindian women, so their children would be free. Laws were later passed banning the miscegenation of the African and Amerindian populations for this reason.

Many mulattoes became landowners and enjoyed privileges by being estate owners, often to the detriment of the natives. Several places were populated with mulatto families as they settled in prosperous neighborhoods, like the neighborhood of Angel in La Trinidad of Sonsonate, and neighborhoods in San Vicente, San Miguel, and San Salvador. They also were integrated into indigenous neighborhoods and villages in estates and royal lands and later became the Ladino peoples.

=== Abolition of slavery and beyond ===
During the Intendencia, when few African people remained enslaved, there were regulations for slave owners, by order of the Crown to the Audiencia Real. For example, the regulations were enacted in San Miguel in September 1804. The cabildo of St. Vincent of Austria and La Trinidad, in Sonsonate, also enacted it. Slavery was banned in 1825, which made El Salvador the third country to abolish slavery in the Americas after Haiti and Chile. Numerous slaves from Belize fled to El Salvador, eventually mixing with the native population.

In the late nineteenth century, the Catholic Church began to classify the population. In 1933, General Hernández Martinez, concerned about the events in Europe and following the example of Adolf Hitler, wrote a law called the Immigration Limitations, prohibiting the entry of Africans, Asians, Arabs, Romani people, and many others into the country. He did urge, however, the immigration of north-central Europeans to whiten the population. These events further strengthened the Salvadoran denial of African roots and the Afro-descendants legally disappeared. However, that law was abolished by the new laws of 1959 and 1986.

== Cultural influence ==
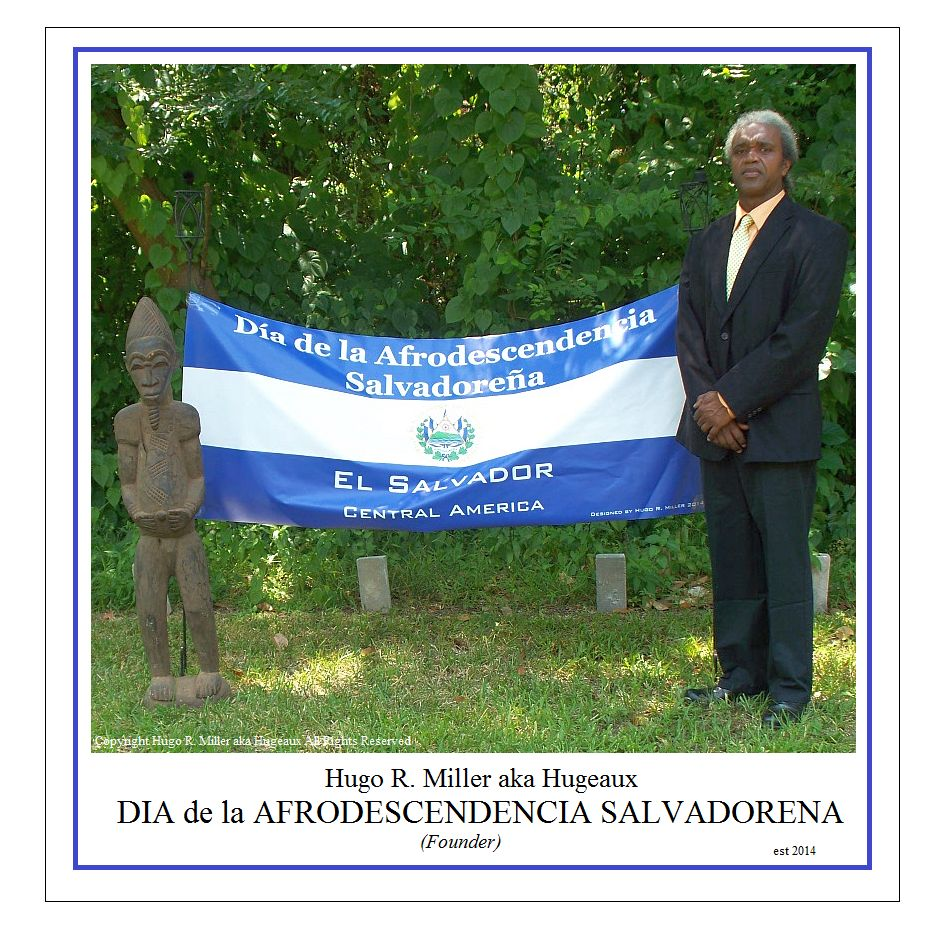
Hugo R. Miller, the founder of Dia de la Afrodescendencia Salvadoreña.

El Salvador has a dance called "Negritos de Cacaopera" (in Spanish: blacks of Cacaopera). In Ereguayquin, in the Department of Usulután, there is the Tabales dance in honor of San Benito de Palermo, the black saint. In Izalco, Sonsonate, there is the Jeu Jeu dance; in Tacuba, Ahuachapán, there is the "baile de la Negra Sebastiana" (in Spanish: Dance of the black Sebastiana), demonstrating through its dancers the arrival of the Spanish with the Tlaxcalans and to El Salvador.

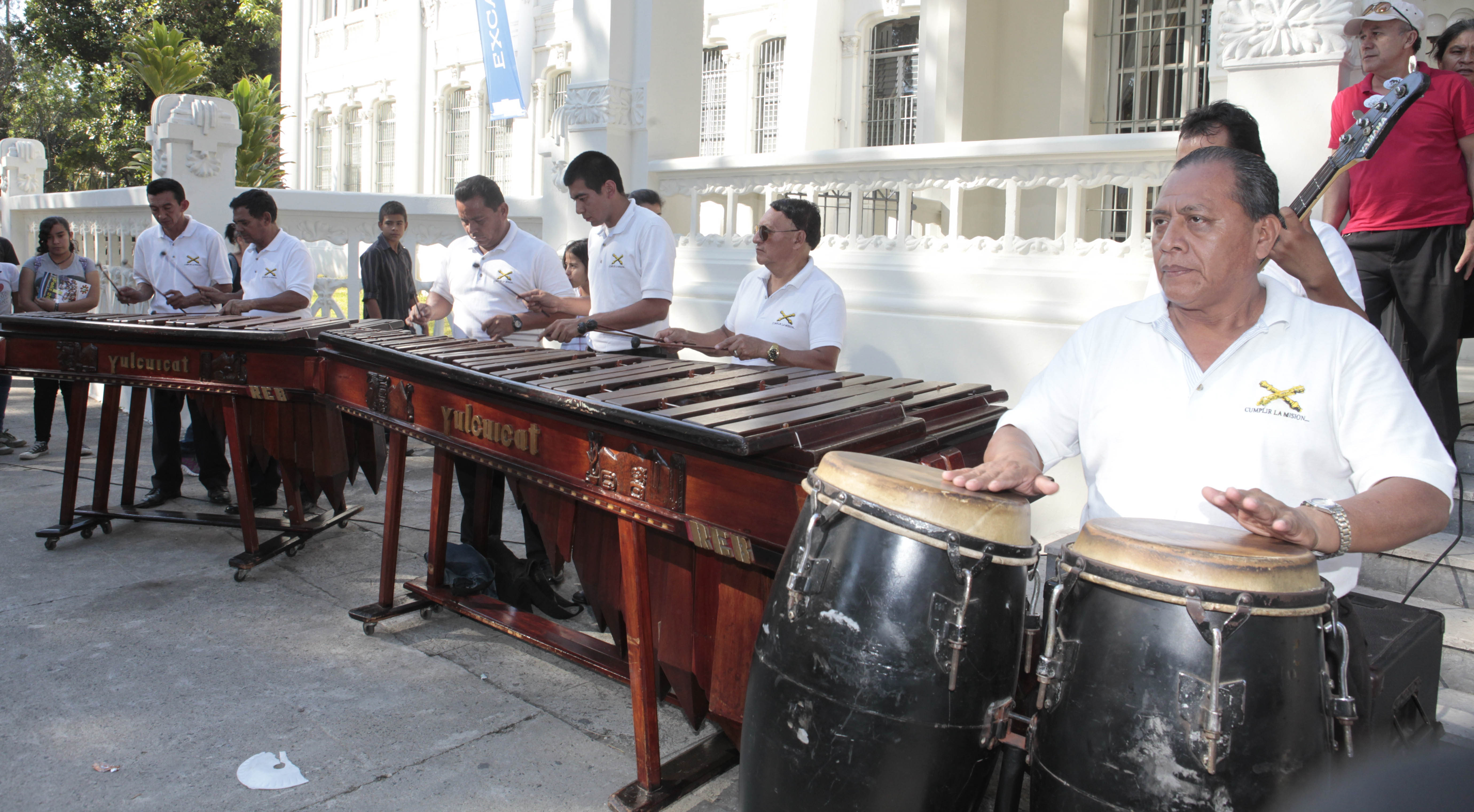
Musical instruments such as the Marimba and Conga drums Made their way to El Salvador via the transatlantic slave trade.

There also exists the chanfaina dish; the canasto; the marimba instrument, some variants of witchcraft, and the black Christ statues scattered around the country. By non-indigenous José Simeón Cañas in 1823, the works of Salarrué, Francisco Gavidia, David J. Guzmán, and Benjamin Saul are also cultural-anthropological works that are also well-known.

== Notable people ==
=== Politics ===
==== Activism ====
- Prudencia Ayala, an Afro-Indigenous Salvadoran writer, social activist, and pioneer campaigner for women's rights in El Salvador and the first woman to run for president in El Salvador and Latin America.

=== Music ===
- Sabi, an American pop singer, songwriter, dancer and actress from Los Angeles, California: born to a Salvadoran mother and an African-American father.

=== Sports ===
==== Soccer ====
- Luis Ramírez Zapata, a retired Salvadoran footballer, Nicknamed El Pelé, he spent nearly 20 years playing for Salvadoran club Águila.
- Luis Guevara Mora, a Salvadoran former goalkeeper, Nicknamed el Negro, became a member of the El Salvador national team and represented his country at the 1982 FIFA World Cup.
- Brayan Gil, footballer
