= Ateneo de El Salvador =

Cultural institution in El Salvador founded in 1912

Athenaeum of El Salvador Ateneo de El Salvador
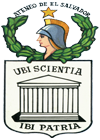
- Named after: Athenaeum
- Founded: 22 September 1912; 113 years ago
- Type: Not-for-profit cultural institution
- Purpose: Elevate the national culture in all its manifestations.
- Headquarters: San Salvador, San Salvador, El Salvador
- Region served: El Salvador
- Official language: Spanish
- Website: biblioteca.utec.edu.sv/sitios/ateneo/

Ateneo de El Salvador (Athenaeum of El Salvador) is a cultural, literary and artistic institution, founded in 1912 and whose headquarters are located in San Salvador. It has become a benchmark of national culture and prominent intellectuals from El Salvador have passed through it.

== History ==
In March 1911, Salvadoran president Manuel Enrique Araujo initiated his presidential term, who gave his approval for the creation of an athenaeum. The Athenaeum of El Salvador was founded on September 22, 1912, by José Dolores Corpeño, Manuel Álvarez Magaña, Jorge F. Zepeda, Armando Rodríguez Portillo, Salvador Turcios R., Salvador L. Erazo, Manuel Andino, José Burgos Cuéllar, J. Fernando Chávez, Manuel Masferrer C., Miguel Ángel García, J. Antonio Irías, Augusto Castro, Joaquín Serra (h), Juan Gomar and Abraham Ramírez Peña, choosing José Dolores Corpeño as provisional president, with the purpose of "elevate the national culture in all its manifestations".

On December 1, 1912, the Ateneo magazine was created, which collects much of the cultural work of the institution and the intellectual contributions of its members.

On November 15, 1974, the Athenaeum inaugurated its own building in the country's Government Center.

On November 22, 2007, the Legislative Assembly of El Salvador declared the Athenaeum "Distinguished Cultural Institution of El Salvador" for "its prolific cultural work for the benefit of the enhancement of our Homeland".

== Featured historical members ==
- Francisco Gavidia
- Alberto Masferrer
- José Gustavo Guerrero
- José María Peralta Lagos
- Miguel Ángel García
- Manuel Vidal
- David J. Guzmán
- Ramón López Jiménez
- Sarbelio Navarrete
- Jorge Larde y Larín
- Joaquín Hernández Callejas
- Manuel Luis Escamilla
