= Lucila Estrada de Pérez =

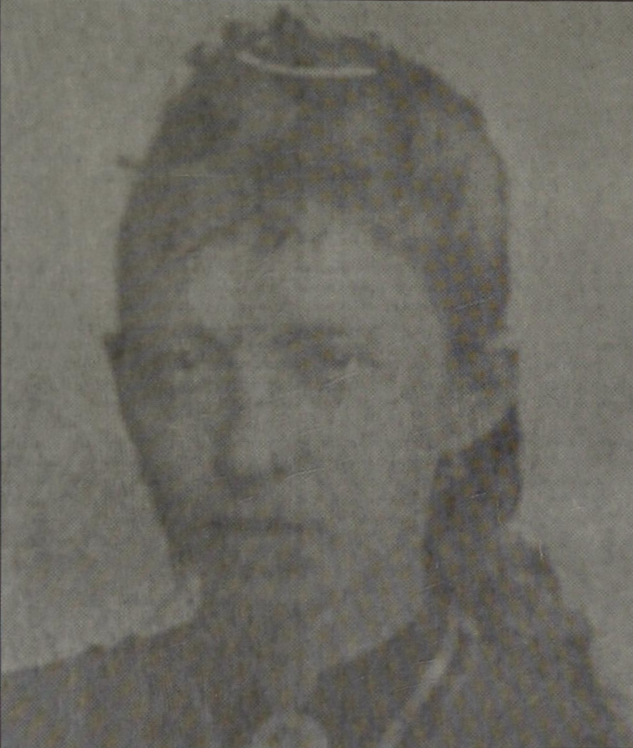
- Born: 1856; Gracias
- Died: 1949; Gracias
- Occupation: Poet

Lucila Estrada de Pérez (1856 – 1949) was a Honduran poet.

She was born Lucila Estrada Marin in 1856 in Gracias, Honduras, the daughter of José Simón Estrada and Elena Marín de Estrada. After the death of her father, she was raised in El Salvador by her uncle, General Ezequiel Marín. When she was twenty two, General Marín accompanied former Honduran president José María Medina on a raid of Santa Rosa de Copán, which resulted in their arrest and execution by firing squad in 1878. She was finally able to return to Honduras during the presidency of Luis Bográn. There she married Tito Pérez and they had five children.

Estrada de Pérez published her verse primarily in Honduran and Salvadoran newspapers edited by Román Mayorga Rivas: El Cometa, El Independiente, and Diario del Salvador. She was the first woman to publish poetry in El Salvador under her own name. Her best known poems are "Mi destino es sufrir", "A la tienda," and "A una flor inodora." Her work has been anthologized in Honduras literaria, escritos en prosa y verso (1899), Joyas Poéticas (1971), Cuadernos de Parla (1992), and Honduras, mujer y poesía : antología de poesía hondureña escrita por mujeres, 1865-1998 (1998).

Lucila Estrada de Pérez died on 1949 in Gracias.
