= Miguel Álvarez Castro =

Salvadoran politician & poet (1795–1856)

Miguel Álvarez Castro (1795–1856) was a Salvadoran politician and poet. He is considered the first Salvadoran national poet.

Álvarez Castro was born on a hacienda near the city of San Miguel, El Salvador. In his youth, he studied in the Colegio de Infantes in Antigua Guatemala, but he was forced to abandon his studies after the death of his parents.

He was a member of the 1822 constituent assembly in the First Mexican Empire. During the era of the Federal Republic of Central America under Francisco Morazán, he became a Minister of Foreign Relations. A loyal follower of Morazán, Álvarez Castro followed Morazán into exile in Costa Rica until Morazán's execution.

In El Salvador, Álvarez Castro participated in the attempted overthrow of Francisco Malespín, after which he exiled himself in Nicaragua. After Malespín's fall from power, Álvarez Castro returned to his country where he retired from public life. His poetry is collected in anthologies like Guirnalda Salvadoreña (1884) by Román Mayorga Rivas and Galería poética centroamericana (1888) by Ramón Uriarte.

Álvarez Castro was known for his neoclassical poetical works, with subjects from the pastoral to the patriotic. Some of his most famous poems included "A la meurte del Coronel Pierzon" [Upon the Death of Colonel Pierzon] and "Al ciudadano Jose del Valle" [Ode to Jose del Valle, Citizen"].

He died in poverty in 1856.

== Bibliography ==
- Cañas Dinarte, Carlos (2000). Diccionario escolar de autores salvadoreños. San Salvador: Dirección de publicaciones e impresos.
- Escobar Galindo, David (1995). Índice antológico de la poesía salvadoreña. San Salvador : UCA Editores. ISBN 8484050548.
