= Juan Díaz (friar) =

Dominican priest

- Born: Sonsonate, El Salvador
- Died: October 17, 1651; Guatemala
- Occupations: Dominican priest and friar
- Writing career
- Language: Spanish
- Notable work: Vida y virtudes del venerable fray Andrés del Valle

Juan Díaz (died 1651) was a priest and friar of the Dominican Order known for writing the biography Vida y virtudes del venerable fray Andrés del Valle.

Díaz was born in Sonsonate, El Salvador and took his vows in Guatemala. Over the course of his career, he headed the Convento de Santo Domingo in Sonsonate and administered several towns including Escuintla, Guatemala.

Díaz was a follower of the friar Andrés del Valle, and his biography Vida y virtudes del venerable fray Andrés del Valle (Life and Virtues of the Venerable Friar Andrés del Valle) is a principal example of early Salvadoran literature. The National Library of Guatemala holds the manuscript of this work.

Díaz died at an advanced age in Guatemala on October 17, 1651.

== See also ==
- Salvadoran literature
