= Isabel Dada =

Salvadoran actress and poet

- Born: Isabel Dada Rinker; September 11, 1941; San Salvador, El Salvador
- Died: June 14, 2017 (aged 75); San Salvador, El Salvador
- Occupations: Actress, poet
- Awards: National Culture Award (2008)

Isabel Dada Rinker (September 11, 1941 – June 14, 2017) was a Salvadoran actress and poet, considered a pioneer of theater in El Salvador.

== Training and artistic career ==
Isabel Dada was born in San Salvador on September 11, 1941, the daughter of Teresa Rinker de Dada (born in Nicaragua and naturalized Honduran), and Ventura M. Dada (born in Jerusalem and nationalized German, whose ancestors were from Greece). She first performed at the National Theater of El Salvador in the play Soy una linda muñeca for three years. She traveled to the United States to study for a Bachelor of Commerce and Bilingual Secretariat degree, and at 18 she went to Mexico to attend a theater course.

Her career as a professional actress began in 1967 when she joined the University Theater of the University of El Salvador, under Spanish director Edmundo Barbero.

In 1969, she played Olivia, the protagonist of Los peces fuera del agua, which, under the direction of José David Calderón, became the first fiction feature film produced in El Salvador.

In 1993, Dada founded the William Shakespeare Theater Academy. In 1996, she was nominated for the Helen Hayes Award in Washington, D.C., for her role as El Ama in the production of Doña Rosita la soltera. The same year, she began hosting the radio show Homenaje a la Vida, which was dedicated to universal poetry.

On October 16, 2003, she was recognized by the Legislative Assembly as "Most Meritorious Actress of El Salvador", by virtue of "the outstanding contributions made to the scenic art of our country."

In 2008, she received the National Culture Award from the President of El Salvador.

In 2016, she was part of the cast of the film Volar: una historia sobre el olvido, under the direction of Brenda Vanegas, playing Esther, a woman with Alzheimer's disease.

Isabel Dada died in San Salvador on June 14, 2017, due to health problems.

== Plays written ==
- 1994–1996: La Madona de las cuatro lunas

== Filmography ==
- 1969: Los peces fuera del agua
- 2006: Volar: una historia sobre el olvido

== Awards and nominations ==
- 1996: Nominated for the Helen Hayes Award for her role as El Ama in Doña Rosita la soltera
- 1999: Nominated as an honorary member of the Ateneo de El Salvador
- 2000: Nominated as a "Notable Figure of the 20th Century" by the Mayor of San Salvador
- 2003: Named "Most Meritorious Actress of El Salvador" by the Legislative Assembly
- 2008: National Culture Award presented by the President of El Salvador
