= Alegría, El Salvador =

City and municipality in Usulután, El Salvador

Alegría
- Municipality
- Ciudad de Alegría
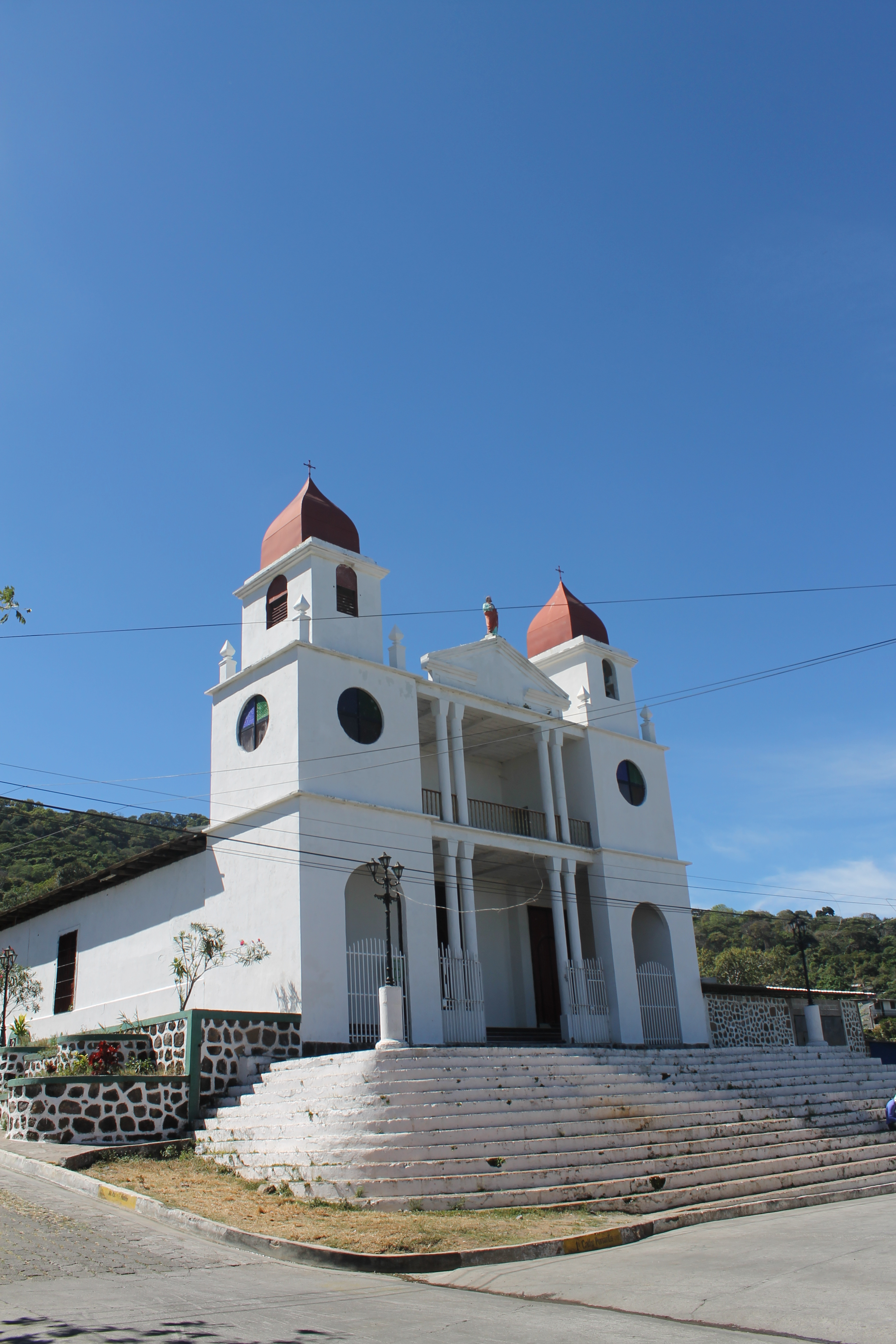
- The Parish Church of San Pedro Apóstol in the town center
- Nickname: La Esmeralda de América (The Emerald of America)
- Location in El Salvador
- Coordinates: 13°30′N 88°29′W
- Country: El Salvador
- Department: Usulután
- District: Alegría
- Founded: Pre-Columbian (as Tecapa)
- City status: February 17, 1891

Area
  - Total: 40.41 km^{2} (15.60 sq mi)
- Elevation: 1,200 m (3,900 ft)

Population (2007)
  - Total: 11,712

Alegría is a prominent municipality and city located in the Usulután Department of El Salvador. Situated within the Sierra de Chinameca at an altitude of over 1,200 meters, it is widely regarded as one of the most picturesque towns in the country. It is famous for its Eternal Spring climate, its deep intellectual history as the Cradle of Culture, and the Laguna de Alegría, which sits within the crater of the Tecapa Volcano.

== History ==
=== Pre-Columbian and Colonial Eras ===
The region was originally inhabited by the Lenca people. The settlement was known as Tecapa, a name derived from the Nahuat language meaning Lagoon of Stones (tetet = stone, apa = lagoon), referring to the volcanic crater lake nearby. During the Spanish colonial period, it remained a small agricultural outpost.

=== The 19th Century and Renaming ===
In 1838, the priest and scholar José Miguel Alegría established a prestigious school of philosophy in the town. His educational influence was so profound that it attracted students from across the region, establishing the town as an intellectual hub. Following his death, the Legislative Assembly of El Salvador officially changed the town's name from Tecapa to Alegría on February 17, 1891, to honor his contributions to Salvadoran education.

== Geography ==
Alegría is characterized by its rugged volcanic topography on the slopes of the Tecapa Volcano, part of the Chinameca volcanic range.

=== Climate ===
Due to its elevation (1,200 metres (3,900 ft) to 1,600 metres (5,200 ft)), Alegría experiences a tropical highland climate. Temperatures are significantly cooler than the coastal plains of Usulután, rarely exceeding 25 °C (77 °F).

=== Laguna de Alegría ===
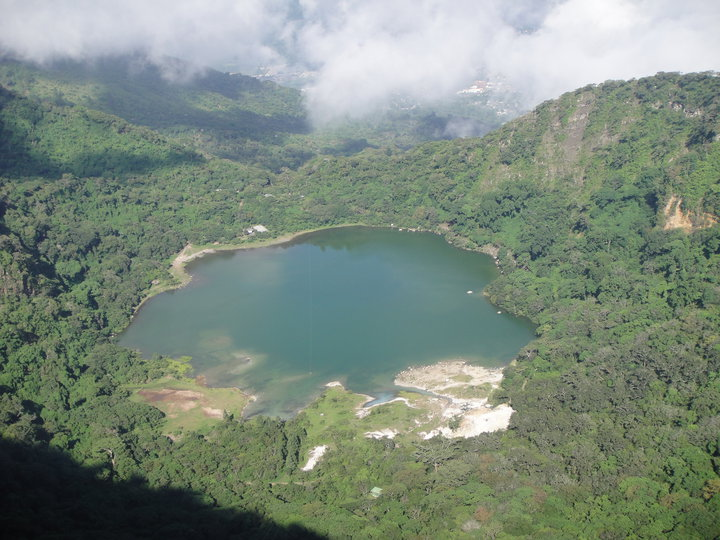
Laguna de Alegría

Located 2 kilometers south of the town center, the Laguna de Alegría is a crater lake within the Tecapa Volcano (1,593 metres (5,226 ft)). The water is known for its high sulfur content and yellow-green hue. In 1945, Chilean Nobel laureate Gabriela Mistral visited the site and famously dubbed it the Emerald of America (La Esmeralda de América). The lake is surrounded by thermal springs and fumaroles, such as El Bufadero and El Pinar.

== Landmarks and Culture ==
=== Historic Center ===
The town is noted for its well-preserved cobblestone streets and colonial-style architecture.

- Parish Church of San Pedro Apóstol: Built starting in 1870, this church houses the remains of José Miguel Alegría.
- Casa de Alberto Masferrer: The family home of the famous philosopher is a protected cultural site, representing the intellectual heritage of the Vitalismo movement.
- Main Streets: The two primary arteries of the city are named Calle Alberto Masferrer and Calle Manuel Enrique Araujo, honoring the town's most illustrious residents.

== Economy ==
The economy of Alegría is based on traditional agriculture and modern eco-tourism.

- Coffee: The high altitude allows for the production of premium strictly high grown (SHG) coffee.
- Viveros: The town is famous for its plant nurseries, which grow tropical flowers such as orchids and bromelias.
- Tourism: As a member of the Pueblos Vivos circuit, the town is a major destination for its viewpoints (Mirador de las 100 gradas) and traditional gastronomy.

== Notable people ==
- Alberto Masferrer (1868–1932): Influential philosopher and writer.
- Manuel Enrique Araujo (1865–1913): President of El Salvador (1911–1913). Born in Hacienda Condadillo, near the town, he was a physician and reformist leader who was assassinated in office.
- José Miguel Alegría (1795–1869): Renowned educator and priest.
