= Arturo Ambrogi =

Writer and journalist

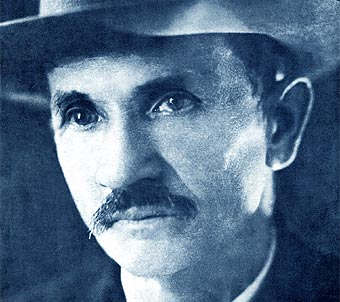
- Born: 1875; San Salvador, El Salvador
- Died: 1936 (aged 60–61); San Salvador, El Salvador
- Occupations: Writer and journalist
- Known for: Novels about traditional Salvadoran peasant life

Arturo Ambrogi (1875 – 1936 in San Salvador, El Salvador) was a writer and journalist, considered one of the pioneers of Salvadoran literature, along with Francisco Gavidia and Alberto Masferrer. Ambrogi's narrative was influenced by romance and Spanish American modernism and his stories are chronicles of all aspects of traditional peasant life in El Salvador.

The son of an Italian immigrant, at 16 years old, he met the Nicaraguan poet Rubén Darío. Working as a journalist, he traveled in his youth in Europe, South America and the Far East. On his travels he met Uruguayan writer José Ingenieros. He received an elite training in literature to the point that he was arguably the best informed of his era in El Salvador.

He never married or had children, although his brother Constantino Ambrogi Acosta settled in Nicaragua where their offspring have continued the literary tradition.

He died in 1936 and was buried in the cemetery of the town of Jinotepe.

Notable works include "Cuentos y Fantasías" (1895), "Máscaras, Manchas y Sensaciones" (1901), "El Libro del Trópico" (1907), "Sensaciones del Japón y de la China" (1915) and "El Jetón" (1936).
