= Francisco Gavidia =

Salvadoran writer and politician (1863-1955)

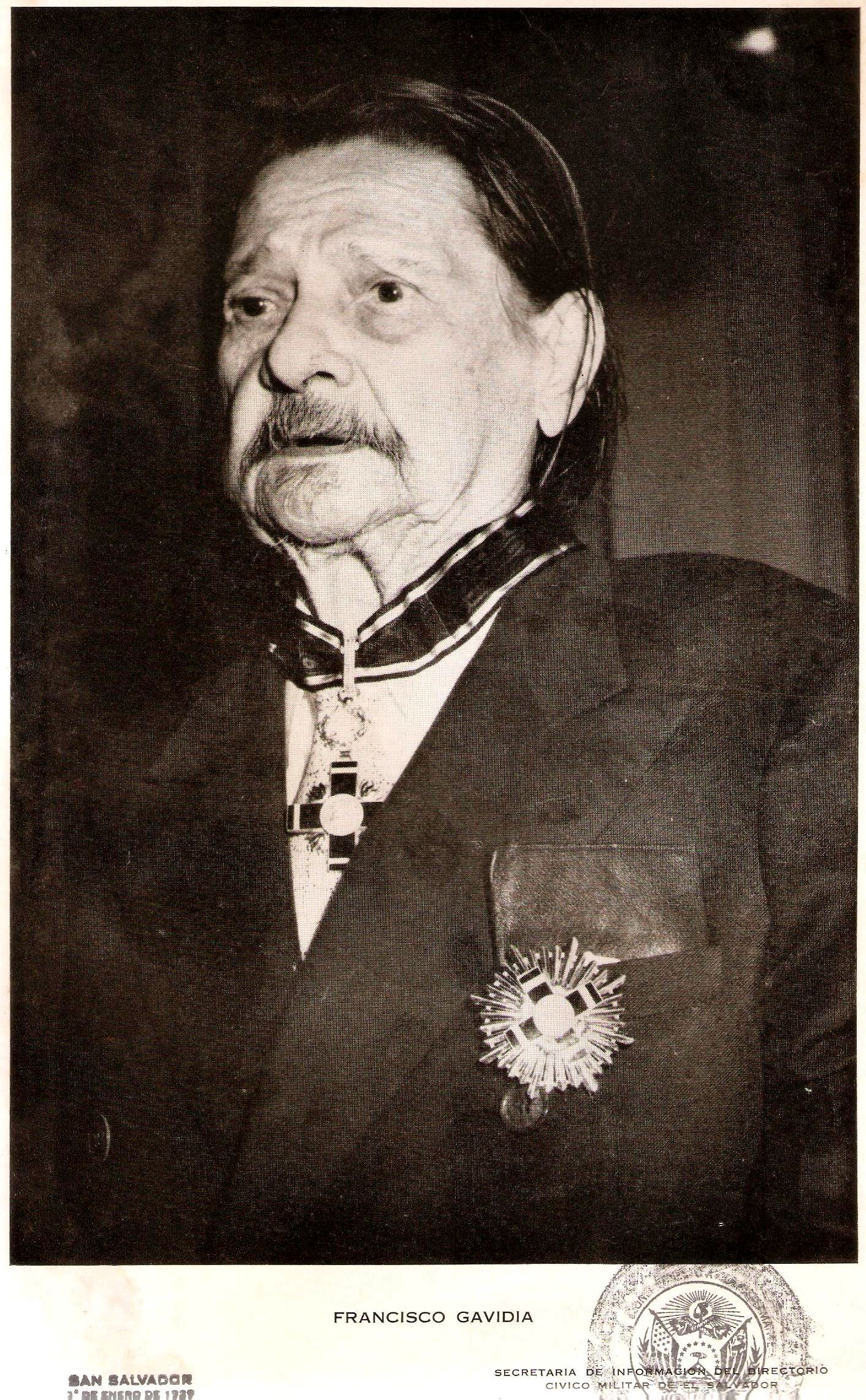
- Francisco Gavidia.
- Born: Francisco Antonio Gavidia Guandique; December 29, 1863; San Miguel, El Salvador
- Died: 24 September 1955 (aged 91); San Salvador, El Salvador
- Occupations: writer, educator, historian, politician, speaker, translator and journalist
- Relatives: Francisco Antonio Gavidia (father); Eloisa Guandique de Gavidia (mother)

Francisco Antonio Gavidia Guandique (1863 – 24 September 1955) was a prominent Salvadoran writer, historian, politician, speaker, translator, educator and journalist. His poetry evolved from romanticism to a reflective direction and conceptual character. He was greatly influenced by French poetry of the time and he introduced Rubén Darío to adapt the Alexandrian verse to the Castilian metre in addition to entering the story, poetry and essays. The trajectory of his poetry is similar to the one of his theater, as he demonstrates in his dramas Jupiter (1885), Ursino (1889), Count of San Salvador or the God of the things (1901), Lucia Lasso or the Pirates (1914) and the Ivory Tower (1920), and the dramatic poem Princess Catalá (1944).

== Childhood ==
A son of Francisco Antonio Gavidia and of Eloisa Guandique de Gavidia, was born in the municipality of Cacahuatique, today Ciudad Barrios, San Miguel, El Salvador. Due to the loss of the original birth certificate, there was a debate about the year of his birth. According to Hugo Lindo, the year 1865 was chosen because there were indications that supported this theory, but there are other data that approach the year to 1863. In fact, according to a Decree of the Legislative Assembly of the Republic of El Salvador, the latter is recognized as the date of his birth.

Due to the death of his mother, when it counted on 8 years of age, Francisco Gavidia moved to the property of his father located in the north of the San Miguel department of San Miguel, in the present municipality of Ciudad Barrios. In 1880, he obtained the Bachelor's degree in Sciences and Letters, and then moved to San Salvador where he entered the Faculty of Jurisprudence of the University of El Salvador. However, he left the race after a year, to become a self-taught.

== Links with Rubén Darío ==
By 1882, he was a member of the literary group "La Juventud" and already showed a strong interest in French verses. It was in that same year, according to numerous sources, that knew to Rubén Darío. Both developed a strong friendship until the point that in 1890, Gavidia was godfather of weddings of Darío.

== Career ==
Countless books in Spanish and French passed through his hands. In order to recover from the illness caused by overwork and mental fatigue resulting from his intense intellectual activity, he was sent to Paris by order of the president Rafael Zaldívar.

Gavidia had a large cultural heritage and was able to find a place in the city of Gavidia. It mentions that he dominated perfectly the German, French, English, Italian, Portuguese, Hebrew, Latin and Greek, besides the Mayan-Quiché language for which he got to develop a grammar in order to popularize the language. He also developed a language, called "Salvador", which sought to become universal, but received very little support from the intellectuals of his time, despite everything, Gavidia published some poems in "Los Argonautas" "Language Salvador", among which stand out "The Argonauts" and "A Marconi".

The year 1887 contracted marriage with the daughter of the journalist Carlos Bonilla. A year later, he founded the newspaper "El semanario noticioso", which was published every Thursday, as well as the Academy of Sciences and Fine Arts of San Salvador. After the overthrow of the general Francisco Menéndez Valdivieso, Gavidia exiled of the country and continued his journalistic activity in Costa Rica, where he was director of "La Prensa Libre" between 1891 and 1892; and later in Guatemala worked like co-redactor of "El bien público" of the city of Quetzaltenango.

When he returned to El Salvador, he served as editor of the Diario Oficial (1894), Director of Primary Public Education (1896) and Minister of Public Instruction (1898). In 1895 he founded the Parliamentary Party, and also served as a professor at the Normal School of Ladies, the National Institute of Men, and the University of El Salvador. He founded the magazine Los Andes. From 1906 to 1919, he held the position of titular director of the National Library Francisco Gavidia. In 1912, he became a member of the Ateneo of El Salvador.

== Works ==
Francisco Gavidia

The work of Gavidia reaches encyclopedic proportions. He worked in poetry, theater, history, music, essay, pedagogy, philosophy, politics, journalism, literary criticism and translation. His vast knowledge was nurtured from classical literature, siglo de oro español the Golden Age, French culture and his language, and the reading of German, Italian and Oriental authors. He came to create a new language to be universally understood, which had the name "Salvador Language". In addition, he was a precursor in the treatment of indigenous issues and ideologist of the unionismo centroamericano.

In a country whose art received a strong European influence, Gavidia honored the Salvadoran identity and ethnic values, broke with that pattern and from there, other writers decided to follow that literary line. One can observe its influence in artists like Salarrué, Claudia Lars and Arturo Ambrogi. He introduced the story with a literary identity typical of its reality, an amalgam of pre-Columbian Indian themes such as legends and myths, is also considered the precursor of Salvadoran theater. Between its dramaturgy stands Ursino, the tower of ivory and Jupiter. The longing for identity, freedom and justice is also reflected in his poetry, which at the time many failed to assimilate because the desire to universalize Salvadoran idiosyncrasy was a fact not understandable for his time and for his peers.

Already in his work "Versos", he uses some of the main characteristics of vocabulary, rhythm and poetical metre that, soon after, would encode and to devote masterfully Rubén Darío. Subsequently, Gavidia evolved in the particular modulation of his own poetic voice, until he came to the cultivation of a conceptual reflection that reaches its maximum splendor in the poem entitled "Sóteer o Tierra de preseas" (1949), a modern epic song that, to a large extent, constitutes his masterpiece and his great literary legacy.

But between that initial romantic stage and this lyrical introspection, Gavidia created works and an essay that went through many different stages and aesthetic trends.

Indeed, Gavidia himself was able to evolve from a late romanticism (or a pre-modernist glimpse) into dramas such as "Jupiter" (1885) or "Ursino" (1889), to a conceptual epic manifested in the dramatic poem entitled La princesa Citalá (1944). On average, there are some plays as different from one another, such as Conde de San Salvador or El Dios de las Cosas (1901), Lucía Lasso o Los piratas (1914), La torre de marfil (1920) and Héspero (1931).

Some of his works are:

- Poesía (poetic booklet, 1877).
- Versos (poetry, 1884).
- Ursino (theater, 1887).
- Júpiter (theater, 1895).
- The encomendero and other short stories (1901)
- Study and summary of the Discourse on the method of Descartes, (1901).
- Traditions (on the homonymous work of Ricardo Palma, 1901).
- Count of San Salvador or the God of Las Casas (novel, 1901).
- 1814 (ensayo, 1905).
- Works (volume I, 1913).
- Modern History of El Salvador (two volumes, 1917 and 1918).
- Songbook of the XIX Century (1929-1930).
- Tales and narrations (1931).
- Hesperia (theater, 1931).
- Speeches, studies and conferences (1941).
- La princesa Citalá (theater, 1946).
- Tale of sailors (1947).
- Sóteer or Land of Preseas (1949).

== Achievements ==
He is also known for being the advisor of the poet Rubén Darío, a pupil who shared sorrows and joys with the Salvadoran teacher, and who knew the experiment of Gavidia to adapt the Alexandrian verse to the Castilian metric, which gave rise to the modernist renovation of Spanish American poetry. Dario wrote in his autobiography:

With Gavidia, the first time I was in that Salvadoran land, with whom they enter into fervent initiation, into the harmonious forest of Victor Hugo; and of the mutual reading of the Alexandrians of the great French, which Gavidia, the first probably to rehearse in Castilian in the French way, came to me the idea of metric renewal, which I had to expand and carry on later.

The Salvadoran government declared Francisco Gavidia as "Salvadoran meritísimo" in 1933 and in 1939 the city of San Miguel paid him a tribute that included the baptism with his name of the theater of the city. In 1937, Gavidia was a member of the Committee on Intellectual Cooperation of El Salvador, Dependency of the League of Nations and in 1941 the University of El Salvador granted him the Doctorate Honoris Causa. At the end of his life, he was awarded the highest national award in El Salvador, the order "Jose Matías Delgado", which he received from the hands of President Óscar Osorio in his sickbed at Hospital Rosales, a few days before death.

== See also ==
- Vicente Acosta
- Arturo Ambrogi
- Afro-Salvadoran
- Román Mayorga Rivas
- Salvadoran literature
- List of Central American writers

== Bibliography ==
- Canas Dinarte, Carlos (2000). Publications and Print Address (ed.). Diccionario Escolar de Autores Salvadoreños (in Spanish).
