= El Jetón =

1936 novel by Arturo Ambrogi

Blanca Olmedo
- Author: Arturo Ambrogi
- Language: Spanish
- Genre: Costumbrismo
- Publisher: Dirección de Publicaciones
- Publication date: 1936
- Publication place: El Salvador

El Jetón is the final novel published by Salvadoran writer Arturo Ambrogi shortly before his death in 1936. It is considered a classic in Salvadoran literature.

According to one review (translated from Spanish):

It is the most mature and complete work of the author. It presents a personal vision of the rural environment of El Salvador. With lucid, detailed, dazzling, tremendous prose, he penetrates the customs and the reality of the agricultural worker, wrapped in an atmosphere of superstition, indigence, myth, and fantasy.

Stories:

- El Jetón
- El Arreo
- Cuando Brama la Barra
- La Molienda
- La Bruja
- La Sacadera
- Las Pescas del Miércoles de Ceniza
- La Muerte del Rey Moro
- La Siguanaba
- El Chapulín
- El Rezo del Santo
- El Bruno
- La Merca del Acordeón
- Las Panchitas
