= Salarrué =

Salvadoran writer, poet, and painter (1899–1975)

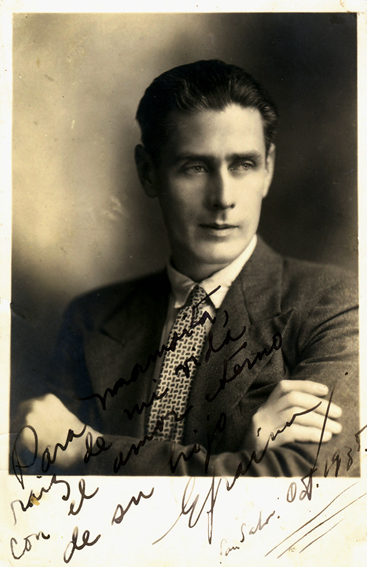
- Born: Luis Salvador Efraín Salazar Arrué; October 22, 1899; Sonsonate, El Salvador
- Died: November 27, 1975 (aged 76); San Salvador, El Salvador
- Occupations: Author, editor, painter, diplomat
- Spouse: Zélie Lardé

Luis Salvador Efraín Salazar Arrué (October 22, 1899 – November 27, 1975), known as Salarrué (a derivation of his surnames), was a Salvadoran writer, poet, and painter.

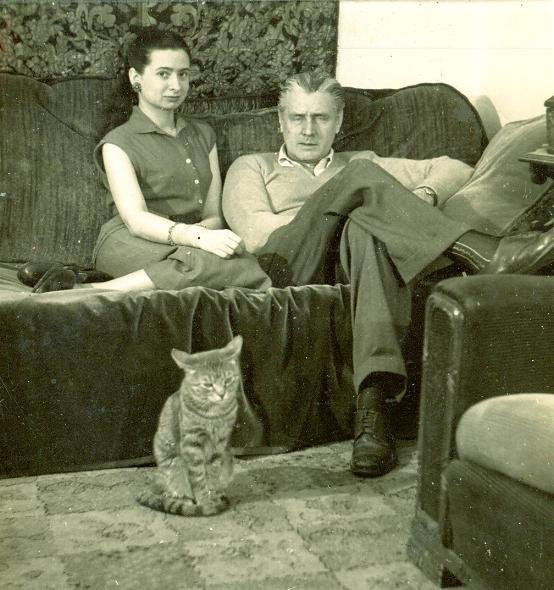
Salarrué

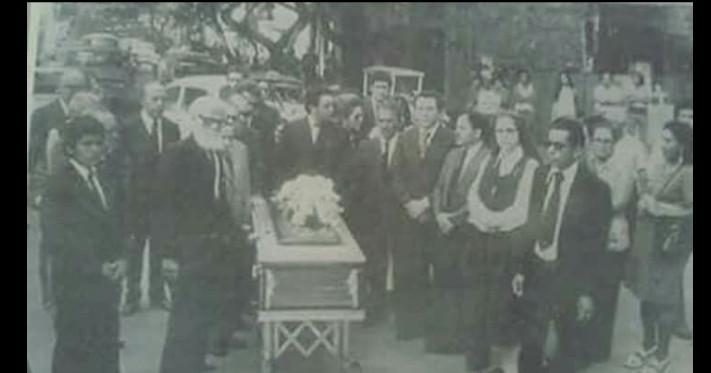
Funeral Of Salvador Salazar Arrué Salarrue.

Born in Sonsonate to a well-off family, Salarrué trained as a painter at the Corcoran School of Art, in Washington, D.C., from 1916 to 1919. He then returned to El Salvador and, in 1922, married fellow painter Zélie Lardé, with whom he had three daughters. In the late 1920s he worked as editor for the newspaper Patria, owned by Alberto Masferrer, an important Salvadoran intellectual. To fill in blank spaces in the newspaper, Salarrué wrote a series of short stories which were collected thirty years later as Cuentos de Cipotes ("Children's Stories"). These and the stories in Cuentos de Barro ("Tales of Clay") became Salarrué's most popular and enduring work, reflecting an idealized version of rural life in El Salvador and making him one of the founders of the new wave of Latin American folkloric narrative (narrativa costumbrista).

However, few readers understand that the stories in Cuentos de Barro were an ingenious literary feat of Salarrué. By disguising through a subtle use of a non-standard, highly inventive language and style, he was able to recall to readers a La Matanza, a massacre carried out by the Salvadoran president General Maximiliano Hernández Martínez in 1932, without the authorities being able to interpret Salarrué's defamation of Martínez.

Salarrué lived in the United States from 1947 to 1951 while representing his country in diplomatic posts. He died in Los Planes de Renderos, near San Salvador, and is buried in the Cemetery of Distinguished Citizens.

== Biography ==
=== Childhood and youth ===
In the 19th century Alejandro Arrué Jiménez (an educator from Basque Country who had worked in various Latin American countries) married Lucía Gómez, native of Sensuntepeque, El Salvador. The marriage engendered many children, Luz and María Teresa among them. They each had literary vocations, but it was Luz, after Miranda, when the family resided in El Salvador, who attained inclusion by the journalist Román Mayorga Rivas in the anthology of poetry "Guirnalda Salvadoreña."

Meanwhile, María Teresa married Joaquín Salazar Angulo, a budding musician from an honorable family. However, for various reasons, the relationship did not prosper which obligated the young mother to provide for her children, Joaquín and Luis Salvador Efraín, alone. The latter was born on a family estate situated in the El Mojón district that would become, in part, the urban zone for the municipality of Sonzacate, in Sonsonate. In the following years, the Salazar family lived in financial hardship even though they received help from close family members since their respected ancestry favored them.

The childhood of Luis Salvador transpired surrounded by the natural tropical splendor of Sonsonate. Although timid and distant with regards to rough and tumble games, he was set apart for his ability to invent stories. When he was eight his mother's financial difficulty forced her to move; for this reason young Luis alternated between his home in San Salvador and Santa Tecla where he lived in the same residence as his cousins Núñez Arrué, of whom one was Toño Salazar, later a renowned cartoonist. For their sustenance Luis's mother worked as a seamstress and acquired her own dress-making academy. Toño gave a description of his cousin in those years:

"Luis Salvador attended elementary in the pedigreed institute Liceo Salvadoreño. He attended high school in the Instituto Nacional de Varones and later in the Academia de Comercio, where he did not finish his studies, yet he always had good grades."

His artistic vocation was already manifest at the age of 11 when one of his compositions was published in the Diario de El Salvador by Román Mayorga Rivas. The achievement was not luck given that he must have associated with local intellectuals that frequented the house of the family Núñez Arrué .

== Works ==
- El Cristo Negro (The Black Christ) (1926)
- El Señor de la Burbuja (The Lord of The Bubble) (1927)
- O Yarkandal (1929)
- Remotando el Uluán (Remoting the Uluan) (1932)
- Cuentos de Barro (Clay Stories) (1934)
- Conjeturas en la Penumbra (Conjectures in the twilight) (1934)
- Eso y Más (That and More) (1940)
- Cuentos de Cipotes (Children Stories) (1945).
- Trasmallo (1954)
- La Espada y Otras Narraciones (The Sword and Other Narrations) (1960)
- Vilanos (1969)
- El Libro Desnudo (The Naked Book) (1969)
- Ingrimo (1969)
- La Sombra y Otros Motivos Literiarios (The Shadow and other Literary Motifs) (1969)
- La Sed de Sling Bader (Sling Bader's Thirst) (1971)
- Catleya Luna (1974)
- Mundo Nomasito (Poesía -1975)
