= Román Mayorga Rivas =

Nicaraguan journalist and poet (1862–1925)

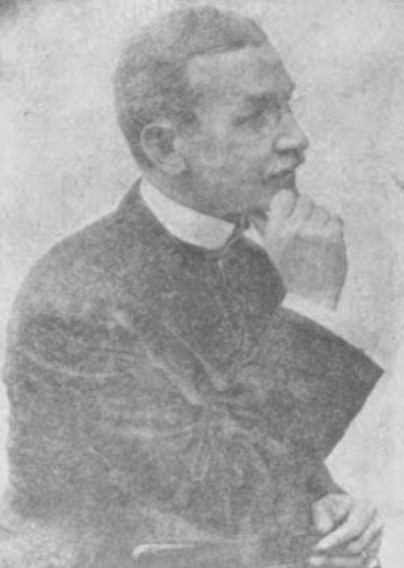
- Born: 1862; León, Nicaragua
- Died: 28 December 1925 (aged 62–63); San Salvador, El Salvador
- Occupations: Journalist, poet

Román Mayorga Rivas (1862 – 28 December 1925) was a Nicaraguan journalist and poet. He is considered the founder of modern journalism in El Salvador.

== Biography ==
Mayorga Rivas was born in 1862 in León, Nicaragua. Mayorga Rivas was the son of the politician Cleto Mayorga, and the grandson of the Nicaraguan President Patricio Rivas. He was a childhood friend of Rubén Darío and José Martí. He moved to the city of San Salvador, El Salvador at the age of twelve and studied at the school of Hildebrando Martí and Anselmo Valdés. In 1876, he founded the newspaper El cometa, and he later founded Diario del cometa (1878) and El estudiante. In late 1879 he returned to Nicaragua to participate in intellectual life of his hometown, León.

Between 1884 and 1886, Mayorga Rivas published his first three-volume anthology, Guirnalda Salvadoreña, which collected biographical information and the works of Salvadoran poets. During this period, he also founded the newspaper El independiente in Granada, Nicaragua, the city where he also was married. After returning to El Salvador, he established the newspaper Diario del Salvador (1895–1932), one of the most important newspapers in Central Americal and the most modern of that era, for which a duplex printer was first brought to El Salvador. In his journalism, Mayorga Rivas collaborated with many notable writers, including Francisco Gavidia, David J. Guzmán, Porfirio Barba Jacob (known as Ricardo Arenales), and José María Peralta Lagos.

In the field of literature, Mayorga Rivas is considered a part of the second wave of romanticism in El Salvador, and also an important promoter of modernismo. He also translated from English, Italian, Portuguese, and French literary works. He became a member of the Academia Salvadoreña de la Lengua in 1915, and that year he also published his only book of poetry, Viejo y nuevo.

As a public official, Mayorga Rivas headed the Oficina Central de Estadística in El Salvador. He also served as Secretary of the Nicaraguan Embassy in Washington D.C., Undersecretary of Foreign Affairs and Public Instruction in Nicaragua, and El Salvador's envoy to the Panamerican Conference in Rio de Janeiro, Brazil.

Mayorga Rivas died on 28 December 1925 in San Salvador, El Salvador.
