= Vicente Acosta =

Salvadoran poet

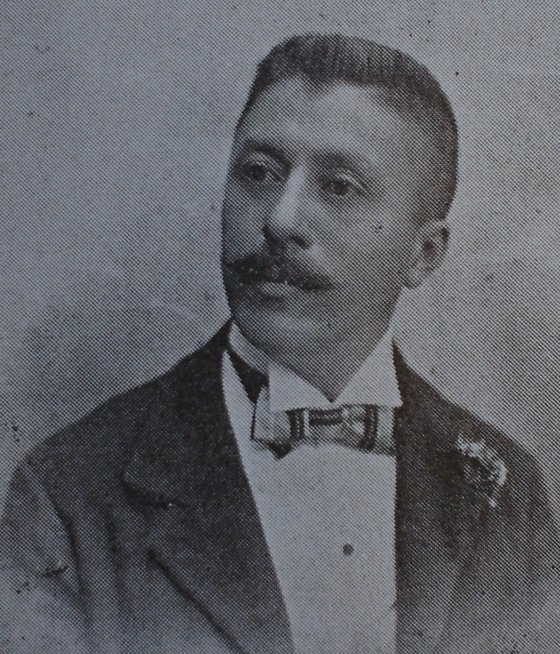
- Vicente Acosta
- Born: 24 July 1867; Apopa, El Salvador
- Died: 24 July 1908 (aged 41); Tegucigalpa, Honduras
- Occupation: Poet
- Movement: Modernism

Vicente Acosta (24 July 1867 – 24 July 1908) was a Salvadoran poet.

Born in Apopa, Acosta published various diaries and papers, notably Diario del Salvador, La juventud salvadoreña, La república de Centro América, and El Fígaro. He was active in the newspaper La Unión, in which he signed under the pseudonym Flirt. At the time of the coup d'état of the Antonio brothers and Carlos Ezeta in 1890, Acosta was forced to flee from the country and did not return until it ended in 1894.

In 1904, he was founding director of La Quincena, an important cultural and scientific journal of the time. He participated with such people as Francisco Gavidia, Santiago I. Barberena and cousin of the writer, Arthur Ambrogi. According to David Escobar Galindo, Acosta was "one with romantic impulse, but soon found it better to write in modernism. He was modernist in two slopes: cosmic-metaphysics and vernacular". Francisco Gavidia mentioned Acosta describing him as "a sweet poet, of great descriptive dowries".

He died in 1908 in Tegucigalpa and collections of his poems were published after his death. An anthology was released in 1924.

== Poetry ==
A poetry extract from El Platanar (1924): EL PLATANAR

Impasible y compacto regimiento,
tendido en las cañadas laderas,
luce el bosque triunfal de sus banderas,
que en sus manos alegre agita el viento.

Convidando al amable esparcimiento
están las verdes matas altaneras,
que se cargan de frutas tempraneras,
del encendido trópico al aliento.

Un sol canicular deja teñido
el verde platanar con tintas rojas
en el lienzo del aire estremecido.

Mientras, buscando alivio a sus congojas,
el rudo caporal duerme rendido
al plácido susurro de las hojas.

De “Poesías Selectas", San Salvador, 1924.

== Selected works ==
- La Lira Joven, poetry, San Salvador, 1890.
- Poesías (publication), San Salvador, 1899.
- Poesías Selectas (poetry anthology), San Salvador, 1924.
