= Alberto Masferrer =

Salvadoran diplomat (1868–1932)

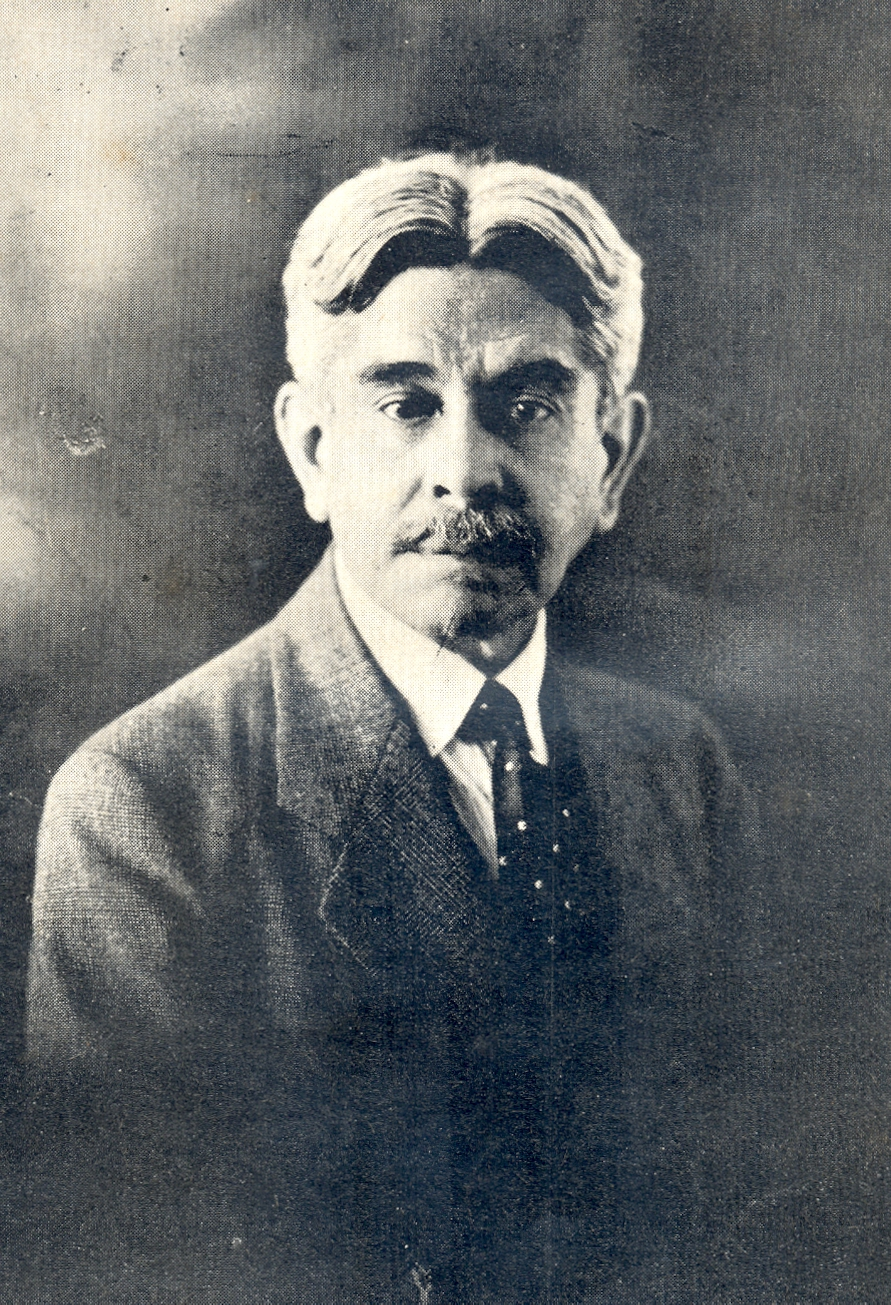
- Masferrer in 1920

Deputy of the Legislative Assembly of El Salvador from Usulután
- In office 1 March 1931 – 14 August 1931

Personal details
- Born: Vicente Alberto Mónico Masferrer; 24 July 1868 Alegría, El Salvador
- Died: 15 May 1949 (aged 80) San Francisco, United States
- Party: Salvadoran Laborist Party
- Occupation: Author, editor, diplomat, professor, deputy president, teacher, journalist, publicist, politician
- Writing career
- Genre: Essayist and philosopher
- Literary movement: Vitalismo

Vicente Alberto Mónico Masferrer (24 July 1868 – 15 May 1949) was a Salvadoran essayist, philosopher, politician, and journalist best known for the development of the philosophy of 'Vital Minimum' or 'Vitalismo' in Spanish. He was born in Alegría, Usulután formerly Tecape, Usulután in El Salvador on 24 July 1868. He did not receive a formal education, instead claiming to have been educated by "the university of life," but he did travel widely, having lived in several Central American countries, as well as in Chile, New York, and several European nations. During his public career at the Ministry of Foreign Affairs of El Salvador, he served as an ambassador of El Salvador in Argentina, Chile, Costa Rica, and Belgium, and served as a professor in Guatemala, El Salvador, Honduras, Costa Rica, Chile, and Argentina. Having served in the government of President Arturo Araujo, he was sent into exile in Honduras by the dictatorship of General Maximiliano Hernández Martínez following the uprising of 1932 known as La Matanza, dying that same year on 8 September in the city of Tegucigalpa, Honduras. Masferrer was well respected throughout his life, having earned the praise of such major Salvadoran figures as Arturo Ambrogi, Miguel Ángel Espino, Claudia Lars, and Salarrué.

== Early life ==
Vicente Alberto Mónico Masferrer was born on 24 July 1868 in Tecapa (now Alegría), a municipality in the Usulután Department of El Salvador. He was born out of wedlock to Enrique Masferrer, an agriculturalist and former Salvadoran legislator, and Leonor Mónico. He began his primary education at a rural school of a French woman by the name of Agustina Charvín. Masferrer was later transferred to a different institute run by a Cuban, Hildebrando Martí. There, he openly criticized the usage of corporal punishment by his teachers, stating that the methods were "outdated" and part of a "Eurocentric curriculum" which, according to him, were far removed from life in El Salvador.

Following his continuous rebellious behavior at Martí's school, Masferrer's father moved both him and his younger half-brothers Eduardo and Enrique Masferrer Crespo to a boarding school in Guatemala. Masferrer ran away from the school shortly after arrival. Following his departure from the school, Masferrer spent the rest of his teenage years travelling through Honduras and Nicaragua, and later Guatemala and Costa Rica. He worked a number of jobs during this time, from selling bottled water in Chinandega, Nicaragua with his uncle Miguel Mónico, working as a stint at a prison at Ometepe, and of course, teaching.

The home in which he was born was owned by the Mejia family and is now a small museum. His education involved a mixture of both self-teaching and formal education. His love for reading led him to choose teaching as a career later on in life. Salvadoran writer and journalist Arturo Ambrogi once stated that "I have rarely seen a lecturer as tremendous as Alberto."

== Career ==
=== Writer ===
Masferrer became an editor for the Salvadoran newspaper El Día in 1923. In 1928, he, along with writers and journalists Alberto Guerra Trigueros and José Bernal, founded the Salvadoran newspaper Patria. Alberto was in charge of the editorial section, as well as a well-received column titled "Vivir." The University of El Salvador editorial would go on to publish the works of Masferrer thanks to Pedro Geoffroy Rivas, a poet and literary critic who compiled Masferrer's newspaper writings over the span of several years.

In addition to his popularity in El Salvador, Alberto Masferrer also gained a following in Chile for his humorous columns under the pen name "Lutrín" for both newspapers El Chileno, based in Santiago, and El Mercurio which was based in Valparaíso. In addition to these newspapers, he also published weekly works in newspapers such as La Reforma and The United Workers, as well as in magazines such as The Republic of Central America, Actualidades, Scientific Literary Bibliography, El Simiente, among others. He also worked as director of the Official Journal in 1892.

His writings brought light to the social issues in El Salvador and have been characterized by his demanding of minimum rights for every person through his beliefs of Vital Minimum or Vitalismo. He dignified human beings through the usage of mainly harsh words and engaging in controversy over socially accepted customs.

=== Teacher ===
Alberto Masferrer began working as Director of the School for Boys in San Rafael del Sur in the Nicaraguan department of Rivas. Noting the poverty of the area in which he found himself in, in addition to the economic situation at the time, he began to raise pigs in order to feed the poor and frequently gave away his own earnings to any unfortunate person who crossed his path.

Alberto Masferrer taught throughout Latin America in countries such as Guatemala, El Salvador, Honduras, Costa Rica, Chile and Argentina, having been named "teacher and director of Crowds" by Salvadoran poet Claudia Lars. Alberto Masferrer taught at the Salvadoran Language Academy in San Salvador

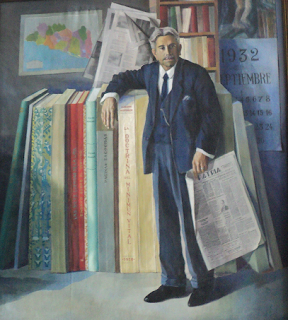
Portrait of Masferrer in the national library in San Salvador.

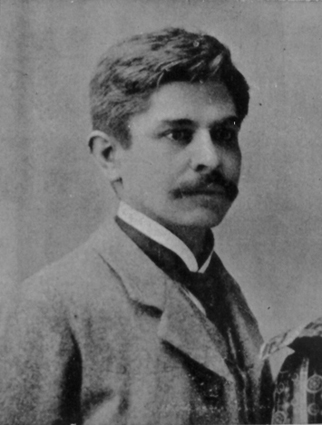
Masferrer at the Salvadoran Consulate General in Belgium.

=== Career in politics ===
He began his political career as Consul of El Salvador in Argentina (1901) and later in Chile (1902), Costa Rica (1907) and Belgium (1910). Following his consulate work, he was employed at the International Court of Justice in the year 1912.

Secretary of the National Institute (1890) and Advisor to the Ministry of Education (1916). Under the basic premise of the peaceful struggle for the rights of each individual, Masferrer became the ideologue and political campaign manager for the future president, the engineer Arturo Araujo in 1930. Masferrer was elected as a deputy to the Legislative Assembly of El Salvador from Usulutánjust a year later in 1931. He became a member of Araujo's Salvadoran Laborist Party, but soon resigned from office on 14 August 1931 due to his dissatisfaction with Araujo's presidency.

Despite his opposition to the arrival to the presidency of Brigadier General Maximiliano Hernández Martínez, the military takeover was inevitable. Since then, Masferrer tried to contain the violence unleashed months later at the hands of Martínez, in La Matanza, which resulted in the deaths of thousands of natives and peasants, resulting in Masferrer's exile to Honduras. His relationship with the Communist Party of El Salvador is unclear, although there are references about the pacifistic influence that he as a writer, tried, although failed.

== Vital Minimum ==
Vital Minimum or Vitalismo was a philosophical theory developed by Masferrer in several of his essays, particularly "El Mínimum Vital." This philosophy espouses the idea that all individuals, regardless of sex, race or class have the right to a basic standard of life, through equal access to education, employment, food, and shelter. Through this philosophy, Masferrer also argued for pacifism, influenced by the efforts of Mahatma Gandhi. The ideas of vital minimum echoes through many of Masferrer's essays, as well as in his novella Una Vida en el Cine(1922).

== Reception ==
Masferrer was, like many intellectuals, critiqued by many. The left in El Salvador would attack him, labelling him a "demagogue," "traitor" and a "right-wing socialist." Unsurprisingly, he also received a lot of criticism from El Salvador's right-wing, often being referred to as a Bolshevik, "criminal agitator" and subversive.

== Death ==
Masferrer died on 15 May 1949 in San Salvador, El Salvador.

== Partial bibliography ==
- ¿Qué debemos saber? (essay, 1913)
- Leer y escribir (essay, 1915)
- Una vida en el cine (novella, 1922)
- Ensayo sobre el destino (essay, 1925)
- Las siete cuerdas de la lira (essay, 1926)
- El dinero maldito (essay, 1927)
- Helios (essay, 1928)
- La religión universal (essay, 1928)
- El minimum vital (essay, 1929)
- Estudios y figuraciones de la vida de Jesús (essay, 1930)

The most complete selection of Masferrer's works is the 3 volume collection Obras de Alberto Masferrer. San Salvador: Universidad Autónoma de El Salvador, 1951.
