= Pedro Geoffroy Rivas =

Salvadoran anthropologist, poet, and linguist

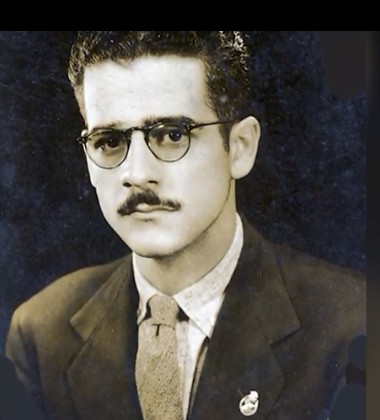
- Born: 16 September 1908; San Salvador, El Salvador
- Died: 10 November 1979 (aged 71); San Salvador, El Salvador
- Education: National Autonomous University of Mexico

Pedro Geoffroy Rivas (16 September 1908 - 10 November 1979) was an anthropologist, poet, and linguist.

His poetic work marked a landmark in Salvadoran poetic development. A rebellious, individualistic poet, Rivas incorporated in his poetry the freedom to express himself openly without fear of ordinariness or anthropocentric turns. Rivas and Oswaldo Escobar Velado are known as the founders of the modern protest poetry of El Salvador. Rivas was a member of Mexican Communist Party and Salvadoran Communist Party in the 1930s. His work influenced Pablo Neruda.

== Education ==
Rivas studied Anthropology Mexico at the University of New Mexico and obtained his master's degree from the university.

== Bibliography ==
=== Poetry ===
- Canciones en el viento (1933)
- Rumbo (1935)
- Para cantar mañana (1935)
- Solo Amor (1963)
- Yulcuicat (1965)
- Cuadernos del Exilio
- Los nietos del jaguar (1977)
- Vida, pasión y muerte del antihombre (1978)

=== Anthropology and Linguistics ===
- Toponimia náhuat de Cuscatlán (1961, corregida y aumentada 1973)
- El español que hablamos en El Salvador (1969 y 1975)
- El nawat de Cuscatlán - Apuntes para una gramática Tentativa (1969)
- Mi Alberto Masferrer (1953)
- La lengua salvadoreña (1978)
