= San Miguel, El Salvador =

San Miguel
- City
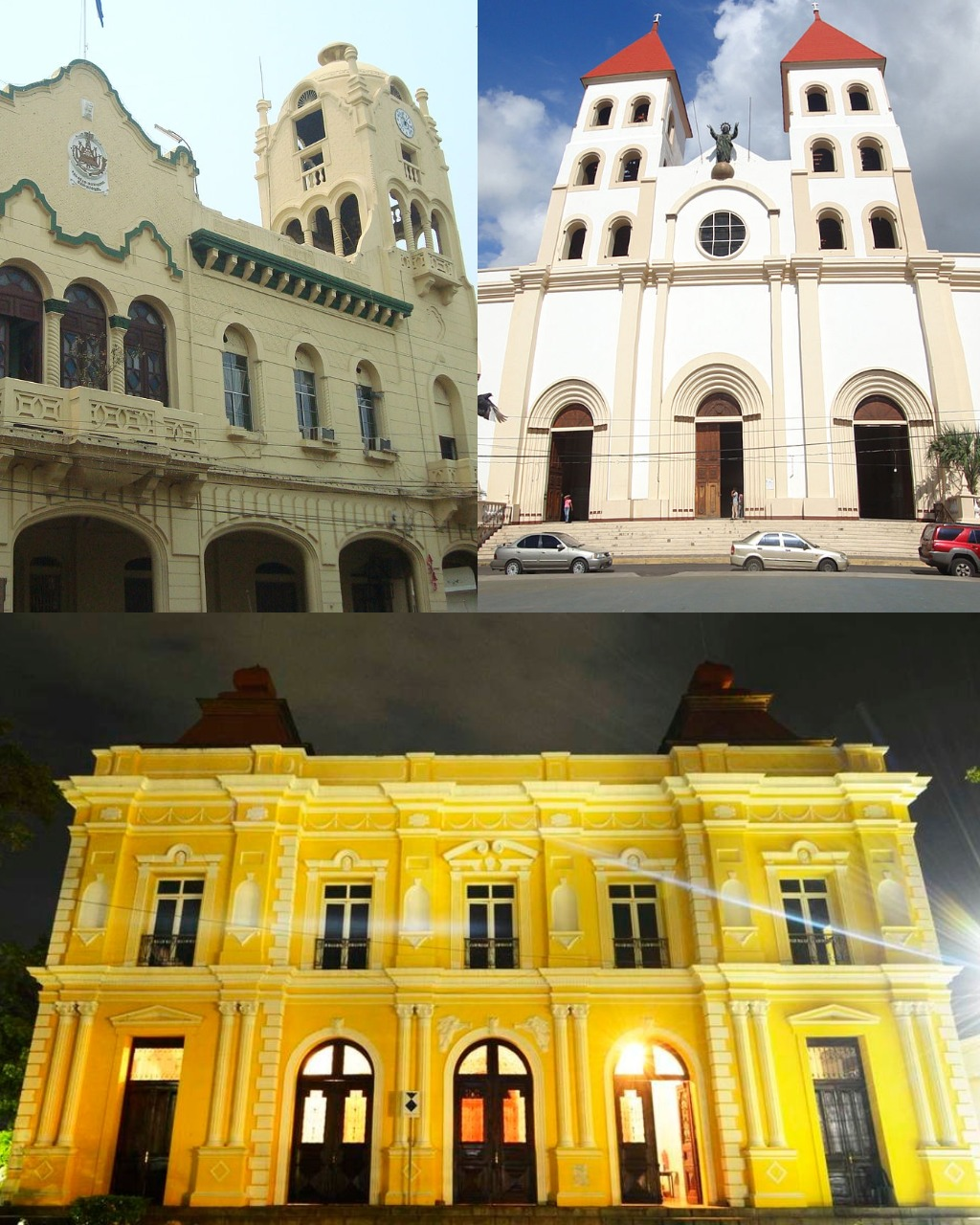
- From top, left to right: Municipal Hall of San Miguel, Cathedral Basilica of Queen of Peace, National Theater Francisco Gavidia

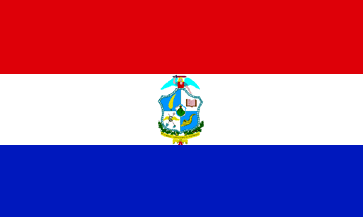
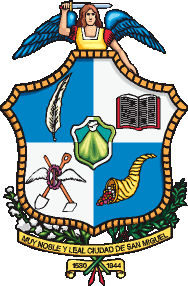
- Flag Coat of arms

- Location in El Salvador
- Coordinates: 13°28′53″N 88°10′39″W
- Country: El Salvador
- Department: San Miguel
- Founded: 1530

Government
  - Mayor: José Alexander Torres

Area
  - City: 593.98 km^{2} (229.34 sq mi)
- Elevation: 129 m (423 ft)

Population (2024)
  - City: 232,887
  - Rank: 3rd
  - Density: 392.08/km^{2} (1,015.5/sq mi)
  - Urban: 166,162
  - Metro: 330,000
  - Urban (District): 191,501
- SV-SM: CP 3301
- Website: Official website (in Spanish)

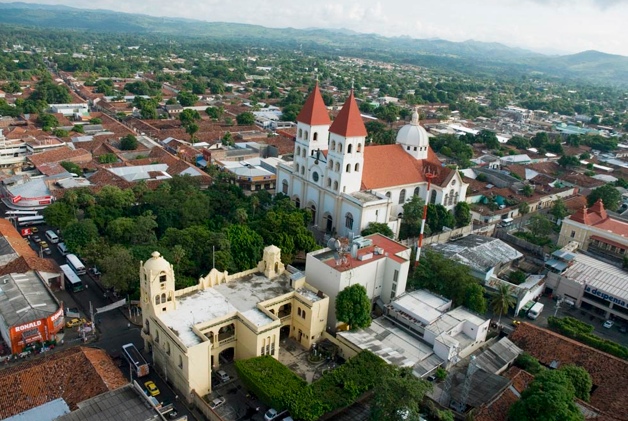
City of San Miguel from above

San Miguel (Spanish pronunciation: [ˈsam miˈɣel]) is a city in eastern El Salvador. It is the country's third most populous city. It is located 138 km (86 mi) east of the capital, San Salvador. It is also the capital of the department of San Miguel and a municipality. The population of the city in 2024 was 290,612.

== History ==
Luis de Moscoso Alvarado established the village of San Miguel de la Frontera (Saint Michael of the Frontier) on May 8, 1530, as a bastion for the conquest of the Lenca kingdom of Chaparrastique (Place of Beautiful Orchids). By 1586 the village had obtained the title of city.

In 1655, a volcanic eruption almost destroyed the entire city. According to legend, the devastation was so severe that only an image of Mary in the parish church was spared.

On 8 February 1971, the last execution carried out by El Salvador took place in a football stadium in San Miguel. The prisoner was a convicted murderer named Victoriano Gómez Urrutia, who had been sentenced to death for the 1961 murders of a woman and her underage daughter.

== Economy ==
The city has been an important center of the agriculture, textile and chemical industries of El Salvador. Since the early 21st century, the services sector, especially health care and commerce, have increased considerably, resulting in significant private investments in hospitals and shopping malls within the city. This has usually been attributed partly to the high inflow of remittances (at least 35% of the total, which represents around 18% of the national GDP) that Salvadorans living abroad send to families in the eastern zone of the country.

The incomes and wealth of the eastern half of the country are expected to increase following new jobs and businesses associated with the development of the Puerto La Unión; it started operations in 2012.

== Education ==
There are many educational institutions within the city, private and public, including some of the oldest schools in the country. The main universities are the public University of El Salvador (with its Facultad Multidiciplinaria de Oriente), the private Universidad de Oriente (UNIVO), the Universidad Gerardo Barrios, the Universidad Modular Abierta, and the Universidad Dr. Andres Bello.

== Sports ==
The sports infrastructure of San Miguel has had significant development and modernization since the beginning of the past decade. The main sports centers are the national football stadium of "Juan Francisco Barraza", the "Polideportivo Don Bosco" and the Estadio Miguel Félix Charlaix stadium.

== Culture ==
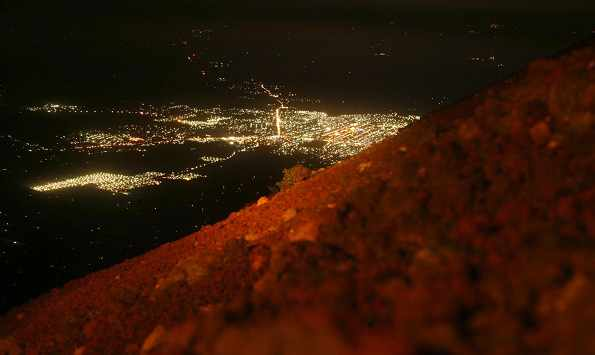
San Miguel at night

In November, San Miguel celebrates its municipal festivities in honor of "Nuestra Señora De La Paz" (Our Lady of Peace), the San Miguel Carnival being the final and main event that takes place on the last Saturday of the month. With an estimate of 1,000,000 people attending it for its 50th anniversary (as reported by the local media), it is considered the biggest entertainment, music and food festival in El Salvador and one of the largest in Central America. The beginnings of the Carnival itself date from 1959. Currently, this tradition continues to reflect the growth of the city and one of the motors for its economy.

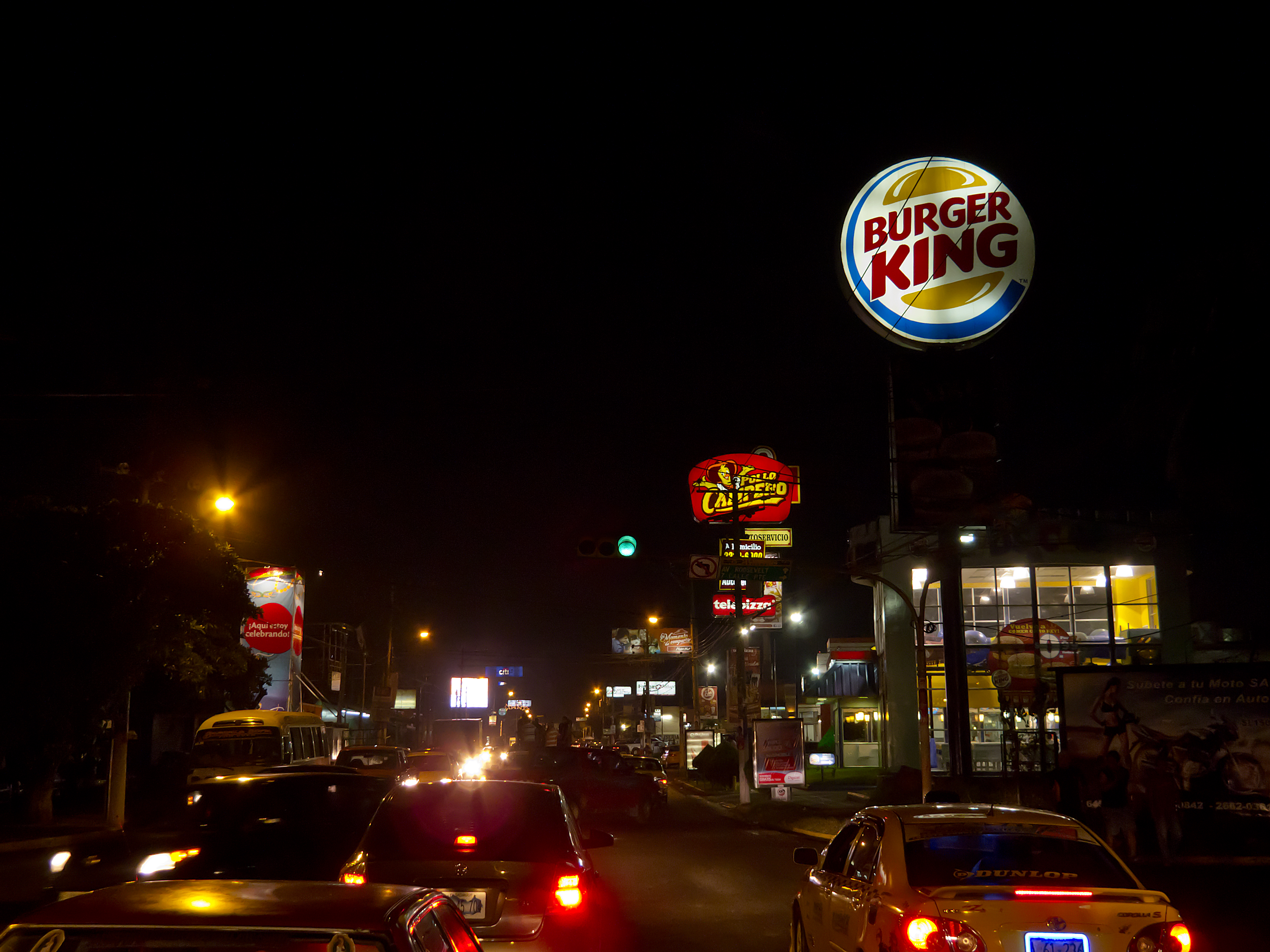
Roosevelt Avenue at night

San Miguel is famous for its night life along Roosevelt Avenue, the main thoroughfare that slices the city in half. One of those halves includes places of historical interest such as the Cathedral of "Nuestra Señora de la Paz" (1862), Guzman Park, Francisco Gavidia Theater (1909) and the Palacio Municipal (1935). The other half, modern San Miguel, includes new neighborhoods called "colonias."

Famous people born in San Miguel include Captain General Gerado Barrios, writer Francisco Gavidia, poet Juan J. Cañas, and David Joaquín Guzmán. The city is flanked by the Volcan Chaparrastique (2,129 meters), perhaps the most iconic image of San Miguel.

San Miguel is a sister city of Arlington, Virginia.

== Geography ==
The city is located 138 km east of the capital, San Salvador. The San Miguel Volcano or known as Volcán Chaparrastique is a stratovolcano, approximately 11 kilometres (6.8 mi) from the city. The volcano last erupted on November 16,2022.

=== Climate ===
Climate data for San Miguel, El Salvador (1991–2020)
Month	Jan	Feb	Mar	Apr	May	Jun	Jul	Aug	Sep	Oct	Nov	Dec	Year
Mean daily maximum °C (°F)	36.9 (98.4)	38.2 (100.8)	38.8 (101.8)	38.5 (101.3)	36.4 (97.5)	34.5 (94.1)	35.6 (96.1)	35.3 (95.5)	33.8 (92.8)	33.2 (91.8)	34.2 (93.6)	35.8 (96.4)	35.9 (96.6)
Daily mean °C (°F)	26.8 (80.2)	27.9 (82.2)	28.8 (83.8)	29.5 (85.1)	28.6 (83.5)	27.5 (81.5)	27.7 (81.9)	27.4 (81.3)	26.7 (80.1)	26.4 (79.5)	26.3 (79.3)	26.4 (79.5)	27.5 (81.5)
Mean daily minimum °C (°F)	19.2 (66.6)	19.7 (67.5)	21.3 (70.3)	23.2 (73.8)	23.8 (74.8)	23.2 (73.8)	22.6 (72.7)	22.7 (72.9)	22.7 (72.9)	22.5 (72.5)	21.1 (70.0)	19.6 (67.3)	21.8 (71.2)
Average precipitation mm (inches)	0.8 (0.03)	0.3 (0.01)	5.2 (0.20)	29.5 (1.16)	210.1 (8.27)	222.9 (8.78)	175.2 (6.90)	246.1 (9.69)	304.5 (11.99)	260.7 (10.26)	60.2 (2.37)	5.3 (0.21)	1,520.9 (59.88)
Average relative humidity (%)	61	59	59	64	74	80	76	79	84	84	76	67	71.9
Source: Ministerio de Medio Ambiente y Recursos Naturales

== Transportation ==
El Platanar Airport in the city of El Platanar, lies ten miles from San Miguel. Meanwhile, there is an airstrip in San Miguel with commercial air flights serving capabilities.

== Gallery ==
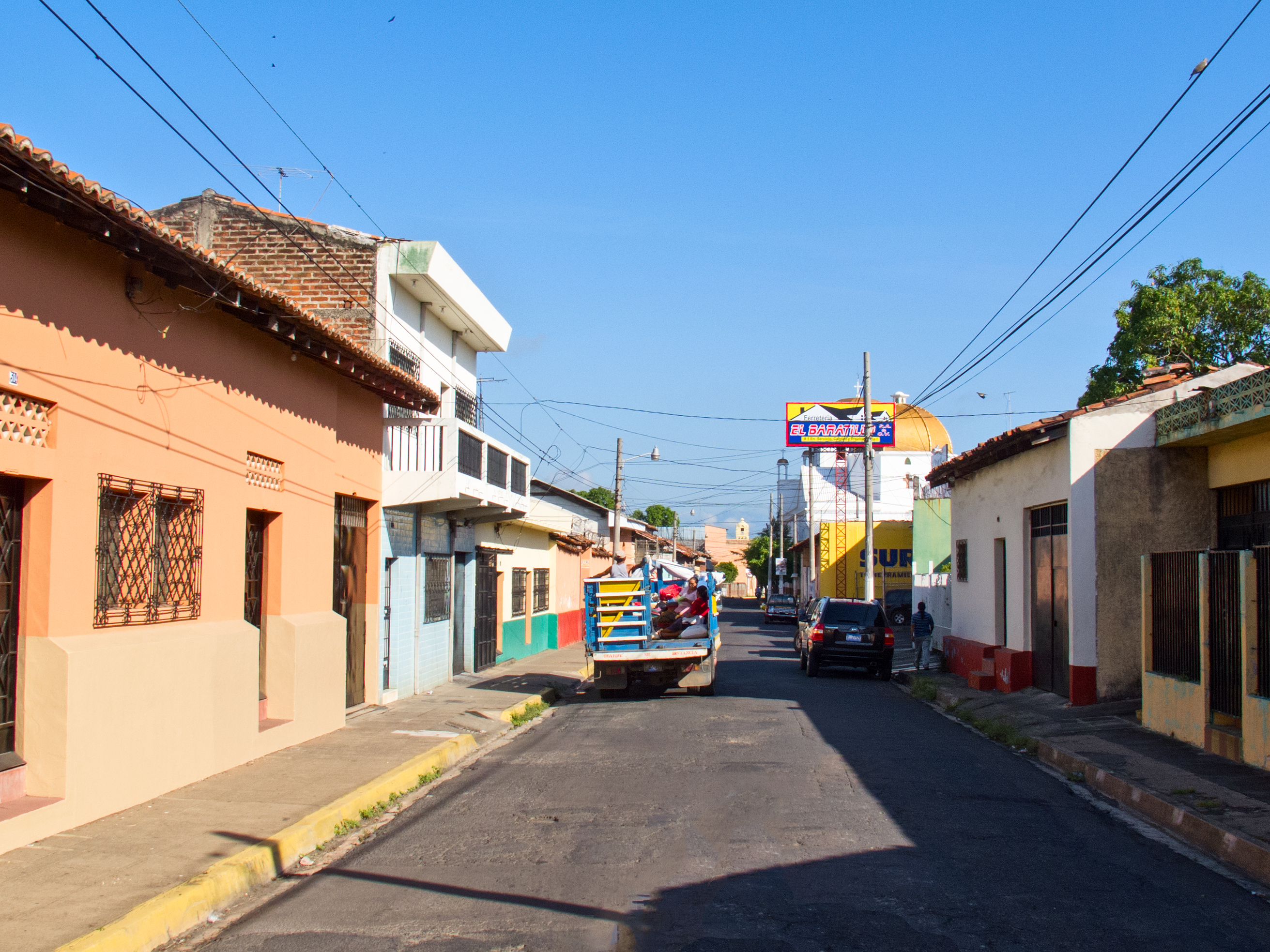
A street of San Miguel

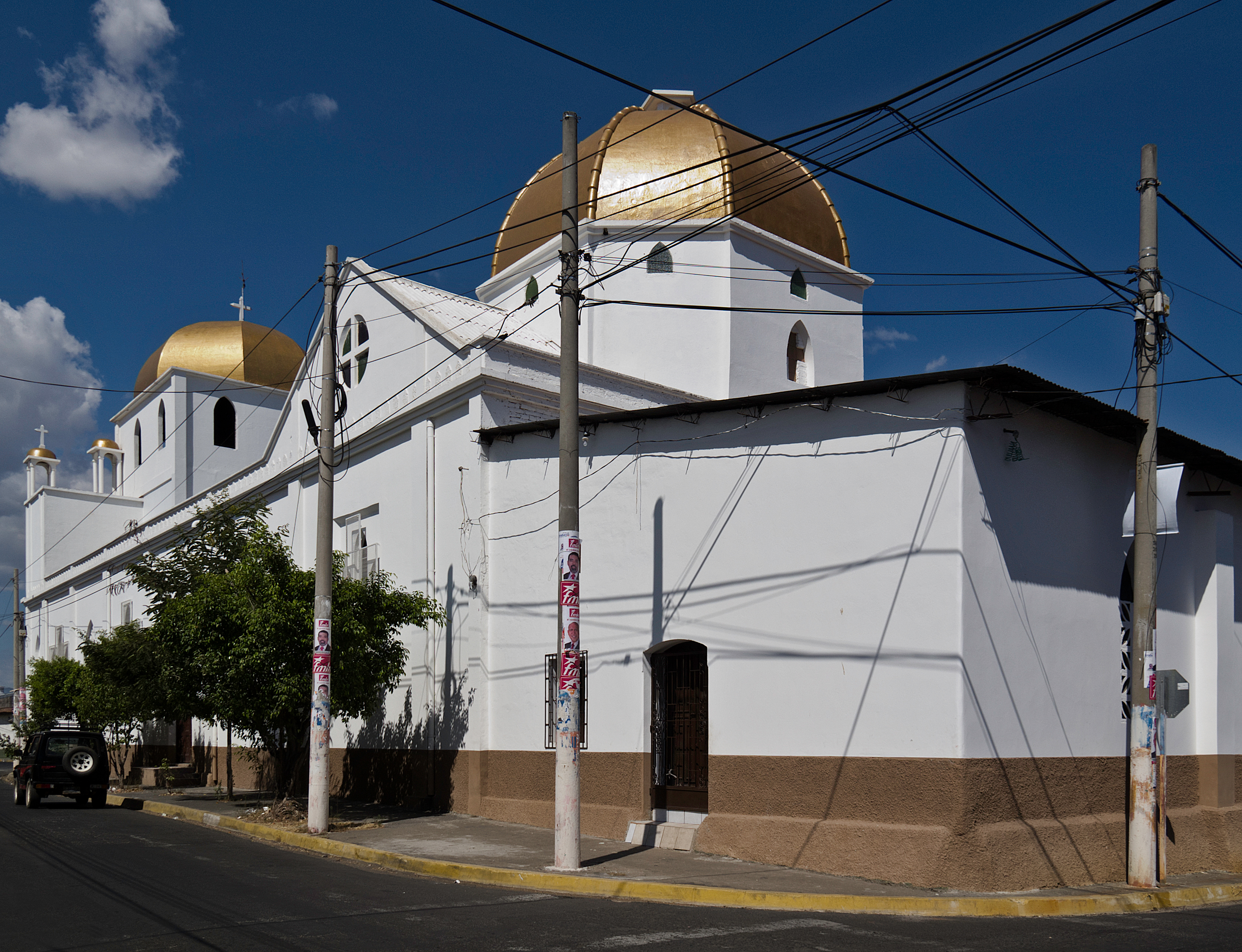
The El Calvario Catholic church in San Miguel

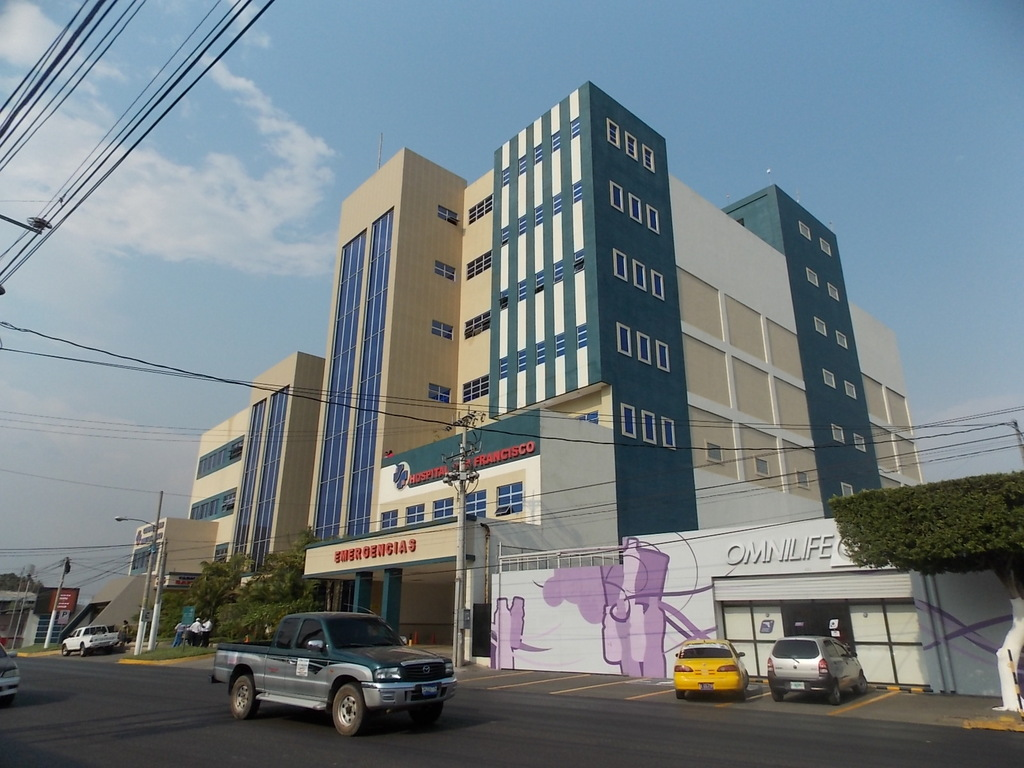
San Francisco Hospital in San Miguel

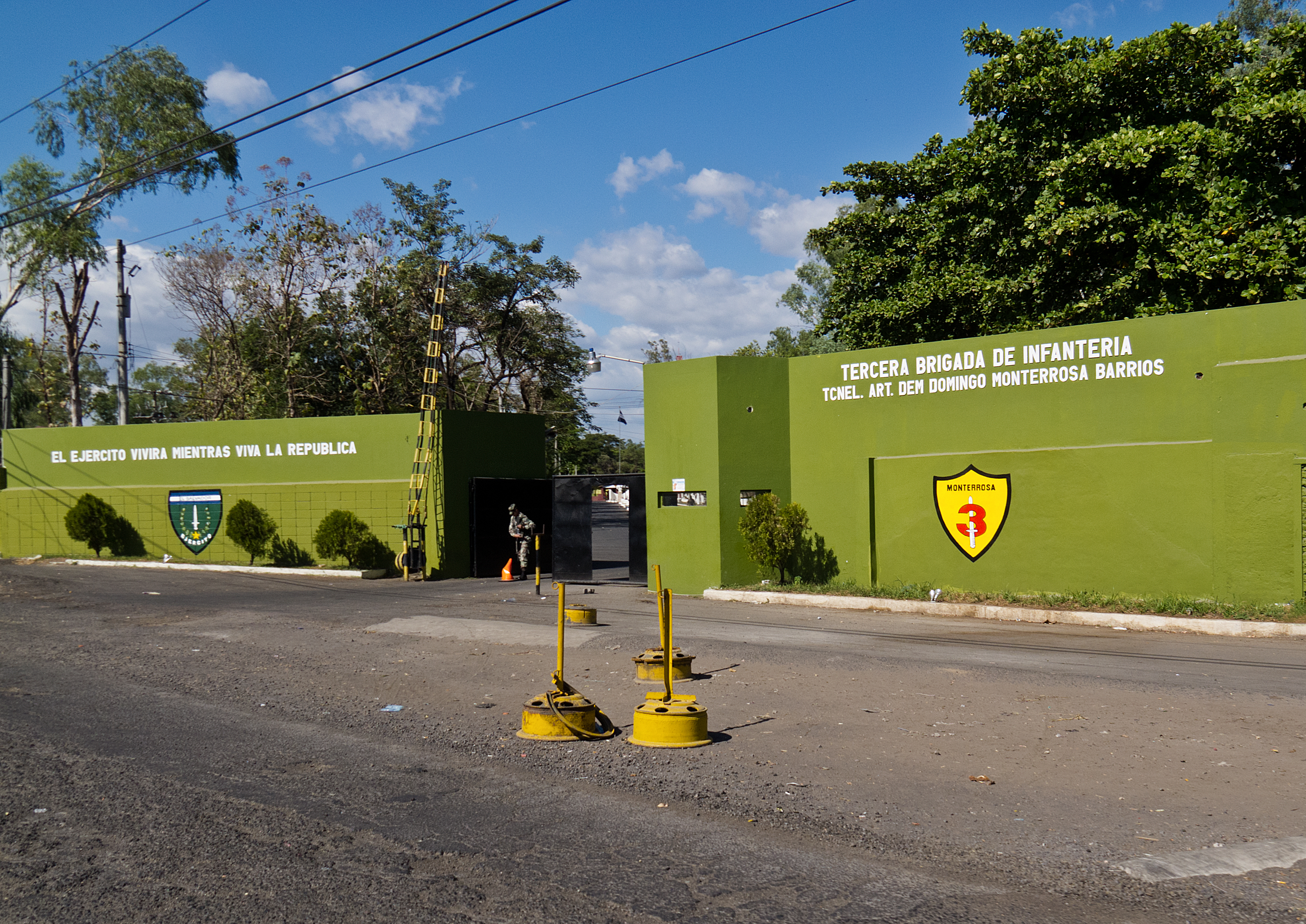
The Third Infantry Brigade's headquarters in San Miguel
