= José María Peralta Lagos =

Minister of Defense of El Salvador

General José María Peralta Lagos
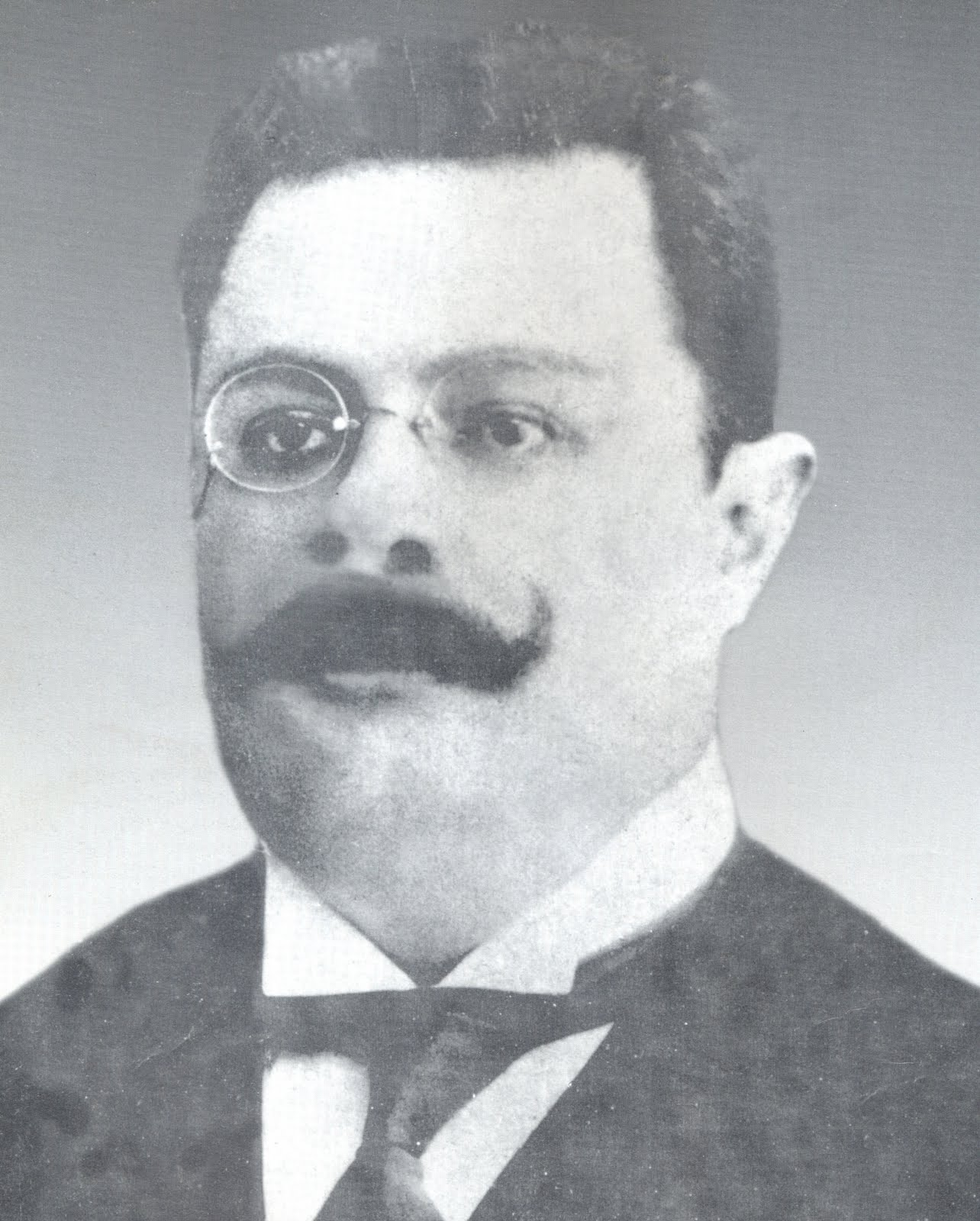

Minister of National Defense
- In office 1 March 1911 – 9 February 1913
- President: Manuel Enrique Araujo
- Preceded by: Fernando Figueroa
- Succeeded by: Luis Alonso Barahona

Personal details
- Born: 25 July 1873 Santa Tecla, El Salvador
- Died: 22 July 1944 (aged 70) Guatemala City, Guatemala
- Party: Independent
- Education: Academia de Ingenieros de Guadalajara
- Occupation: Writer, military engineer, politician

Military service
- Allegiance: El Salvador
- Branch/service: Salvadoran Army
- Years of service: ? – ?
- Rank: General

José María Peralta Lagos (25 July 1873 – 22 July 1944), was a Salvadoran writer, military engineer, and politician. He wrote under the pseudonym T.P. Mechín.

== Biography ==
Peralta Lagos was born on 25 July 1873 in Santa Tecla, El Salvador. He studied at the Academia de Ingenieros de Guadalajara, a military academy, in Guadalajara, Spain. He spearheaded the construction of the Teatro Nacional de El Salvador in the early 20th century, along with the engineer José Emilio Alcaine. He was a diplomatic representative of El Salvador in Spain and Minister of National Defense and Navy under president Manuel Enrique Araujo (1911–1913). He also served as a member of the Academia Salvadoreña de la Lengua.

Peralta Lagos's writing is costumbrista, is humorous, and is sometimes ironic.

Peralta Lagos had eight children including José María Peralta Salazar, who served as president of the parliament of El Salvador in the 1950s.

== Works ==
His published works are:

- Burla Burlando (collection of articles, 1923)
- La Muerte de la Tórtola o Malandanzas de Un Corresponsal (novel, 1932)
- Brochazos (short stories, 1925)
- Dr. Gonorreitigorrea (novel, 1926)
- Candidato (comedy in three acts, 1931)
- Masferrer Humorista (essay, 1933)
- Algunas Ideas Sobre la Futura Organización de la Enseñanza Superior de CA. (essay, 1936)
