= Sonsonate, El Salvador =

Sonsonate Villa de la Santísima Trinidad de Sonsonate
- District
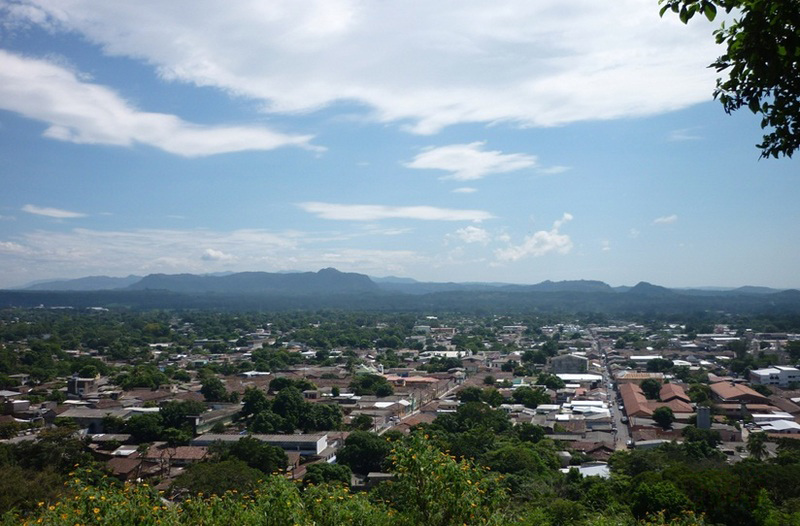
- Partial view of the city of Sonsonate from the top of the cemetery hill.

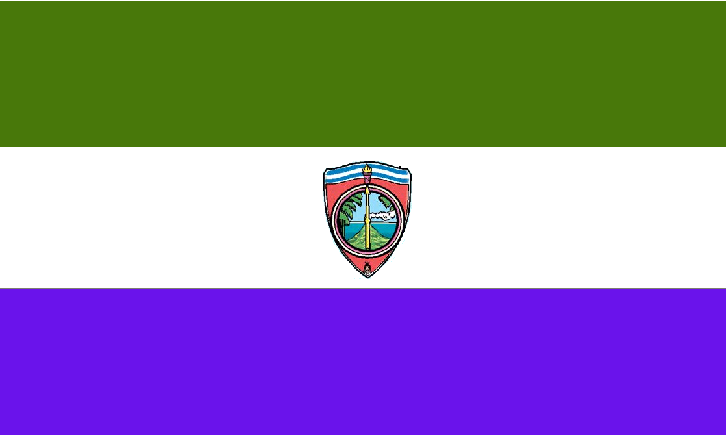
- Flag

- Location in El Salvador
- Coordinates: 13°43′N 89°43′W
- Country: El Salvador
- Department: Sonsonate
- Founded: 1524

Area
  - District: 232.53 km^{2} (89.78 sq mi)
- Elevation: 246 m (807 ft)

Population (2024 census)
  - District: 72,233
  - Rank: 8th in El Salvador; 3rd (Agglomeration)
  - Density: 310.64/km^{2} (804.55/sq mi)
  - Urban: 177,507
  - Seat/City: 65,153
- Time zone: UTC-6

Sonsonate (Spanish pronunciation: [sonsoˈnate]) is a city and district of El Salvador, of which it is also its municipal seat. It has an estimated population of 71,980 inhabitants for the year 2020. Sonsonate is the second most important city in western El Salvador. The town was founded under the name of "Villa del Espíritu Santo" on vacant lots near the town of los Izalcos in 1552. However, this foundation would be extremely ephemeral, because the following year, in 1553, this villa would be transferred to its current location, with the name of "Villa de la Santísima Trinidad de Sonsonate", in a cocoa-producing area. With the passage of time, the town would be known simply by the name of Sonsonate. This name was taken from the Rio Grande or Sonsonate in the Nahuat language, which crosses it from north to south across the entire plain until it flows into the Pacific Ocean. This was the third Spanish population founded in the territories that currently constitute El Salvador, although, it is worth clarifying, during the entire period of Spanish domination of America, Sonsonate was the capital of the Mayor's Office of Sonsonate, a territory apart from the one administered by San Salvador, today the capital of El Salvador.

On the other hand, one of the main cultural attractions of this city is the celebration of Holy Week, which is considered part of the religious heritage of the country, thus recognized by decree of the Legislative Assembly of El Salvador since 2013.

== Etymology ==
In the first historical reports on Sonsonate, reference was made to the fact that the city had taken the name of the Sensunat river, which was interpreted as "four hundred waters". Fray Francisco Vásquez, for his part, interpreted it as "four hundred eyes of water." For Santiago I. Barberena, the word is of Nahuat origin where Sentzunti means four hundred and At is water having its place name: Sentzunhat.

== Economy ==
Historically, the area was a producer of cotton. Most of the cotton produced, as of 1850, was retained for local use. Today, tobacco farming, cattle ranching and tourism (volcanos, coral reef) are important industries.
