= David Joaquín Guzmán =

Salvadoran scientist (1843–1927)

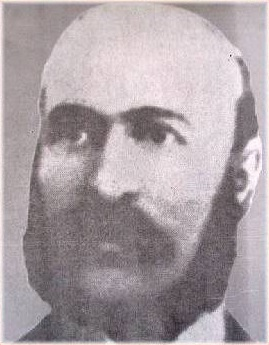
David Joaquín Guzmán

David Joaquín Guzmán (1843–1927) was a Salvadoran polymath, making contributions in science, and archeology, and as a museum curator and educator. He essentially founded and was first director of what is now known as the Museo Nacional de Antropología David J Guzmán, named in his honor. He also founded an anthropology museum in Nicaragua. He served in several positions in the government including being elected as representative to the Assembly.

== Early life and education ==
Born in San Miguel, El Salvador, David Joaquín Guzmán was the son of Joaquín Eufrasio Guzmán, briefly a President of El Salvador and a general, and his wife. In 1844 his father, then vice president, deposed Francisco Malespin, who had led the country to war against Guatemala. Much of the populace in the capital supported Guzman, who served out the remainder of the presidential term into 1845.

The younger Guzman earned a Bachelor of Philosophy from the University of San Carlos of Guatemala. During his university studies, he adopted the principles of European liberalism. In 1862, he travelled to Europe, and in 1869 he received the rank of Doctor of Medicine in Paris.

== Career ==
In 1870 Guzman returned to El Salvador. The following year he was chosen to represent the Constituent National Assembly, summoned by the then president Santiago González. His service in the Constituent Assembly in the capital was a short one.

He soon returned to San Miguel, where he dedicated himself to scientific research. He initiated a series of geological investigations. In addition, he undertook the botanical studies of classifying the flora and the fauna of the north of San Miguel and Chalatenango.

In 1872, Guzmán served under the cabinet of President González, as an Undersecretary of Public Instruction and Outer Relations. In 1874 he helped establish the Escuela de Artes y Oficios de San Salvador (School of Arts and Careers) in San Salvador. That same year, when treating the epidemic of smallpox in some areas of the country, Guzmán headed the state campaign of vaccination.

In 1875, Guzmán and Darío González organized an expedition of geological investigation into residues of the Los Frailes River, southwest of Ilobasco. During this exploration, they discovered fossils of mastodon.

Between 1881 and 1887, Guzmán worked as a university professor of medicine and botany at the University of El Salvador. On October 9, 1883, on the initiative of Guzmán, president Rafael Zaldívar opened the National Museum of El Salvador, to display the national collections related to archaeology, history and fine arts. Being responsible for its establishment and much of its content, Guzmán became the first director of the museum. He donated collections of Olmec and Maya art and artifacts.

In 1886 Guzmán returned to politics, elected deputy to the Constituent National Assembly summoned by Francisco Menéndez. In the Constituent Assembly, Guzmán promoted passage of legislation supporting the liberal principles adopted during his early European travels and studies.

In 1891, Guzmán travelled to Costa Rica to head a scientific expedition. Between 1896 and 1898, he resided in Nicaragua.

In 1916, Guzmán won a literary contest, summoned by the state under president Carlos Melendez, to create an Oration to the Salvadoran Flag.

During his life, Guzmán wrote journalistic poetry and articles that were compiled in various volumes. Most notably, his Chosen Works (Obras Escogidas) were published after his death.

== Legacy and honors ==
- The museum which he founded was named in his honor as the David J. Guzmán National Museum of Anthropology.
