= List of Salvadoran writers =

This is a list of Salvadoran writers, including novelists, short story writers, poets, and journalists.

- Claribel Alegría (born 1924)
- Arturo Ambrogi (1875–1936)
- Manlio Argueta (born 1935)
- Salvador Salazar Arrué (Salarrué) (1899–1975)
- José Roberto Cea (born 1939)
- Roque Dalton (1935–1975)
- Francisco Andrés Escobar (born 1942)
- Jacinta Escudos (born 1961)
- Alfredo Espino (1900–1928)
- Miguel Ángel Espino (1903–1967)
- Ana Margarita Gasteazoro (1950–1993)
- Francisco Gavidia (1863–1955)
- Claudia Hernández (born 1975)
- José María Peralta Lagos (1873–1944)
- Claudia Lars (1899–1974)
- Hugo Lindo (1917–1985)
- Alberto Masferrer (1868–1932)
- Nora Méndez (born 1969)
- Horacio Castellanos Moya (born 1957)
- Rafael Menjívar Ochoa (born 1959)
- Pedro Geoffroy Rivas (1908-1979)
- Juan Felipe Toruño (born 1898)
- Ítalo López Vallecillos (born 1932–1986)
- Roberto Armijo (1937–1997)
- Alfonso Quijada Urías (born 1940)
- Lilliam Armijo (born 1984)
- Miguel Álvarez Castro (1795–1856)
