= LGBTQ literature in El Salvador =

LGBTQ literature in El Salvador consists of literary works written by Salvadoran authors that involve plots, themes or characters that are part of or related to sexual diversity. Until the 21st century, El Salvador did not have its own tradition of LGBTQ literature, although there were some representations of themes related to sexual diversity in previous years. One of the oldest was the verse story "La corrección de menores", published in 1923 by humorist Francisco Herrera Velado, which tells the story of a boy who is raised as a woman and lives in constant transition between the two genders. A similar character later appeared in the novel ¡Justicia, señor gobernador! (1960), by Hugo Lindo.

In 2004 the collection of poems Injurias y otros poemas was published, by writer Ricardo Lindo Fuentes, and it is traditionally considered the first Salvadoran work with openly homoerotic themes. The publication of Injurias y otros poemas opened the door for several other LGBTQ works in subsequent years, including novels such as Ángeles caídos (2005), by Carlos Alberto Soriano, and Heterocity (2011), by Mauricio Orellana Suárez. The latter, in particular, was well received critically and was awarded the Mario Monteforte Toledo Central American Novel Prize. Other authors of LGBTQ works of notoriety include the storyteller Jacinta Escudos and poets such as Alberto López Serrano, Silvia Matus, Kenny Rodríguez and Marielos Olivos.

As for transgender literature, since the 1990s literary works with trans representation have become more common, although they have almost always been accompanied by tragic denouements, with death as the usual ending for these characters. This trend has continued up to the present day, with works including the novel El verbo J (2018), by Claudia Hernández, where an immigrant transgender woman experiences conditions of exclusion and violence for most of her life.

== Background ==
=== Nahuat-Pipil literature ===
As a result of the transcriptions of Pipil myths published by the German explorer Leonhard Schultze-Jena in 1930, there are literary depictions of same-sex sexual relations in the Náhuat-Pipil language. One example is the myth of "La boda del vagabundo," which tells the story of a father who decides to deceive his daughter's suitors by declaring that whoever could drink the water from a well until he could get a piece of cheese from the bottom could marry her. When a vagabond realizes that it was actually the reflection of the moon in the water, he decides to trick the father by opening a channel for the well to dry up. Overconfidence leads the father to promise that he would also turn himself in if the vagabond won, so when the watercourse dries up the well, he has no choice but to allow the vagabond to penetrate him through the anus, which causes him intense pain. The following day, the vagabond marries the daughter, who unlike her father, enjoys sex with him.

As can be seen in the story, rather than an act of sexual pleasure, anal penetration is shown as a form of humiliation of the defeated. This idea of domination on the basis of sex is repeated in other Pipil myths, where emasculation is a common way of exercising power over defeated men. Also notable is the fact that having sex with other men does not grant "homosexual" status to the vagabond or the father in the eyes of the daughter.

=== 20th century ===
Although not many works of Salvadoran literature during the 20th century are known to have explored themes related to sexual diversity, there are some exceptions. In 1923, the writer and humorist Francisco Herrera Velado published the work Mentiras y verdades, which recounts popular legends and anecdotes in verse. One of them is "La corrección de menores", where he tells the story of Luis/Luisa, a man who is raised as a girl and over the years lives in constant transition between both genders. Among his partners is a woman identified as a lesbian who takes on the role of "Romeo", while Luis becomes his "Juliet". Subsequently, Luis becomes a poet and decides to write the story of his "old life as a transvestite".

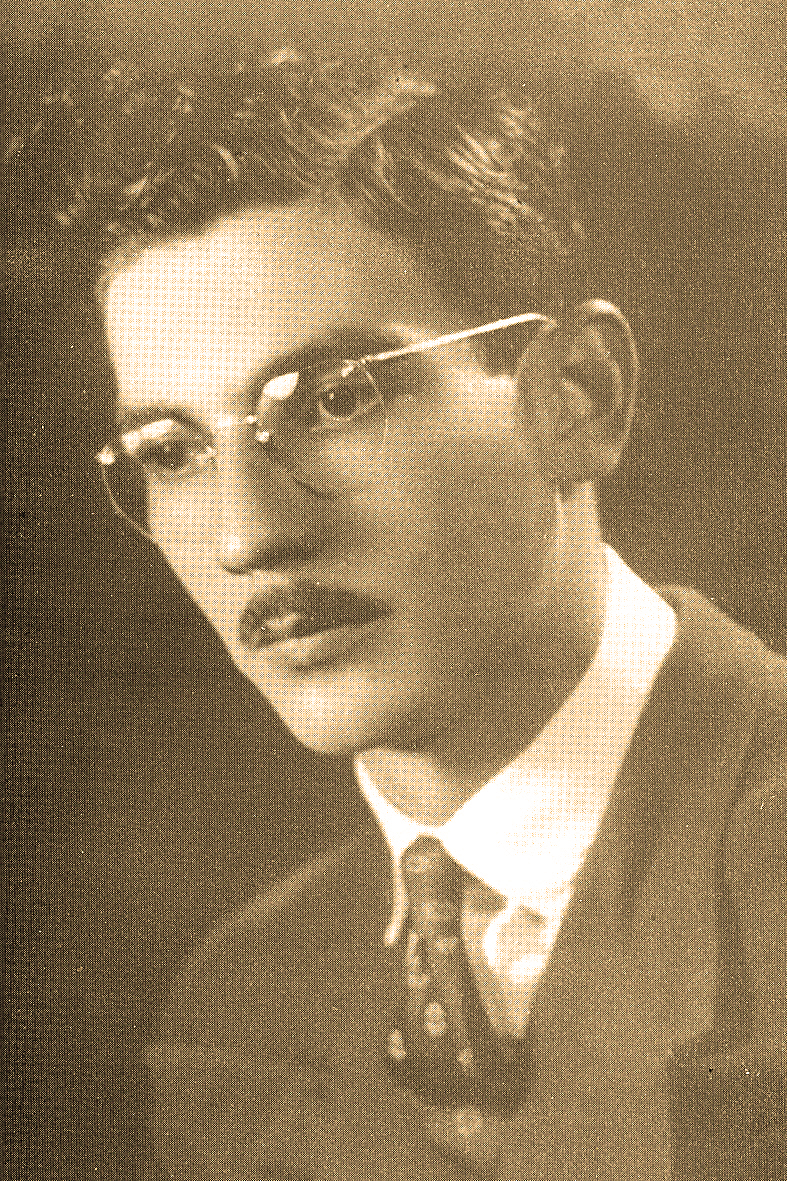
Hugo Lindo, author of the novel ¡Justicia, señor gobernador! (1960)

Another case of a male character who is raised as a woman is found in the novel ¡Justicia, señor gobernador!, published in 1960 by the writer Hugo Lindo. The work, which is considered a precursor of testimonial literature in El Salvador, tells the story of a trial in which a transvestite named Mercedes López Gámez is accused of rape and murder of a young woman. Through Mercedes' conversations with lawyer José Amenábar, the reader discovers that Mercedes was assigned male at birth, but that her mother had decided to raise her as a girl. Although in her village she enjoyed being treated as a woman and receiving compliments from men, upon moving to San Salvador she encounters a community in which "homosexuality does not exist," and the rage leads her to the act of sexist violence that results in the trial discussed in the novel.

It has also been mentioned as a precedent the novel Íngrimo (1970), by Salvador Salazar Arrué, which explores the construction of the identity of an adolescent boy who, at one point in the novel, states:

My true identity will be revealed, my secret of calling myself: Marta Cecilia de la Circuncisión de Sangamín, of being a young lady (...) if I have to go away it will be (so they all say) on condition of being "La Martina", "La Martita" or "Martita" (...) I have felt a little ashamed of being a man and of being so lonely (Íngrimo). I know that if I put on a woman's suit and heels and nylon stockings and everything, I'm going to change so suddenly that who knows what will happen.

A common characteristic in some Salvadorean Spanish-language works of the time is that, as in "La boda del vagabundo", anal penetration is shown as a symbol of humiliation towards other men. One case is found in the novel One Day of Life (1980), by Manlio Argueta, which includes a scene where a priest is sodomized with a stick by a group of soldiers as a form of domination. Transvestism is also used as a symbol of social degradation in some writings of the time, as in the memoirs of the guerrilla Alfonso Hernández, who recounts in a poetic tone a youth in San Salvador in which his friends disguised themselves as prostitutes to "satirize the dregs of society...".

== Narrative ==
After the end of El Salvador's Civil War in 1992, more representations of LGBTQ characters began to appear in narrative works, particularly of transgender women. However, several of these characters met tragic ends, as in the short story "Santiago, la Bellita" (1995), by writer René Rodas, whose protagonist, known as la Bellita, is murdered by one of her clients in the brothel where she served as a sex worker. The novel Putolión (1997), by David Hernández, is notorious for offering an overview of the spaces occupied by LGBTQ people during the second half of the twentieth century. The work recounts how, since the 1950s, a sector of San Salvador known as La Praviana was very popular among LGBTQ people, particularly those who worked as prostitutes. Because the novel suggested that an important figure in Salvadorean politics was homosexual, the publication of Putolión was controversial and the authorities pressured the publisher to withdraw all copies from circulation and destroy them shortly after their appearance.

In 1997, Jacinta Escudos published a book of short stories, Cuentos sucios, which included one of the first stories to explore lesbian attraction. In later years, Escudos entered into transgender literature with the stories "Memoria de Siam" (2008) and "Nights in Tunisia" (2010). In the case of "Memoria de Siam", Escudos took fantastic features to narrate the transformation that a woman undergoes to become a man to enter into a sentimental relationship with the woman she loves, although at the same time she reproduces traditional discourses on the roles of men and women. At the end of the story, the protagonist ends his transformation by exclaiming, "I like being a man.".

=== 21st century ===
The first Salvadorean novel with a gay protagonist was Más allá del horizonte (Beyond the horizon) (2002), by Julio Leiva, which tells the story of Salvador, a gay boy who decides to join the Farabundo Marti National Liberation Front during the time of the civil war. Salvador goes by the name of Jesus during his time in the guerrilla and when his comrades find out about his sexual orientation, they "promote" him to command in the front line of combat, as a way for him to be killed for his sexuality. Jesus manages to survive and, as a reward, he is sent to spy on an army colonel, but is captured and tortured. When his captors learn about his homosexuality, Jesús is victim of gang rape, but he does not confess to being part of the guerrilla.

In 2005, Carlos Alberto Soriano's novel Ángeles Caídos (Fallen Angels) was published. The plot of this work follows the story of Nicolás, Anselmo and Renato, three gay men living in a city that resembles San Salvador in the early 1990s. The novel also portrays the cases of extreme violence against trans women at the time, who in the plot are attacked by members of youth gangs and by unknown men who shoot them from vehicles. Some publications of the time continued to portray LGBTQ people in a pejorative way, such as the novel Cualquier forma de morir (2006), by Rafael Menjívar Ochoa, whose gay protagonist is described as "mentally ill" and a pedophile.

Shortly thereafter, the author Mauricio Orellana Suárez appeared, who in a period of three years published two novels with LGBTQ themes: Ciudad de Alado (2009) and Heterocity (2011). The latter won the Central American Mario Monteforte Toledo Novel Prize in its 2011 edition and emerged after discussions in the Legislative Assembly to ban same-sex marriage in the country. The novel is a critique of the heteronormative policies of the State, and explores the experiences of different LGBTQ people in El Salvador at the time, including Marvin Diez, a middle-class gay man who began having sexual experiences with other men at a young age and over the years must confront the prejudices his family has ingrained in him to accept his sexual orientation. Other characters include Adán, a young, lower-class gay man who is falsely accused of raping a child, Wally Vargas, a television host who is praised as the epitome of masculinity, but who secretly has sex with men, and Denis Farías, a congressman who has a gay brother and is trying to get the Legislative Assembly to pass a constitutional amendment to legalize Equal Marriage.

In recent years, narratives with transgender characters have continued to focus on stories with tragic endings. One example is the short story "La Pedrina", published in 2007 by Francisco Andrés Escobar and inspired by the real story of a well-known transgender woman of the same name in the city of Santa Ana. Unlike the real character, who died at age 85 of cardiorespiratory arrest, the Pedrina of the story ends up committing suicide after the death of her mother, not to mention that the end of the story has a transphobic connotation by emphasizing the genitals of the deceased. Another example is the story "Johnny-Luz" (2018), by Mauricio Orellana Suárez, which tells the story of a trans woman who ends up being murdered by her own father. In 2018, writer Claudia Hernández published the novel El verbo J, which has as its protagonist a transgender woman from a lower social class who leaves El Salvador to emigrate to the United States. During her passage through Mexico, the protagonist is kidnapped and turned into a sex slave, but manages to escape and arrive at her destination. However, she later becomes infected with HIV and does not follow the proper treatment, so that over the years the disease progresses and by the end of the novel it is assumed that she is close to death.

== Poetry ==
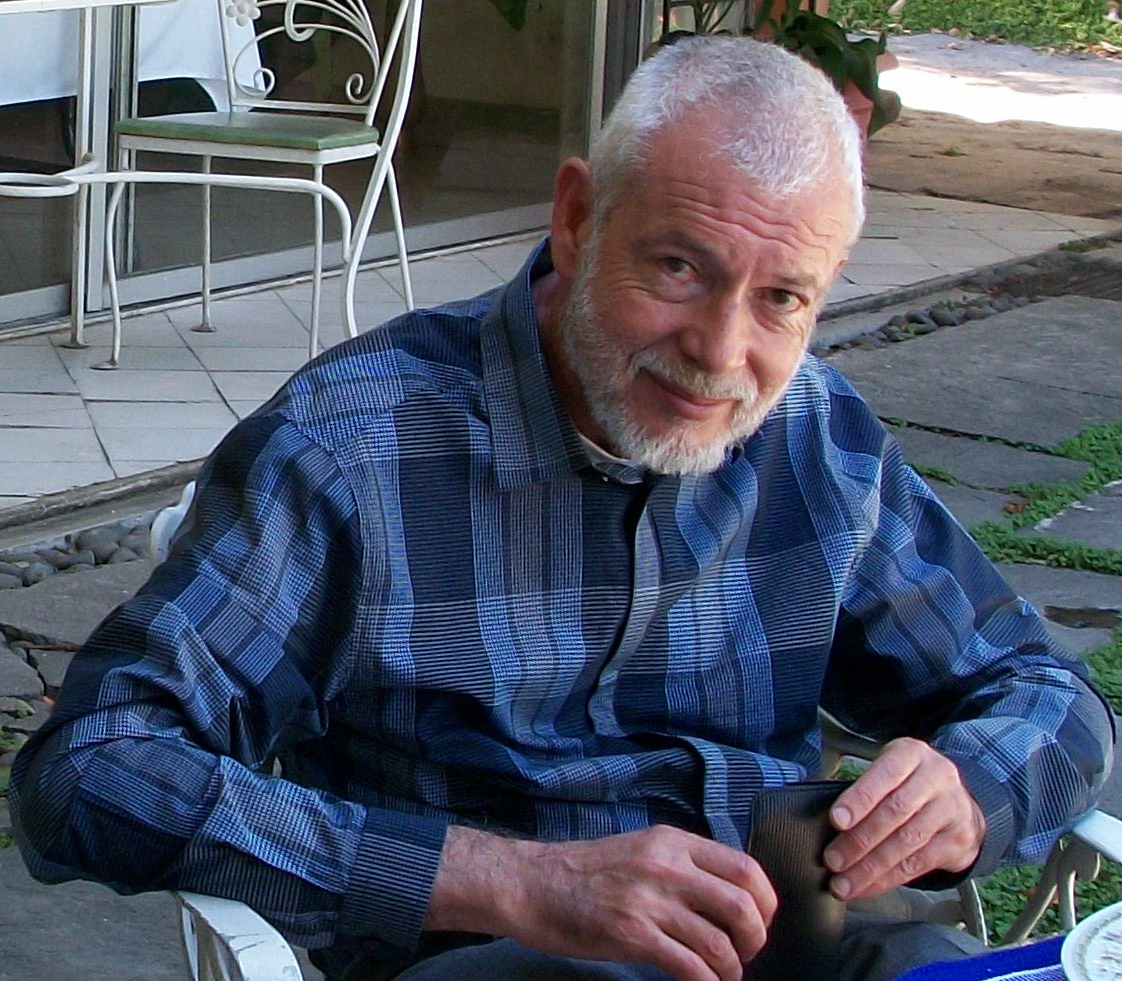
Ricardo Lindo Fuentes in 2009.

The first Salvadorean literary work with openly LGBTQ themes was the collection of poems Injurias y otros poemas, published by the writer Ricardo Lindo Fuentes in May 2004. The work marked Lindo's public coming out, and he stated that he had written the book as a protest against the exclusion of homosexuals in El Salvador. Injurias y otros poemas also represented a break with the Salvadoran poetry of the time, which had traditionally avoided touching on topics considered taboo. An example of these themes can be seen in the following fragment of a poem from the book entitled "El sacrificio" (The sacrifice):

You said, serpent: ....
"Let one woman join another one in a nest,
let one man caress another,
perverse it is, and vicious."
But that is not true.
Every form of love, if with love is exerted
is in God and with in God. ...
And it is possible to be gay
and live a spiritual life
without there being any contradiction in it.

The following year, in 2005, the collection of poems La fiera de un ángel, by René Chacón, appeared, which followed in the poetic footsteps initiated by Lindo. Lindo himself published a second book of poetry with LGBTQ themes in 2010, entitled Bello amigo, atardece....

Another recognized writer of LGBTQ poetry is Alberto López Serrano, with works such as Y qué imposible no llamarte ingle (2011) and in particular with Cantos para mis muchachos (2014). This poetry book was presented in several Central American countries and provoked homophobic attacks on social networks after being promoted by the National Autonomous University of Honduras. One of the main characteristics of this collection of poems is the references to Greek myths.

Lesbian poetry has also had several representatives in the country, including writers Silvia Matus, Kenny Rodríguez and Marielos Olivos. A similarity between the poetry of Matus and Olivos is their commitment to social denunciation, which is explained by the fact that both have had a long history of activism in feminist organizations. Matu's poetry also explores the female body as the origin of love, as can be seen in the following fragment of the poem "Amar a otra mujer" (Loving another woman):

Loving another woman
is the opening to infinity
the mystery of the ocean
the delicacy of the rose
and it is also...
to be exposed and fragile.

== See also ==
- LGBTQ rights in El Salvador
- Equal marriage in El Salvador
- Literature in El Salvador
- LGBTQ literature in Argentina
- LGBTQ literature in Colombia
- LGBTQ literature in Ecuador
- LGBTQ literature in Mexico
- LGBTQ literature in Spain
- Bengali Queer Literature

== Bibliography ==
- Arévalo, Amaral (2022). «¿El asesinato como destino? Identidades trans en narrativas de la postguerra salvadoreña 1992–2021». Whatever. A Transdisciplinary Journal of Queer Theories and Studies. Accessed on September 5, 2022.
- Borja, Luis (2021). La voz del otro: Aproximacièn al discurso homoerótico en la poesía salvadoreña. Accessed on September 4, 2022.
- Chacón, Josué (2017). La transexualidad y la construcción de roles de género en los personajes de los cuentos “Memoria de Siam” y “Nights in Tunisia” de Jacinta Escudos. San Salvador. Archived from the original on September 5, 2022. Accessed on September 5, 2022.
- Lara Martínez, Rafael (2012). I ndígena, cuerpo y sexualidad en la literatura salvadoreña. El Salvador: Editorial Universidad Don Bosco. Accessed on September 4, 2022.
- Velásquez, Antonio (2015). «Miradas sobre la representación de la homosexualidad en la literatura centroamericana y el caso de Trágame tierra». The Latin Americanist 59 (2): 51–66. ISSN 1557-203X. Accessed on September 5, 2022.
