= Committed Generation =

Literary movement in El Salvador

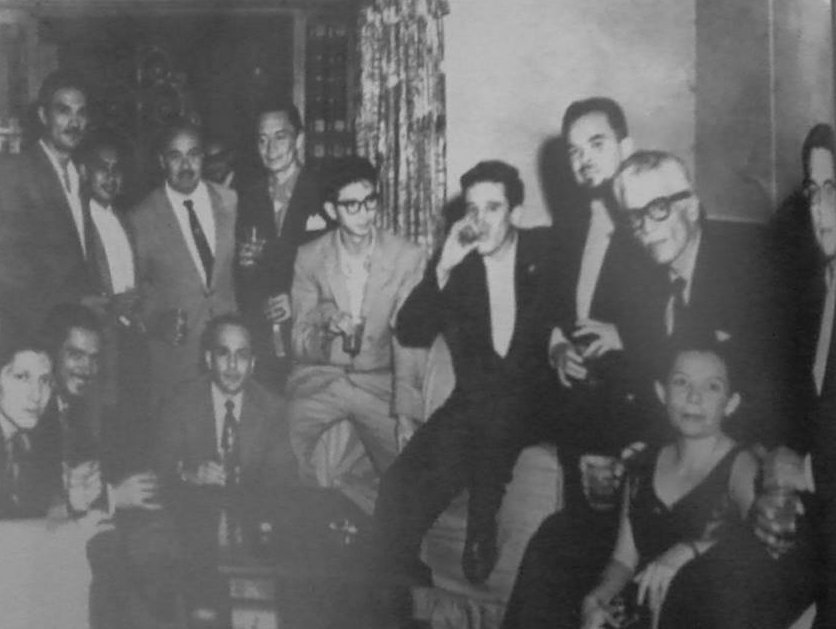
Salvadoran poet Roque Dalton fifth from right to left with intellectuals from the Committed Generation (University Literary Circle). San Salvador, 1961

The Committed Generation (la Generación Comprometida in Spanish) was a literary generation that emerged in El Salvador during the 1950s, in which writers from various Latin American countries lived in El Salvador in exile or for diplomatic reasons. Among them are Otto René Castillo and Miguel Ángel Asturias from Guatemala, Guillermo Calderón Puig from Honduras, Rigoberto López Pérez from Nicaragua, Manuel Mejía Vallejo from Colombia and Darío Cossier from Argentina, among others.

The name "Committed" (Comprometida) was coined by the poet Ítalo López Vallecillos, influenced by Sartrean thought. It had two stages: the first, with the founding nucleus, made up of López Vallecillos himself, Irma Lanzas, Waldo Chávez Velasco, Álvaro Menen Desleal, Eugenio Martínez Orantes and others. The second, with the emergence in 1956 of the Círculo Literario Universitario, founded in the Faculty of Law of the University of El Salvador.

The Circle integrated the poets Roque Dalton, Roberto Armijo, José Roberto Cea, Manlio Argueta and Tirso Canales. Armijo, Cea, Argueta, Canales, and the poet Alfonso Quijada Urías directed, during the 1960s until 1979, the cultural magazine entitled La Pájara Pinta.

The Committed Generation influenced subsequent literary promotions, both for its desire to delve into Salvadoran reality, and for its search for aesthetic renewal, which had the most heterogeneous concretions: from science fiction and the theater of the absurd by Álvaro Menéndez Leal, going through the poetic renewal of Roque Dalton, to the indigenism and popular tone of José Roberto Cea.

== Members of the Committed Generation ==
- Álvaro Menéndez Leal (also known as Álvaro Menen Desleal)
- Oswaldo Escobar Velado
- José René Arteaga Rebollo
- Ítalo López Vallecillos
- Waldo Chávez Velasco
- Irma Spears
- Eugenio Martinez Orantes
- Ricardo Bogrand
- Armando López Muñoz
- Mercedes Durand
- Roque Dalton
- Manlio Argueta
- Jose Roberto Cea
- Roberto Armijo
- Tirso Canales
- Miguel Angel Parada

Some authors include within this Generation the painter Camilo Minero and the writers Alfonso Quijada Urías and Ricardo Castrorrivas.

== See also ==
- Juan Felipe Toruño
