= Juan Felipe Toruño =

Nicaraguan poet and literary critic

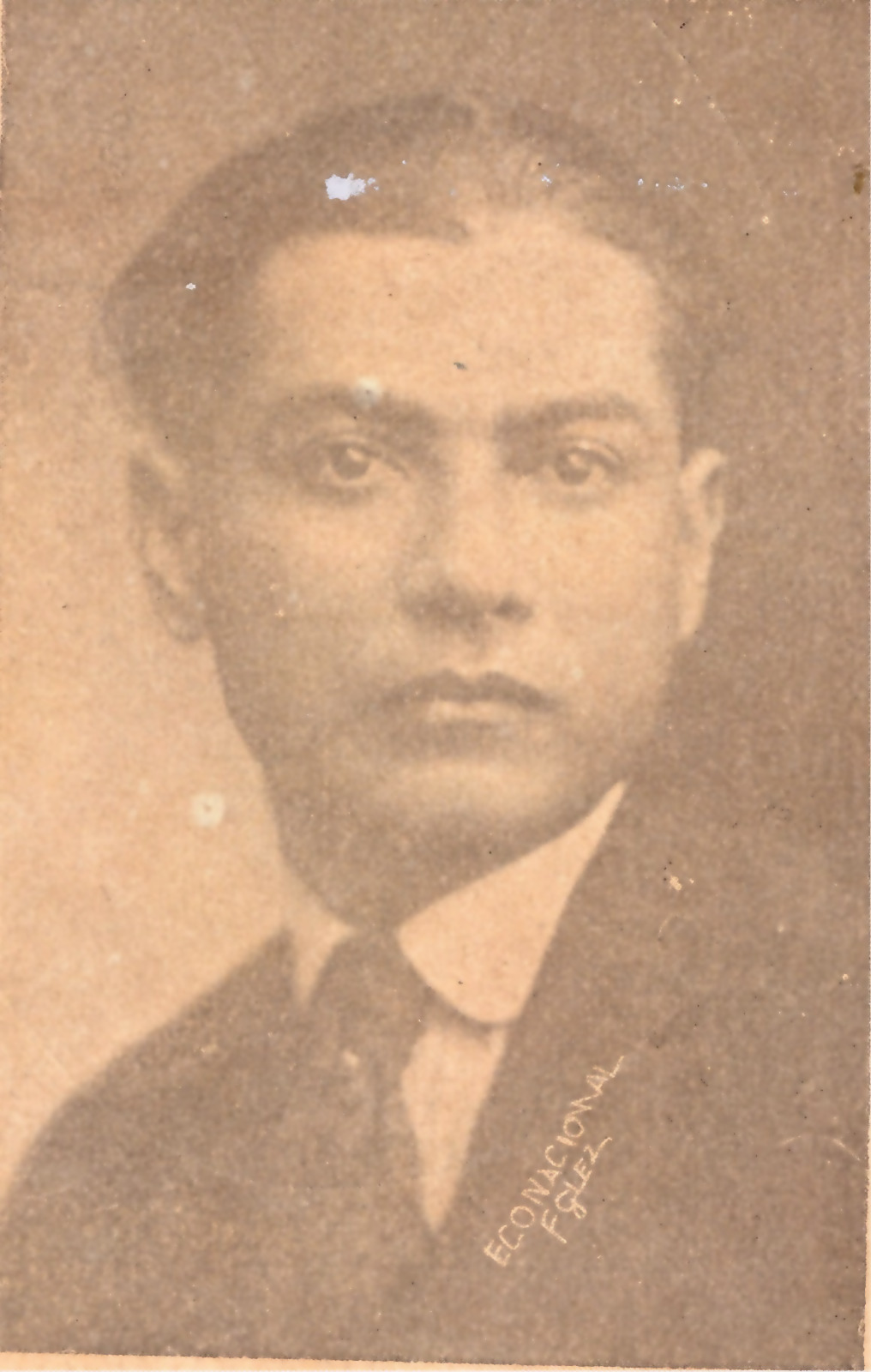

Juan Felipe Toruño (León, Nicaragua, May 1, 1898 – San Salvador, El Salvador, August 31, 1980) was a prolific Nicaraguan journalist and teacher who spent most of his life in El Salvador. His literary output included poetry, novels, literary criticism, and articles on the history of Central American literature.

== Early life ==
At the age of twelve, Toruño left the Christian Brothers of San Juan Bautista school in his birth city of León to work as a teacher in Posoltega, Nicaragua.

In 1910 he joined the army to defend the liberal presidency of José Madriz, who was eventually exiled to Mexico. Madriz was replaced by Juan José Estrada Morales, a military leader of the liberal-conservative alliance, supported by the United States. After the liberal defeat, Toruño, who was still a minor at the time, was forced to flee to the Cordillera de los Maribios mountains of Nicaragua for several months. He drank water from ponds, ate leaves and fruits, and returned to León "barefoot and in rags."

In 1917 he apprenticed for a shoemaker. In 1916 he attended the funeral of Rubén Darío, and the solemnity of the event made an impression on him. Toruño was influenced by Darío, who was known as the founder of Modernismo. He began writing poetry at this time, although these early poems have been lost to posterity. He began his journalism career in 1918 at Eco Nacional, where he first published his poetry.

== Moving abroad ==
Toruño founded a literary magazine called Darío in 1919, which he sold in 1923 after publishing 69 editions. He had planned to go to Havana, Cuba, where he was offered work in El Fígaro. However, a storm prevented his ship from sailing, so he settled in El Salvador instead. In 1925 he found work as a journalist, first in the newspaper Diario de El Salvador, and later in El Día and the magazine La Semana. In 1925 he became an editor of Diario Latino, where he worked until 1973, with the exception of 1928-1929, when he went to Ahuachapán, where he worked at a different newspaper.

His literary career took off in 1930, and in 1932 he spearheaded a Saturday literary supplement called Sábados de Diario Latino, which he maintained for fifty years, promoting the careers of numerous writers. Many of these writers, including Roque Dalton García, Roberto Armijo and Manlio Argueta, called him their "putative father." His work was recognized by members of the so-called Committed Generation.

The Nicaraguan poet and journalist Agenor Argüello, said his work was a precursor to the Vanguard Movement of Nicaragua. He was a scholar of Black Poetry [poesía negrista] in Latin America, and an early proponent of women's dignity at a time when this attitude was rare in El Salvador; he published an essay called "La mujer en las letras salvadoreñas" (English: Women in Salvadoran Letters).

He received the title of professor of Spanish, Language and Literature from the Ministry of Culture in 1938, and in 1940 he was elected president of the Ateneo de El Salvador, a position he held for ten years.

He died of a stroke at the age of 82.

== Work ==
- Senderos espirituales, poetry (1922).
- Ritmos de vida, poetry , (1924).
- La mariposa negra, novel, (1928).
- El silencio, novel (1935), awarded the American Book Contest prize in Matanzas, Cuba (1938).
- Tríptico de vida, poetry (1935), awarded the Iberoamerican Sonnets Prize in Argentina (1936).
- Los desterrados, volume I, literary criticism (1938).
- La Nicaragua de hoy, long-form journalistic articles (1939).
- Hacia el sol, poetry (1940).
- Vaso espiritual, poetry (1941).
- Los desterrados, volume II, literary criticism (1942).
- Raíz y sombra del futuro, poetry (1944).
- Chupasangre, short story (1945), International Alfonso Hernández Catá Award for Stories, Havana, Cuba.
- Arcilla mística, poetry (1946).
- Dos tierras, short stories (1947).
- Huésped de la noche, poetry (1948).
- El introvertismo en poesía, essays (1950).
- Un viaje por América, long-form journalistic articles (1951).
- Órbita de sonetos, poetry (1952).
- Los desterrados, volume III, literary criticism (1952).
- Poesía negra, poetry (1953).
- Ciudad dormida, long-form journalistic articles (1955).
- Desarrollo literario de El Salvador: ensayo cronológico de generaciones y etapas de las letras salvadoreñas (1958), awarded in the National Culture Contest of El Salvador (1957).
- Sucinta reseña de las letras nicaragüenses, essay (1959).
- Gavidia entre raras fuerzas étnicas de su obra y de su vida (1969).
- Poemas andantes, essays (1977).
