= Roberto Armijo =

Salvadoran writer (1937–1997)

- Born: December 13, 1937; Chalatenango
- Died: March 23, 1997 (aged 59); Paris
- Citizenship: Salvadoran
- Occupation: Professor
- Writing career
- Language: Spanish
- Genre: Poetry

Roberto Armijo (December 13, 1937, in Chalatenango, El Salvador; † March 23, 1997, in Paris, France) was a Salvadoran poet. Armijo was the lyrical voice of his generation, dubbed the "Committed Generation" by Ítalo López Vallecillos. Living relatives and close ones were important to his life.

Armijo excelled in narrative, essay, theater, and criticism. He belonged to the Círculo Literario Universitario of the Universidad de El Salvador.

== Biography ==
Roberto Armijo moved to the capital at the age of ten to continue his studies. As a young man, he was linked to intellectuals from the University Literary Circle such as Roque Dalton, Manlio Argueta, Tirso Canales and José Roberto Cea, among others.

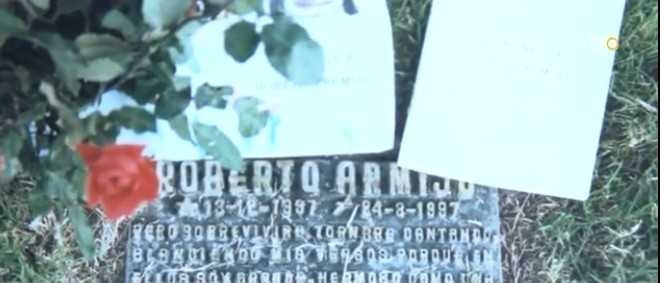
Roberto Armijo's grave in Paris, France

He died on March 23, 1997, as a result of cancer. His work includes poetry (The book of sonnets, When the lamps are lit, The blind night to the heart that sings), theater (Playing blind man's chicken) and novel (Leviathan's asthma), although the genre for which he was most recognized is the essay (Rubén Darío and his intuition of the world, Francisco Gavidia and the odyssey of his genius, or T. S. Eliot, the loneliest poet of the world).

== Artwork ==
- La noche ciega al corazón que canta, (poetry) 1959
- Seis elegías y un poema, (poetry) 1965
- Jugando a la gallina ciega, (theater) 1970
- Poesía contemporánea de Centroamérica, co-authored with Rigoberto Paredes, anthology published in Barcelona, 1983
- Trilogía de teatro de Roberto Armijo, (theater) 1990
- El asma de Leviatán (narrative).
- Los parajes de la luna y la sangre (poesía) 1996
- Cuando se enciendan las lámparas, (poems) in press 1996
- Aventura hacia el país perdido, essays in the magazine Cultura .
