= List of newspapers in El Salvador =

This is a list of newspapers in El Salvador.

- Diario El Salvador (San Salvador)
- Diario Co Latino (San Salvador)
- El Diario de Hoy (San Salvador)
- El Faro
- El Mundo (San Salvador)
- La Prensa Gráfica (San Salvador)

== See also ==
- List of newspapers
