= Álvaro Menéndez Leal =

- Born: March 13, 1931; Santa Ana
- Died: April 6, 2000; San Salvador
- Writing career
- Pen name: Álvaro Menen Desleal
- Genres: Playwright, Storyteller

Álvaro Menéndez Leal (March 13, 1931 – April 6, 2000), known as Álvaro Menen Desleal, was a Salvadoran poet, storyteller, playwright, essayist, and journalist.

== Career ==
Menéndez belonged to the Committed Generation alongside authors such as Manlio Argueta, Ítalo López Vallecillos and Roque Dalton. He has been writing for the magazine El Diario de Hoy since 1950 and was a member of its editorial board from 1953. In addition, in 1956 he founded the first news program on Salvadorian television, Telediario salvadoreño. His fate changed with every change of government in the country. He was arrested in 1953 for an alleged conspiracy against Oscar Osorio's regime, on the other hand, he worked as a cultural attaché in Mexico and was director of the National Theater.

He had his breakthrough as a writer with the play Luz negra, with which he won first prize at the Juegos Florales Hispanoamericanos Conmemorativos de Quezaltenango in Guatemala in 1965. For the essay Ciudad casa de todos he was awarded second prize at the Certamen Nacional de Cultura in 1967. In 1970 he was a prize winner of the Certamen Centroamericano "Miguel Ángel Asturias" organized by the Consejo Superior Universitario Centroamericano. 20 years later he won first prize at the Certamen Nacional de Literatura held on the occasion of the 100th anniversary of the Universidad de El Salvador with the piece La bicicleta al pie de la muralla.

== Works ==
- La llave (1962)
- Cuentos breves y maravillosos (1963)
- El extraño habitante (1964)
- Los gimnastas (1964)
- Luz negra (1965)
- El circo y otras piezas falsas (1965)
- Ciudad casa de todos (1968)
- Una cuerda de nylon y oro (1969)
- Tres piezas falsas (1969)
- La ilustre familia androide (1972)
- Hacer el amor en el refugio atómico (1974)
- Revolución en el país que edificó un castillo de hadas (1977)
- Los Vicios de Papa (1978)
- El fútbol de los locos (1998)
- Tres novelas breves y poco ejemplares (2000)
- La bicicleta al pie de la murala (2000)

== Sources ==
- The Biography: Biography of Álvaro Menéndez Leal (1931–2000)
