= Hugh Hazelton =

Writer and translator

- Born: 1946 (age 79–80)
- Education: Université de Sherbrooke
- Occupation: translator
- Awards: Governor-General's Award for French–English Translation, Canadian Association of Hispanists' Award for Best Book 2007–2009

Hugh Hazelton (born 1946) is an American-born writer and translator, living in Canada and specializing in Latin American works and their interactions with Canadian works. He is multilingual and translates French, Spanish, and Portuguese into English.

== Life ==
Hazelton was born in Chicago and moved to Canada, specifically Montreal, Quebec, in 1969. He lived briefly in Newfoundland and British Columbia but decided to make Montreal his permanent residence. He is a professor emeritus in the Faculty of Arts & Science at Concordia University, where he taught for 25 years before retiring in 2012. While he was teaching at the university, he and his colleagues developed a number of Spanish translation courses. As well as Spanish Translation, Hazelton taught Latin American civilization and the history of the Spanish language. Currently, Concordia offers a Bachelor of Arts in either French to English or English to French translation, and Spanish translation is offered as a minor.

Hazelton spent a number of years working as co-director of the Banff International Literary Translation Centre, where each year 15 literary translators from Canada, the United States, and Mexico participate in a residency program.

== Works ==
Hazelton has published four books of poetry: Crossing the Chaco (1982), Sunwords (1982), Ojo de papel (1988), and Antimatter (2003). He self-translated Antimatter into Spanish, with the Spanish name Antimateria. His 2007 book entitled Latinocanadá: A Critical Study of Ten Latin American Writers of Canada won the Best Book award from the Canadian Association of Hispanists from 2007 to 2009.

== Translation ==
Hazelton began his translation career by translating the work of friends in Montreal, and then started translating poetry for literary reviews. He often translates the work of Spanish-language writers who have immigrated to Canada. Hazelton has translated the work of Aquiles Nazoa, José Acquelin, and Alfonso Quijada Urías, among others. In 2006, he won the Governor General's Award for French-to-English translation for his translation of Vétiver, a book of poems by Joël Des Rosiers. The book had previously won two literary awards in Quebec: the Grand Prix du livre de Montréal and the Grand prix Québecor du Festival international de la poésie.

=== Selected translations (English titles) ===
Among the many works translated by Hugh Hazelton are:

- Vétiver (1999), by Joël Des Rosiers
- The Better to See You (1994), by Alfonso Quijada Urias
- Sunset (2002), by Pablo Urbanyi
- A Small Nativity (2007), by Aquiles Nazoa
- Brunhilda and the Ring (2010), by Jorge Luján
- All is Flesh (2012), by Yannick Renaud
- The Absolute is a Round Die (2014), by José Acquelin
