= Diario El Salvador =

Newspaper in El Salvador

- Type: Daily newspaper
- Owner: Government of El Salvador
- Founded: 7 October 2020; 5 years ago
- Language: Spanish
- City: San Salvador
- Country: El Salvador
- Website: https://diarioelsalvador.com

Diario El Salvador (English: El Salvador Daily) is a newspaper published in El Salvador. The newspaper is owned by the government of El Salvador.

== History ==
On 7 October 2020, Salvadoran president Nayib Bukele announced the establishment of a new newspaper: Diario El Salvador. The newspaper issued its first publication on 19 October 2020 in which it described itself as "The First Newspaper That Will Pay All Its Taxes" ("El Primer Periódico Que Pagará Todos los Impuestos") in its headline. By December 2020, Diario El Salvador was available in all 14 departments of El Salvador.

According to LPG Datos (the social research unit of La Prensa Gráfica), 78.8 percent of Diario El Salvador's content in its first four months of publication were editorials consisting of news, opinion pieces, or entertainment.

== Management ==
Diario El Salvador is owned by El Diario Nacional S.A. de C.V., a company which itself is owned by the government of El Salvador. Salvadoran president Nayib Bukele stated that Diario El Salvador finances itself instead of receiving public funding. According to LPG Datos, 86.5 percent of advertisements in Diario El Salvador in the newspaper's first four months of publishing were from the Salvadoran government.

== See also ==
- List of newspapers in El Salvador
