= Mercedes Durand =

Salvadoran journalist (1933–1999)

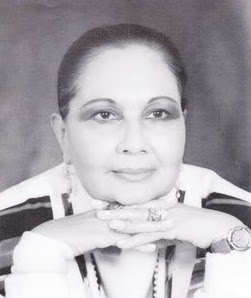
- Born: Mercedes Durán Flores; August 9, 1933 San Salvador, El Salvador
- Died: July 7, 1999 (aged 65) Mexico City, Mexico
- Occupation: Journalist, poet, essayist, academic

Mercedes Durán Flores (August 9, 1933 – July 7, 1999), better known by the pseudonym Mercedes Durand, was a Salvadoran poet and journalist.

She was a member of the Committed Generation, a literary generation established in El Salvador in the 1950s, as well as the related Grupo Octubre. The poetry she wrote between 1979 and 1981 is considered some of the most important testimonial writing of this critical period in her country.

Over the course of her life, Durand directed and presented various television and radio programs, and worked on numerous literary magazines in Mexico and El Salvador. From 1963 to 1970, she taught in the humanities department of the University of El Salvador, before her exile to Mexico amid political repression of academics. Her poetry was marked by a deep intimacy, romantic themes, precision, and simplicity, with her autobiographical poems centering on nature and love.

== Early life and education ==
Durand was born in San Salvador, El Salvador, in 1933. She began writing poetry at only 8 years old. After graduating from normal school in 1950, from 1952 to 1958 she pursued literary studies at the National Autonomous University of Mexico (UNAM), under a scholarship from the Salvadoran government of Óscar Osorio. Starting in 1950, she became a member of the Committed Generation and the Grupo Octubre, two interrelated groups of writers in El Salvador in this period.

== Career ==
Durand worked as a journalist and television producer, including as desk editor and contributor at La Prensa Gráfica from 1958 to 1960, and as news editor at the Tribuna Libre from 1965 to 1967. She also wrote stories, poems, and essays for such Salvadoran publications as Humanismo and Cultura in the 1950s and '60s. In 1960, she won first prize in the Usulután Floral Games.

She taught in the humanities department of the University of El Salvador from 1963 to 1970. While at the university, she served as a member of the school's editorial board and as director of the magazine Vida Universitaria.

However, in July 1972, President Arturo Armando Molina ordered an intervention into the university's activities, shutting down its academic and administrative operations and persecuting the university community. Durand was among the academics who were targeted in this period, and in 1972 she left for exile in Mexico.

While in Mexico, she worked as an editor on the wire section of El Día from 1975 to 1976; for the news broadcaster Canal 13 in 1977; for the publisher Magisterio from 1975 to 1977; and as a copy editor at the publishing house Posada from 1974 to 1976. She also wrote scripts for the comic book publisher Novaro from 1973 to 1975, and taught at UNAM's Center for Communication Studies.

From 1976, she was a founding member of the Latin American Federation of Journalists.

== Personal life and death ==
In 1952, Durand married the Salvadoran poet Mauricio de la Selva, with whom she had one son. They divorced in 1958, and she later remarried the leftist activist Mario Salazar Valiente. The couple returned to El Salvador after the 1992 Chapultepec Peace Accords, but Salazar Valiente died of a heart attack one day later, which drove Durand to return to Mexico in grief. She died in Mexico City in 1999, at age 65.

== Selected works ==
- Espacios, Mexico, 1955
- Sonetos elementales, San Salvador, 1958, illustrated by the painter Carlos Cañas
- Poemas del hombre y del alba, San Salvador, 1961
- Las manos en el fuego, with David Escobar Galindo, 1969
- Las manos y los siglos, Mexico, 1970
- Juego de Güija, San Salvador, 1970
- Todos los vientos, poetry anthology, San Salvador, 1972
- A sangre y fuego, 1980
- Sarah, la luna, la muchacha y otros poemas, Ciudad Juárez, 1982
- La guerrilla de las ondas y otros ensayos, San Salvador
