= José Acquelin =

Canadian poet (born 1956)

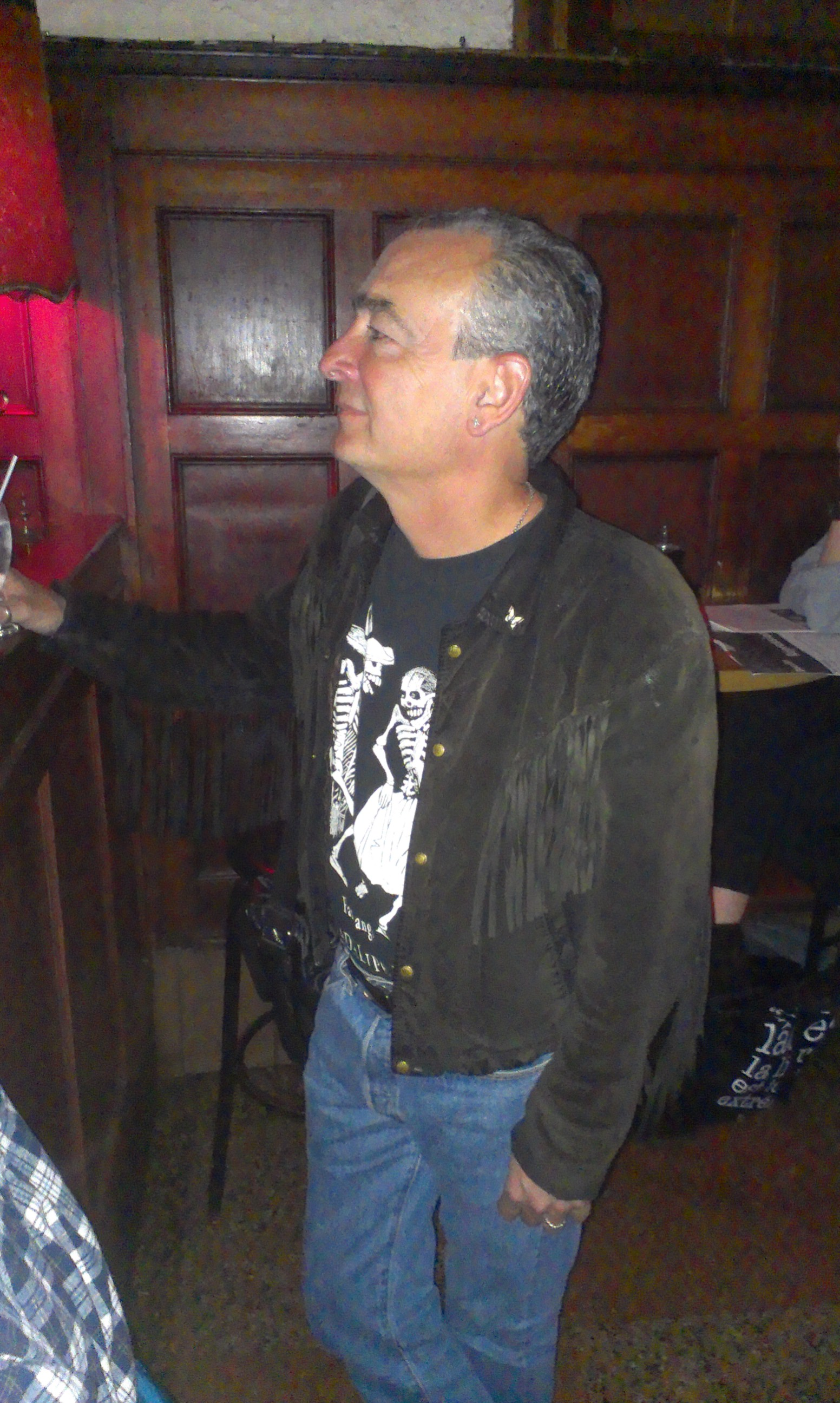
- Born: April 4, 1956 (age 70); Montreal, Quebec
- Occupation: poet
- Writing career
- Period: 1980s-present
- Notable works: Anarchie de la lumière, L'Oiseau respirable
- Notable awards: Governor General's Award for French-language poetry

José Acquelin (born April 4, 1956 in Montreal) is a Canadian poet from Quebec. He won the Governor General's Award for French-language poetry at the 2014 Governor General's Awards for Anarchie de la lumière, and was a nominee for the same award at the 1996 Governor General's Awards for L'Oiseau respirable.

Two editions of his poetry have also been translated into English for publication by Guernica Editions.

== Works ==
- 1987 - Tout va rien
- 1990 - Le Piéton immobile
- 1991 - Tarokado
- 1992 - Chien d'azur
- 1995 - Cité ouverte
- 1995 - L'oiseau respirable
- 1995 - L'éternité est un entretemps
- 1997 - Autour du temps
- 1998 - L'Orange vide
- 1999 - Comme les dix doigts de las manos
- 1999 - Là où finit la terre
- 2000 - Premiers mots de l'an 2000
- 2000 - Jaune Rouge Bleu (with Joël Des Rosiers and Suzanne Jacob)
- 2003 - L'inconscient du soleil
- 2004 - L'épluche-œil
- 2005 - Mexiquatrains
- 2006 - Personne ne sait que je t'aime
- 2006 - L'absolu est un dé rond
- 2007 - Il n'est sens que d'apprendre à mourir
- 2008 - Paradoxes de la fragilité - en marge du poème
- 2008 - Fantounel, slam de mon enfance en pays occitan
- 2008 - La plaquette cubaine (with Bertrand Laverdure and Yannick Renaud)
- 2009 - Dans l'oeil de la luciole
- 2009 - L'infini est moins triste que l'éternité
- 2010 - Jonquilles des palanges
- 2010 - Château bizarre : Rien-sur-Mer
- 2011 - Nous sommes tous des sauvages
- 2011 - Le temps a parfois de ces tendresses
- 2011 - Le zéro est l'origine de l'au-delà
- 2012 - Comme si tu avais encore le temps de rêver = Com si encara tinguessis temps de somiar
- 2014 - Anarchie de la lumière

=== Translations ===
- 2010 - The Man Who Delivers Clouds (selected poetry translated by Antonio D'Alfonso)
- 2014 - The Absolute Is a Round Die (translation of L'absolu est un dé rond by Hugh Hazelton)

== See also ==
- Canadian literature
- Canadian poetry
- List of Canadian poets
- List of Canadian writers
- List of Quebec writers
