= Recognition of same-sex unions in El Salvador =

El Salvador does not recognize same-sex marriage, civil unions or any other legal union for same-sex couples. A proposal to constitutionally ban same-sex marriage and adoption by same-sex couples was rejected twice by the Legislative Assembly of El Salvador in 2006, and once again in April 2009 after the Farabundo Martí National Liberation Front refused to grant the measure the votes it needed to be ratified.

== Legal history ==
=== Attempts to pass constitutional ban ===
The Constitution of El Salvador does not explicitly ban the recognition of same-sex marriages. Article 32 reads: "The legal foundation of the family is marriage and rests on the juridical equality of the spouses." (Note: Spanish: El fundamento legal de la familia es el matrimonio descansa en la igualdad jurídica de los cónyuges.) However, article 11 of the Family Code of El Salvador states that marriage is the "union of a man and a woman".

In 2006, a constitutional amendment to ban the legal recognition of same-sex unions was proposed by opponents of same-sex marriage. The measure was backed by the conservative Christian Democratic Party, President Antonio Saca and several other parties, including the Democratic Change, the Front for Democratic Revolution and the National Conciliation Party. It was opposed, and thus defeated, by the Farabundo Martí National Liberation Front (FMLN). It failed to win enough votes to be formally ratified due opposition from several FMLN legislators. While the FMLN has consistently opposed attempts to amend the Constitution to prohibit same-sex marriage, citing their belief that such laws are discriminatory, the party has stated that it has no intention to legalize same-sex marriage.

On 30 April 2009, the Legislative Assembly of El Salvador approved a last-minute constitutional amendment to ban same-sex marriage by defining marriage as being only between "a man and a woman" and barring same-sex couples from adopting children. Civil rights groups vowed to oppose the measure, which still needed to be voted on by other government branches before becoming law. The amendment eventually failed the same month. On 25 April 2012, another attempt to enact a constitutional ban on same-sex marriage and adoption by same-sex couples was introduced to the Legislative Assembly. The measure eventually failed on 8 February 2014, after receiving only 19 votes in favor of ratification. On 17 April 2015, another proposal was approved by the Assembly at first reading, with 47 votes in favor. However, to be successfully included in the Constitution, the bill had to be ratified by a two-thirds majority of the Assembly, or 56 of its 84 members. In November 2016, following the filing of a lawsuit to legalize same-sex marriage, some conservative MPs renewed their efforts to pass the ban. In January 2018, the Constitutional Court declared the proposed amendment unlawful because of "procedural missteps".

=== 2018 Inter-American Court of Human Rights advisory opinion ===
Homosexuality laws in Central America and the Caribbean Islands. Same-sex marriage Other type of partnership Unregistered cohabitation No recognition of same-sex couples Constitution limits marriage to opposite-sex couples Same-sex sexual activity illegal but law not enforced

On 9 January 2018, the Inter-American Court of Human Rights (IACHR) issued an advisory opinion that parties to the American Convention on Human Rights should grant same-sex couples "accession to all existing domestic legal systems of family registration, including marriage, along with all rights that derive from marriage". The advisory opinion states that:

The State must recognize and guarantee all rights derived from a family bond between persons of the same sex in accordance with the provisions of Articles 11.2 and 17.1 of the American Convention. (...) in accordance with articles 1.1, 2, 11.2, 17, and 24 of the American Convention, it is necessary to guarantee access to all the existing figures in domestic legal systems, including the right to marry. (..) To ensure the protection of all the rights of families formed by same-sex couples, without discrimination with respect to those that are constituted by heterosexual couples.

El Salvador ratified the American Convention on Human Rights on 23 June 1978 and recognized the court's jurisdiction on 6 June 1995. In the wake of the ruling, LGBT groups urged the government to abide by the decision and legalise same-sex marriage. Activists had already filed lawsuits challenging the constitutionality of the Family Code prior to the IACHR opinion. In August 2016, a law student submitted such a lawsuit with the Supreme Court of El Salvador. Calling the law discriminatory and explaining the lack of gendered terms used in Article 34 of the Constitution's summary of marriage, the lawsuit sought to allow same-sex couples to marry. On 20 December 2016, the Supreme Court dismissed the lawsuit on a legal technicality. A second lawsuit was filed on 11 November 2016, but was also dismissed by the Supreme Court on procedural grounds on 17 January 2019. On 9 August 2019, another case was admitted to the Constitutional Court. Originally filed in 2016 by activist Gabriel Gasteazoro, the case alleges that the provisions outlawing same-sex marriages in the Family Code are unconstitutional. A ruling was expected in the first three months of 2020, but was not issued.

=== Legislative action ===
In August 2021, the government of President Nayib Bukele proposed constitutional changes to permit same-sex couples to marry, prohibit discrimination on the basis of sexual orientation and legalize abortion when the life of the mother is in danger. As constitutional reforms in El Salvador must be approved by two successive congresses to take effect, the earliest the law could be enacted would have been 2027. In December 2021, Bukele backtracked and ruled out possible constitutional reforms to legalize same-sex marriage.

== Native Salvadorans ==
While many Indigenous cultures historically practiced polygamy to some extent, there are no records of same-sex marriages being performed in these cultures in the way they are commonly defined in Western legal systems. There is some evidence for the existence of two-spirit individuals or identities and behaviours that may be placed on the LGBT spectrum in Indigenous communities. In some cultures, two-spirit individuals assigned male at birth wear women's clothing and engage in household and artistic work associated with the feminine sphere. The Pipil refer to them as siwakich. Indigenous people have deep-rooted marriage traditions, placing a strong emphasis on community, family and spiritual connections. Among the Pipil, marriage was primarily monogamous and patrilocal, though elites often practiced polygyny.

== Religious performance ==
The Catholic Church opposes same-sex marriage and does not allow its priests to officiate at such marriages. The Church has been involved politically in attempts to ban same-sex marriage. In 2009, the Archbishop of San Salvador, José Luis Escobar Alas, expressed support for a constitutional amendment banning same-sex marriage, describing it as "not an attack on specific groups", but rather "an essential protection of marriage, establishing what marriage truly is and should be." He added, "The promotion and defense of the family has always been a concern for the Church, in her commitment to the common good and happiness of the human person and society at large." The Church gathered some 300,000 signatures in favor of the amendment. In December 2023, the Holy See published Fiducia supplicans, a declaration allowing Catholic priests to bless couples who are not considered to be married according to church teaching, including the blessing of same-sex couples. Pentecostal and Evangelical groups are also firmly opposed to same-sex marriage. On the other hand, the Diocese of El Salvador in the Anglican Church in Central America has taken steps to welcome LGBT members.

== Public opinion ==
According to a 2008 poll, 14% of Salvadorans supported same-sex marriage, while 80% were opposed and 6% were undecided. A 2010 poll revealed that El Salvador had some of the lowest support for legalizing same-sex marriage in Latin America, at 10%.

According to a Pew Research Center survey conducted between November 9 and December 17, 2013, 11% of Salvadorans supported same-sex marriage, while 81% were opposed. The 2017 AmericasBarometer showed that 19% of Salvadorans supported same-sex marriage. The Society for Cultural Anthropology reported in 2019 that in addition to low public support the situation for LGBT Salvadorans was "nightmarish": "Normalized intrapersonal violence and sexism intersect with widely acceptable homophobia and transphobia, subjecting many to hostility and harm. Scholars have argued that violence in the country has historically hinged on and exacerbated patriarchal gender roles, dating back to the Spanish suppression of fluid sexual practices and gender identities among the Pipil through widespread wartime sexual violence in the twentieth century."

== See also ==
- LGBT rights in El Salvador
- Recognition of same-sex unions in the Americas
- LGBT literature in El Salvador
