= One Day of Life =

Book by Manlio Argueta

- Author: Manlio Argueta
- Original title: Un Día en la Vida
- Translator: Bill Brow
- Cover artist: Owen Smith
- Language: Spanish
- Genre: Novel
- Publisher: Vintage Books
- Publication date: 1980
- Publication place: El Salvador
- English publication date: 1983
- Media type: Print
- Pages: 224 pp
- ISBN: 0-679-73243-8
- OCLC: 21594828

One Day of Life (Spanish: Un Dia en la Vida) is a novel by Salvadoran author Manlio Argueta. The novel is set in Chalatenango, El Salvador and follows the daily life of Guadalupe Guardado and the women of her family just prior to the Salvadoran Civil War. The book was banned by the government of El Salvador after its 1980 release for its descriptions of human rights violations by the Organización Democrática Nacionalista, the government's paramilitary intelligence organization.

Argueta spent over 20 years exiled in Costa Rica following arrests for his involvement in political activity against the government. One Day of Life was published in 1980, the year of the beginning of the Salvadoran Civil War.

One Day of Life was nominated by Modern Library as the fifth-best Latin American book of the 20th century. The Salvadoran newspaper El Diario de Hoy expressed doubt in the nomination. Other critics expressed disapproval of Argueta's novel being selected higher than popular writers like Ernesto Sabato and Alejo Carpentier.

== Plot summary ==
Guadalupe "Lupe" Guardado is a middle-aged Salvadoran woman who lives near Chalatenango, El Salvador. During the day she is required to do what she can to support her family, while her husband works for a wealthy landowner. Her husband José has become involved in rebellion against the economic conditions and became a leader in the Christian farmers organization. Fearing persecution for his opposition, José regularly stays "in the hills" after work and sees his family little. The Guardado's son Justino was killed by the "authorities" prior to the events in the novel, and their son-in-law Helio has "disappeared." Guadalupe's granddaughter Adolfina relays the protest at a cathedral, as well as a massacre of students on a bus. At the end of the novel, the authorities bring a beaten man to Guadalupe and Adolfina who had said the name "Adolfina" after being severely beaten. Adolfina does not recognize the man, but Guadalupe recognizes her husband José. On his previous advice, she denies knowing him, and he is taken away.
