= LGBTQ rights in El Salvador =

- El Salvador
- Legal status: Legal since 1822
- Gender identity: No
- Military: Yes
- Discrimination protections: Yes, protections based on sexual orientation and gender identity

Family rights
- Recognition of relationships: No recognition of same-sex couples
- Adoption: Same-sex couples not recognized

Lesbian, gay, bisexual, transgender, and queer (LGBTQ) people in El Salvador face considerable legal and social challenges not experienced by non-LGBTQ Salvadorans. While same-sex sexual activity between all genders is legal in the country, same-sex marriage is not recognized; thus, same-sex couples and households headed by same-sex couples are not eligible for the same legal benefits provided to heterosexual married couples.

LGBTQ individuals in El Salvador face high rates of violence, and may be victims of abuse and/or homicide. About 500 hate crimes against LGBTQ people were reported between 1998 and 2015, not accounting for the numerous likely unreported cases. Since the start of the 21st century, and with the work of activists, there have been more steps taken towards inclusivity and awareness of the Salvadoran LGBTQ community.

In response to high numbers of reported hate crimes, the Legislative Assembly ultimately passed a law enforcing penalties of imprisonment for such crimes. But prejudice and discrimination are still rife within regional communities, workplaces, schools and other institutions of the Salvadoran society. In 2018, the government approved a new policy allowing LGBTQ people to file legal complaints when discriminated against. In 2022, the Constitutional Chamber of the Supreme Court of Justice issued a reform on the Gender Identity Law, allowing individuals to change their name to match their gender identity.

Despite the sentence made by the Constitutional Chamber, the Legislative Assembly of El Salvador has not made any actions to guarantee the change of name and gender in legal documents, as of 2023.

== Cultural perceptions ==
Today, El Salvador is considered one of the most socially-homophobic countries in Latin America, and possibly the entire world. Even within the homosexual community itself, problems arise; domestic violence between homosexual couples has become a problem in the LGBT Salvadoran society. Also, there is a lack of unity among Salvadoran lesbians and gay men, as well as homosexuals of different economic classes.

There also exists a cultural and societal view, at least amongst Salvadoran gay men, that if a man is the “active” sexual partner, but does not like to kiss, then he can identify as being “not gay”—despite the fact that the dominant male, or activo, is fully engaging in homosexual sex acts. By not kissing, it is thought that one can more easily lie to or manipulate their partners, or lie to save themselves in the face of prejudice. This is in stark contrast to the receptive sexual partner, or even more openly feminine-“acting” individuals. Regarding matters of sexual role (Top, bottom and versatile), enjoying or assuming the pasivo role in El Salvador is seen as gay and many Salvadoran homosexuals see female mannerisms as negative, where as playing a dominant role and having “machismo” mannerisms is seen as positive and a sign of virility. These views among homosexuals might encourage young teen boys to only have Platonic relationships limited to oral and intercrural sex only.

In the home, sexuality is not discussed as heterosexuality is assumed the norm. While many choose not to come out to their families, those of the LGBT community who do, are often seen as bringing shame to their families. Often, those who come out are subjected to conversion therapy or family prayers to convert them to heterosexuality. When these methods do not work, families sometimes expel the homosexual individual from their homes and sever all connections. LGBT individuals who are not expelled and are somewhat accepted by their families still experience isolation and guilt for causing pain to their family.

In prisons, homosexual inmates are strictly forbidden to dress or behave in an effeminate manner. Most of the problems and attitudes within the homosexual community in El Salvador are the result of El Salvador's embedded machismo culture which frowns upon homoeroticism and homosociality. During the civil war in the 80's, many young Salvadorans were kidnapped and raped, but very few came forward to report it because they were ashamed and more afraid of being stigmatized, ostracized, and ridiculed by society than to look for justice. In El Salvador, 76 percent of male political prisoners told researchers they had experienced sexual torture.

Due to globalization, things are slowly changing in El Salvador's young LGBT community. Today young Salvadoran homosexuals encouraged the older homosexuals to come out and face the problems within El Salvador's homosexual community. However the LGBT community still faces heavy unacceptance and discrimination by the rest of the population driven by a religious and heavy machismo based culture. Homosexual adults usually have same-sex relationships during their youth and leave behind these activities once they grow to adults, getting married and having children, living a heterosexual life in Salvadoran society. The nation's male name "El Salvador" evokes masculinity, and to be Salvadoran means to be virile.

Heterosexuals in El Salvador usually are afraid of defending or having homosexual friends because of the fear of being stigmatized, ostracized and ridiculed by their peers, and being accused of being gay themselves. Heterosexuals usually shy away from homosexual subjects that trouble the country due to society, religious and machismo culture. Heterosexual Salvadorans hide their feelings about the homosexuals in their society, and they either do not give opinions or go completely against homosexuality. For the heterosexuals in El Salvador, being gay friendly is seen as being against nature, being anti-religious, anti-masculinity and even diabolic in Salvadoran society.

== Legality of same-sex sexual activity ==
Same-sex sexual activity is legal in El Salvador. The age of consent is 18.

== Recognition of same-sex relationships ==
Same-sex marriage is not recognized. Since 2006, there have been proposals to change the Constitution of El Salvador to restrict the recognition of same-sex marriage, even when these are couples married legally outside of the country. Individuals can adopt, but same-sex couples cannot adopt as a couple. The Law on Family Violence (Spanish: Ley contra la Violencia Intrafamiliar) also does not apply to same-sex couples.

In August 2016, a lawyer in El Salvador filed a lawsuit before the country's Supreme Court asking for the nullification of Article 11 of the Family Code which defines marriage as a heterosexual union. Labeling the law as discriminatory and explaining the lack of gendered terms used in Article 34 of the Constitution's summary of marriage, the lawsuit sought to allow same-sex couples the right to wed. On 20 December, the Salvadoran Supreme Court rejected the lawsuit on a legal technicality.

A second lawsuit against the same-sex marriage ban was filed on 11 November 2016. On 17 January 2019, the Supreme Court dismissed the case on procedural grounds.

In January 2018, the Inter-American Court of Human Rights (IACHR) issued an advisory opinion, in which it held same-sex marriage to be a human right protected by the American Convention on Human Rights. That same month, the Constitutional Court declared a proposed ban on same-sex marriage unlawful.

In August 2019, a lawsuit to recognize same-sex marriage was admitted for a hearing before the Constitutional Court.

== Discrimination protections ==
Discrimination against LGBT people in El Salvador is very widespread. Polls show high levels of prejudice directed at LGBT people, and there are many reports of anti-gay harassment and bias-motivated violence.

Much of the nation's advocacy on behalf of LGBT rights comes from William Hernández, and his partner, Joaquin Caceres and the other members of Asociación Entre Amigos (Among Friends Association), who have faced harassment and even death threats for their activism.

In April 2009, the Ministry of Public Health and Social Assistance published new guidelines banning discrimination against LGBT people and HIV-positive people in health services.

On 4 May 2010, President Mauricio Funes issued a presidential decree banning discrimination based on sexual orientation and gender identity in the public sector. At the same time, President Funes created a Sexual Diversity Division within the Secretary of Social Inclusion, which was headed by an openly lesbian woman.

Although there have been gains on removing discrimination, activists report that outside of the government and administrative areas, discrimination is still ongoing.

In 2015, the Salvadoran Parliament passed a law adding sexual orientation and gender identity to the Criminal Code's hate crime provisions. The Code provides a penalty of between three and six years imprisonment for those who commit a crime based on the victim's race, ethnicity, political affiliation, sexual orientation or gender identity.

In April 2018, the Government approved the Institutional Policy for the Care of the LGBT Population (Política Institucional para la Atención de la Población LGBT). The policy, written by the Government with the aid of LGBT activists, as well as the national police and public security officials, allows LGBT people to file legal complaints against people who discriminate against them. Claims of crimes, torture and cruel, inhuman and degrading treatments against LGBT people will also be fully investigated by police forces. This was done with the aim of guaranteeing and protecting the rights of LGBT people.

== Gender Identity Law ==
On February 22, 2022, the Constitutional Chamber of the Supreme Court of Justice ordered that the current law be reformed to allow individuals who do not identify with their assigned gender at birth to change their names to match their gender identity. This came from a lawsuit from 2016 filed by a transgender activist, on account of the current Name Law violating the Constitution of the Republic. The Court ruled that the current Name Laws were unconstitutional, as they discriminated individuals on the basis of gender, thus calling for reform.

Despite the calls for a reform, The Legislative Assembly of El Salvador has not taken any action to guarantee the change of name and gender in legal documents for transgender people, as of 2023.

== Military service ==
Lesbian, gay and bisexual people are not allowed to serve openly in the Armed Forces of El Salvador.

== Healthcare ==
=== Blood Donation ===
Gay and bisexual men are allowed to donate blood. Blood donation policy prohibits those who "engage in risky behaviours" from donating (people with multiple sex partners, for instance).

=== Transgender Health ===
Transgender individuals face a lot of discrimination within the healthcare system. In hospitals, it is often the case where healthcare specialists dismiss patients' problems as being a side effect of their transgender identity. They are also sometimes made to wait longer or even denied as a result of their gender identity, though it can be done discreetly. Additionally, while hormone therapy and sex reassignment surgery are not well studied, as there is a lack of protocol and programs. However, one study found that many trans women did not seek out medical help after suffering side effects from surgeries.

=== Mental Health ===
Members of the LGBT community experience suicide ideation and suicide attempts at a higher percentage than the general population. Even when reaching out for psychological care, many individuals felt insecure and experienced prejudice. And often psychological care comes in the form of conversion therapies, often when parents are attempting to modify the sexual orientation of their children.

=== HIV/AIDS ===
The end of the Civil War and the democratization paved the way for NGOs and private citizens to campaign for HIV/AIDS education. Yet, since the 1990s, people working for such groups, most notably The Oscar Romero AIDS Project, have faced harassment and death threats.

Since 2005, a national policy on HIV/AIDS has been developed, and it has gradually gotten the support of major politicians. In 2007, the first National testing day for HIV/AIDS was established. It continues to be held on the last Thursday or Friday of the month of June. In 2009, a national health plan to stop the spread of HIV/AIDS included a prohibition on sexual orientation-based discrimination in health care.

== Education ==
=== Primary and secondary education ===
Sexuality is not discussed in school curriculum, which falls in line with societal expectations. This leads to invisibility in school by many LGBT students to avoid discrimination. However, LGBT students, particularly students whose their gender expression does not match that assigned at birth, drop out of school at high rates. Additionally LGBT students have been expelled for their sexuality and identity.

=== Higher education ===
The lack of discussion continues in higher education as no known universities or graduate programs have Sexuality Studies programs. There have however been academic publications made in universities, which a majority coming from the University of El Salvador. Many are from a psychological or legal science perspective, though there are a varying levels of support within these publications.

== Workforce ==
LGBT individuals have historically been discriminated against in the workforce. While many LGBT individuals hide their sexuality or identity, a study in 1998 found that 90% of LGBT people earned less than minimum wage at their job, despite many of them having higher education. Transgender individuals particularly suffer, as many of them are lacking in education and their visual gender expression is often not accepted. As a result, a large number of transgender individuals participate in sex work in order to survive. While they obtain much higher pay, they are more susceptible to sexually transmitted diseases and sexual assault.

== Living conditions ==
While some legal advances for LGBT rights have been made, public attitudes about LGBT people are often still negative, even violently intolerant.

A major reason for these negative public attitudes about LGBT people are the traditional teachings of the main religions in the country; namely the Catholic Church and several conservative and evangelical Protestant denominations. Over 50% identifies as actively practicing Catholics, while many of the remaining population attends evangelical churches. As a result, many Salvadorans hold traditional, religious beliefs on homosexuality. These religious denominations believe that homosexuality and cross dressing are signs of immorality, and many of their leaders have organized opposition to LGBT rights legislation.

In July 2017, the capital city, San Salvador, authorized the permanent painting of several crossroads with the colours of the rainbow in support of LGBT rights.

=== Violence against LGBT individuals ===
There have been multiple instances of violence and murders targeting gay and trans people throughout El Salvador's history. It was reported that during the Salvadoran Civil War, unknown forces kidnapped over a dozen transgender sex workers in the early 1980s. This event mobilized the early activity of William Hernández and his partner Joaquin Cáceres, who formed the first formally-established LGBT organization Entre Amigos.

After the Civil War, violence against LGBT individuals continued. There were reports of violence targeting LGBT throughout the 1990s, and AIDS and LGBT rights activists received regular threats of violence. A survey from 2006 until 2009 showed continued threats of violence against LGBT activists, violence against LGBT members, and lack of investigation by police in LGBT deaths as a result of gang violence. On 9 September 2015, El Salvador lawmakers passed a law enhancing penalties for hate crimes based on sexual orientation and gender identity. However, many hate crimes towards members of the LGBT community were not officially reported until 2015. And those that were often resulted in blatant refusal to cooperate by the police or accusation on LGBT individuals who in fact were the victims.

While gang violence is prevalent in all of El Salvador, some gangs target members of the LGBT community. The pervasiveness of gang violence within El Salvador can also contribute to the lack of reporting hate crimes, for the fear of reprisal. While there is violence in the form of physical and sexual assault, it also takes the form of forced recruitment and "taxing" for one's safety. LGBT members who participate in sex work are also more likely to be victims of gang violence, due to increased exposure.

Men particularly have faced violence from police officers, soldiers, and prison guards as they are often targeted for effeminate behavior or outfits. This comes in the form of unwarranted searching, stealing of property, sexual assault, and other physical violence. Additionally, transgender people are often only recognized for their assigned gender at birth in the judicial system. In the investigation of Doris and Maricela in 1999, the two transvestites were forced to wear men's clothing for their hearing.

On July 28, 2020, a judge in San Salvador ruled that three police officers were convicted of the killing of a transgender woman Camila Díaz Córdova in January 2019. They were sentenced to 20 years of prison each.

=== Elections ===
Hugo Salinas, former mayor of Intipucá (2009-2012), is the only known openly gay person to have held public office in El Salvador.

== Activism ==
=== First Activist Organization ===
El Salvador's first and oldest LGBT activist organization is called Among Friends (Spanish: Entre Amigos). It was established after a group of LGBT individuals came together after the Salvadoran Civil War to discuss the HIV epidemic. This discussion led to the development of the National Foundation for the Prevention, Education, and Accompaniment of People with HIV/AIDS (Spanish: Fundación Nacional para la Prevención, Educación y Acompañamiento de la Persona VIH/SIDA).

=== Pride Parade ===
To commemorate the massacre of many trans women in the 1980s during the Civil War, Entre Amigos organized El Salvador's first Gay Pride Parade (Spanish: Marcha del Orgullo Gay) in June 1997. The march took the path from Cuscatlán Park to Plaza Francisco Morazán, as it was near the massacre from the 1980s. The pride parade continues to this day and is a celebration of LGBT identities.

== Public opinion ==
A 2010 poll revealed that El Salvador had some of the lowest support for legalizing same-sex marriage in Latin America at 10%.

A 2013 study showed that 62% of Salvadoran do not accept homosexuality and 85% of the population believes it to be acceptable to attack a transgender individual on the basis of their identity.

The 2017 AmericasBarometer showed that 19% of Salvadorans supported same-sex marriage.

== Summary table ==
Same-sex sexual activity legal	Yes (Since 1822)
Equal age of consent (18)	Yes (Since 1822)
Anti-discrimination laws in employment only	Yes (Since 2018)
Anti-discrimination laws in the provision of goods and services	Yes (Since 2018)
Anti-discrimination laws in all other areas (incl. indirect discrimination, hate speech)	Yes (Since 2018)
Hate crime law includes sexual orientation and gender identity	Yes (Since 2015)
Same-sex marriages	No
Recognition of same-sex couples	No
Adoption by single LGBT persons	Yes
Stepchild adoption by same-sex couples	No
Joint adoption by same-sex couples	No
Gays, lesbians and bisexuals allowed to serve openly in the military	Yes
Right to change legal gender	No
Right to change legal name	No (Has not been approved by Congress, despite of the sentence made by the Constitutional Chamber)
Access to IVF for lesbians	No
Automatic parenthood for both spouses after birth	No
Conversion therapy banned on minors	No
Commercial surrogacy for gay male couples	No (Banned regardless of sexual orientation)
Men who have sex with men allowed to donate blood	Yes

== See also ==
- LGBT rights in the Americas
- Recognition of same-sex unions in El Salvador
- Human rights in El Salvador
- LGBT literature in El Salvador
