= Ana Margarita Gasteazoro =

Salvadoran activist and political prisoner (1950–1993)

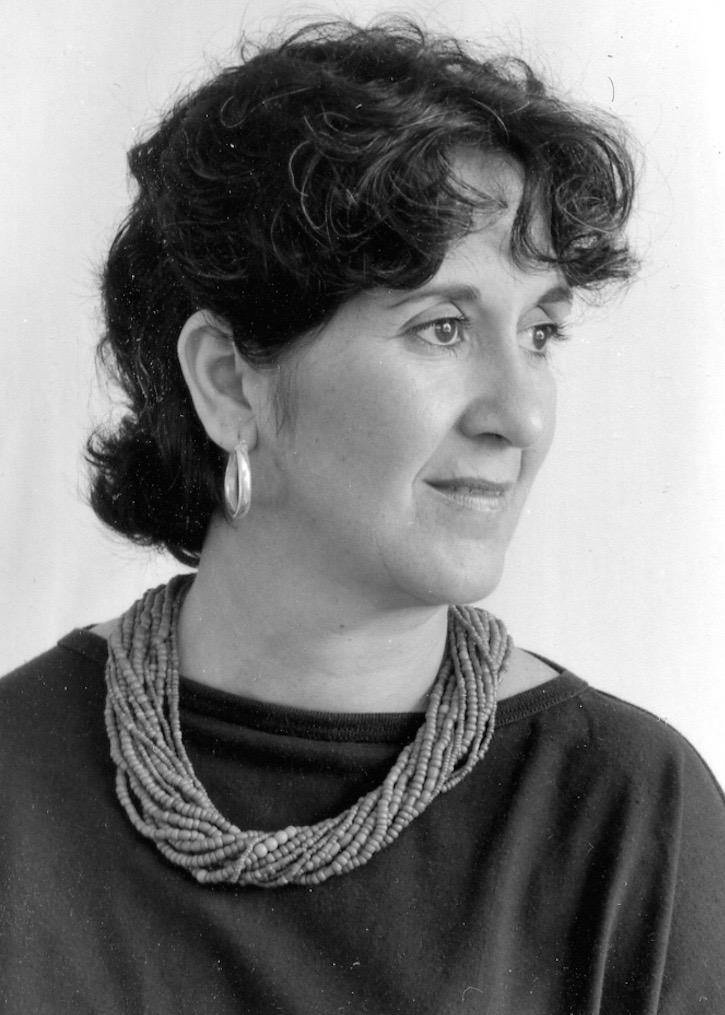
Gasteazoro in 1993

Ana Margarita Gasteazoro (1950–1993) was a Salvadoran political activist and political prisoner. Born to a wealthy family, she was a clandestine operative with the Farabundo Martí Popular Liberation Forces during the Salvadoran Civil War. In 1981, she was disappeared by the Salvadoran National Guard and spent two years in prison.

== Early life and education ==
Ana Margarita Gasteazoro Escolande was born on 10 October 1950, in San Salvador to a wealthy family. Her mother, Ana Marina Escolande, was religiously conservative and a member of Opus Dei. Her father, José Agustin Gasteazoro Mejia, was a civil engineer. She attended the elite American School in San Salvador. She was then sent to a boarding school in Guatemala run by the Maryknoll Sisters, where one of her teachers was Marjorie Bradford Melville.

Gasteazoro was sent to the United States where she had secretarial training at the Bay State Junior College in Massachusetts. She returned to Central America after war broke out between Honduras and El Salvador in 1968. She studied briefly at the Central American University in El Salvador before going to Spain where she studied at the University of Navarra. She lived in Ibiza for almost four years, working as a secretary. In 1974 and 1975 she lived in Jamaica.

== Membership in the resistance ==
Gasteazoro returned to El Salvador, taught English, and re-enrolled in the Central American University. Her professor Guillermo Ungo was a member of the social democratic party National Revolutionary Movement (MNR), and she said she wanted to work for the party. She started working with the MNR in 1976, assisting in the publication of the organization's newsletter and organizing a women's group. She became the organization's Secretary of Youth. Being fluent in English, she often represented the organization at international meetings, including those of the Socialist International. She was the vice president of Socialist International Women.

In 1979, increasingly frustrated with the atrocities of the Salvadoran Civil War, Gasterazoro joined the guerilla organization Farabundo Martí Popular Liberation Forces. She became a top-level clandestine operative for the Farabundo Martí National Liberation Front, using the nom de guerre "Monica". She was in charge of international and national propaganda. She located safe houses for meetings, produced a documentary film, and wrote scripts for an underground radio station.

== Imprisonment and later life ==
Gasteazoro was disappeared on 11 May 1981, by the National Guard following a raid on a safe house where she was staying. She was bound and sexually assaulted. She spent 14 days imprisoned at the National Guard headquarters before being transferred to the women's prison in Ilopango. She was accused of "conspiring against the security of the Republic". She spent two years as a prisoner of conscience, without any charges levied against her or a trial. Her cause was championed by Amnesty International. She joined other activists to form a women's unit of the Committee of Political Prisoners of El Salvador. She was released in May 1983 during a mass amnesty. Following her release, she went into exile, living in Costa Rica until 1992.

Gasteazoro was diagnosed with breast cancer, which was treated in 1991. The cancer recurred and she died on 30 January 1993, in San Salvador.

A book of her life, Tell Mother I'm in Paradise: Memoirs of a Political Prisoner in El Salvador, was based on extensive interviews with Judy Blankenship and Andrew Wilson. The book was published in Spanish in 2019 by the Museo de la Palabra y la Imagen. It was published in English in 2022.
