= El Mundo (El Salvador) =

- Diario Libre y Objetivo
- Front page of El Mundo in 2013
- Type: Daily newspaper
- Founded: 1967
- Language: Spanish
- Headquarters: San Salvador, El Salvador
- Website: diario.elmundo.sv

El Mundo is a daily morning newspaper in El Salvador.

== History ==
It was first published on February 6, 1967, by Dr. Juan José Borga. Several journalists who had worked at the Tribuna Libre joined the new paper, which was led by writer Waldo Chávez Velasco.

Originally an evening paper (published Monday to Saturday), it switched to morning publication in 2004.

A 1991 report described the paper as "less conservative" than the other leading daily papers in the country.

== See also ==
- List of newspapers in El Salvador
