= Jacinta Escudos =

Salvadoran writer

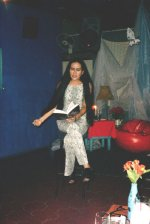
Jacinta Escudos

Jacinta Escudos, born in San Salvador, is a writer whose body of work includes novels, short stories and poetry.

== Life ==
Escudos was born on 1 September 1961. She writes creative nonfiction, and journalistic chronicles that have been published in such Central American daily outlets as La Nación, La Prensa Gráfica and El Nuevo Diario. While she primarily writes in Spanish, she is fluent in English, German, and French, having worked as a translator for several years. She has lived in several European and Central American countries.

In the late 1980s she was a strong supporter of the freedom fighters in El Salvador who was living in Germany. Some of her writing that she had written for a friend in East Germany was given to the Nicaraguan poet Claribel Alegría. Alegria was told that it was by a dead fighter in El Salvador. The writing was in fact part of Escudos's poem "to come back". Alegria had the work published under the name Rocio America. Escudos discovered the mistake when she returned from Germany to South America and again began writing.

Her novel, A-B-Sudario (Alfaguara, 2003), was awarded the Mario Monteforte Toledo Central American Prize for Fiction (Premio Centroamericano de Novela Mario Monteforte Toledo). She has also received residencies by La Maison des Écrivains Étrangers et des Traducteurs in Saint-Nazaire, France and Heinrich Böll Haus in Langenbroich, Germany.

Despite the limited literary circulation in Central America, some of Escudos's unpublished work has been recognized. In 2002, Escudos won a national contest in El Salvador, the Tenth Annual Literary Contest of Ahuachapán (Décimos Juegos Florales de Ahuachapán) for her book, Crónicas para sentimentales

== Publications ==
Escudos's notable literary enterprises include:

- Crónicas para sentimentales (F&G Editores, 2010)
- El Diablo sabe mi nombre (Uruk editores, 2008)
- A-B-Sudario (Alfaguara, 2003)
- Felicidad doméstica y otras cosas aterradoras (Editorial X, 2002)
- El Desencanto (Dirección de Publicaciones e Impresos, 2001)
- Cuentos Sucios (Dirección de Publicaciones e Impresos, 1997)
- Contra-corriente (UCA Editores, 1993)
- Apuntes de una historia de amor que no fue (UCA Editores, 1987)

Her work, in addition, has been featured in the following collections:

- Idea crónica: Literatura de no ficción iberoamericana (Fundación TyPA, 2006)
- El Milagrero/Der Wundertäter (DTV, 2006)
- Literaturas centroamericanas hoy (Iberoamericana/Vervuert Verlag, 2005)
- Antología de cuentistas salvadoreñas (UCA Editores, 2004)
- Cicatrices: un retrato del cuento centroamericano (Anamá Ediciones, 2004)
- Pequeñas resistencias 2: Antología del cuento centroamericano contemporáneo (Páginas de Espuma, 2003)
- Um etwas Zeit zu retten: Literatur und Kunst im Heinrich-Böll-Haus Langenbroich (Heinrich Böll Stiftung, 2003)
- Papayas und Bananen: Erotische und andere Erzählungen aus Zentralamerika (Brandes & Apsel Verlag, 2002)
- Los centroamericanos: (Antología de cuentos) (Alfaguara, 2002)
- Cuentos centroamericanos (Editorial Andrés Bello, 2000)
- Cuentistas hispanoamericanas: Antología (Literal Books, 1996)
- And We Sold the Rain: Contemporary Fiction from Central America (Seven Stories Press, 1996, 2nd Edition [1988])
- Lovers and Comrades: Women's Resistance Poetry from Central America (The Women's Press, 1989)
- You Can't Drown the Fire: Latin American Women Writing in Exile (Cleis Press, 1988)
- Ixok Amar-Go: Central American Women's Poetry for Peace/Poesia de mujeres centroamericanas por la paz (Granite Press, 1987)
