= Silvia Matus =

Salvadoran poet and sociologist

Silvia Ethel Matus Avelar (born March 12, 1950) is a Salvadoran feminist sociologist and poet. In 1992, she founded the Colectiva Media Luna, the first group of lesbian women in the history of El Salvador. In addition to her work with Media Luna, she has been part of organizations such as Las Mélidas and the Prudencia Ayala Feminist Coalition.

== Biography ==
Matus discovered her love for poetry during her teenage years.

In the 1980s, she participated as a combatant in guerrilla organizations within the Farabundo Martí National Liberation Front during the Salvadoran Civil War. Although these groups were often homophobic and sexist, Matus had her first lesbian relationship in 1987 while she was still a part of them.

After the armed conflict ended, she founded in 1992 the Salvadoran Lesbian Feminist Collective Media Luna, the first lesbian group in the country’s history. This organization existed from 1992 to 1998 as a network of lesbian women, many of them former guerrilla fighters, and it was formed in response to the exclusion of lesbians from existing women's organizations at the time.

Her writings have appeared over the years in magazines, newspapers, and anthologies, as well as in her poetry books En la dimensión del tránsito (1996) and Insumisa primavera (2002). Due to lack of financial resources, her first poetry book, En la dimensión del tránsito, was published in Honduras at a friend’s print shop; her second book, Insumisa primavera, was published through the support of the Technological University of El Salvador.

In 2011, she published her third poetry book, Partisana del amor.

== Style and themes ==
Matus’s poetry explores themes such as lesbian love, feminism, and violence in Salvadoran society, always from a gender perspective. The desiring female body, in particular, plays a prominent role in her work. These themes can be seen in poems such as “To Love Another Woman,” as shown in the following excerpt:

To love another woman
is the opening to the infinite
the mystery of the ocean
the delicacy of the rose
and it is also…
to be exposed and fragile.

== Recognition and legacy ==
In recognition of her poetic work, she received the "Women of the Century" award in 2000, granted by the feminist group Las Dignas and COM.

In 2020, the organization Las Hijas de Safo inaugurated the first lesbofeminist library in the country at the Casa de Safo Feminist Cultural Center and named it after Silvia Matus, in honor of her legacy in lesbian cultural activism.

== Works ==
- En la dimensión del tránsito (1996)
- Insumisa primavera (2002)
- Partisana del amor (2011)

== Bibliography ==
- Borja, Luis (2021). The Voice of the Other: An Approach to Homoerotic Discourse in Salvadoran Poetry.
- Vela, Tania Pléitez (2022). "Disturbing the wound, managing suffering: Rebellion in the poetry of lesbian Salvadoran authors". Whatever. A Transdisciplinary Journal of Queer Theories and Studies (in Spanish). 5: 223–254. doi:10.13131/2611-657X.whatever.v5i1.178. ISSN 2611-657X.
