= Alfonso Quijada Urías =

Salvadoran poet and author

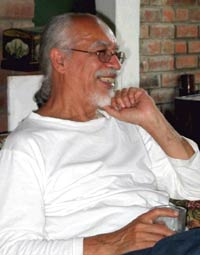
- Born: 8 December 1940 (age 84); Quezaltepeque, El Salvador
- Occupation(s): Poet, author

Alfonso Quijada Urías (born 8 December 1940), is a Salvadoran poet and an author. Quijada has published various poems such as the anthology "De aquí en adelante" (San Salvador), in conjunction with the poets José Roberto Cea, Manlio Argueta, Tirso Canales and Roberto Armijo. Many of his works deal with the effects of war and the realities of urban life in Central America.

== Biography ==
Quijada was born in Quezaltepeque, in the La Libertad Department of El Salvador.

In 1962, he won the second prize in the III Certamen Cultural de la Asociación de Estudiantes de Humanidades de la Universidad de El Salvador. In 1963, he won the third prize from the Juegos Florales de Zacatecoluca. In 1967, he won the first prize for poetry at the Juegos Florales de Quetzaltenango in Guatemala. In 1971 he won first prize at the Bienal de Poesía Latinoamericana in Panama.

In 1981, he moved to Nicaragua, and later to Mexico, where he worked as a journalist. In 2003, he was awarded the "Premio de Poesía Instituto Cervantes". He now lives in Canada.

== Selected works ==
=== Poetry ===
- Poemas (San Salvador, 1967)
- Sagradas escrituras (1969)
- El otro infierno (1970)
- Los estados sobrenaturales y otros poemas (San Salvador, 1971),
- La esfera imaginaria (Vancouver, 1997),
- Es cara musa (San Salvador, 1997)
- Toda razón dispersa (San Salvador, 1998).

=== Prose ===
- Cuentos (San Salvador, 1971),
- La fama infame del famoso a(pá)trida (San Salvador, 1979),
- Para mirarte mejor (Tegucigalpa, 1987),
- Lujuria tropical (novela, San Salvador, 1996).
