= Nora Méndez =

Salvadoran poet (born 1969)

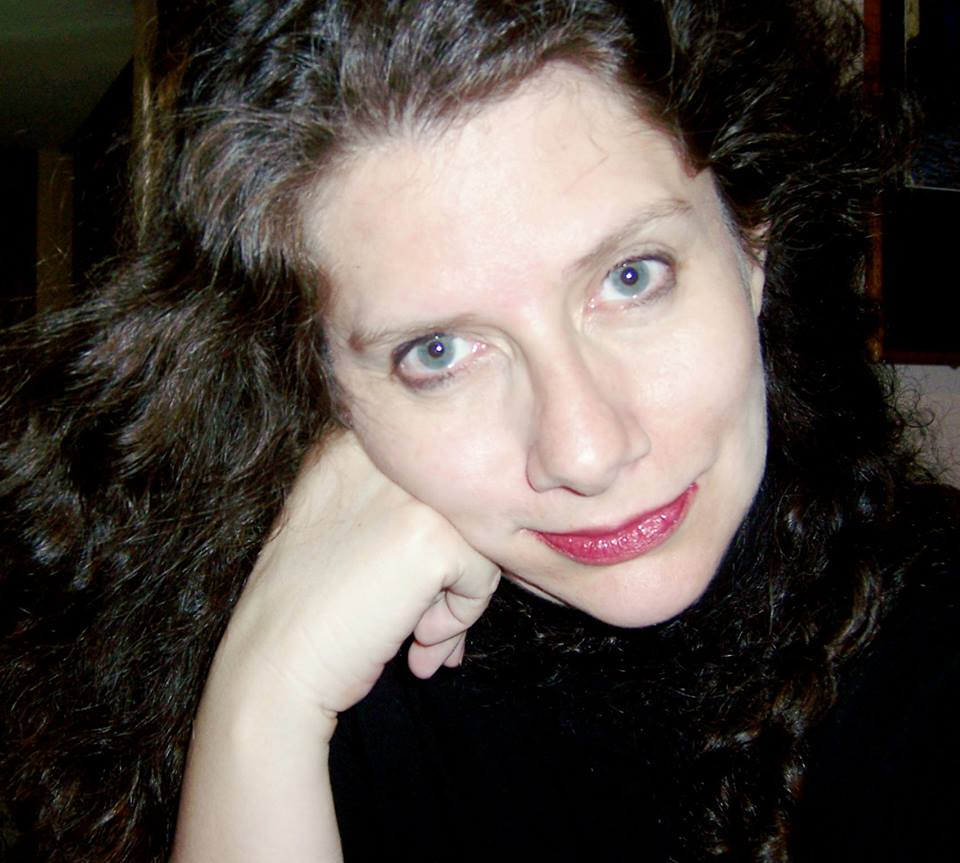
- Born: 24 March 1969 (age 57); San Salvador, El Salvador
- Education: University of El Salvador
- Occupation: Poet

Nora Méndez (born March 24, 1969) is a Salvadoran poet.

== Biography ==
Born in San Salvador, Méndez studied sociology and communication at the University of El Salvador. She has been described as a "resistance poet", writing verse in response to the political situation in El Salvador. At one time a political prisoner, she later became active with ASTAC, the Salvadoran Association of Cultural Workers. Other themes of her work include domestic violence and the status of women in her country. Her work has appeared in several anthologies, beginning with Poets of the Resistance, published by the University of Michigan in 1996. Some of her poetry has been translated into German for publication online. Méndez has appeared at poetry festivals in her native country and in Nicaragua and Colombia, as well as elsewhere in Latin America and in Europe. She has also performed as a singer, appearing with the group Nuevamérica, for whom she also wrote songs, during the 1980s. Among her publications are the books Atravesarte a pie toda la vida (2002) and La Estación de los Pájaros (2004).
