= Otto René Castillo =

Guatemalan poet, activist, guerrilla fighter and revolutionary

- Born: April 25, 1934; Quetzaltenango, Guatemala
- Died: March 23, 1967 (aged 32); Zacapa, Guatemala
- Occupations: Poet, revolutionary
- Partner: Nora Paíz Cárcamo
- Writing career
- Language: Spanish
- Notable works: Poema Tecún Umán; Vámonos patria a caminar
- Notable awards: Premio Centroamericano de poesía (1955)

Otto René Castillo (April 25, 1934 – March 23, 1967) was a Guatemalan poet, activist, guerrilla fighter and revolutionary.

== Early life and activism ==
Castillo was born in Quetzaltenango on April 25, 1934, to middle-class parents. Active in progressive politics as a high school student, Castillo went into exile in El Salvador in 1954 after the overthrow of Guatemalan President Jacobo Arbenz by a Central Intelligence Agency-orchestrated coup d'etat.

In El Salvador, Castillo met Salvadoran poet Roque Dalton and founded an influential literary circle. He spent the next several years in and out of exile, including a period of time spent in East Germany at the University of Leipzig. A handful of younger writers—those who were just beginning to publish or had not yet done so—headed for El Salvador, joining up with young Salvadorans sharing the same concerns. The Salvadorans had already gathered around the most charismatic figure among them: Roque Dalton. One of the recently arrived Guatemalans, Otto Rene Castillo, quickly captured Dalton's attention and became the group's ideologue. During the 1960s, these young writers joined up in Mexico with the group of writers that had left Guatemala in 1954.

== Family ==
Otto Rene Castillo never married in Guatemala, but during his stay in East Germany, he fathered three sons. Documentary filmmaker Karl-Heinz Mund, together with Werner Kohlert made a short commemorative documentary about Castillo, entitled Ganz Berlin ist in deinen Augen... (Todo Berlin esta en tus ojos...), produced by DEFA Studio fuer Dokumentarfilme in Berlin.

== Publications and death ==
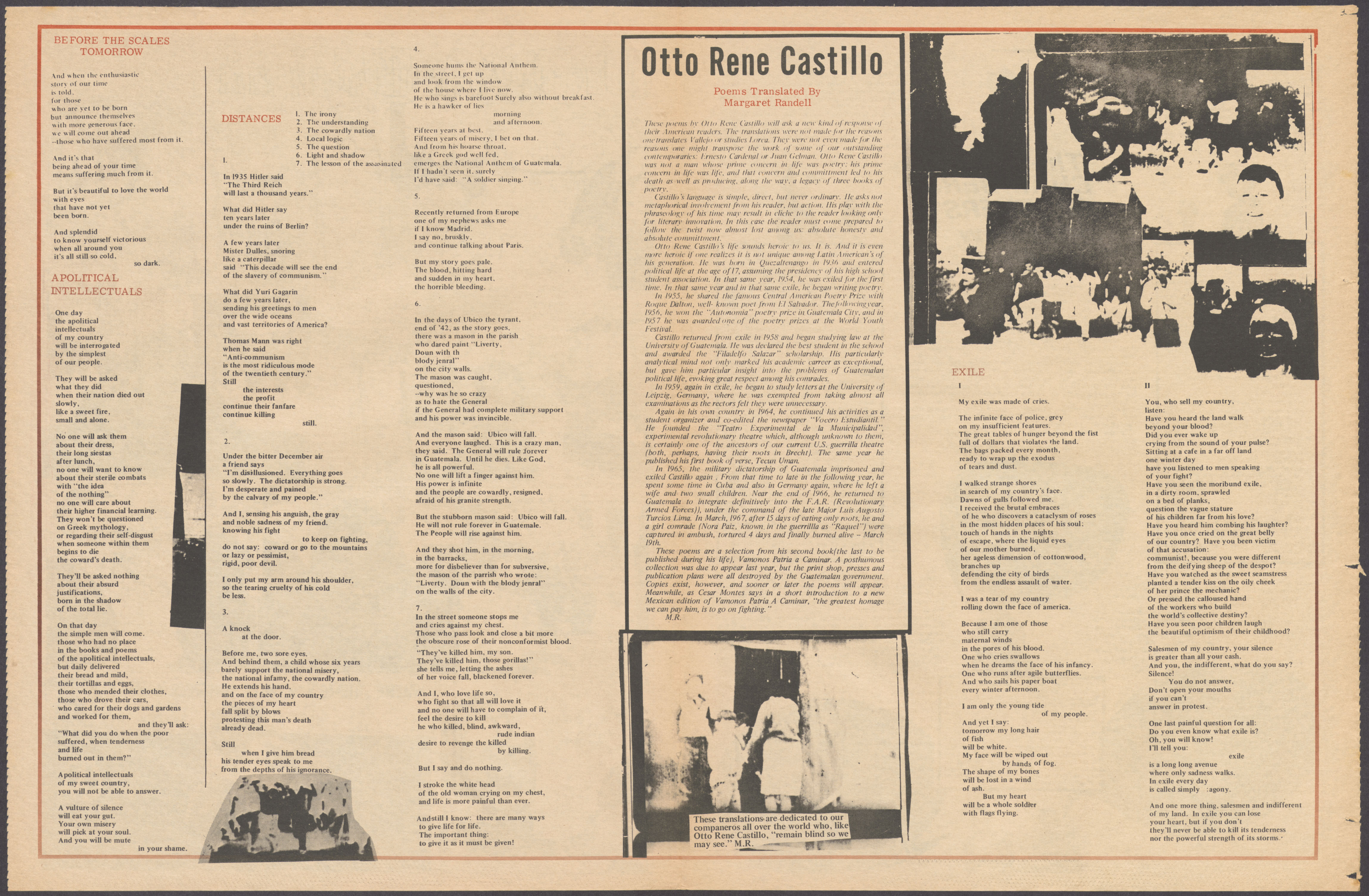
A center spread in the Seattle underground paper Helix, December 2, 1968, carries a number of translations of poems by Castillo, translated by Margaret Randell.

The early to mid-1960s saw the publication of the only two volumes of work put into print during Castillo's lifetime, Poema Tecún Umán and Vámonos patria a caminar. In 1966, he clandestinely returned to Guatemala and joined the guerrilla struggle with the Rebel Armed Forces, where he served as the chief of propaganda and education. After operating in the Sierra de las Minas for several months, he was captured by government forces and taken to Zacapa barracks alongside his comrade, Nora Paíz Cárcamo in March 1967. There they were interrogated, tortured, and burned alive.
