= Claudia Hernández (writer) =

Salvadoran short story writer (born 1975)

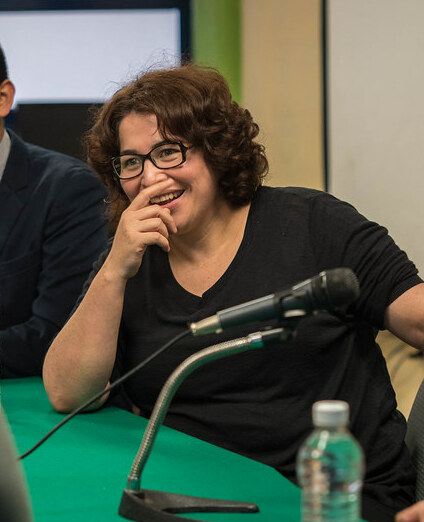
Picture of Claudia Hernández

Claudia Hernández González is a Salvadoran short story writer. She was born in El Salvador in 1975. She was awarded the Anna Seghers Prize in 2004. She is widely regarded as among the pre-eminent living Salvadoran writers. Many of her stories concern the grotesque elements of life during and after the civil war.

== Bibliography ==
- Otras ciudades (2001)
- Mediodía de frontera (2002)
- Olvida uno (2005)
- De fronteras (2007)
