= Hugo Lindo =

Salvadoran writer, diplomat, politician, and lawyer

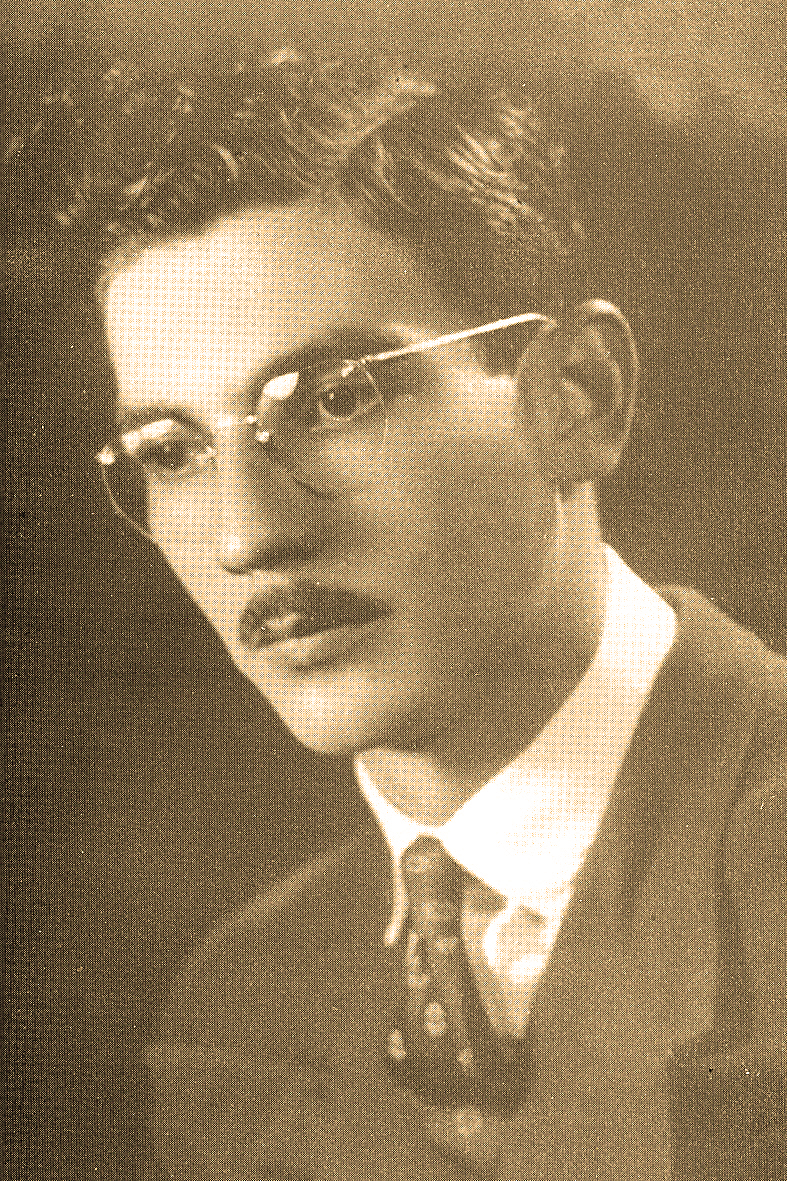
Hugo Lindo.

Hugo Lindo Olivares (La Unión, October 13, 1917 – San Salvador, September 9, 1985) was a Salvadoran writer, diplomat, politician, and lawyer.

== Biography ==
Hugo Lindo was born in 1917 in the port of La Unión, El Salvador, in a working, middle-class family. He studied in the University of El Salvador where he graduated as a Doctor in Jurisprudence and Social Sciences. In 1947, he traveled to Korea as a diplomat.

Lindo was El Salvador's ambassador for the Republic of Chile (1952–1959) and for the Republic of Colombia (1959-1960). He became the Minister of Education in 1961 and later returned to diplomatic service as the Salvadorian ambassador to Spain (1969-1972). When he returned to El Salvador, he ran a gallery-bookshop called “Altamar” until the economic crisis in El Salvador forced him to close. He participated in the foundation of Dr. José Matías Delgado University and served as the university's Dean of the Faculty of Fine Arts from until his death (1979-1985).

He was married to Carmen Fuentes and had 7 children, among which came the writer, Ricardo Lindo Fuentes, and the historian, Héctor Lindo Fuentes. Hugo Lindo died in San Salvador on September 9, 1985, at the age of 68 years. In 2005, the Reading Week VII of El Salvador was dedicated to his memory. In 2010, Dr. José Matías Delgado University commemorated 25 years since his death as a tribute.

His books are among the required readings in Salvadoran colleges.

== Legal works ==
As a lawyer, Lindo obtained the gold medal for his doctoral thesis entitled El divorcio en El Salvador (Divorce in El Salvador), and he published some reflections about the disintegration of the Organization of Central American States (OCAS) in La Integración Centroamericana ante el Derecho Internacional (Central American Integration at the International Law, 1971).

== Poetic works ==
He published the following collections of poems: Poema eucarístico y otros (Eucharistic Poem and Others, 1943), Libro de Horas (Book of Hours, 1948), Sinfonía del Límite (Symphony of the Limit, 1953), Trece instantes (Thirteen Instances, 1959), Varia Poesía (Varied Poetry, 1961), Navigate río (River Navigator, 1963), Maneras de llover (Ways of Raining, 1969), Este Pequeño Siempre, (This Small Always, 1971), Resonancia de Vivaldi (Resonance of Vivaldi, 1976), Aquí mi Tierra (Here is my Land, 1979), Fácil Palabra (Easy Word, 1985). After his death, he published various poems that he left as his living will, written feverishly as he neared his death, namely: Desmesura (Disturbance, 1992), Prólogo a la Noche (Prologue to the Night, 1999), and Casi en la luz (Almost in the Light, 1999). Additionally, three tomes of his complete collection of poetry were published in the name, Mañana Será el Asombro (Tomorrow will be in Astonishment), the first in 2006, the second in 2008, and the third in 2010.

== Narrative ==
He published the El Anzuelo de Dios (God's Hook, 1956), his best known work, ¡Justicia, Señor Gobernador! (Justice, Mr. Governor!, 1960), Cada día tiene su afán (Each Day has its Own Effort, 1965), and Yo soy la Memoria (I am Memory, 1983).
