= Ítalo López Vallecillos =

Salvadoran poet

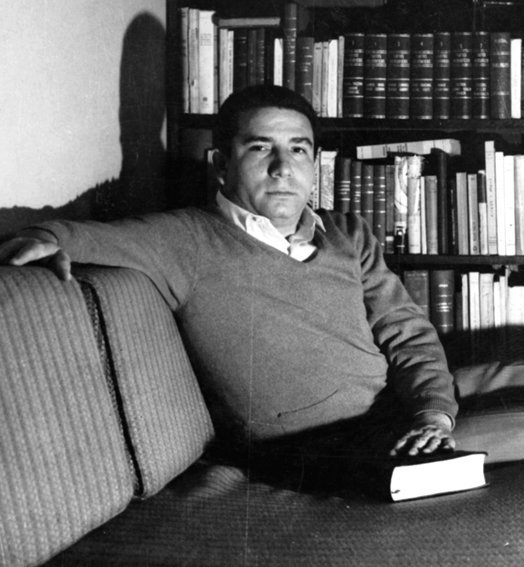
- Born: November 15, 1932; San Salvador
- Died: February 9, 1986; Mexico City
- Citizenship: Salvadoran
- Occupation: Journalist
- Writing career
- Language: Spanish
- Genre: Poetry

Ítalo López Vallecillos (November 15, 1932 – February 9, 1986) was a Salvadoran poet, historian, journalist and editor.

== Biography ==
He was the creator and guide of the mythical Committed Generation of El Salvador, to which Roque Dalton, Manlio Argueta and Álvaro Menen Desleal also belonged. He was editor of the newspaper El Independiente, which for two decades was attacked by military governments. In the early sixties, he created the Editorial Universitaria de El Salvador and the influential magazine La pájara pinta. At the beginning of the 1970s, he founded the Editorial Universitaria Centroamericana (EDUCA), which for almost thirty years made the most important writers of the region known.

== Works ==
- Biografía de un hombre triste (poetry, Madrid, 1954),
- Imágenes sobre el otoño (San Salvador, 1962),
- El periodismo en El Salvador (historic essay, San Salvador, 1964),
- Gerardo Barrios y su tiempo (historic essay, 1965),
- Burudi Sur (theater, San Salvador, 1965),
- Puro asombro (poetry, San Salvador, 1970),
- Inventario de soledad (poetry, San Salvador, 1977).
