= Diario Co Latino =

Salvadoran newspaper

- Type: Daily newspaper
- Format: Tabloid
- Owner: Sociedad Cooperativa de empleados de Diario Co Latino de R.L.
- Editor: Francisco Elías Valencia
- Founded: November 5, 1890
- Headquarters: San Salvador, EL Salvador
- Price: $0.25
- Website: diariocolatino.com

Diario Co Latino is an alternative newspaper, published in San Salvador, El Salvador. The editorial team is currently headed by Francisco E. Valencia.

== History ==
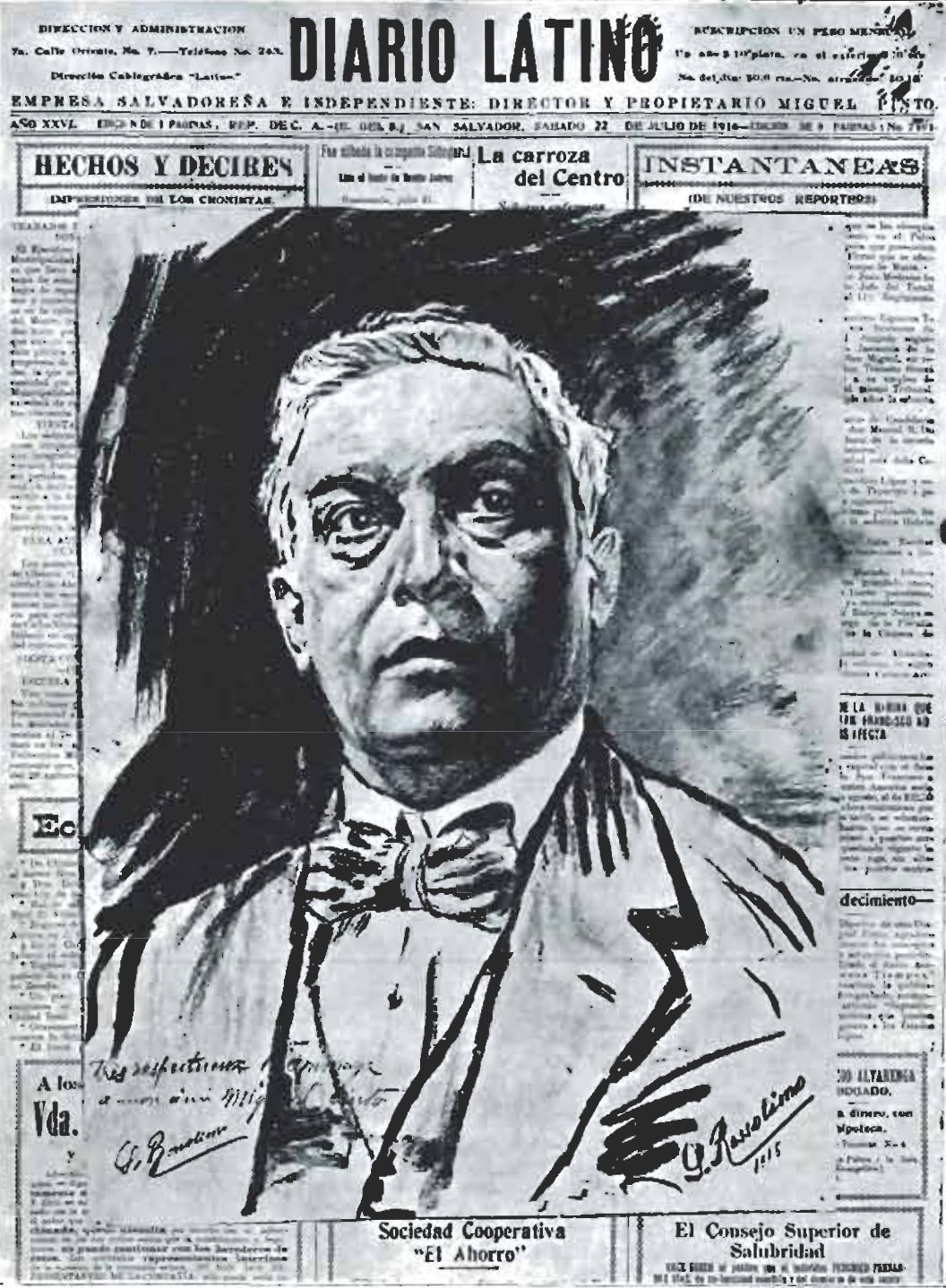
A 1916 publication of Diario Latino

The newspaper was founded November 5, 1890 by intellectual and journalist Miguel Pinto. Originally named Siglo XX (20th Century), it was soon renamed El Latinoamericano. After the editorial was destroyed by fire, the newspaper was revived under a new name of Diario Latino.

During the regime of the General Maximiliano Hernández Martínez, the newspaper was attacked and threatened by the military. Later the editorial was registered as Propiedad de Editora Salvadoreña de Periódicos, Revistas y Publicidad.

After the death of Miguel Pinto, his son, Miguel Angel Pinto, took charge of the newspaper and changed its format to tabloid. Like other newspapers of El Salvador founded in the 19th century by wealthy businessman, Diario Latino was conservative. After the death of Miguel Pinto, his son Miguel Angel Pinto sold the editorial to "H" Corporation of Adolfo Rey Prendes, who served as Minister of Culture and Communication in the government of Napoleón Duarte. Rey sold his shares on the company to the well known journalist Eduardo Vazquez Becker, but the newspaper has been negotiated by Nationalist Republican Alliance president Alfredo Cristiani with Farabundo Martí National Liberation Front. Diario Latino declared bankruptcy and was sequestered by Banco de Crédito Popular which passed it to the Fondo de Saneamiento y Fortalecimiento Financiero (FOSAFFI), an organ created by the Banco Central de Reserva.

In June 1989 its employees stopped receiving their pays, decided to organize and formed a union which took over operations, changing its name to Diario Co Latino. Its editorial line suffered a drastic change, from right-wing to a left-wing paper, becoming the most prominent left wing newspaper.

In February 1991 it suffered a terrorist attack by a right wing group, which set it on fire. The building was rebuilt by students from Universidad Nacional de El Salvador, with the help of loans and gifts from various organizations such as Oxfam or the Organización Internacional de Periodistas (OIP).

Its previous owner, Eduardo Vazquez-Becker, began editing a newspaper in 2009, naming it Diario Latino.

== Reputation ==
In 2010, the Diario Co Latino won the Spanish Freedom of Expression Prize from the Casa America Catalunya for writing investigative articles during El Salvador's civil war.

== Other newspapers in El Salvador ==
- El Diario de Hoy
- Diario El Mundo
- La Prensa Grafica
