= La Prensa Gráfica =

Salvadoran newspaper

La Prensa Grafica
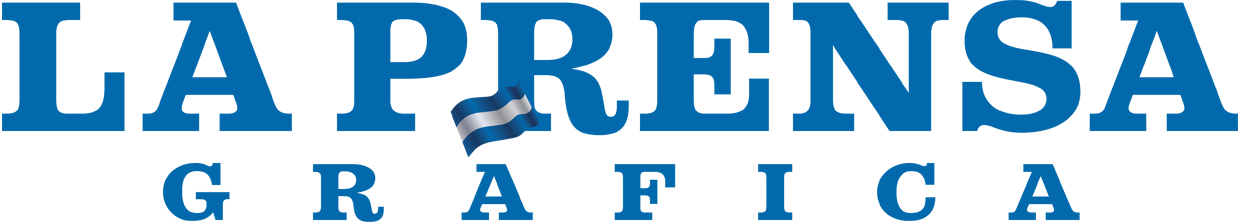
- Type: Daily newspaper
- Format: Tabloid
- Owner: Grupo Dutriz
- Publisher: Rodolfo Dutriz
- Editor: Jose Roberto Dutriz
- Founded: May 10, 1915; 110 years ago
- Headquarters: Antiguo Cuscatlan, La Libertad, El Salvador
- Website: www.laprensagrafica.com

La Prensa Gráfica, commonly known as La Prensa, is a daily newspaper published in El Salvador by Grupo Dutriz. La Prensa is a mainstream metropolitan newspaper, and became one of the first newspapers to print in color in Central America.

== History ==
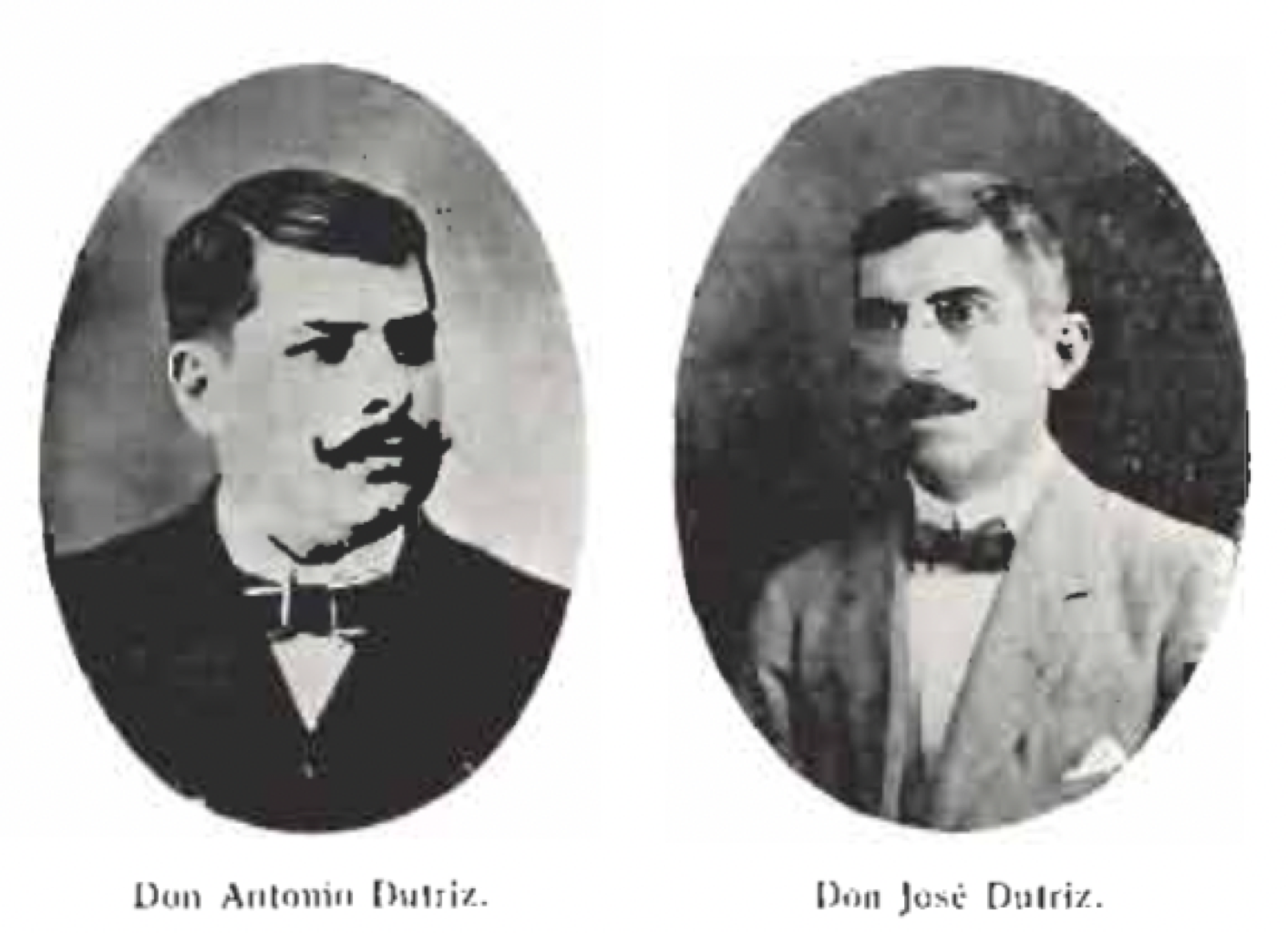
The founders of La Prensa Gráfica, Antonio and José Dutriz

Brothers Antonio and José Dutriz formed a commercial partnership known as Dutríz Hermanos on October 14, 1903. La Prensa was then founded by José and Antonio Dutriz, and its first issue was printed and distributed on May 10, 1915. The first issue had four standard size pages. The newspaper expanded and bought new equipment in 1916.

Antonio and José Dutriz were the first directors of the newspaper. Antonio retired in 1928 due to illness and José Dutriz remained as sole owner. José Dutriz retired in 1934 and the newspaper was then directed by Manuel Andino. José Quetglas became director of the newspaper on November 5, 1939, and merged the newspapers La Prensa and El Gráfico on August 9, 1939, The combined newspaper was then renamed La Prensa Gráfica.

During Quetglas' term as director, the newspaper had to deal with the issue of censorship under the government of General Maximiliano Hernández Martínez. The directors and owners of the newspaper encountered several problems under the Hernández Martínez government. José Dutriz, Jr. was incarcerated and Quetglas was being persecuted in an attempt to execute him. Quetglas went into exile and on April 2, 1944, Ramón Pleités became the acting director of the newspaper. Due to Quetglas repatriation, Pleités assumed the title of director on July 17, 1944. After the situation stabilized in El Salvador, José Dutriz Jr. became the director of the newspaper in 1951. During his term, Dutriz, Jr. introduced the use of classifieds and cartoon comics. Dutriz Jr. retired in 1986 and Rodolfo Dutriz became the new director of the newspaper.

A book published in 2002, titled "José Dutriz y el diario ‘La Prensa'" relates the history of the newspaper and its founder.

Television chain Univisión and La Prensa forged an alliance in 2004 to foster the exchange of information. Under this agreement, the newspaper will have direct transmission, via satellite, of its news to the United States.

== Today ==
La Prensa Gráfica currently costs US$0.50 and is one of the two biggest newspapers in El Salvador, the other being El Diario de Hoy. The Newspaper uses the Goodnews system of publishing. The current director of the newspaper is Rodolfo Dutriz, while the director of the Grupo Dutriz is José Roberto Dutriz.

== Columnists ==
- Alberto Arene
- Ana María Herrarte
- Carlos Alejandro Varaona
- Diego Recalde
- Rafael Castellanos
- Kalena de Velado
- Geovanny Vicente
- Ismael Cala
- Lionel Torielo Nájera
- Rodrigo Guerra y Guerra
- Rutilio Silvestri

== See also ==
- Diario Co Latino
- El Diario de Hoy
- El Mundo
- El Faro
