= José Roberto Cea =

Salvadoran novelist and poet

José Roberto Cea is a pre-eminent contemporary Salvadoran novelist and poet.

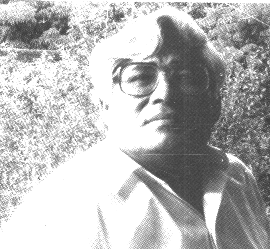
José Roberto Cea

Cea was born in the city of Izalco, department of Sonsonate, El Salvador, on April 10, 1939. He studied journalism and literature at the Universidad de El Salvador (UES), though he did not conclude his course of studies. He has served as the director of the editorial board of the UES, director or co-director of the journals "La Universidad" and "La Pájara Pinta," and has held several other positions related to the UES. Cea's literature has earned him several national and international literary prizes, among them:

- the International Poetry Award from the Circle of Ibero-American Poets and Writers of New York, 1965,
- the Prize September 15, of the Central American Contest of Sciences, Letters and Fine Arts, 1965 y 1966,
- the Poetry prize in the Latin American Pablo Neruda contest, Peru, 1974,
- the Rubén Darío International Award, 1981,
- and the First prize in the August floral games of San Salvador, 1998.

== Bibliography ==
Cea's works include the following:

- Los días enemigos, 1965 (poetry)
- Casi el encuentro, 1965 (poetry)
- De perros y hombres, 1968 (narrative)
- Códice de amor, 1968 (poetry)
- Naúfrago genuino, 1968 (poetry)
- Códice liberado, 1969 (poetry)
- Solitario de la habitación 5 guión 3, 1970 (narrative)
- El potrero, 1970 (poetry)
- Antología general de la poesía en El Salvador, 1971 (editor)
- Lecturas italianas, 1973 (poetry)
- Pocas i buenas, 1986 (poetry)
- Los herederos de farabundo, 1981 (poetry)
- Corral no, coral de los desplazados, 1986 (poetry)
- De la guanaxia irredenta, 1988 (narrative)
- Dime con quién andas y..., 1989 (narrative)
- Ninel se fue a la guerra, 1990 (narrative)
- La guerra nacional, 1992 (poetry)
- Cantar de los cantares y otros boleros, 1993 (poetry)
- En este paisito nos tocó y no me corro, 1995 (narrative)
- Misa mitin, 1998 (poetry)
- Todo el códice, 1998 (poetry)
