= Manlio Argueta =

Salvadoran writer, critic and novelist

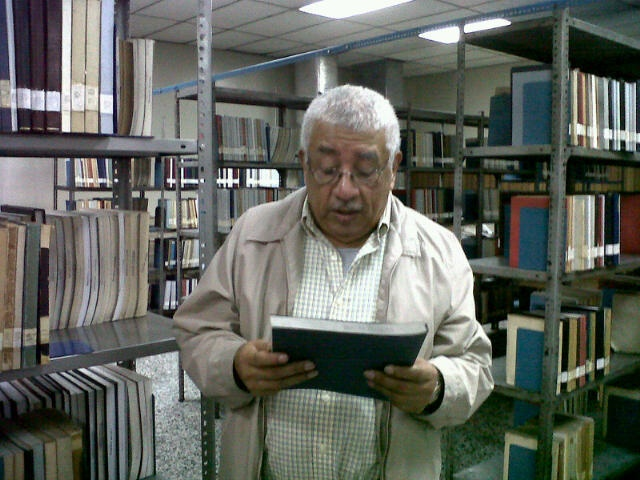
Manlio Argueta

Manlio Argueta (born 24 November 1935) is a Salvadoran writer, critic, and novelist. Although he is primarily a poet, he is best known in the English speaking world for his novel One Day of Life.

== Life ==
He was born in San Miguel, El Salvador on November 24, 1935. Argueta has stated that his exposure to “poetic sounds” began during his childhood and that his foundation in poetry stemmed from his childhood imagination. His writing career began with poetry produced at the age of thirteen. He was strongly influenced by the world literature he read as a teenager an cites Pablo Neruda and Federico García Lorca as his primary influences. He later studied law at the University of El Salvador, but concentrated on his poetic work.

In 1956, although he was relatively unknown at the time, he won first prize at the "Floral Games of San Miguel", sponsored by the Alberto Masferrer Society of Professors. During the sixties, he began to produce more fiction and became involved with the Committed Generation, a literary group with a leftist political orientation, founded by Ítalo López Vallecillos. All of its members were great admirers of Jean-Paul Sartre and existentialism. The group sought to create social change to benefit the "lower classes", but they also initiated a rediscovery of native cultural heritage. Roque Dalton was, perhaps, its best-known member.

Because of his writings criticizing the government, he was forced to go into self-exile in Costa Rica. He was there from 1972 until 1993 and worked primarily as a teacher. He also held guest professorships throughout North America and Europe, including the Chair of Contemporary Literature at San Francisco State University.

Since returning to El Salvador, he has held the position of "Director of National and International Relations" at the university. A characteristic of his writing style, present in the majority of his works, is the use of Salvadoran Spanish vernacular and slang. He considers this a way to express and preserve some of El Salvador's cultural identity.

== One Day of Life ==
Argueta is best known for his book One Day of Life, which has been translated into over 12 languages. The book takes the reader through one day of the life of Lupe, a grandmother in a small village of El Salvador. Although she is not very educated, she relates her personal observations, as well as accounts of friends and relatives, to paint a picture of the brutality with which the Salvadoran army treated the lower class during this time period. The following quote summarizes the sentiments of Lupe and the other peasants:

"The only thing we don’t have is rights. And as we began to arrive at this awareness, this place filled up with authorities wishing to impose order, omnipotent, with their automatics as they call them. From time to time they come to see how we are behaving, who has to be taken away, who has to be beaten to be taught a lesson."

Existentialism played a role in the novel and in Salvadoran history by counteracting religion, which had been used to oppress the masses by extolling the virtues of the meek and complacent. By accepting their role in life, the overworked and underpaid lower class would supposedly receive a place in heaven. But, through existentialism, the peasants come to realize that what matters is how they are treated in the present, as demonstrated in the quote:

"That is awareness, José would say. The soul also exists, he would tell me. It is of little importance to know where it is going. It is the soul of the people that lives here on earth."

Because of its negative portrayal of the Salvadoran government and its perceived ability to incite rebellious activity, One Day of Life was banned from El Salvador. Argueta had to publish his work from Argentina after fleeing to Costa Rica.

== Works ==
- Un hombre por la patria (poetry, Editorial Universitaria, San Salvador, 1968)
- En el costado de la luz (poetry, EU, San Salvador, 1968)
- El valle de las Hamacas (1970)
- Las bellas armas reales (1975)
- Caperucita en la zona roja (Casa de las Américas Prize 1977, various editions) / Little Red Riding Hood in the Red Light District (Curbstone Press, Connecticut, USA, 1999)
- Un día en la vida / One Day of Life (1980)
- Poesía de El Salvador (Manlio Argueta, Editor, 1983)
- Cuzcatlán, donde bate la mar del sur / Cuzcatlán, Where the Southern Sea Beats (1986)
- El Salvador (Adam Kufeld-photography, Arnoldo Ramos, Manlio Argueta-poetry, 1990)
- Magic Dogs of the Volcanoes/Los perros magicos de los volcanos (1990)
- Milagro de la Paz / A Place Called Milagro de la Paz (San Salvador, Istmo Editores, 1996)
- Siglo de O(G)ro (San Salvador, DPI, 1997) published as Once Upon a Time Bomb (2007)
- Poesia completa 1956-2005 (2005)
- El Cipitío (2006)
- Los Poetas del Mal (2013)

== See also ==
- Central American literature
