= Roque Dalton =

Salvadoran poet, essayist, journalist, communist activist and intellectual

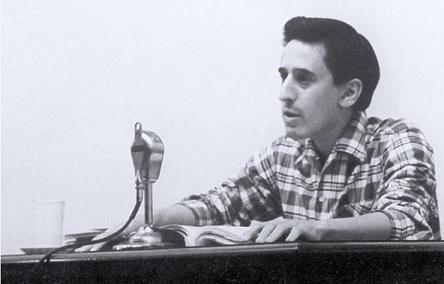
- Roque Dalton (1969)
- Born: Roque Antonio Dalton García; 14 May 1935; San Salvador, El Salvador
- Died: 10 May 1975 (aged 39); Quezaltepeque, El Salvador
- Spouse: Aída Cañas
- Children: 3
- Writing career
- Notable awards: Casa de las Américas (1969); Central American Prize of Poetry (1956, 1958, 1959, 1964); Hijo Meritísimo de El Salvador

Roque Antonio Dalton García (14 May 1935 – 10 May 1975), known professionally as Roque Dalton, was a Salvadoran poet, essayist, journalist, political activist, and intellectual. He is considered one of Latin America's most compelling poets and one of the greatest Salvadoran writers of the 20th century.

The son of an American émigré and a Salvadoran nurse, he attended the University of Chile and the University of El Salvador, where he studied law. While at the latter, he began writing poetry, founded the University Literary Circle with Guatemalan poet Otto René Castillo, and associated with other members of the Committed Generation. A Marxist-Leninist, he joined the Communist Party of El Salvador in 1957 and visited the Soviet Union in the same year. He was subsequently arrested for inciting revolt during the presidency of José María Lemus.

After his imprisonment, Dalton lived in exile in Cuba, where he developed his career as a writer and most of his poetry was published. He later served as a correspondent for The International Review: Problems of Peace and Socialism based out of Prague, and in 1969 won the Casa de las Américas Poetry Prize for his book Taberna y Otros Lugares.

In the final years of his life Dalton returned to El Salvador and became involved in the armed struggle against the government, joining the People's Revolutionary Army (ERP) in 1973. For his criticisms of ERP leadership, he was executed by his peers in 1975. Posthumously, he has been recognized as Hijo Meritísimo and Poeta Meritísimo by the Salvadoran government and received an honorary doctorate degree from the University of El Salvador in 2012.

== Early life and education ==
Dalton was the son of Winnall Dalton and María García Medrano. Winnall Dalton emigrated to Mexico, and came to El Salvador in the early 1920s. Winnall Dalton married Aida Ulloa, and gaining control of his wife's large farm dedicated his life to agriculture. He survived an assassination attempt. The nurse who took care of Winnall Dalton in the Salvadoran hospital, María García Medrano, later gave birth to Roque Dalton. Her hard work and good luck allowed her to provide their children a high-quality education.

Roque graduated from Externado San José, an exclusive Jesuit school for boys in San Salvador. Afterwards he was sent by his father to Santiago, Chile to study law in the Universidad de Chile. There, he established close relationships to leftist students and attended lectures with the Mexican artist Diego Rivera. Around this time, he developed a great interest in socialism.

When he returned to El Salvador, he was accepted by the law school of the Universidad de El Salvador (UES), and in 1955 he and the Guatemalan poet Otto René Castillo founded Círculo Literario Universitario, which published some of Central America's most recognized literary figures.

== Writing and political career ==
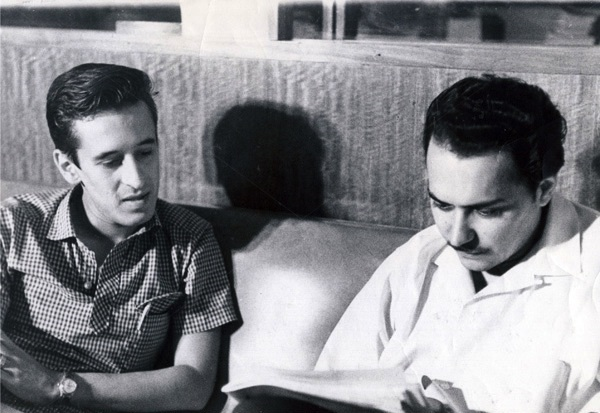
Roque Dalton and Cuban Fayad Jamís, in the newsroom of the newspaper Hoy in 1962.

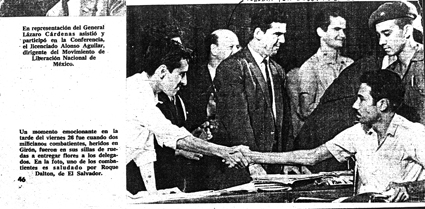
Roque shaking hands with combatants during the conference of the people.

In 1961 he travelled to Havana, where he was welcomed by Casa de las Américas, a gathering place for many exiled leftist Latin American writers. Dalton returned clandestinely to El Salvador in 1965 but was soon caught and taken prisoner. He awaited execution in Cojutepeque, but was miraculously saved. There was an earthquake and the wall of his prison cell fell down. Dalton took advantage of this and escaped. He slipped into a passing religious procession and managed to meet his fellow revolutionaries, who helped him escape to Cuba again. He was then sent to Prague as a correspondent for The International Review: Problems for Peace and Socialism. While in Prague, he wrote his internationally acclaimed Taberna y Otros Lugares. He also produced a landmark biography of Miguel Mármol, a prominent Salvadoran communist who had participated in the 1932 Salvadoran peasant uprising and was living in exile in Prague.

In 1970, Roque Dalton had become a recognized figure in the Salvadoran left. He tried hard to become a revolutionary soldier, for which reason he participated in military training camps in Cuba several times. He once wrote, "Politics are taken up at the risk of life, or else you don't talk about it".

Roque Dalton (1937–75) was the major literary figure and an important political architect of the revolutionary movement in El Salvador. Dalton represents a new type of Latin American writer: no longer the genial 'fellow traveler' of the revolution, like Pablo Neruda, but rather the rank and file revolutionary activist for whom the intricate cabbala of clandestine struggle—passwords, safe houses, escape routes, forged documents, sectarian squabbles—was as familiar as Parisian surrealism. A dangerous and difficult profession, in which the event that seals a writer's reputation is often precocious martyrdom.

When he felt properly trained as a soldier, he sought admission to the Salvadoran Marxist-Leninist, political-military organization Farabundo Martí National Liberation Front. However, the organization's leader, Commander "Marcial" (whose real name was Salvador Cayetano Carpio), rejected his application, arguing that Roque's role in the revolution was as a poet, and not as a foot-soldier. Because of this, he applied to join the ERP - Ejército Revolucionario del Pueblo- (People's Revolutionary Army in English). Though Dalton himself was not allowed to become part of the FPL, both his sons joined the FPL in the late 1970s. Roque Dalton's military career also included cooperation with Guatemalan revolutionaries in creating EGP - Ejército Guerrillero de los Pobres (Guerrilla Army of the Poor in English).

== Assassination by the ERP ==
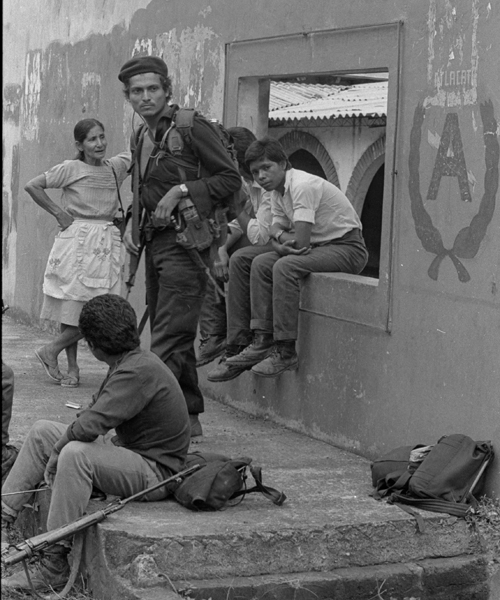
ERP combatants Perquín 1990

Once an active member in ERP, Dalton stressed the importance of establishing bonds with organizations from civil society. Some of the other members of ERP disagreed with him. They accused him of trying to divide the organization. This group, whose most internationally known leader was Joaquín Villalobos ("Atilio"), allegedly condemned him to death on 10 May 1975, four days before Roque was to turn 40. Therefore, Dalton's literary production stopped when a group of commandos, whose members were Villalobos and Jorge Meléndez (nom de guerre 'Jonas') ended his life. This commando was sent by Edgar Alejandro Rivas Mira. Roque was shot to death in a house in the Santa Anita neighbourhood in San Salvador. There were possibly others involved in his execution, but these are the ones still alive today: Villalobos settled in Great Britain; Meléndez was an MP for San Salvador for the FMLN, and Rivas Mira hides behind plastic surgeries, which were paid with money obtained from the kidnapping and murder of the multi-millionaire Roberto Poma. The most commonly accepted version of facts suggests that Dalton was "mistakenly accused" of operating as an agent for the CIA, the reason for which he was executed.

In 1975, he was back in El Salvador working in the underground. This was a difficult time for the revolutionary movement, and Dalton's own organization, the ERP, was torn by a bitter factional fight. Dalton criticized the organization's military adventurism and argued the need to build a mass base. Under circumstances that still remain obscure, he was accused of complicity with the CIA and assassinated by members of a rival faction of the ERP.

== Recent developments ==
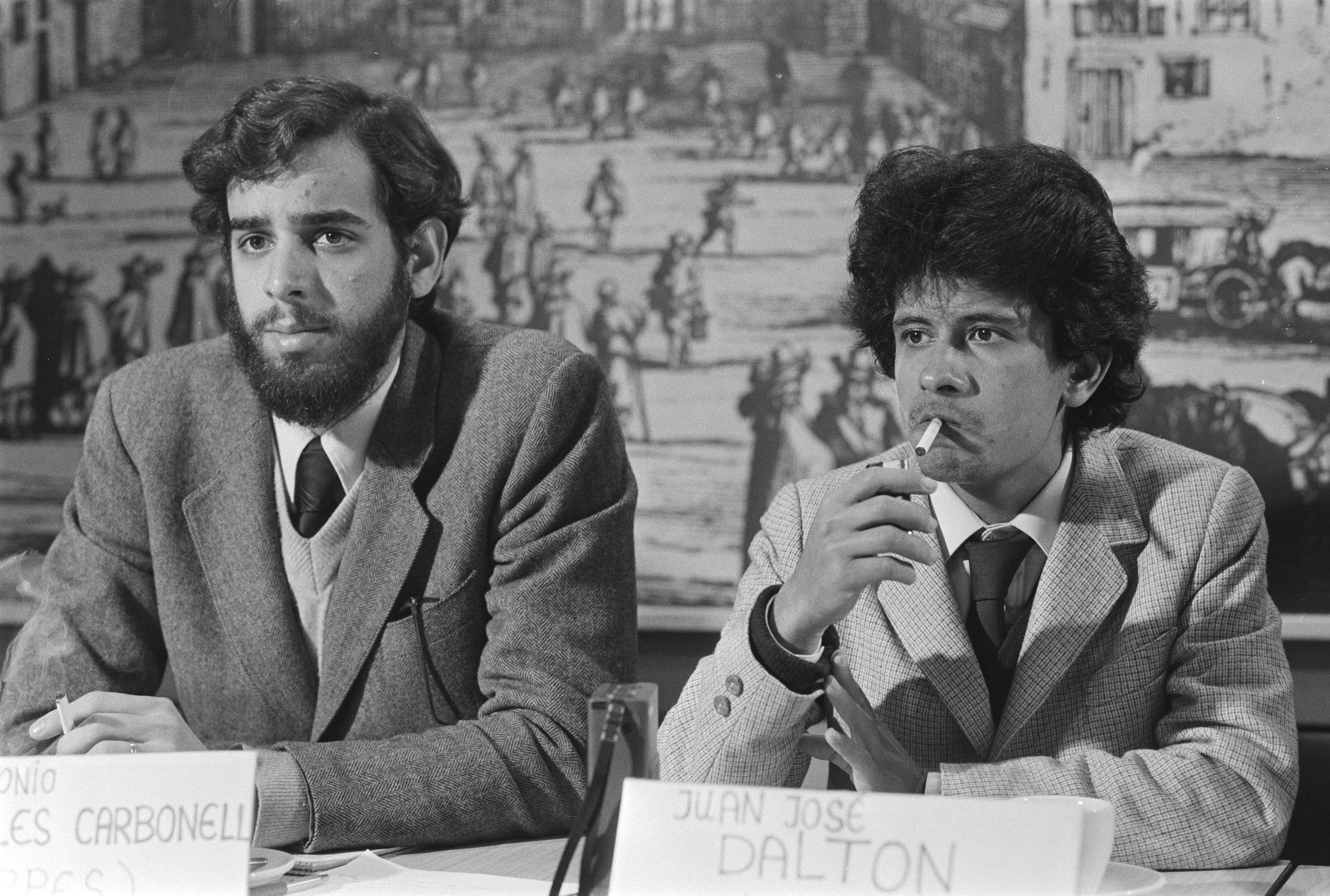
Press conference of the Committee of Political Prisoners of El Salvador; left the son of Roque Dalton who sought justice for the murder of his father

On May 4, 2010, the magazine Contrapunto published an interview with Jorge Meléndez, at the time the director of Civil Protection, and known during the civil war as Commander Jonas. During the interview he said with respect to the murder, “I was there and know that which transpired there.” Although the comments by Tomás André, the correspondent for Contrapunto who conducted the interview are not known, the historical importance of the interview can be certainly discerned by the depth and extraordinary nature of the encounter that Melendez was well aware of the nature of the process that resulted in the assassination of Dalton and his friend Pancho. To those who knew the author, the answer by Roque Dalton to the statements by this man could be easily imagined. What is clear is that Roque Dalton would have not been displeased if anyone had then said that even now, the murderers are afraid of him, and that the accusations of CIA collaboration were then and now a simple after the fact excuse of a group of terrorists fully aware of the hideous nature of their acts. ("Yo, Roque Dalton", 2012).

On January 7, 2012, the Fiscalía Nacional, prosecuting agency for the FMLN lead Salvadoran government, decree that the statute of limitations for the murder of Roque Dalton had expired. Juan José Dalton said of the act “Villalobos gave an interview where he states who made the decision to kill [my father]: Vladimir Rogel, [Jorge] Meléndez [y Villalobos]. That would be enough in any decent nation of this planet for a prosecutor to proceed.”

== Legacy ==
Dalton's writing includes almost 15 poetry collections, a novel, a personal testimony, and a play, as well as short stories, critiques, and essays on both literature and politics. Some of his poetry has been translated to English, French, Czech, Russian and Italian. According to Luis Melgar Brizuela, he had the greatest influence from 1967 until the end of the Salvadoran Civil War in 1992. This was especially the case in leftist literary and intellectual groups, among them the literary groups Piedra y Siglo, La Masacuata and Xibalbá, as well as in the content of the magazines Abra and Taller de Letras, published by José Simeón Cañas Central American University, the Literary Supplement 3000 in the Diario Co Latino, Amate, and La Universidad.

== Trivia ==
- Roque Dalton is currently featured on Salvadoran postage stamps.
- According to a legend, Roque Dalton underwent plastic surgery. He did this in order to be able to return clandestinely to El Salvador. According to the Salvadoran writer Claribel Alegría, he had to disguise his long nose and flapping ears. He grew a moustache, started using eyeglasses and went around with a different hairdo.
- Roque Dalton was already politically active in El Salvador when the Cuban revolution started in 1959. This year he was arrested and was allegedly sentenced to be executed by a firing squad. The day before his execution, Colonel José María Lemus was overthrown from the presidency, and because of this, Dalton's life was spared. Once he was freed from prison, he travelled to Mexico in exile and wrote much of the material that appeared in his books El Turno del Ofendido and La Ventana en el Rostro
- Roque Dalton is credited with the following quote: "Poetry, like bread, is for everyone."
- Roque Dalton's "Poema de Amor" (Love Poem) is the most popular poem among the Salvadoran community abroad. Many of his poems have been put into songs. Dalton's "Poema de Amor" was musicalized by the group Yolocamba Ita. and Bohemia
- Roque Dalton's two sons, Roquito (i.e. Roque Dalton Jr.) and Juan José (also known as "El Vaquerito"), joined the FPL and were founding members of the FMLN in 1980. Juan José (whose FPL nom-de-guerre was Joaquin) had the honor to have the main speech on the FMLN's founding parade in Cuba. The other orator during the parade was supposed to be Commander Fidel Castro, but due to security reasons, the speech was delegated to Division General Arnaldo Ochoa.
- The short story "Yo, Roque Dalton" is the latest published work of the author, although he has been dead for almost 40 years, the story is the poet's response to an interview by one of his alleged murderers. A tale of a poet's ghost in Habana Salvadoran short story.
- The prose piece "The Unforgivable" (May 10) by Eduardo Galeano in his book Children of the Days: A Calendar of Human History recounts the assassination of Roque Dalton.
- Roque Dalton is mentioned in a poem by Allen Ginsberg, “On the Conduct of the World Seeking Beauty Against Government.”

== Bibliography ==
=== Poetry ===
- Mía junto a los pájaros, San Salvador,1957
- La ventana en el rostro, México, 1961
- El mar, La Habana, 1962
- El turno del ofendido, La Habana, 1962
- Los testimonios, La Habana, 1964
- Poemas. Antología, San Salvador, 1968
- Taberna y otros lugares, Premio Casa de las Américas, La Habana, 1969
- Los pequeños infiernos, Barcelona, 1970
- In Translation to English: "Small Hours of the Night", translated by Jonathan Cohen, James Graham, Ralph Nelson, Paul Pines, Hardie St. Martin and David Unger. Edited by Hardie St. Martin, Curbstone Press, 1997.

=== Essays ===
- "César Vallejo", La Habana, 1963
- "El intelectual y la sociedad", 1969
- "¿Revolución en la revolución? y la crítica de la derecha", La Habana, 1970
- "Un libro rojo para Lenin", La Habana, 1970
- "Miguel Mármol y los sucesos de 1932 en El Salvador", 1972
- "Las historias prohibidas del Pulgarcito", México, 1974
- "El Salvador (monografia)" UCA Editores.

=== Fiction ===
- Pobrecito poeta que era yo, San Salvador: UCA Editores, 1994, 2005
