= LLP (disambiguation) =

LLP stands for limited liability partnership, a partnership in which some or all partners have limited liabilities.

LLP may also refer to:

- Limited liability partnerships in the United Kingdom
- The Limited Liability Partnership Act, 2008 (LLP Act) of India
- LLP Group, a Czech holding company
- Long Lap Penalty, a MotoGP penalty introduced in the 2019 MotoGP World Championship

== See also ==
- LLLP
- LP (disambiguation)
- LPP (disambiguation)
- PPL (disambiguation)
- PLL (disambiguation)
