= Antonia Ramírez =

Salvadoran singer and language activist (died 2024)

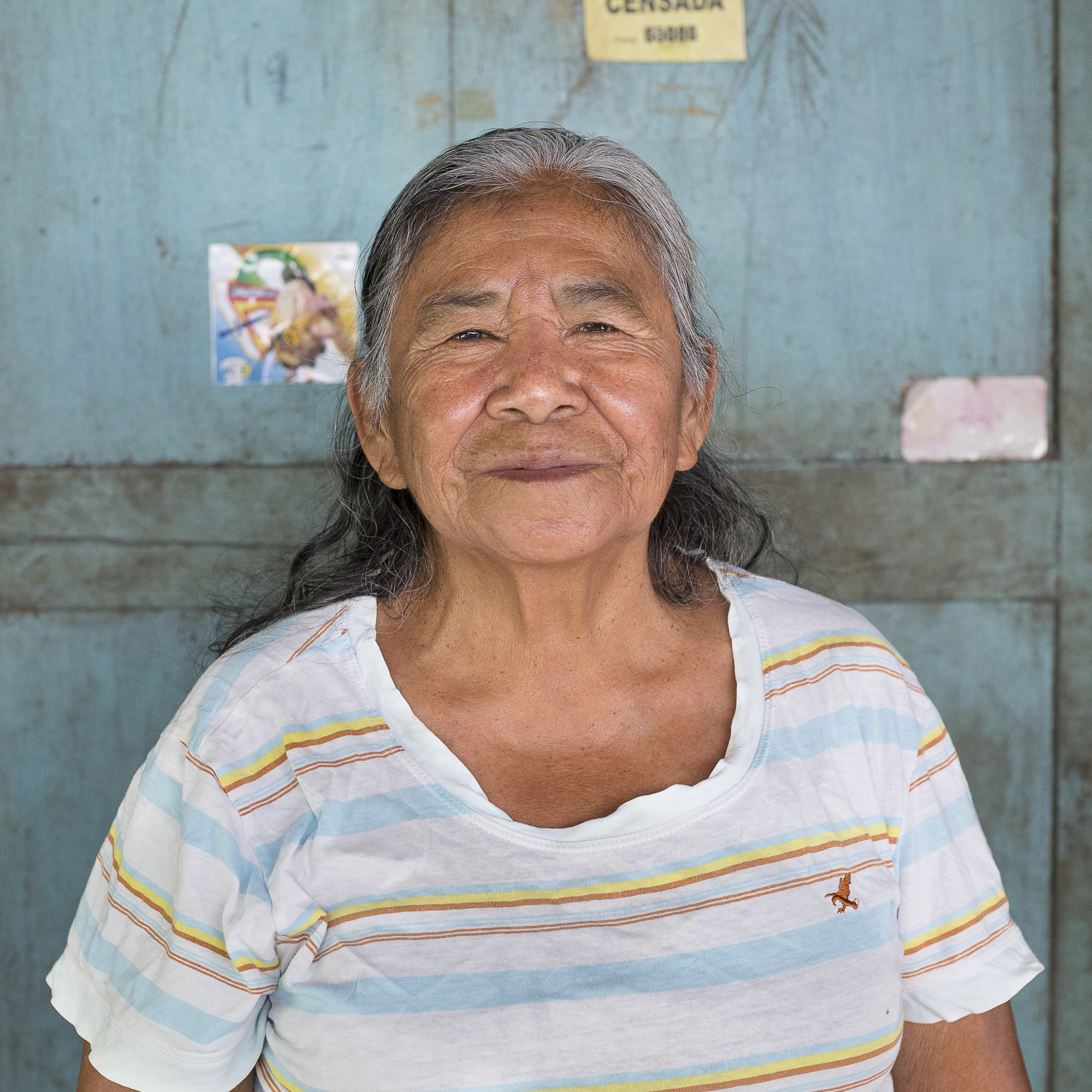
- Died: 11 June 2024; Santo Domingo de Guzmán, El Salvador
- Occupations: Singer, composer, writer and indigenous language activist

Antonia Ramírez (died 11 June 2024) was a Pipil Salvadoran singer, composer, writer and indigenous language activist as a native speaker of the endangered Uto-Aztecan Nawat language of El Salvador and Nicaragua.

== Biography ==
Ramírez was born in Santo Domingo de Guzmán; her birthdate is unknown. She spoke the Nawat and Spanish languages, learning Nawat from her grandmother Juana. She was a Catholic.

Ramírez composed the Nawat language song "Ne nawat shuchikisa" (Nahaut blossoms), which followed a classical structure and featured easily remembered melody and chorus. The song became known as the "anthem of Nahua," was used by language teachers with their students and was sung at cultural events. Ramírez was filmed singing the song for documentaries and in 2014 she was invited to sing in front of an audience at the Mexican Embassy in San Salvador.

Ramírez coordinated the Casa de la Cultura de Santo Domingo de Guzmán. She also published the choral songbook Ne nawat shuchikisa (Nahaut blossoms), which compiled musical creations of the Pipil people of El Salvador.

Ramírez died on 11 June 2024 in Santo Domingo de Guzmán. At the time of her death, there were 48 native Nawat speakers.
