= Pipil =

Pipil may refer to:

- Nahua people of western El Salvador
- Pipil language (Nawat)
  - Pipil grammar
  - Pipil language (typological overview)
