= PPL =

PPL or ppl may refer to:

== Companies and organizations ==
=== Sports leagues ===
- Pakistan Premier League, football league
- Pohnpei Premier League, top division association football league in Pohnpei, Federated States of Micronesia
- Prairies Premier League, a Canadian soccer league
- Pro Panja League, an Indian arm wrestling competition
- Provo Premier League, top division association football tournament in Turks and Caicos

=== Other companies and organizations ===
- Huhtamaki PPL, India packaging manufacturer
- Phonographic Performance Limited, a British-based music licensing and performance rights organisation
- PPL Corporation, an American energy company
- PPL India, an Indian collective-rights management organization
- Puskarich Public Library System, a rural public library serving Harrison County, Ohio

== Places ==
- PPL Building, an office building in Allentown, Pennsylvania
- PPL Center, a sports arena in Allentown, Pennsylvania

== Science and technology ==
- PPL (gene)
- Polymorphic Programming Language

== Other uses ==
- Paid Parental Leave, condition of employment in Australia
- Private pilot licence
- ppl, short for "people"
- Nawat language (ISO 639-3 code "ppl", from Pipil)
- Pure Prairie League, a country-rock group

== See also ==
- Participle
