= LPP =

LPP may refer to:

- LPP (company), a Polish clothing retailer
- LPP (gene)
- Labor-Progressive Party, Canadian Communist Party from 1943 to 1959
- Laboratoire de Phonétique et Phonologie, a French laboratory
- Labour Party Pakistan
- Latvia's First Party
- Legal professional privilege
- Legitimate peripheral participation, how newcomers become old-timers in a community of practice
- Lembaga Penyiaran Publik, a form of public broadcasting in Indonesia
- Length between perpendiculars, a ship measurement
- Liberian People's Party
- Liverpool Protestant Party, UK political party
- Living Planet Programme, ESA Earth observation programme
- Ljubljanski potniški promet, a public transport company in Slovenia
- Lappeenranta Airport in Finland, by IATA code
- Lynestrenol phenylpropionate, a progestin that was never marketed
- Low-fade positive print, a type of archival color motion picture film
