= Nahuizalco =

Municipality in El Salvador

Coordinates: 13°47′N 89°44′W

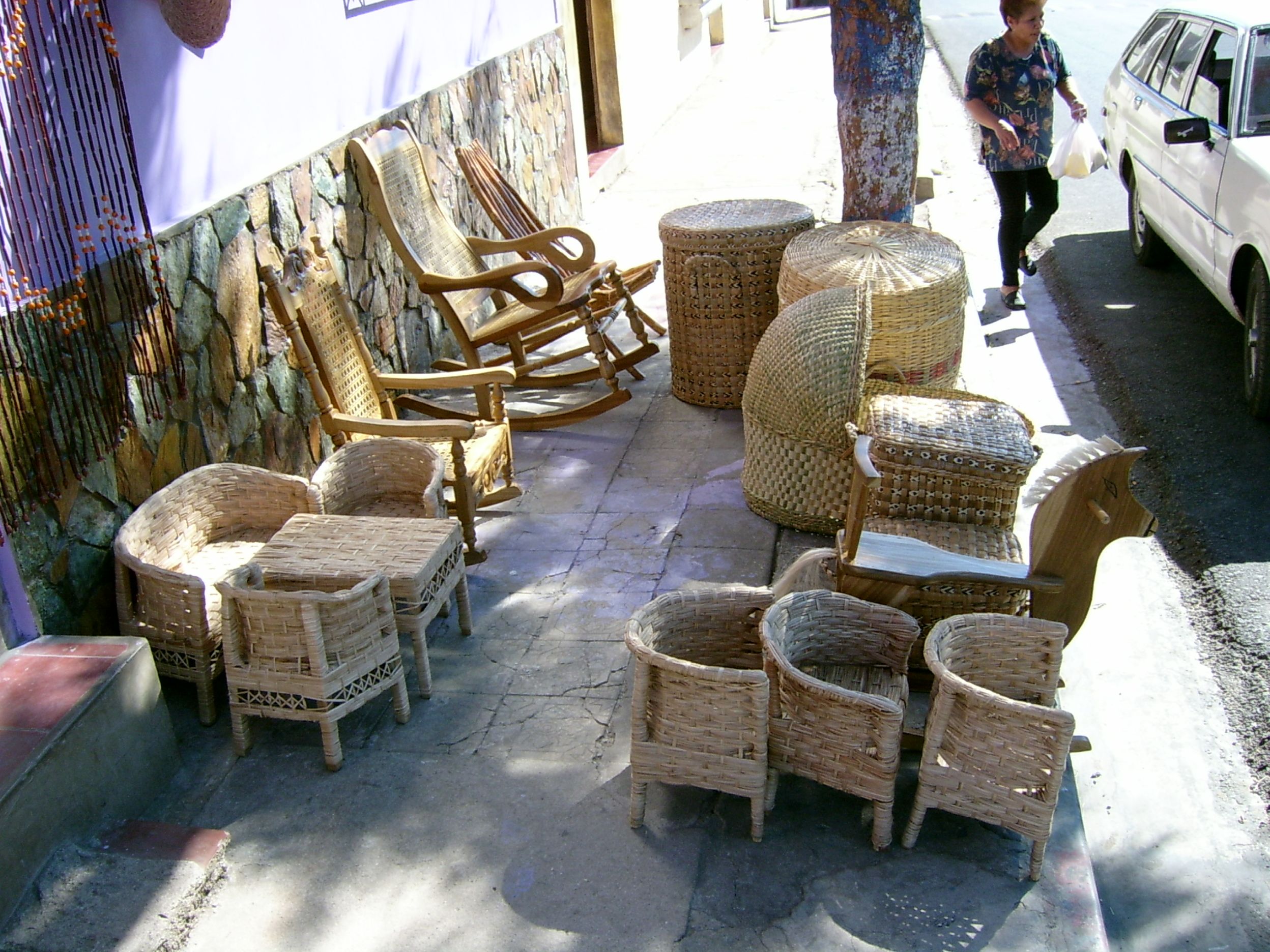
Local wicker furniture on sale in the street of Nahuizalco

Nahuizalco is a municipality in the Sonsonate department of El Salvador. It lies on the "flowers route" (Ruta de las Flores), 9 km from Sonsonate and 74 km from San Salvador, at 540 m above sea level on the southern part of the Apaneca-Ilamatepec mountain range. Per the population and housing census of 2007, Nahuizalco has 49,081 residents.

There are strong indigenous customs. Its name in Nawat language means "place of four Izalcos "; by tradition, it was founded by four families from the nearby town of Izalco. It is famous for its wicker and tule handcrafts. Tule is processed in two different varieties: the water kind, brought from the Pacific coast, and the dark one used for making "petates" (floor mats). Nahuizalco is also famous for its night market. The streets are lit only by candles and the products made of wicker and tule are sold until 10pm.

The colonial church was seriously damaged during the earthquake of 2001 and subsequently restored. The church honors John the Baptist every June 20–25.

It is a birthplace of poets Alfredo Alvarado, Carlos Arturo Imendia and nurse Julia Torres.

== History ==
Nauhizalco is a village of pre-European colonial origin. It was originally inhabited by the Pipil people, and in colonial times, the region was part of the Izalco province. A chronicle in 1586 estimated that there were less than 200 people living in Nahuizalco.

In 1771, a letter from Pedro Cortés y Larraz, archbishop of the Guatemalan diocese, Nahuizalco is named as the head of the parish of "Nahuisalco". The parish joined three churches, namely Santa Catharina Masahuat, San Pedro Putxla, and Santo Domingo Huitzampam, and had a herd of cattle. In the same document a description is given of the people of Nahuizalco. There was a population of 2,790 "Indians" divided into 825 families and a population of 190 "ladinos" divided into 41 families.

From 1821 to 1823, Nahuizalco was part of the state of Guatemala, and in 1824 it became part of the department of Sonsonate. The people of Nahuizalco were known for the large support that they offered to the campaigns of Francisco Morazán during the years of the Federal Republic of Central America. In 1856, a municipal report recorded the population as 4,983 people. In 1932, peasant uprisings damaged the town. Years later, in 1955, Nahuizalco was given the title of city.

Recognition initiatives formed by the indigenous peoples, who fought for official status led to the city government of Nahuizalco drafting a municipal ordinance called the Rights of the Established Indigenous Communities in the Municipality of Nahuizalco (published in the official journal on July 6, 2011, Núm.126 Tomo 392). This ordinance, recognizing the rights of indigenous peoples, was the first of its kind in the history of El Salvador.

== Bibliography ==
- Instituto Geográfico Nacional (1986). Diccionario Geográfico de El Salvador, Tomo II, L-Z. San Salvador: Talleres Litográficos del Instituto Geográfico Nacional.
- Larín, Jorge Larde (2000). El Salvador, historia de sus pueblos, villas y ciudades. San Salvador: Concultura, 2000.
