= LP =

LP or lp may refer to:

== Businesses and organizations ==
- LP, Limited partnership in corporate law or a Limited Partner in a venture capital fund

=== In politics ===
- Labour Party (disambiguation), in several countries
- Liberal Party, in several countries
- Libertarian Party (United States), or a member thereof
- Liberty Party (disambiguation), in several countries

=== Schools ===
- Lycée professionnel, French vocational high schools
- Lower Primary school, a subdivision of primary schools in certain places
- Lorne Park Secondary School, a high school in Mississauga, Ontario, Canada

=== Other businesses and organizations ===
- Ladakh Police, police agency of Ladakh, India
- LAN Perú, an airline based in Lima, Peru (IATA code LP)
- Liberapay
- LivePerson, a software company producing AI chatbots
- Lonely Planet, travel publisher
- Louisiana-Pacific, a manufacturer of building materials
- lowercase people, an organization founded by rock band Switchfoot

== Science, technology, philosophy ==
=== Computing and mathematics ===
- lp (Unix), command for printing documents
- L^{p} space
  - ℓ^{p} space
- LPMud, a type of virtual world server software created in 1989
- LP or lp, the device name for a printer in some computer operating systems
  - A legacy abbreviation derived from line printer but now used for other types of printer
- Larch Prover, an automated theorem proving system
- Linear programming, in applied mathematics
- LivePerson, a software company producing AI chatbots
- Logic programming

=== Medicine and psychology ===
- Licensed Psychologist
- Lumbar puncture, a diagnostic and, at times, therapeutic procedure, that is performed to collect a sample of cerebrospinal fluid

=== Other uses in science and technology ===
- Liquefied petroleum gas, a hydrocarbon gas mixture
- Liquid propane
- Low power electronics
- Low-power broadcasting, in radio and TV broadcasting
- Low precipitation supercell, a subtype of highly organized thunderstorm
- Lower Paleolithic, an archaeological period
- Sound pressure level, Lp
- Luyten-Palomar, astronomical survey catalog of high proper motion stars (LP numbers). L in zones -45 to -89 deg.; LP in zones +89 to -44 deg. See Star catalogue#Proper motion catalogues

=== Philosophy ===
- Logic of Paradox, a paraconsistent logic

== Music ==
=== Albums ===
- LP (Ambulance LTD album), 2004
- LP (Discovery album), 2009
- LP (Holy Fuck album), 2007
- LP (Insomniac Folklore album), 2010
- LP!, by JPEGMafia, 2021
- LP1 (FKA Twigs album), 2014
- LP1 (Liam Payne album), 2019
- LP (Landon Pigg album), 2006
- The LP, by Large Professor, 1996
- L.P. (The Rembrandts album), 1995
- LP (Soviettes album), 2003

=== Other uses in music ===
- LP record, a long-playing 12- or 10-inch (30 or 25 cm) vinyl record that spins at 33⅓ rpm
- Latin Percussion, a brand of percussion instruments
- Gibson Les Paul, electric guitar
- Linkin Park, an American rock band from Agoura Hills, California

== People ==
- LP (singer) (born 1981), American indie pop singer
- El-P (born 1975), American rapper
- Laxmikant–Pyarelal (1940–1998), Indian music director duo
- Liam Payne (1993–2024), English singer and member of One Direction
- Lil Peep (1996–2017), American rapper and singer-songwriter
- Vale LP (born 1999), Italian singer-songwriter and rapper

== Other uses ==
- Lateral pass, in gridiron football
- Lesson plan, a teacher's detailed description of the course of instruction for a class
- Let's Play, a style of video series documenting the playthrough of a video game
- Liquidity provider, in finance
- Listening post, a facility established to monitor radio and microwave signals
- Little person, someone affected by dwarfism
- Lower Peninsula of Michigan
- United Nations laissez-passer, a travel document issued by the United Nations to its staff
