= Alan R. King =

British linguist (1954–2019)

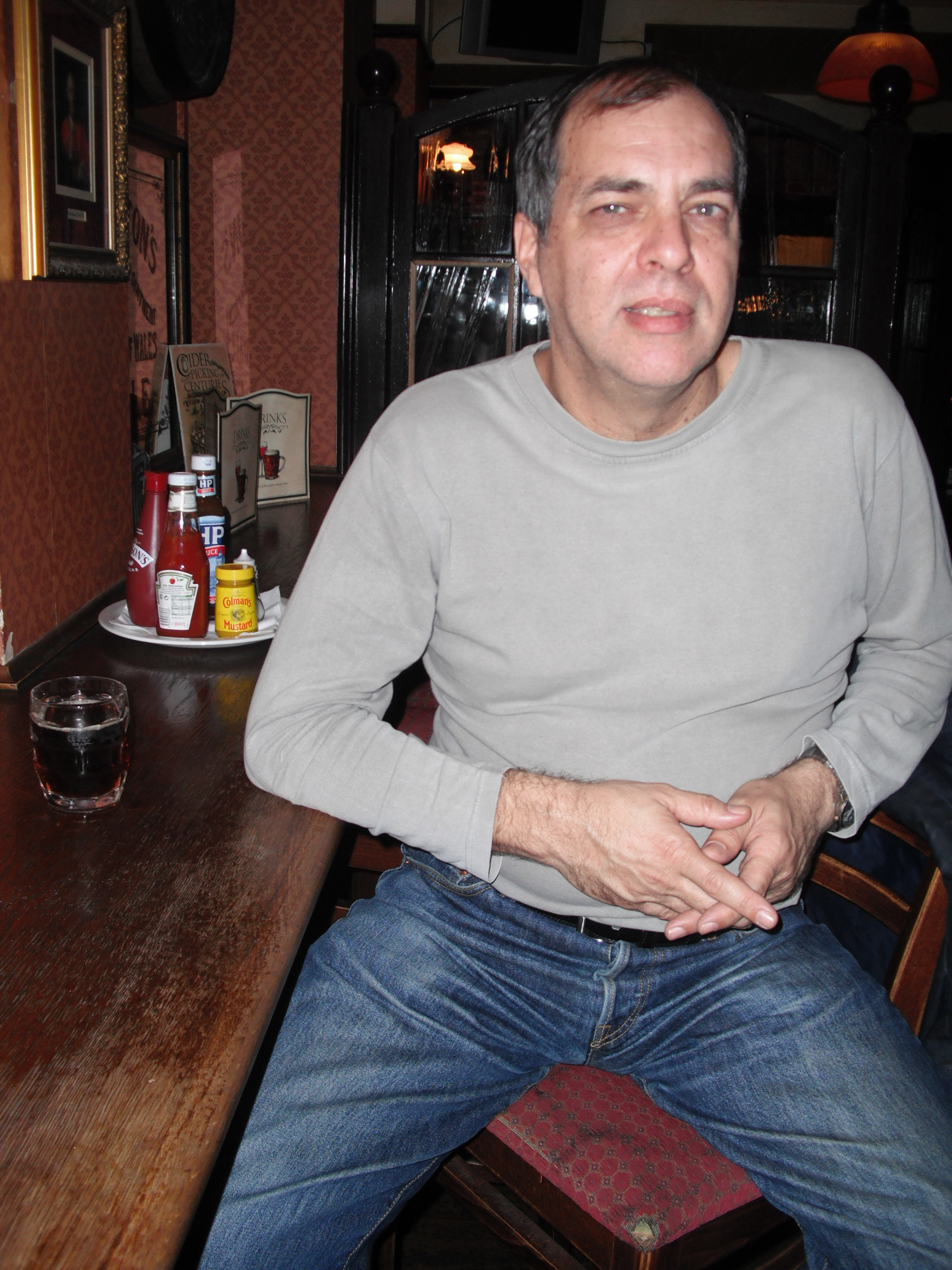
- King in London, October 2009
- Born: 24 October 1954; St. Annes-on-Sea, Lancashire, England
- Died: 19 February 2019 (aged 64); Zarautz, Gipuzkoa, Basque Country, Spain
- Resting place: Donosti
- Children: One daughter

Academic background
- Education: Queen Mary, University of London
- Thesis: Communicative Grammar of the Basque Verb (Selected Aspects) (1993)

Academic work
- Main interests: Basque, Nawat, Lenca
- Website: web.archive.org/web/20190221163156/http://www.alanrking.info/

Alan Roy King (24 October 1954 – 19 February 2019) was a British linguist notable for his work on minority languages Basque and Nawat. He was an independent scholar engaged in grammatical description, language recovery, teaching material development and translation projects for Basque, Nawat (Pipil, Central America) and Lencan (Central America). King was Member of the Grammar Committee of the Royal Academy of the Basque Language (Euskaltzaindia) since 1985 and Corresponding member since 2003.

King's parents were born in London and his grandparents were Jewish immigrants from Eastern Europe. He grew up in England until he was thirteen, then in California, and then back in Europe. When he was twenty-five, he moved to the Basque Country, and since then he lived there, in Gipuzkoa, although he spent some time abroad, such as in England, Catalonia, Wales and El Salvador (Central America). His mother and brother live in Hawaii and he also spent time there. Languages were his main hobby. His areas of interest were linguistics (the study of how they "work"), grammar (how to describe them) and applied linguistics (how to teach languages).

King spoke and communicated in English, Welsh, French, Basque, Spanish, Catalan, Galician, Nawat, Hawaiian, Hebrew, Yiddish and Lenca.

== Early life ==
King was born in Saint Annes-on-Sea, a small, elegant seaside resort on the northwest coast of England. His parents, both Londoners who had evacuated as teenagers with their parents when they had lost their homes in the bombing of London during World War II. His parents met, married and settled their family in Lancashire. His parents owned a jewelry shop in Blackpool.

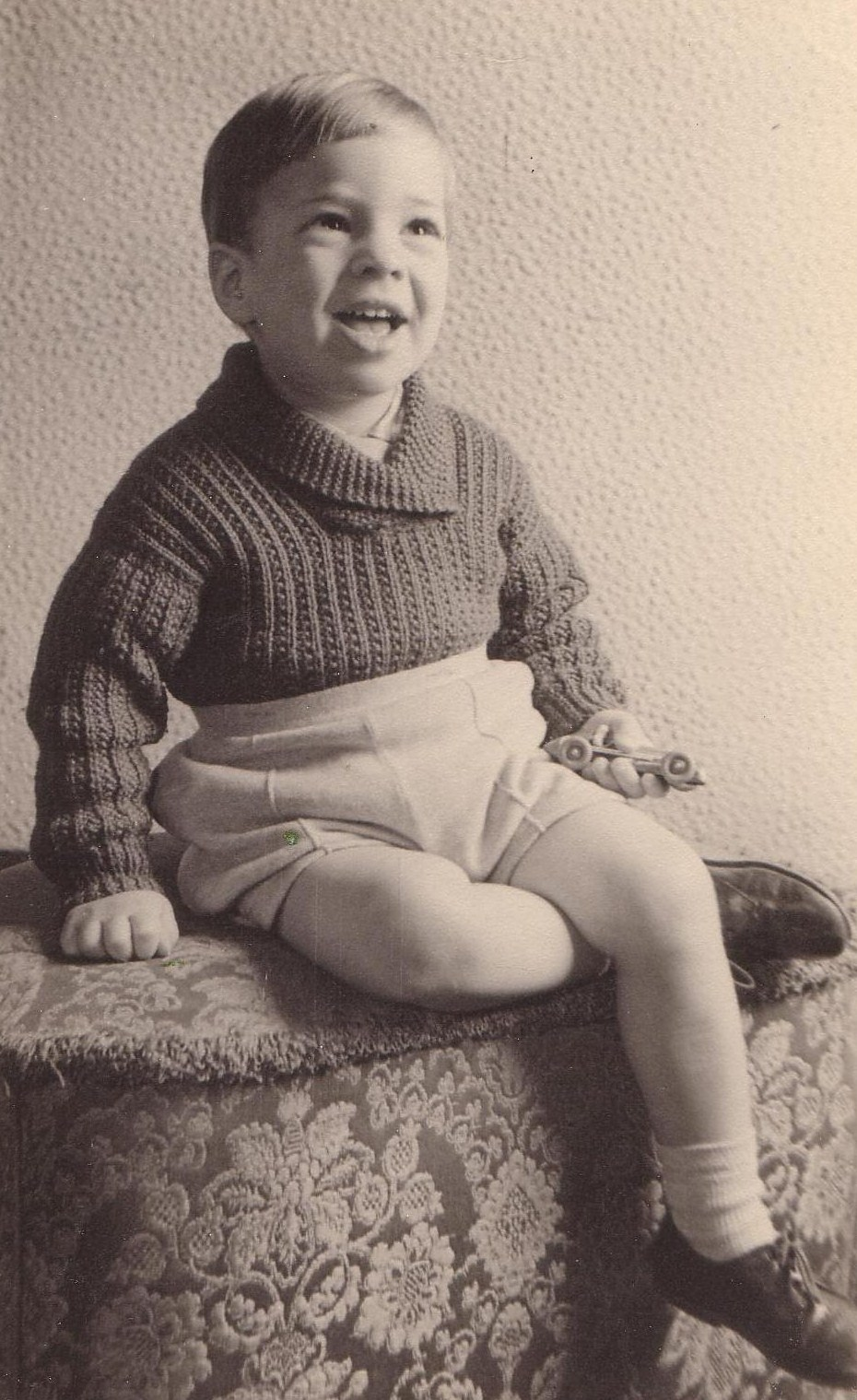
King as a child in St Annes-on-Sea, Lancashire (family archive)

He studied at Lawrence House Prep School, where he excelled in his studies from the start. From a very early age, King taught himself from books he was collecting and studying. He hankered after foreign languages, and in this way studied Russian, Japanese, Hebrew, Esperanto, German, Welsh, Yiddish and several others. He seemed to have an understanding far beyond his years. His other love was classical music, and he asked for piano lessons and became an accomplished pianist at an early age. Every year at prize day at his prep school it was a given that Alan would win the silver trophy for music, among other subjects. At school he studied Greek, Latin and French.

When his parents broke the news that they were emigrating to a new and hopefully better life in America, King refused to go. He demanded to be left behind to attend a well-known senior prep school in a town close to his town, and where he'd expected to gain entrance at 13 years and become a boarder. His parents promised him if he was not satisfied in America he could return to England when he was old enough to fend for himself. So he reluctantly agreed to give it a try.

King, his younger brother Selwyn and his parents stayed in Israel for a few months while visas to settle in America were approved. Alan celebrated his bar mitzva there. Once in America, the family settle in La Jolla, California. Alan was very different to the Californian 13 year olds and did not quite fit in. This change from a small private boys' prep school in England must have been quite bewildering. His brother Selwyn, then 11 years old, soon became one of the crowd and seemed to have no problem enjoying the adventure and change. Alan was still a loner by choice, not finding much in common with other youngsters of his own age.

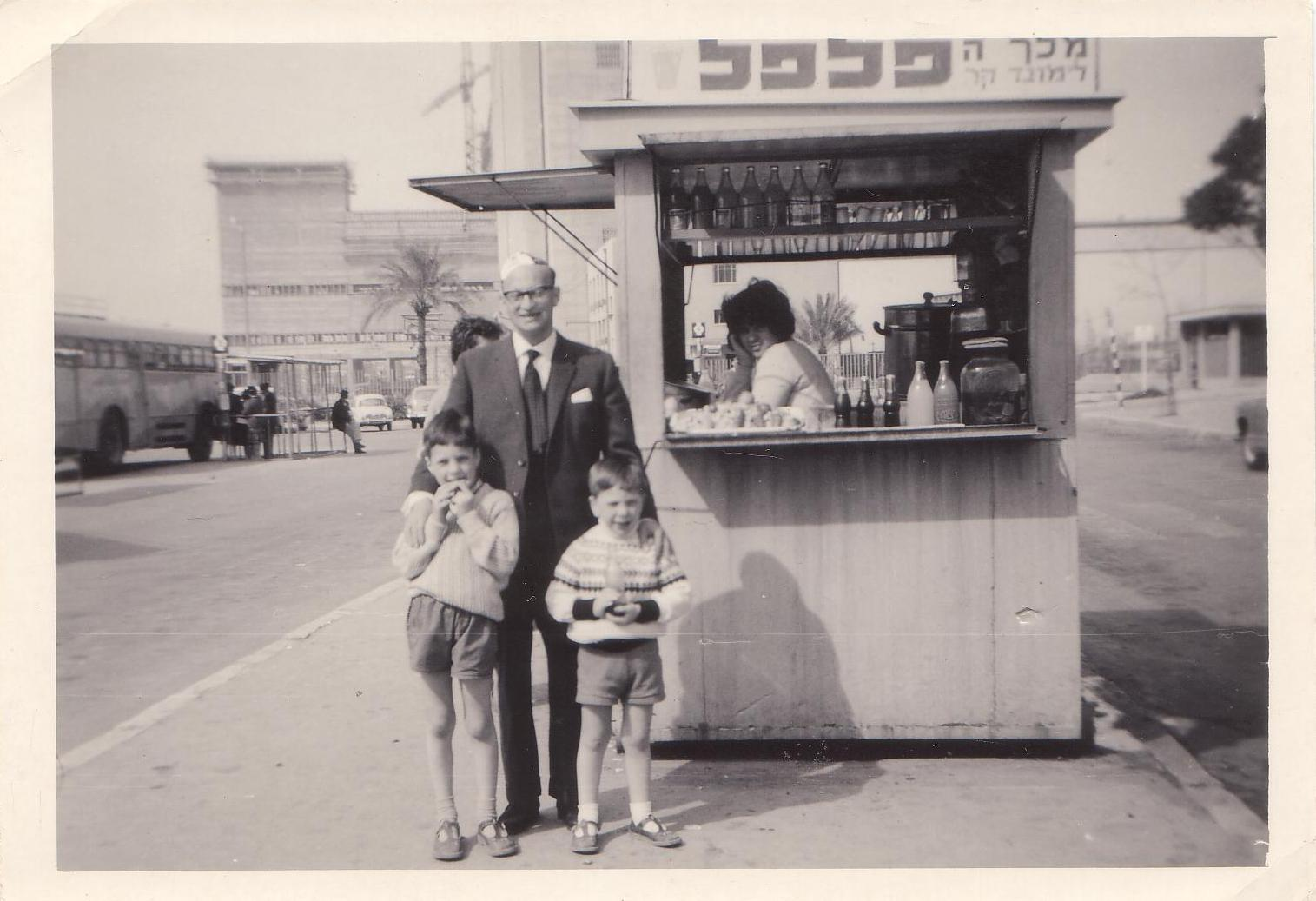
King, his father Mark and younger brother Selwyn in Israel (family archive)

The family joined a synagogue as soon as they settled so that they could continue their Jewish and Hebrew education as well as social activities. Alan joined the youth group where he had no intention of changing to fit in.

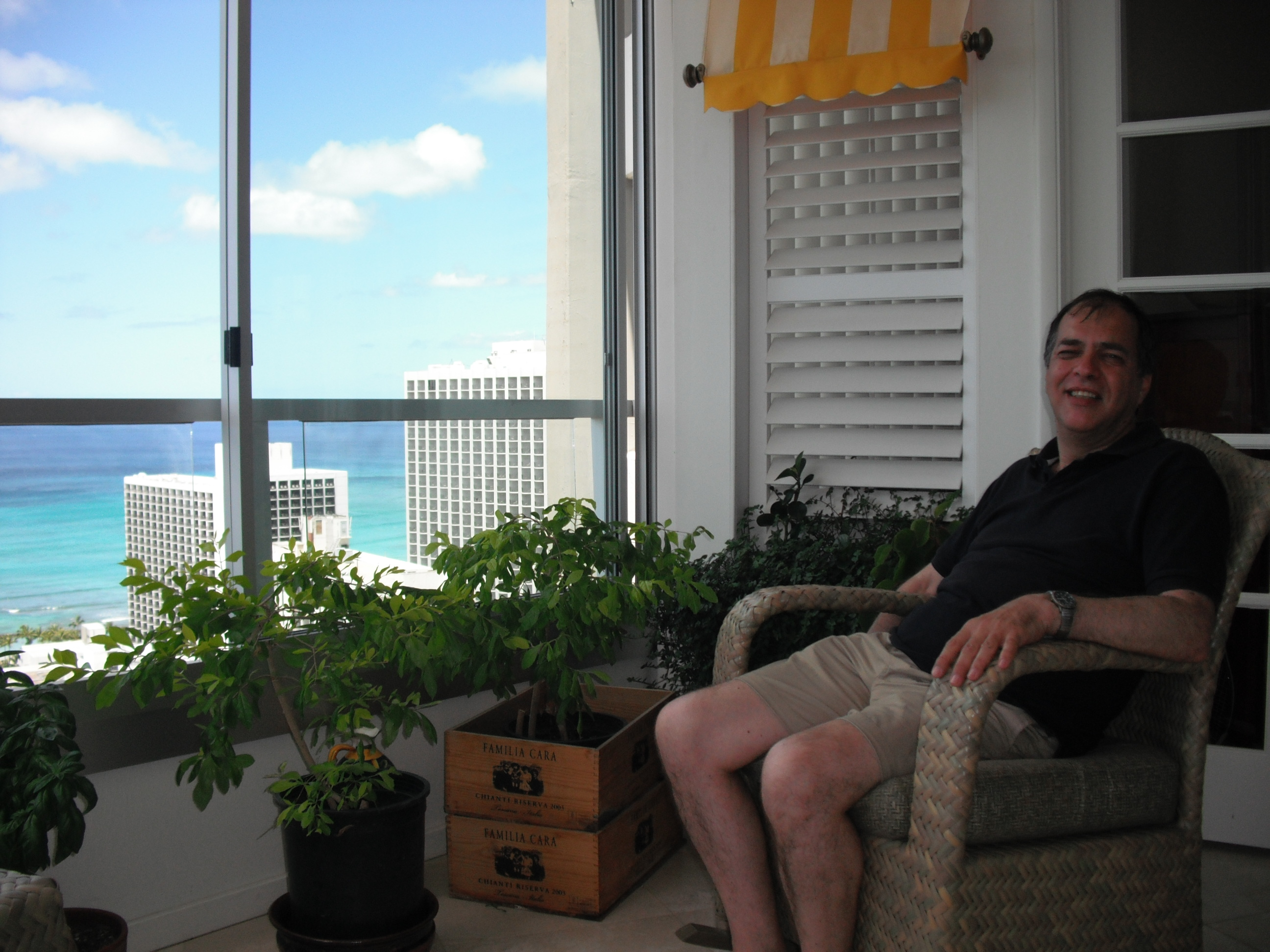
King visiting his family in Honolulu, Hawaii, May 2010. (family archive)

== University ==
In spite of being an honor student at Berkeley he had dropped out, deciding he was returning to England. Once there he found the English universities did not accept his American credits, and he certainly had no intention of returning to high school there. From then on he was fully self-taught. He gained a couple of diplomas in teaching, but did not pursue degrees. In spite of this he had articles published on linguistics and many on the Basque language. Meanwhile, he took any job he could find to earn a meager living.

== Career ==
=== Basque language ===
King first learnt Basque in the late seventies, when he moved to the Basque Country. He worked for a while for UZEI, a Basque institute of language modernization, helping in the production of Basque and multilingual technical dictionaries. During his first years there he wrote a Basque language book in English, The Basque Language: A Practical Introduction, published by the University of Nevada Press.

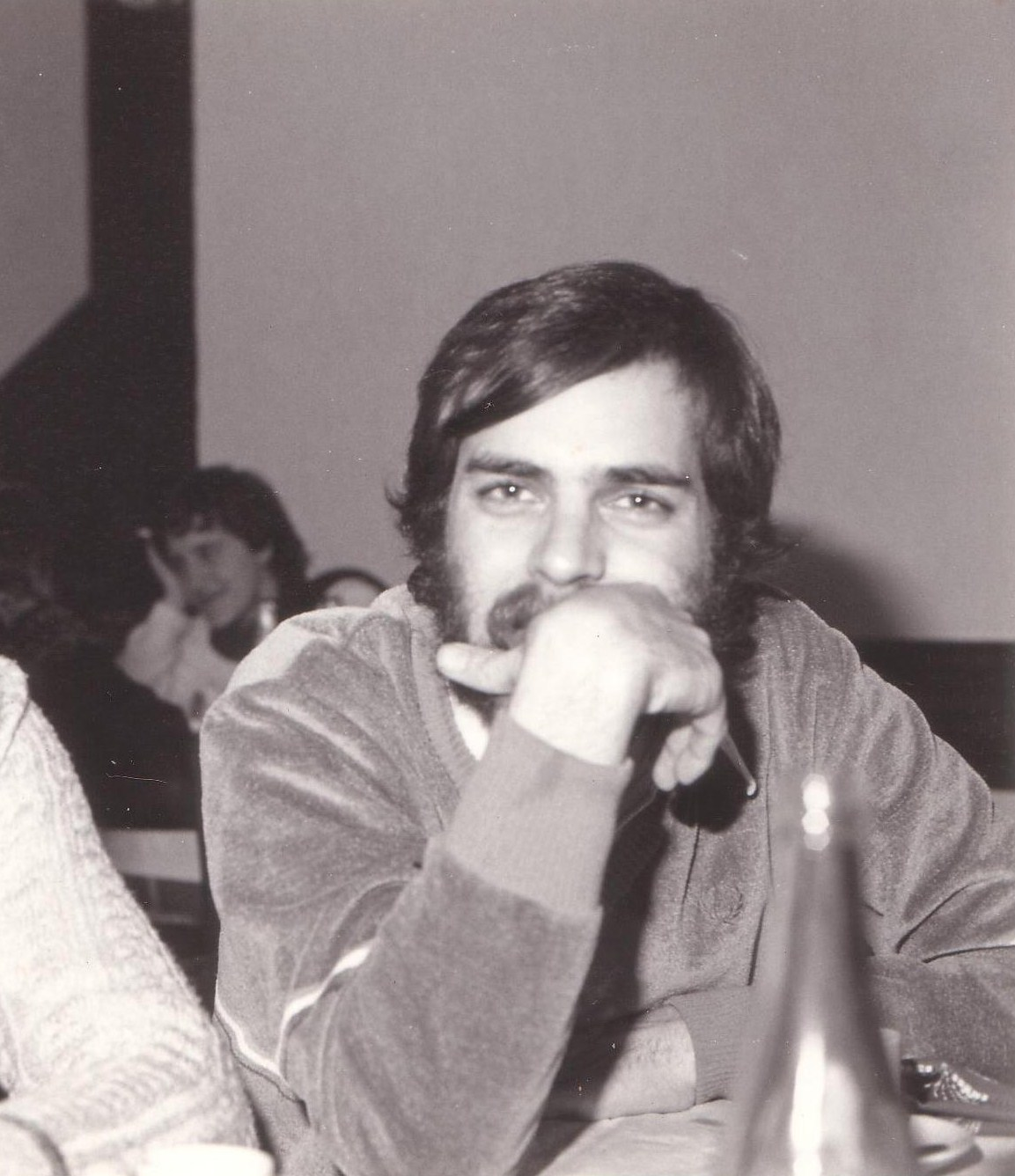
King, the Basque Country early 80's (family archive)

He wrote a study on issues in Basque syntax under a grant from the Government of the Basque Autonomous Community (usually referred to as the Basque Government), titled Euskal Sintaxia: Arazo Nagusiak and in the early eighties he wrote a report for the Basque Government on Basque language standardization. King became a member of the Basque Language Academy's Grammar Commission when it began work on the writing of what has turned out to be a seven-volume Basque grammar which it has taken thirty years to complete (1982–2011):Euskal Gramatika: Lehen Urratsak.

Having first earned a living by teaching English to adults as a foreign language, King also ended up teaching Basque grammar and dialectology (to Basque speakers) for an advanced language diploma course and he also taught the Basque language component of a US study abroad program as well as a course segment on Communicative Analysis within a university diploma course for Basque language teachers.

King authored the Basque Threshold Level objective, part of a Council of Europe modern languages programme: Atalase Maila. This project was jointly run by the Basque Government's Department of Education. King advised a Basque Government Department of Education committee in the development and writing of an official guideline (based on communicative objectives) on minimum Basque language objectives in schools across the Basque Autonomous Community: Hizkuntza Helburuak: A Eredua and participated in a work group of the Basque Institute of Civil Servants, to draw up a system of Basque language profiles for Basque Civil Service job specifications.

King wrote a doctorate thesis at the University of London (Mary-Westfield) in Linguistics titled: Communicative Grammar of the Basque Verb (Selected Aspects). He co-authored, with Begotxu Olaizola, an English-language Basque course book in the "Colloquial" series for Routledge: Colloquial Basque. He also translated Human Sciences secondary school textbooks from Basque into English for a multilingual education programme of the Federation of Ikastolas (a network of non-state Basque-medium schools).

For several years King worked as a professional translator specializing in Basque-English. A large proportion of the work he did is related to issues in the area of Basque language, language recovery, linguistics, sociolinguistics, language teaching, information technology for Basque and so on.

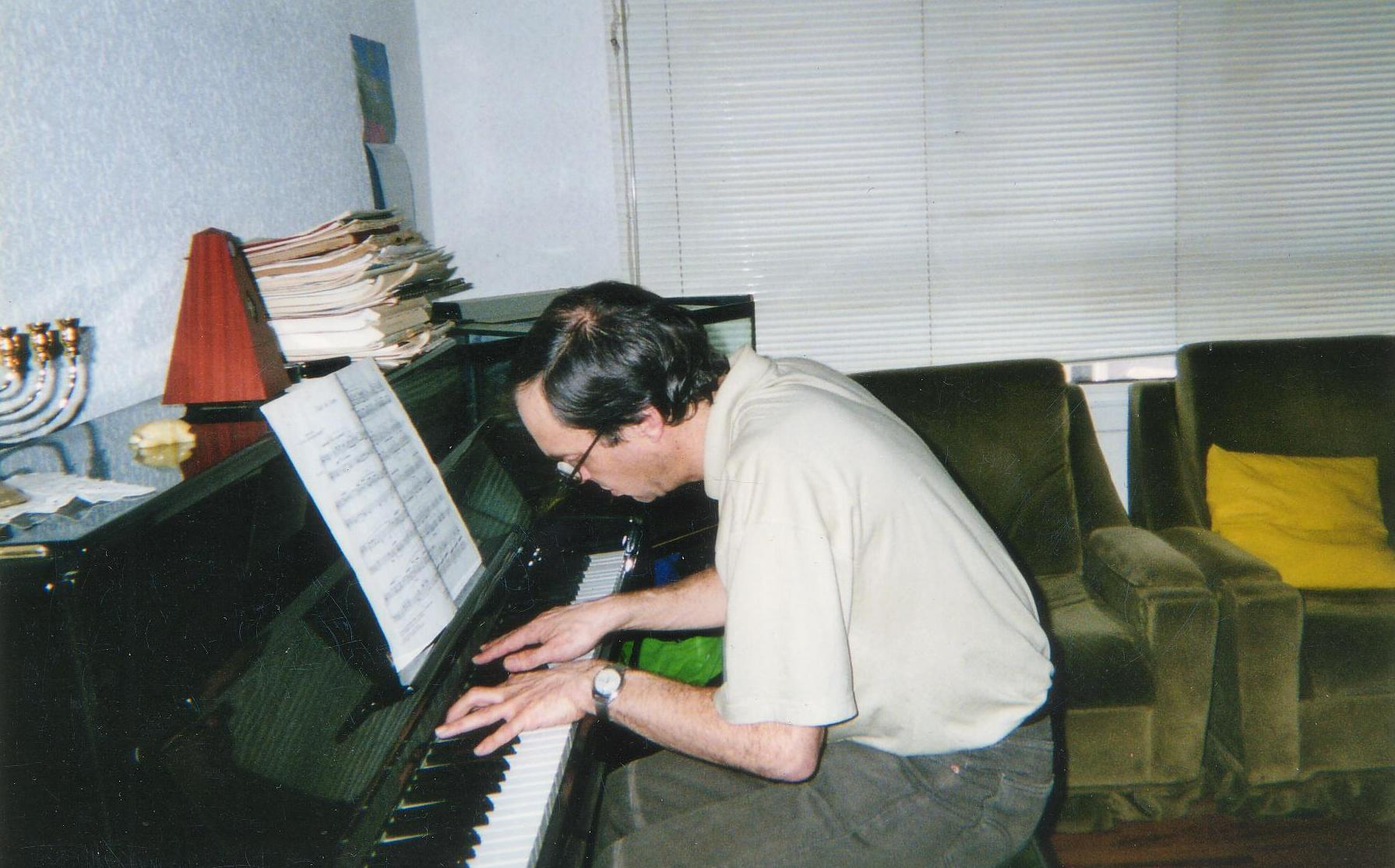
King playing the piano (family archive)

Four of King's poems in Basque language were used by Finnish composer Jaakko Mäntyjärvi as lyrics for choral songs sung by the Kauppakorkeakoulun Ylioppilaskunnan Laulajat, aka the Helsinki Academic Male Choir. The final work by Jaakko Mäntyjärvi titled Hiru gaukantu euskaldun eta tabernako abesti bat (1999) [that is, "Three Basque evening-songs (?) and a drinking song"].

The four songs are titled:

1. Ilargia, iturria ["the moon, the fountain"] 2. Emakume bat ikusi dut ["I saw a woman"] 3. Zure begiak maite ditut ["I love your eyes"] 4. Ardotxo txuria ["a little white wine"]

=== Nawat language ===
King first began to study Nawat in 2002. For two years (2003–2004), during the time when he lived in El Salvador, he designed, ran and coordinated a project for a local university to create a series of textbooks of Nawat as a second language for use in primary schools and to set up a Nawat program in local schools. The name of the textbook series was Ne Nawat Tutaketzalis. Only two of the five projected coursebooks have ever been published because he was not kept on the project long enough to complete the agreed plan, and once he left those who took over failed to continue with production of materials for the remaining levels.

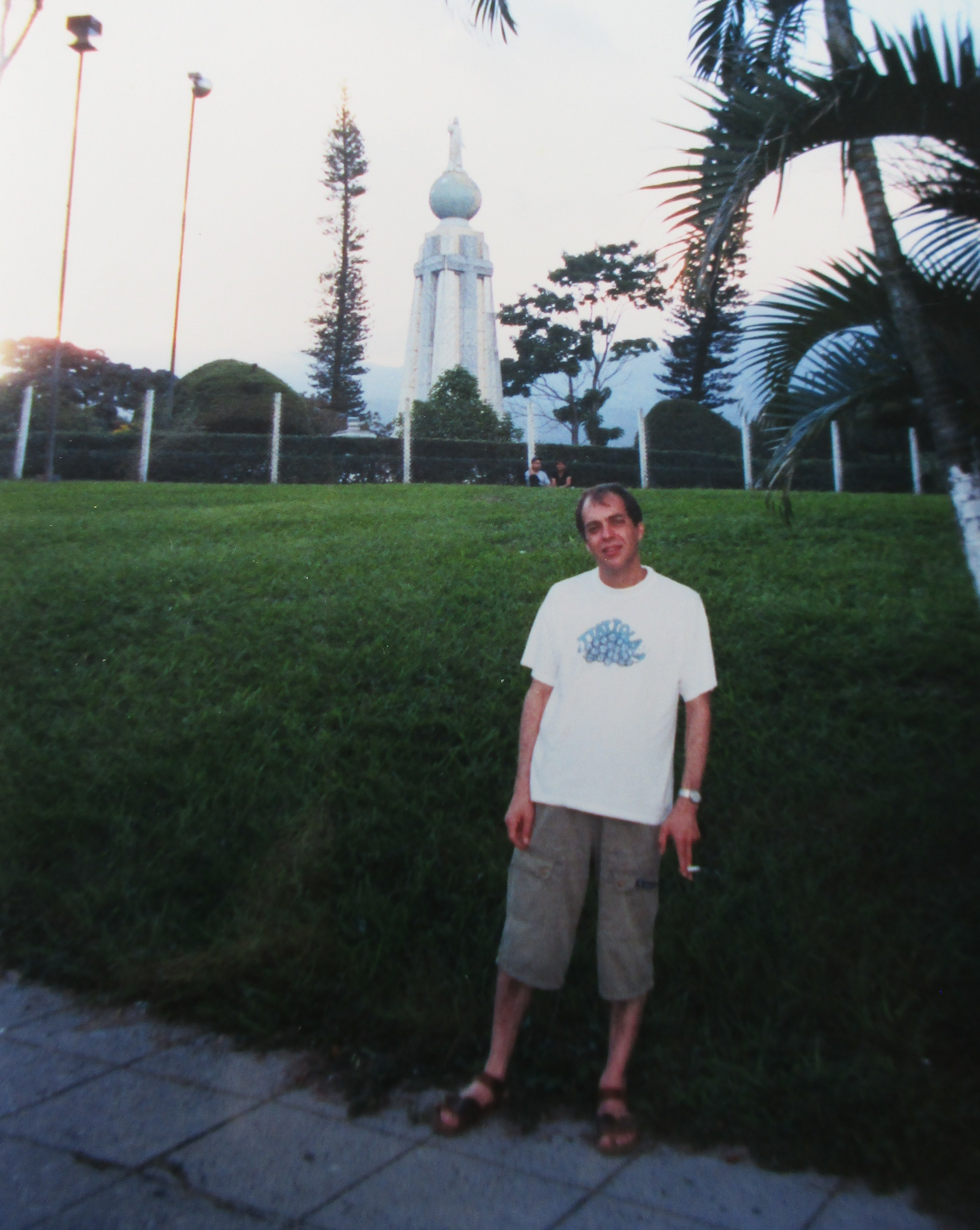
King in San Salvador. August 2002.(family archive)

King organised meetings and workshops with native Nawat speakers and Nawat enthusiasts to discuss the way forward for the Nawat language. With much help from the volunteer staff of TIT (see below), he planned, designed, programmed, organised, prepared, coordinated and taught in the first two yearly intensive training courses for future and practising Nawat language teachers, within the framework of the aforementioned schools programme. These courses lasted for several weeks and gave training in Nawat language and language teaching techniques.

He wrote a monographic study and analysis of a translation by native speakers of the Universal Declaration of Human Rights which served as a starting point for Nawat linguistic studies and taught a short introductory course on the Nawat language at the university for which I worked. As part of the aforementioned project, he created and ran an office of the Nawat language in Izalco, the historical and symbolic centre of the Pipil nation, with a staff of three, called Tajkwiluyan Ipal Ne Taketzalis (TIT). This was later disbanded by the university after I left the project.

King played a key role in the creation of a grassroots pro-Nawat association called Iniciativa para la Recuperación del Idioma Náhuat (IRIN) – Te Miki Tay Tupal. The immediate context for this was the refusal of the Salvadorean university for which he worked to support with resources the projects it wished to claim as its own, so that if no alternative way of supporting them had been found these projects would have proved impossible. But the general brief adopted by IRIN was to support all activities in favour of the Nawat language by any means at its disposal. IRIN members included some native Nawat speakers, some non-Nawat-speaking people from the traditional Pipil area, some people from elsewhere in El Salvador and some non-Salvadoreans. It is based in Izalco, where most of IRIN's meetings are held and from where the association is run. Besides keeping the university school project going in its first critical years (a role which has not been acknowledged), IRIN has been responsible for other work of fundamental importance for the language recovery movement including the printing and distribution of Nawat books and materials, and a groundbreaking language documentation project which resulted in obtaining many hours of new audio and video recordings of Nawat-language interviews between native speakers.

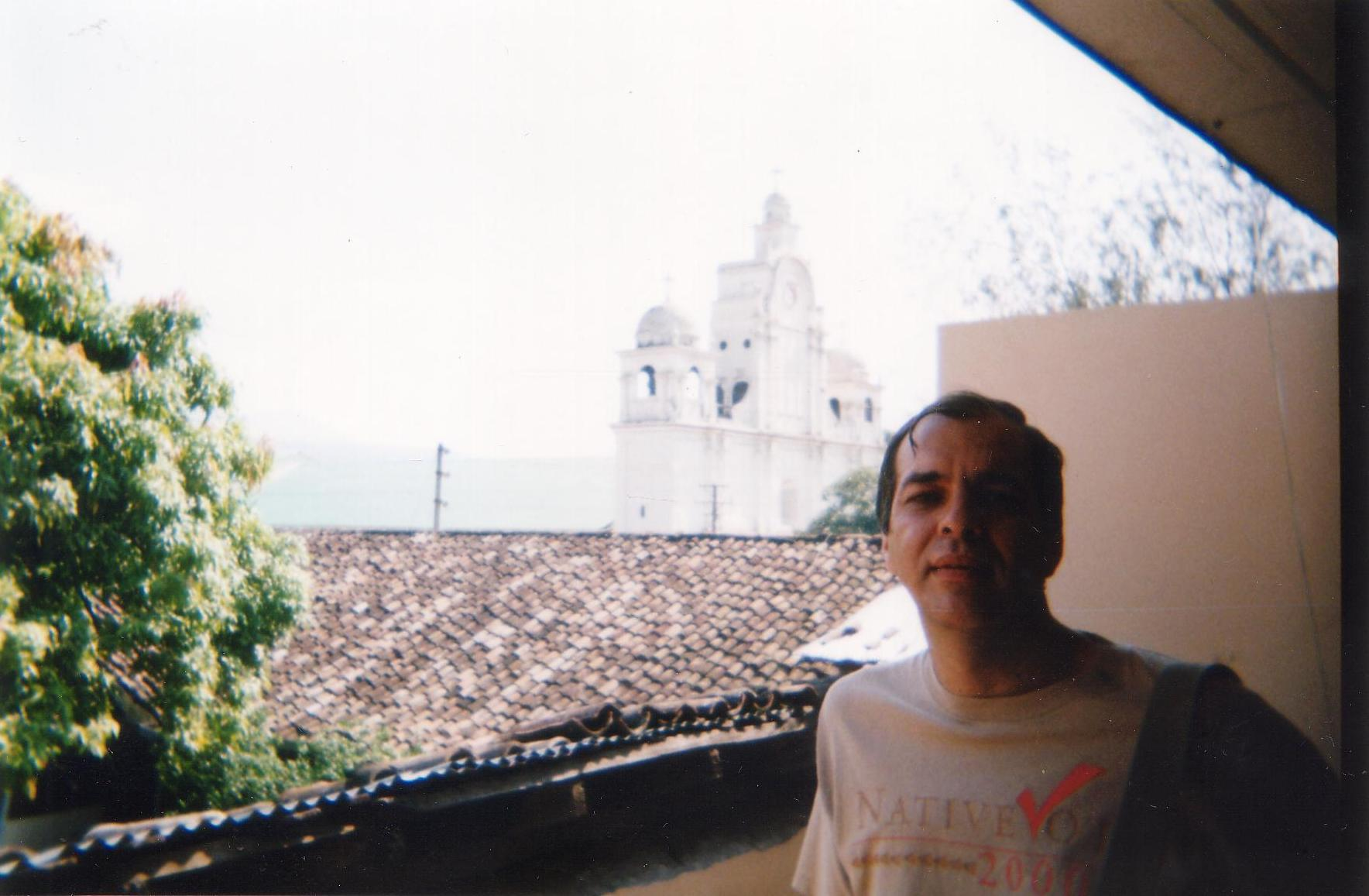
King at Casa de la Cultura. Izalco, Sonsonate. El Salvador 2004. (family archive)

King created the Seminario Lingüístico Náhuat which early on addressed important subjects such as the proposal of a standard spelling, internal dialect variation, and the lexicon. Over the years he has developed a corpus of Nawat texts which form an important basis for Nawat language study, research and development and developed a prototype of a database to bring together different Nawat lexical sources, called NawatLex. Later on, he created a new integrated database system of a different kind (NawaCoLex) which brings together in a single framework the Nawat corpus and Nawat lexical sources.

He also wrote a series of short books containing easy lessons in Nawat for adults, distributed by IRIN, titled Shimumachti Nawat. Later he developed this material into an online Nawat course called Timumachtikan Nawat, which has been followed by numerous people. More recently this material was again revised and reorganised as a complete book constituting a comprehensive elementary language course titled Timumachtikan!. King also wrote a variety of other Nawat language materials which were printed and distributed by IRIN, including a Nawat basic vocabulary and an elementary grammar. He edited and prepared a trilingual publication by IRIN, a short book of Nawat writings by the native speaker Genaro Ramírez Vásquez:Naja Ni Genaro.

King worked with the team of TIT to create, print and distribute two issues of a local newsletter, partly in Nawat, called Tinemit. He translated the Biblical book of Genesis from Hebrew to Nawat (printed and distributed by IRIN).And edited a version in standard spelling of the Nawat content of the largest item in the Nawat corpus, the book published by the German anthropologist Leonhard Schultze Jena, as a separate Nawat-language book titled Tajtaketza Pal Ijtzalku.

King advised IRIN from a distance (since he was no longer in El Salvador) on its great language documentation project, mentioned above. Subsequently, he supervised and revised the transcription of the recorded interviews. Still later, he supervised the editing and addition of subtitles to some of the interviews, in versions with Nawat and Spanish subtitles respectively, which also entailed translating the transcriptions of those interviews and he carried out a programme to develop these subtitled versions into a supplementary audiovisual Nawat language course based on these authentic materials, called Mukaki.

King played a major part in the development in recent years of a busy, dynamic on-line community of people interested in learning Nawat and forming or supporting a Nawat language recovery movement, located on a cluster of groups and pages on Facebook. See the FB group "Salvemos el Idioma Náhuat" for more information. He engaged in a project to translate the entire Bible into Nawat for which he completed the translation of the New Testament which is now on line at Ne Bibliaj Tik Nawat and also developed a Nawat New Testament lexicon for NBTN, which has also sponsored the writing of a new Nawat grammar.

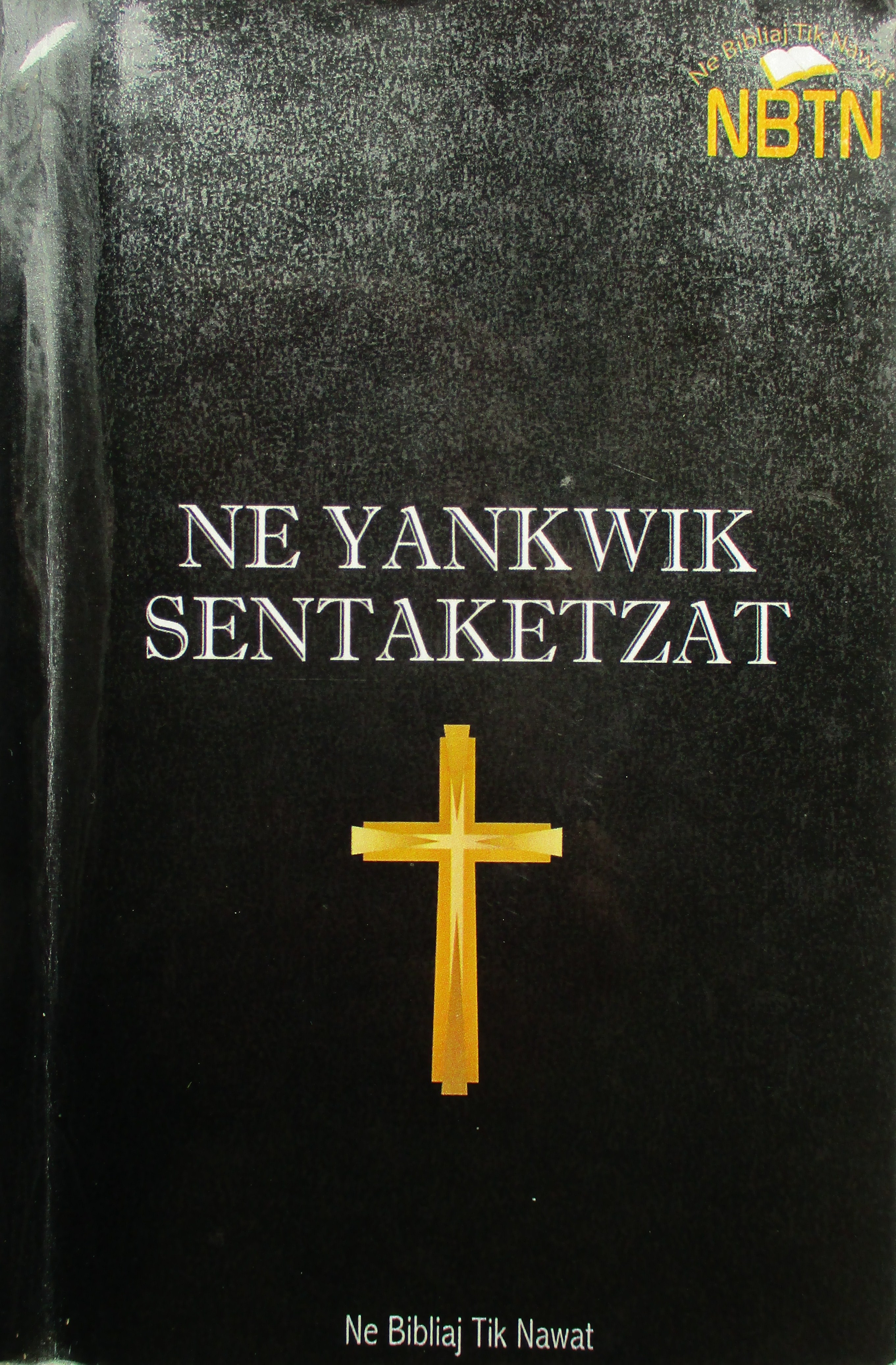
Cover of The Bible in Nawat. Translated by Alan R. King, 2011. Reviewed in 2013.

=== Translator ===
King worked as an occasional translator for much of his life and as a full-time freelance translator from 2005. Translations constituted his main source of income, while he continued to dedicate most of his remaining time to a range of language-related projects. On some occasions he agreed to provide some interpreting to meet a client's needs but this was not his usual work.

Over the years King translated, into or out of, quite a number of languages, including Basque, Catalan, English, French, Galician, New Testament Greek, Biblical Hebrew, Nawat, Spanish and Welsh. During his last years the usual language pairs he mostly worked with were Basque-English and Galician-English. Most of his translations are in areas related to language such as linguistics, language teaching, language recovery, sociolinguistics, dialectology, and so on. At times he did venture further afield into, for example, education, history, geography, information technology, literature, politics and social sciences.

King translated texts of various types including academic articles, teaching materials, journalism, reports, talks and lectures, stories, scripts, subtitles, poems, songs and Biblical texts. He provided translations to the Basque Government, universities, schools, public entities and organisations, newspapers, private businesses, academics, dissertation authors, private individuals and translation agencies.

== Notable works ==
=== Basque ===
- King, Alan R. (1982). A Basque Course: A Complete Initiation to the Study of the Basque Language. Unpublished typescript.
- King, Alan R. (1994). The Basque Language: A Practical Introduction. Reno: University of Nevada Press.
- King, Alan R., and Begotxu Olaizola Elordi (1996). Colloquial Basque. London: Routledge.

=== Nawat ===
- King, Alan R. (2011). Timumachtikan!: Curso de lengua náhuat para principiantes adultos. Izalco, El Salvador: Iniciativa para la Recuperación del Idioma Náhuat.

=== Language revitalization ===
- King, Alan R. (2018). 'Language Recovery Paradigms'. In Kenneth L. Rehg and Lyle Campbell (eds.), The Oxford Handbook of Endangered Languages, pp. 531–552. New York: Oxford University Press.

Most of King's work on Nawat and Lenca is available to download for free.
