= Liberty Party =

Liberty Party may refer to:

- Liberty Party (United States)
  - Liberty Party (United States, 1840)
  - Liberty Party (United States, 1932)
  - Christian Liberty Party
- Liberty (Poland)
- Liberty Party (Liberia)
- Liberty Party (Turkey) a historical party in Turkey
- Liberty Korea Party

== See also ==
- Liberal Party
- Libertarian Party (disambiguation)
- Freedom Party (disambiguation)
