= LPP (gene) =

Protein-coding gene in humans

Identifiers
- Aliases: LPP, LIM domain containing preferred translocation partner in lipoma
- External IDs: OMIM: 600700; MGI: 2441849; GeneCards: LPP

Gene location (Human)
Chr.	Chromosome 3 (human)
Band	3q27.3-q28	Start	188,153,284 bp
Band	3q27.3-q28	End	188,890,671 bp

Gene location (Mouse)
Chr.	Chromosome 16 (mouse)
Band	16|16 B1	Start	24,393,507 bp
Band	16|16 B1	End	24,992,578 bp
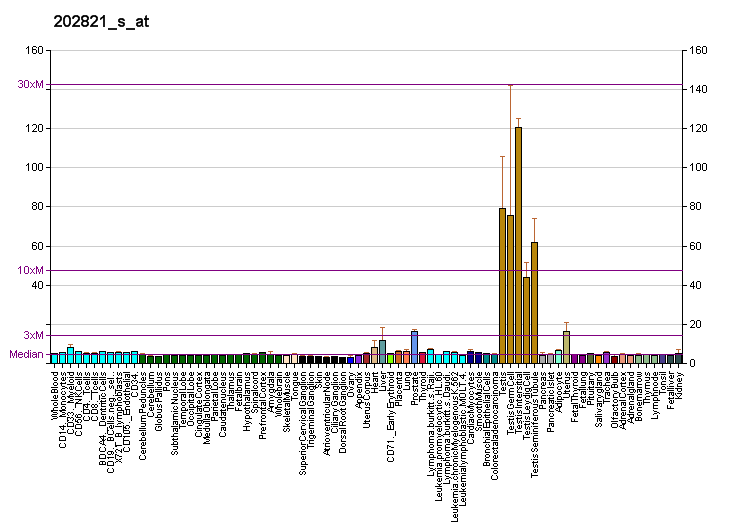
RNA expression pattern
Bgee	Human / Mouse (ortholog); Top expressed in: saphenous vein; urethra; vena cava; nipple; pylorus; tail of epididymis; cardia; seminal vesicula; epithelium of colon; superficial temporal artery / Top expressed in: ascending aorta; aortic valve; Paneth cell; umbilical cord; tunica media of zone of aorta; endothelial cell of lymphatic vessel; conjunctival fornix; urinary bladder; cervix; Ileal epithelium; More reference expression data
BioGPS	More reference expression data
Gene ontology
Molecular function	protein binding; metal ion binding
Cellular component	cell junction; plasma membrane; membrane; nucleus; focal adhesion; cytoplasm; cytosol; stress fiber
Biological process	cell adhesion; biological process; cell-cell adhesion
Sources:Amigo / QuickGO
Orthologs
Databases	NCBI: entry; OMA: entry
Species	Human	Mouse
Entrez	4026	210126
Ensembl	ENSG00000145012	ENSMUSG00000033306
UniProt	Q93052	Q8BFW7
RefSeq (mRNA)	NM_001167671; NM_001167672; NM_005578; NM_001375455; NM_001375456 NM_001375457; NM_001375458; NM_001375459; NM_001375460; NM_001375461; NM_001375462; NM_001375463; NM_001375464; NM_001375465	NM_001145952; NM_001145954; NM_178665
RefSeq (protein)	NP_001161143; NP_001161144; NP_005569; NP_001362384; NP_001362385 NP_001362386; NP_001362387; NP_001362388; NP_001362389; NP_001362390; NP_001362391; NP_001362392; NP_001362393; NP_001362394	NP_001139424; NP_001139426; NP_848780
Location (UCSC)	Chr 3: 188.15 – 188.89 Mb	Chr 16: 24.39 – 24.99 Mb
PubMed search
- Wikidata
View/Edit Human	View/Edit Mouse

Lipoma-preferred partner is a protein that in humans is encoded by the LPP gene.

== Function ==
Lipoma-preferred partner is a subfamily of LIM domain proteins that are characterized by an N-terminal proline rich region and three C-terminal LIM domains. The encoded protein localizes to the cell periphery in focal adhesions and may be involved in cell-cell adhesion and cell motility. This protein also shuttles through the nucleus and may function as a transcriptional co-activator. This gene is located at the junction of certain disease related chromosomal translocations which result in the expression of fusion proteins that may promote tumor growth.
