= Cuisnahuat =

- Municipality
- Location in El Salvador
- Coordinates: 13°38′N 89°36′W
- Country: El Salvador
- Department: Sonsonate

Government
  - Mayor: Gustavo Ernesto Sierra Pérez

Area
  - Municipality: 28.20 sq mi (73.03 km^{2})
- Elevation: 1,410 ft (430 m)

Population
  - Municipality: 12,676

Cuisnahuat (Nawat: Kwisnāwat) is a city and municipality in the Sonsonate department of El Salvador.
