= Limited Liability Partnership Act, 2008 =

Act of the Parliament of India

Limited Liability Partnership Act, 2009

Parliament of India
- Long title: An Act to make provision for the formation and regulation of limited liability partnerships and for matters connected therewith or incidental thereto.
- Citation: No. 6 of 2009
- Enacted by: Parliament of India
- Enacted: 12 December 2008
- Assented to: 7 January 2009
- Commenced: 31 March 2009
- Status: In force

The Limited Liability Partnership Act, 2008 was enacted by the Parliament of India to introduce and legally sanction the concept of limited liability partnership (LLP) in India. Unlike the general partnerships in India, LLP is a body corporate and legal entity separate from its partners, have Perpetual succession and any change in the partners of an LLP shall not affect the existence, rights or liabilities of the LLP.

Section 4. Non-applicability of the Indian Partnership Act, 1932.—Save as otherwise provided, the provisions of the Indian Partnership Act, 1932 (9 of 1932) shall not apply to a limited liability partnership.

== Overview ==
LLP is a corporate business vehicle that enables professional expertise and entrepreneurial initiative to combine and operate in flexible, innovative and efficient manner, as a hybrid of companies & partnerships providing benefits of limited liability while allowing its members the flexibility for organizing their internal structure as a partnership. LLP is a legal entity partnership act.

- Separate Legal Entity- Continue its existence irrespective of changes in partners,
- LLP itself can enter into contracts and hold properties,
- Partners' Liability limited to the agreed contribution,
- Professional & Non-professional (Businessmen), both can set up LLP.

== Definitions ==
Foreign Limited Liability Partnership: An LLP formed, incorporated or registered outside India which establishes a place of business within India. A LLP is a new form of business entity with limited liability. It is hybrid of companies and partnership.

Partner: Partner means any person who becomes a partner in the LLP in accordance with the LLP agreement.

Financial Year: The period from the 1st day of April of a year to the 31st day of March of the following year. In the case of an LLP incorporated after the 30th day of September of a year, the financial year may end on the 31st day of March of the next following year.

== Salient features ==
=== LLP agreement ===
Any written agreement between the partners of the LLP or between the LLP and its partners which determines the mutual rights and duties of the partners and their rights and duties in relation to that LLP. It is not necessary to enter into an LLP agreement as per LLP Act, 2008. In the absence of LLP agreement, the mutual rights of corporates, at least two individuals who are partners of such limited liability partnership or nominees of such bodies corporate shall act as designated partners.

=== Accounts and audit ===
LLP is required to maintain books of accounts for each year on cash basis or on accrual basis. Accounts shall be audited by Auditors appointed by the LLP. Audit of accounts is compulsory if turnover exceeds Rs. 40 lakhs in any financial year or contribution by partners exceed Rs. 25 lakhs.

The Statement of Accounts and Solvency for the year ended 31 March is required to be filed with the Registrar before 30 October in each year.

=== Penalty ===
Any person guilty of an offence under this Act for which no punishment is expressly provided shall be liable to a fine which may extend to five lakh rupees but which shall not be less than five thousand rupees and which may extend to fifty thousand rupees for every day after the first day after which the default continues.

== Taxation of a Limited Liability Partnership ==
The entire taxation of LLPs is similar to the existing taxation pattern applicable to Partnerships registered and formed under The Indian Partnership Act, 1932. The income of an LLP is taxed at the flat rate of 30% (plus surcharge and cess, as applicable) on the total income. However, the partners of an LLP are not taxed on the income that is earned by the LLP. Instead, the income is taxed in the hands of the partners only when it is distributed as profits or remuneration. Another advantage of LLPs is that they are exempt from dividend distribution tax, which is a tax that is levied on companies when they distribute dividends to their shareholders.

== Annual compliance ==
LLP has to complete the following compliance each year:

1. Form 11- Annual Return of LLP (Filed pursuant to Rules 25(1) of the LLP Rules, 2009 (It usually contains the details of partners at the year end, details of changes in partnership firm during the year like admission of new partners, retirement and death of partner etc.) It specifically asks if the Capital committed by each partner has been received by the LLP.
2. Form 8 - Statement of Account and Solvency (Filed pursuant to Rule 24 of the LLP Rules 2009 (It contains financial figures (Balance Sheet and Profit and Loss account), statement that the LLP is solvent. Attachments include Dues to MSME disclosures and Audit Report if the turnover of LLP Crosses Rs. 4 million for the financial year.
3. DIR 3 KYC - This is technically a requirement under the Companies Act but since the 'Designated partners Identification Number' (DPIN) has been merged with Director Identification Number (DIN), hence the annual requirement of DIR KYC is not applicable even to designated partners of LLP.

Tax compliances are not listed here.

- Earlier both Form 8 and Form 11 were pdf based forms where the forms were filled offline and uploaded after being digitally signed. However with the introduction of MCA -V3 in Feb 2022, all forms have been converted to web based forms.
- Form 8 has to be filed within 30 days of passage of 6 months of closure of the financial year. Due date is usually 30 October.
- Form 11 has to be filed within 60 days of closure of the financial year. Due date is usually 30 May.
- Both Form 8 and Form 11 are processed under STP mode i.e. Straight Processing mode. They are approved automatically and are not manually processed.
- Late fees for LLPs can go upto 25 times the normal fees for 'Small LLPs' and 50 times for 'Other than Small LLPs'.
