= PPL India =

Indian collective rights management organization (CMO)

Phonographic Performance Limited India, commonly known as PPL India, is an Indian collective rights management organization (CMO), founded in 1941. The company controls the Public Performance rights of 317 music labels, with more than 1.5 million foreign and 0.8 million Indian songs in their repertoire. Additionally, PPL also holds the Radio Broadcast licensing rights of 268 record labels. The tracks represented by the organization encompass numerous languages including English, Hindi, Marathi, Punjabi, Tamil, Telugu, and Bengali.

== Function ==
Phonographic Performance Limited India licenses its copyrighted sound recordings to consumers to publicly perform the songs and for radio broadcast. It is empowered to collect fees on behalf of its member music labels and distribute the proceeds accordingly.

== Membership ==
The companies represented by PPL in India account for a sizable proportion of the total music market share internationally and domestically. In 2018, PPL India acquired the music rights of South Indian Music Companies Association (SIMCA) thereby gaining control of up to 60% of the region's total musical output. The organization represents some of the world's and India's largest record labels, including T-Series, Sony Music, Saregama, Universal Music, Warner Music India, Times Music and many more record labels.

PPL India is also affiliated with the International Federation of Phonographic Industries (IFPI)

== Organizational structure ==
PPL India is managed by a board of directors who serve at the pleasure of the company's stakeholders. The day-to-day operations of PPL are overseen by its Managing Director and CEO Mr. Rajat Kakar who was appointed to serve in January 2018. The company currently has 170 employees, operates 17 offices across India, and is headquartered in Andheri, Mumbai.

== Public performance in India ==
PPL enforces the intellectual property rights of its members by ensuring that businesses comply with the law by paying for the music they consume.

== Radio broadcasting rights ==
PPL India also collects license fees on behalf of its members for music played by private, community, and public radio stations across the country. It currently holds the Radio Broadcasting rights of 268 record labels.
