= Santo Domingo de Guzmán, El Salvador =

Santo Domingo de Guzmán Witzapan Huitzapan
- Municipality
- Location within El Salvador
- Coordinates: 13°42′58″N 89°47′52″W
- Country: El Salvador
- Department: Sonsonate
- Municipality: Sonsonate Centro

Santo Domingo de Guzmán (Pipil: Witzapan) is a district in the Sonsonate department of El Salvador.

Small municipality at the border between Ahuachapán and Sonsonate Departments.
