= Nawat language =

Nahuan language of El Salvador and Nicaragua

Nawat
- Pipil
- Nāwat, Nāwataketsalis, Náhuat
- Native to: El Salvador, Nicaragua, Chiapas, Honduras, Guatemala, Costa Rica
- Region: Sonsonate, Ahuachapán, La Libertad, San Salvador, Escuintla, Rivas, Chinandega, Jinotega, Nueva Segovia, Masaya, Matagalpa, Guanacaste, Olancho
- Ethnicity: 29,445 Pipils (2024 census), 20,000+ Nicaraos (2022)
- Native speakers: 1,135 (2024); L2: 3,000 learners (2012)
- Language family: Uto-Aztecan: Southern Uto-Aztecan; Aztecan (Nahuan); General Aztec; Eastern; Nawat

Official status
- Recognised minority language in: El Salvador

Language codes
- ISO 639-3: ppl
- Glottolog: pipi1250
- ELP: Pipil

Nawat, also known as Náhuat and academically referred to as Pipil, is a Nahuan language native to Central America. It is the southernmost extant member of the Uto-Aztecan family. Before Spanish colonization it was spoken in several parts of present-day Central America, most notably El Salvador and Nicaragua, but now is mostly confined to western El Salvador. Nahuat was still spoken in several towns in Pacific Guatemala until at least the late 1700s. It has been on the verge of extinction in El Salvador, and has already gone extinct elsewhere in Central America. In 2012, a large number of Nawat speakers were identified and the language is now undergoing a revitalization process.

In El Salvador, Nawat was the language of several groups: Nonualcos, Cuscatlecos, Izalcos and is known to be the Nahua variety of migrating Toltec. The name Pipil for this language is mostly used by the international scholarly community to differentiate it more clearly from Nahuatl. In Nicaragua it was spoken by the Nicarao people who split from the Náhuat around 1200 when they migrated south. Nawat became the lingua franca there during the 16th century. A hybrid form of Nahuat-Spanish was spoken by many Nicaraguans up until the 19th century. The Nawat language was also spoken in Chiapas by Toltec settlers who inhabited the region for hundreds of years before migrating further into Central America.

== Classification ==
Most authors refer to this language by the names Nawat, Nahuat, Pipil, or Nicarao. However, Nawat (along with the synonymous Eastern Nahuatl) has also been used to refer to Nahuatl language varieties in southern Veracruz, Tabasco, and Chiapas, states in the south of Mexico, that like Nawat have reduced the earlier /t͡ɬ/ consonant (a lateral affricate) to a /t/. Those Mexican lects share more similarities with Nawat than do the other Nahuatl varieties.

Nawat specialists (Campbell, Fidias Jiménez, Geoffroy Rivas, King, Lemus, and Schultze, inter alia) generally treat Pipil/Nawat as a separate language, at least in practice. Lastra de Suárez (1986) and Canger (1988) classify Pipil among "Eastern Periphery" dialects of Nahuatl.

Map of El Salvador's Indigenous Peoples at the time of the Spanish conquest: 1. Náhuat people, 2. Lenca, 3. Kakawira o Cacaopera, 4. Xinca, 5. Maya Ch'orti' people, 6. Maya Poqomam people, 7. Mangue o Chorotega.

(Campbell 1985)

- Uto-Aztecan
  - Southern Uto-Aztecan
    - Nahuan (Aztecan, Nahuatlan)
      - Pochutec (extinct)
      - General Aztec
        - Core Nahua
        - Nawat

Uto-Aztecan is uncontroversially divided into eight branches, including Nahuan. Research continues into verifying higher level groupings. However, the grouping adopted by Campbell of the four southernmost branches is not yet universally accepted.

== Geographic distribution ==
Localities where Nawat was reported by Lyle Campbell as spoken in the 1970s include the following:

- Ataco
- Chiltiupan
- Comasagua
- Cuisnahuat
- Izalco
- Jicalapa
- Juayua
- Nahulingo
- Nahuizalco
- Santa Catarina Masahuat
- Santa Isabel Ishuatán
- Santo Domingo de Guzmán
- Tacuba
- Teotepeque

Gordon (2009) lists Dolores as a Pipil-speaking area.

Nahuat was also formerly spoken in Guatemala, Honduras, Nicaragua and Costa Rica, though it is now extinct in all of these countries.

Kaufman (1970:66) lists Escuintla and Comapa as former Nawat-speaking areas of Guatemala, and San Agustín Acasaguastlán as a former "Mejicano"-speaking town. The genetic position of San Agustín Acasaguastlán Mejicano is still uncertain (see Alagüilac language), but Nawat may have only been introduced in the post-contact period. Fowler (1989) further lists Asunción Mita, Santa María Ixhuatán, Jumaytepeque, and Jalpatagua as Pipil towns in the sixteenth century.

In Honduras, ethnic Nahua populations are present in small numbers in the Olancho Department, in the municipalities of Catacamas, Gualaco, Guata, Jano and Esquipulas del Norte. However, unlike the Nahuas of El Salvador, Nicaragua, and Costa Rica who fled central and southern Mexico during the post-classical era due to famine, societal collapse, civil wars, and invasions from enemy forces, the Nahuas of Olancho are descended from pochtecas who were sent to Central America by Ahuizotl of Tenochtitlan at the start of the modern era in 1501 CE to establish trade relations with the Indigenous peoples of Central America. Therefore, the Nahuas of Olancho most likely spoke central-Mexican Nahuatl instead of Nawat.

There were some Nahua communities in other parts of Honduras in the 16th century, but they have since disappeared. Fowler (1989) wrote of possible Nahua presences in the prehispanic and early colonial periods at Nito, Naco, Chapagua and Papayeca (in the valley of the Aguán River near Trujillo), Olancho Department, Comayagua, and Nacaome, though alongside other ethnic groups such as the Lenca. Toponyms and colonial-era records also attest to a large Nahua presence in the Ocotepeque Department.

In Nicaragua, the International Work Group for Indigenous Affairs counted 20,000 Nahuas/Nicaraos in 2022. The International Labour Organization also counted 20,000 Nicaraos. However, DNA analysis has proven that the Nahua admixture in the modern Nicaraguan gene pool is high, especially among western Nicaraguans, both whites and Mestizos alike, making the number of Nahua descendants much higher. Fully Indigenous Nahuas can be found all over the western half of Nicaragua. Out of all the Central American dialects of Nawat, the dialect spoken by the Nicarao was found to be the most similar to central-Mexican Nahuatl. The Nawat language went extinct in Nicaragua in the late 1800s, and was last spoken on Ometepe Island and in the departments of Rivas and Masaya.

In Costa Rica, a small population of Nahuas inhabit Bagaces and other parts of Guanacaste province. They are Nicaraos who migrated and displaced the Huetares who originally inhabited Bagaces. They spoke the Nawat language before it went extinct in Costa Rica.

An extinct variety of Nahuatl spoken in Huehuetán, Mexico is considered to have been closely related to or perhaps a dialect of Nawat.

== Status and usage ==
As of 2012, extensive online resources for learning Nawat are available at the website of linguist Alan R. King, including video lessons and a Facebook group. A video documentation project is also underway, in collaboration with the Living Tongues Institute, focusing on "Pipil culture, such as natural medicines, traditions, traditional games, agricultural practices, and childhood songs," which is intended for language learners.

The varieties of Nawat in Guatemala, Honduras, Nicaragua, and Costa Rica are now extinct. It was still spoken in Guatemala by almost nine thousand people in 1772.

In El Salvador, Nawat is endangered: it is spoken mostly by a few elderly speakers in the Salvadoran departments of Sonsonate, San Salvador, and Ahuachapán. The towns of Cuisnahuat and Santo Domingo de Guzmán have the highest concentration of speakers. Campbell's 1985 estimate (based on fieldwork conducted 1970–1976) was 200 speakers. Gordon (2005) reports only 20 speakers were left in 1987. Official Mexican reports have recorded as many as 2,000 speakers.

The exact number of speakers has been difficult to determine because persecution of Nawat speakers throughout the 20th century – including massacres after suppression of the 1932 Salvadoran peasant uprising and laws that made speaking Nawat illegal – made them conceal their use of the language. About 30,000 people were killed during the uprising over the course of a few weeks, and those who spoke Nawat outside their homes against the new rules "provoked shame and fear." A young Nawat language activist, Carlos Cortez, explained in 2010 that this fear is worse for older speakers.

A few small-scale projects to revitalize Nawat in El Salvador have been attempted since 1990. The Asociación Coordinadora de Comunidades Indígenas de El Salvador and Universidad Don Bosco of San Salvador have both produced some teaching materials. Monica Ward has developed an on-line language course. The Nawat Language Recovery Initiative is a grassroots association currently engaged in several activities including an ongoing language documentation project, and has also produced a range of printed materials. Thus, as the number of native speakers continues to dwindle, there is growing interest in some quarters in keeping the language alive, but as of 2002, the national government had not joined these efforts (cf. Various, 2002).

According to a 2009 report in El Diario de Hoy, Nawat had started to make a comeback as a result of the preservation and revitalization efforts of various non-profit organizations in conjunction with several universities, combined with a post-civil war resurgence of Pipil identity in El Salvador. In the 1980s, Nawat had about 200 speakers. By 2009, 3,000 people were participating in Nawat language learning programs, the vast majority being young people, giving rise to hopes that the language might be pulled back from the brink of extinction.

As of 2010, the town of Santo Domingo de Guzmán had a language nest, "Xuchikisa nawat" ("the house where Nawat blooms"), where children three to five years of age learned Nawat, run in cooperation with Don Bosco University.

In 2010, Salvadoran President Mauricio Funes awarded the National Culture Prize (Premio Nacional de Cultura 2010) to linguist Dr. Jorge Ernesto Lemus of Don Bosco University for his work with Nawat.

== Phonology ==
A man saying "I speak Nawat" in Nawat ("Naja nitajtaketza nawat") and Spanish ("Yo hablo náhuat")

Two salient features of Nawat are found in several Mexican dialects: the change of [t͡ɬ] to [t] and [u] rather than [o] as the predominant allophone of a single basic rounded vowel phoneme. These features are thus characteristic but not diagnostic.

However, Nawat /t/ corresponds to not only the two Classical Nahuatl sounds /t/ and /t͡ɬ/ but also a word final saltillo or glottal stop /ʔ/ in nominal plural suffixes (e.g. Nawat -met : Classical -meh) and verbal plural endings (Nawat -t present plural, -ket past plural, etc.). This fact has been claimed by Campbell to be diagnostic for the position of Nawat in a genetic classification, on the assumption that this /t/ is more archaic than the Classical Nahuatl reflex, where the direction change has been /t/ > /ʔ/ saltillo.

One other characteristic phonological feature is the merger in Nawat of original geminate /ll/ with single /l/.

== Grammar ==
Nawat lacks some grammatical features present in Classical Nahuatl, such as the past prefix o- in verbs. It distributes others differently: for example, 'subtractive' past formation, which is very common in the classical language, exists in Nawat but is much rarer. On the other hand, reduplication to form plural nouns, of more limited distribution in the language of the Aztecs, is greatly generalised in Nawat. Still other grammatical features that were productive in Classical Nahuatl have left only fossilised traces in Nawat: for example, synchronically Nawat has no postpositions, although a few lexical forms derive etymologically from older postpositional forms, e.g. apan 'river' < *'in/on the water', kujtan 'uncultivated land, forest' < *'under the trees'; these are synchronically unanalyzable in modern Nawat.

=== Noun phrase ===
Comparison: Noun phrase
	Nahuatl	Nawat	Nawat example
plural marking	limited in Classical	generalized	taj-tamal 'tortillas' sej-selek 'tender, fresh (pl.)'
plural formation	mostly suffixes	mostly redup.	taj-tamal 'tortillas' sej-selek 'tender, fresh (pl.)'
absolute -tli (Nawat -ti)	generally kept	often absent	mistun 'cat (abs.)'
construct /C_	-wi or zero	always zero	nu-uj 'my path'
inalienability	nouns generally have absolutes	many inalienables	*mey-ti, *nan-ti...
possessive prefixes	lose o before vowel	retain vowel (u)	nu-ikaw 'my brother'
articles	no generalized articles in Classical	definite ne, indefinite se	ne/se takat 'the/a man'
post/prepositions	postpositions	no post-, only prepositions	tik ne apan 'in the river'

Nawat has developed two widely used articles, definite ne and indefinite se. The demonstrative pronouns/determiners ini 'this, these' and uni 'that, those' are also distinctively Nawat in form. The obligatory marking of number extends in Nawat to almost all plural noun phrases (regardless of animacy), which will contain at least one plural form, most commonly marked by reduplication.

Many nouns are invariable for state, since -ti (cf. Classical -tli, the absolute suffix after consonants) is rarely added to polysyllabic noun stems, while the Classical postconsonantal construct suffix, -wi, is altogether unknown in Nawat: thus sin-ti 'maize' : nu-sin 'my maize', uj-ti 'way' : nu-uj 'my way', mistun 'cat' : nu-mistun 'my cat'.

An important number of nouns lack absolute forms and occur only inalienably possessed, e.g. nu-mey 'my hand' (but not *mey or *mey-ti), nu-nan 'my mother' (but not *nan or *nan-ti), thus further reducing the number of absolute-construct oppositions and the incidence of absolute -ti in comparison to Classical Nahuatl.

Postpositions have been eliminated from the Pipil grammatical system, and some monosyllabic prepositions originating from relationals have become grammaticalized.

=== Verbs ===
Comparison: Verb
	Nahuatl	Nawat	Nawat example
inflection	more complex	less complex; analytic substitutes	kuchi nemi katka 'used to stay and sleep'
past prefix o-	found in Classical + some dialects	no	ki-neki-k 'he wanted it' ni-kuch-ki 'I slept'
subtractive past formation	common in Classical + some dialects	limited	ki-neki-k 'he wanted it' ni-kuch-ki 'I slept'
past in -ki	no	yes	ki-neki-k 'he wanted it' ni-kuch-ki 'I slept'
perfect in -tuk	no	yes	ni-kuch-tuk 'I have slept'
imperfect	-ya	-tuya (stative)	ni-weli-tuya 'I could'
-skia, -tuskia conditionals	no	yes	ni-takwika-(tu)-skia 'I would sing/I would have sung'
initial prefixes /_V	lose i	mostly retain i	niajsi 'I arrive', kielkawa 'he forgets it'

To form the past tense, most Nawat verbs add -k (after vowels) or -ki (after consonants, following loss of the final vowel of the present stem), e.g. ki-neki 'he wants it' : ki-neki-k 'he wanted it', ki-mati 'he knows it' : ki-mat-ki 'he knew it'. The mechanism of simply removing the present stem vowel to form past stems, so common in Classical Nahuatl, is limited in Nawat to polysyllabic verb stems such as ki-talia 'he puts it' → ki-tali(j) 'he put it', mu-talua 'he runs' → mu-talu(j) 'he ran', and a handful of other verbs, e.g. ki-tajtani 'he asks him' → ki-tajtan 'he asked him'.

Nawat has a perfect in -tuk (synchronically unanalyzable), plural -tiwit. Another tense suffix, -tuya, functions both as a pluperfect (k-itz-tuya ne takat 'he had seen the man') and as an imperfect of stative verbs (inte weli-tuya 'he couldn't'), in the latter case having supplanted the -ya imperfect found in Mexican dialects.

Nawat has two conditional tenses, one in -skia expressing possible conditions and possible results, and one in -tuskia for impossible ones, although the distinction is sometimes blurred in practice. A future tense in -s (plural -sket) is attested but rarely used, a periphrastic future being preferred, e.g. yawi witz (or yu-witz) 'he will come'.

In serial constructions, the present tense (really the unmarked tense) is generally found except in the first verb, regardless of the tense of the latter, e.g. kineki / kinekik / kinekiskia kikwa 'he wants / wanted / would like to eat it'.

There are also some differences regarding how prefixes are attached to verb-initial stems; principally, that in Nawat the prefixes ni-, ti-, shi- and ki- when word-initial retain their i in most cases, e.g. ni-ajsi 'I arrive', ki-elkawa 'he forgets it'.

== See also ==
- Nawat grammar

== Bibliography ==
- Asociación Coordinadora de Comunidades Indígenas de El Salvador (ACCIES) (no date). Tukalmumachtiak Nahuat (Lengua Náhuat, Primer Ciclo).
- Arauz, Próspero (1960). El pipil de la región de los Itzalcos. (Edited by Pedro Geoffroy Rivas.) San Salvador: Ministerio de Cultura.
- Calvo Pacheco, Jorge Alfredo (2000). Vocabulario castellano-pipil pípil-kastíyan. Izalco, El Salvador.
- Campbell, Lyle (1985). The Pipil Language of El Salvador. Berlin: Mouton Publishers.
- Comisión Nacional de Rescate del Idioma Náhuat (1992a). Ma Timumachtika Nauataketsalis / Aprendamos el Idioma Náhuat. San Salvador: Concultura.
- Comisión Nacional de Rescate del Idioma Náhuat (1992b). Ma Timumachtika Nauataketsalis (Aprendamos el Idioma Náhuat). Guía Metodológica para la Enseñanza del Náhuat. San Salvador: Concultura.
- Geoffroy Rivas, Pedro (1969). El nawat de Cuscatlán: Apuntes para una gramática. San Salvador: Ministerio de Educación.
- King, Alan R. (2004). Gramática elemental del náhuat. El Salvador: IRIN.
- King, Alan R. (2004). El náhuat y su recuperación. In: Científica 5. San Salvador: Universidad Don Bosco.
- King, Alan R. (2011). Léxico del Náhuat Básico.
- King, Alan R. (2011). Timumachtikan!: Curso de lengua náhuat para principiantes adultos. Izalco, El Salvador: Iniciativa para la Recuperación del Idioma Náhuat.
- Ligorred, E. (1992). Lenguas Indígenas de México y Centroamérica. Madrid: Mapfre.
- Roque, Consuelo (2000). Nuestra escuela náhuat. San Salvador: Universidad de El Salvador.
- Todd, Juan G. (1953). Notas del náhuat de Nahuizalco. San Salvador: Editorial "Nosotros".
- Universidad de El Salvador, Secretaria de Docencia, Investigación Posgrado y Proyección Social. (1996) El náhuat de El Salvador: uno de los dialectos más importantes de la lengua nahua de la familia utoazteca junto con el náhuatl y el náhual. San Salvador: Editorial Universitaria, Universidad de El Salvador.
- Various (2002). Perfil de los pueblos indígenas en El Salvador. San Salvador.
- Ward, Monica (2001). A Template for CALL Programs for Endangered Languages. Online version
