= List of Salvadorans =

This is a list of notable people born in El Salvador or of Salvadoran descent (also see Salvadoran American).

República de El Salvador

Flag of El Salvador

Flag of El Salvador
Coat of arms

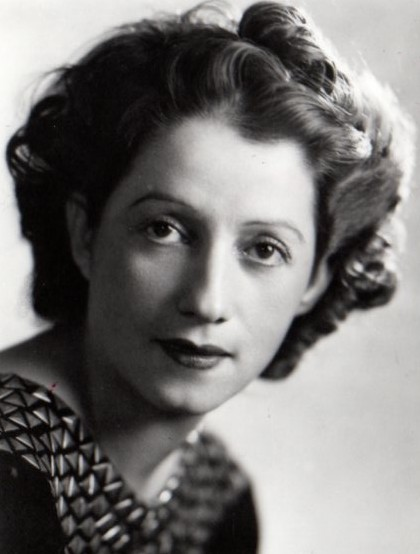
Consuelo de Saint-Exupéry, writer and artist

== Arts ==
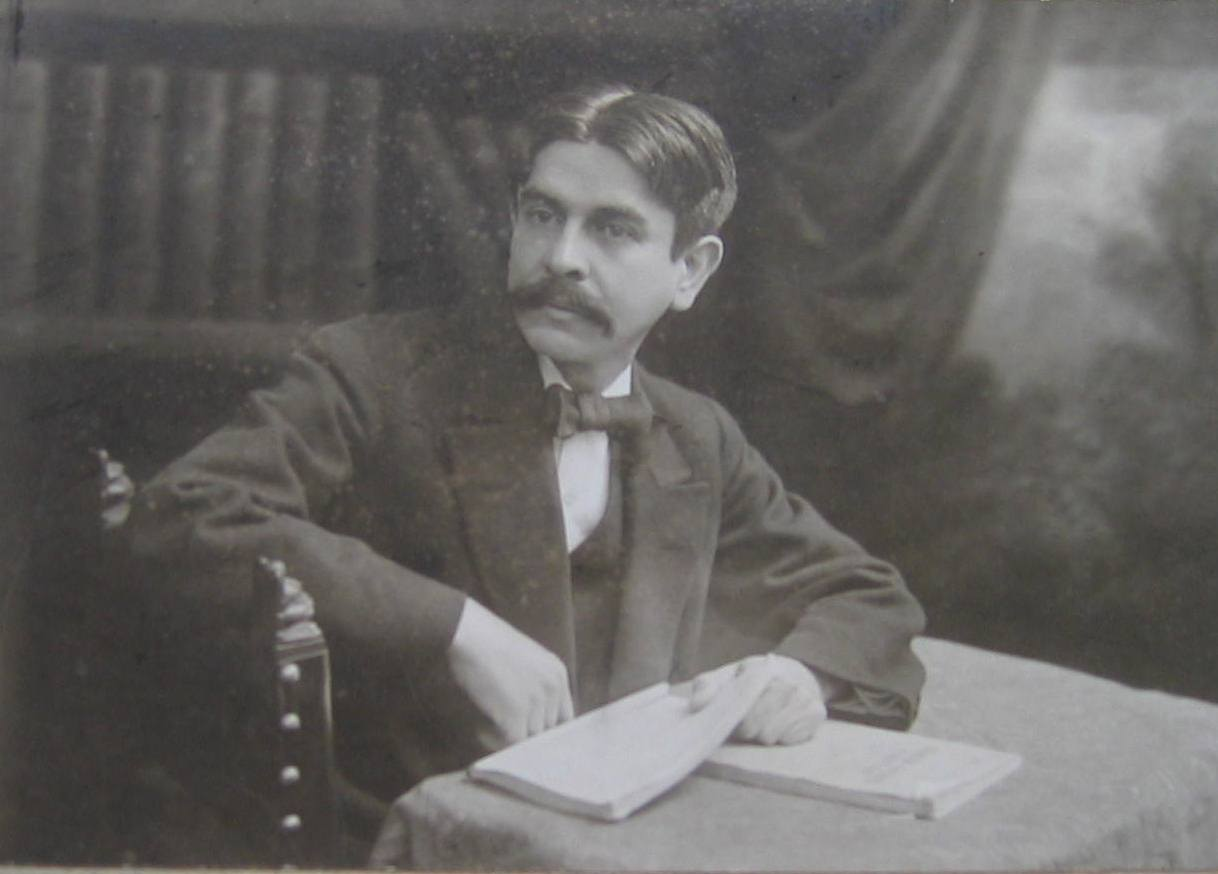
Alberto Masferrer, writer and philosopher

- Consuelo de Saint-Exupéry, painter, sculptor, and author; wife of Antoine de Saint-Exupéry
- Fernando Llort, painter and sculptor
- Noe Canjura, painter
- Nicolas F. Shi, painter
- Patricia Chica, filmmaker
- Ana Maria de Martinez, artist
- Toño Salazar, caricaturist
- Retna, graffiti artist
- Giovanni Gil, painter, engraver and watercolorist
- Rubén Martínez Bulnes, sculptor, architect

== Scholars, authors and educators ==
- Alberto Masferrer, intellectual
- Alfredo Betancourt, educator, philosopher
- Ana Sol Gutiérrez, educator
- Claribel Alegría, writer
- Claudia Lars, poet
- René Núñez Suárez, engineer
- Ignacio Martín-Baró, social psychologist and priest
- José Matías Delgado, writer, father of the Salvadoran fatherland
- Juan José Cañas, writer, the national anthem
- Manlio Argueta, novelist
- Marcos Villatoro, author
- Martin Guardado, applied linguist, sociolinguist, educator
- Matilde Elena López, poet, essayist, playwright
- Pedro Geoffroy Rivas, poet, scholar
- Roque Dalton, poet
- Salarrué (Salvador Salazar Arrué), novelist, poet, painter

== Entertainment ==
- Ana Villafañe, actress
- Gerardo Celasco, Miami-born Italian-Salvadoran actor
- Álvaro Torres, singer
- Cáthia, singer, season 4 of the American The Voice
- Efren Ramirez, actor
- Isabel Dada, actress
- J.D. Pardo, actor
- DJ Keoki, techno DJ
- Martina Topley-Bird, vocalist and songwriter
- Pescozada, Latino rap artist
- Pete Sandoval, drummer for the group Morbid Angel
- The Fabulous Wonder Twins, entertainment personalities
- Fernanfloo, Comedy YouTuber
- Julio Torres, writer, comedian, actor, and producer

== Fashion designers and models ==
- Christy Turlington, American-Salvadoran supermodel
- Francesca Miranda, internationally renowned fashion designer

== Politicians ==
- Alfredo Cristiani, former president
- Álvaro Magaña, banker and interim president
- Ana Maria, guerrilla leader
- Anastasio Aquino, King of the Nonualco tribes, who defeated the government army in 1833
- Antonio Saca, former president
- Armando Calderón Sol, former president
- Carlos Eugenio Vides Casanova, defense minister, convicted of human rights abuses
- Cayetano Carpio, leader of the leftist insurgency, founder of the FPL.
- Egriselda López, diplomat, Permanent Representative to the UN
- Domingo Monterrosa, military commander of the Armed Forces of El Salvador during the Salvadoran Civil War
- Farabundo Martí, revolutionary
- Francisco Flores, former president
- Gerardo Barrios, liberal president
- Guillermo Ungo, opposition leader and former vice-president
- Joaquín Eufrasio Guzmán, national hero
- Joaquín Villalobos, noted guerrilla leader during Salvadoran civil war
- José Inocencio Alas, former priest and activist
- José Matías Delgado, national hero
- José Napoleón Duarte, former president
- Juan Rafael Bustillo, former Head of the Salvadoran Air Force
- Manuel José Arce, decorated General, president of the Federal Republic of Central America, 1825–1829
- Mauricio Funes, former president
- Maximiliano Hernández Martínez, dictator-president
- Nayib Bukele, current president
- Roberto D'Aubuisson, politician, ARENA
- Rutilio Grande, martyred priest
- Marisol Argueta de Barillas, chancellor, ARENA, Senior Director World Economic Forum

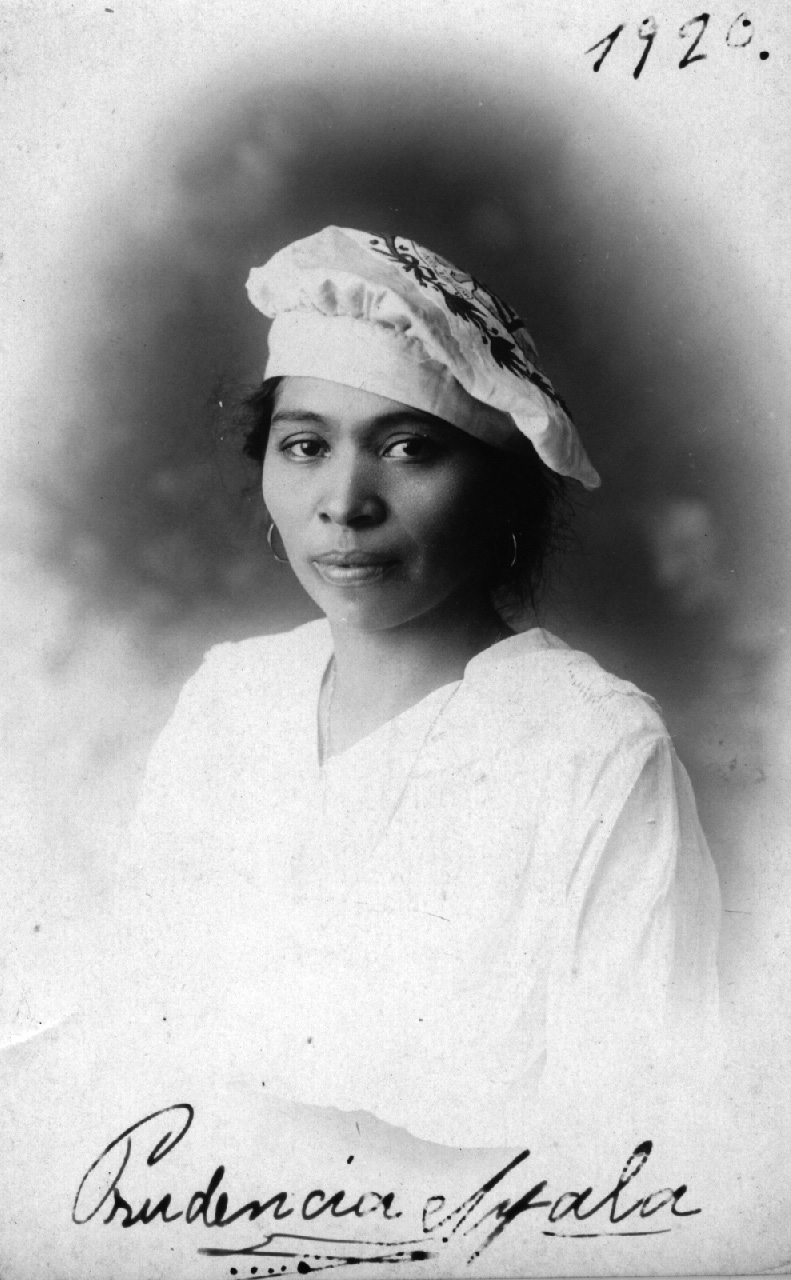
Prudencia Ayala, social activist

== Humanitarians and activists ==
- María Álvarez de Guillén, women's rights activist, writer, and businessperson
- Prudencia Ayala (1885–1936), social activist and writer
- José Castellanos Contreras (1893–1977), humanitarian
- Rosa Amelia Guzmán, suffragette and journalist
- Vicky Guzmán (born 1944), medical doctor and humanitarian
- José Gustavo Guerrero (1876–1958), lawyer, diplomat, humanitarian, first president of the International Court of Justice
- Morena Herrera, women's rights activist
- Erick Iván Ortiz (born 1991), LGBTQ+ activist, politician
- María Teresa Rivera, women's rights activist
- Óscar Romero (1917–1980), humanitarian, fourth Archbishop of San Salvador

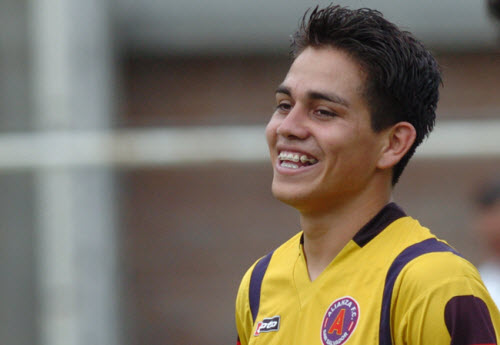
Rodolfo Zelaya, soccer player

== Sports ==
- Ronnie Aguilar, basketball player
- Dennis Alas, soccer player
- Jaime Alas, soccer player
- Rafael Alfaro, swimmer
- Arturo Alvarez, soccer player
- Frank Avelar, boxer
- Juan Barahona, soccer player
- Pamela Benítez, swimmer
- Léster Blanco, soccer player
- Nelson Bonilla, soccer player
- Junior Burgos, soccer player
- Rosemary Casals, tennis player
- Darwin Cerén, soccer player
- Óscar Cerén, soccer player
- Mauricio Cienfuegos, soccer player
- Jose Cortez, former NFL football player
- Raúl Díaz Arce, soccer player
- Roberto Domínguez, soccer player
- Carlos Figueroa, judoka
- Edwin Figueroa, mixed martial arts fighter
- Andrés Flores, soccer player
- Evelyn García, cyclist
- Mágico González, soccer player
- Tomás Granitto, soccer player
- Carlos Hernandez, boxer
- Emerson Hernández, racewalker
- Gladys Landaverde, runner
- Roberto López, rower
- Ivan Menjivar, mixed martial arts fighter
- Melissa Mikec, sports shooter
- Alfredo Pacheco, soccer player
- Denis Pineda, soccer player
- Steve Purdy, soccer player
- Joaquín Rivas, soccer player
- Steve Rodriguez, baseball player
- Ramón Sánchez, soccer player
- Ricardo Saprissa, athlete, coach, and sport promoter
- Rodolfo Zelaya, soccer player

== Other ==
- Victoriano Gómez Urrutia, convicted double murderer, rapist, and suspected serial killer. Last person to be executed by El Salvador
- Ingmar Guandique, undocumented U.S. immigrant convicted in the death of Chandra Levy and two other American women
- Jose Domingo Medrano, doctor and medical inventor
- Antonia Ramírez, singer, writer and language activist
- Adela del Rosario Cabezas de Allwood early woman doctor
- José Salvador Alvarenga, claimed to have spent 13 months adrift in a fishing boat in the Pacific Ocean

== See also ==
- List of Salvadoran Americans
- List of Salvadorian Olympians
