= Viscount del Castillo de Almansa =

- Heraldic Coronet of Spanish Grandee
- Creation date: 3 December 1773
- Created by: Charles III of Spain
- First holder: Miguel de Almansa y Uriarte
- Present holder: José Fernando de Almansa y Moreno-Barreda
- Status: Extant
- Former seats: Palacio de los vizcondes del Castillo de Almansa and Castillo de Almansa

The Viscount del Castillo de Almansa is a Spanish hereditary title of nobility created by Carlos III on 3 December 1773 for Miguel de Almansa y Uriarte. The title is currently held by José Fernando de Almansa y Moreno-Barreda, 10th Viscount of Castillo de Almansa and Grandee of Spain. The Viscount of Almansa has royal Muslim Granadian ancestry.

== Present holder ==
The present holder of the viscountcy is José Fernando de Almansa y Moreno-Barreda, 10th Viscount of Castillo Almansa. José Fernando de Almansa y Moreno-Barreda is a Spanish diplomat and former Head of the House of His Majesty the King of Spain.

Fernando Almansa studied law at the University of Deusto before entering the diplomatic service in 1974. He was stationed in Brussels, Mexico and Moscow.

Fernando Almansa served as Head of the House of the Majesty of him King Juan Carlos I from 1993 to 2002. On June 24, 2002, the King Juan Carlos I appointed him Grandee of Spain and later, he was awarded the Grand Cross of the Order of Carlos III.

== Viscounts of Castillo de Almansa ==
- Miguel de Almansa y Uriarte, 1st Viscount of Castillo de Almansa
- Rafael de Almansa y Uriarte, 2nd Viscount of Castillo de Almansa
- Micaela de Almansa y Careaga, 3rd Viscount of Castillo de Almansa
- Miguel de Almansa y Almansa, 4th Viscount of Castillo de Almansa
- Miguel de Almansa y Pérez de Herrasti, 5th Viscount of Castillo de Almansa
- Fernando de Almansa y Cañavate, 6th Viscount of Castillo de Almansa
- Fernando de Almansa y Arroyo, 7th Viscount of Castillo de Almansa and 9th Marquess of Cadimo
- José María de Almansa y Cuevas, 8th Viscount of Castillo de Almansa and 10th Marquess of Cadimo
- Fernando de Almansa y Valverde, 9th Viscount of Castillo de Almansa and 11th Marquess of Cadimo
- José Fernando de Almansa y Moreno-Barreda, 10th Viscount of Castillo de Almansa and Grandee of Spain

== History ==
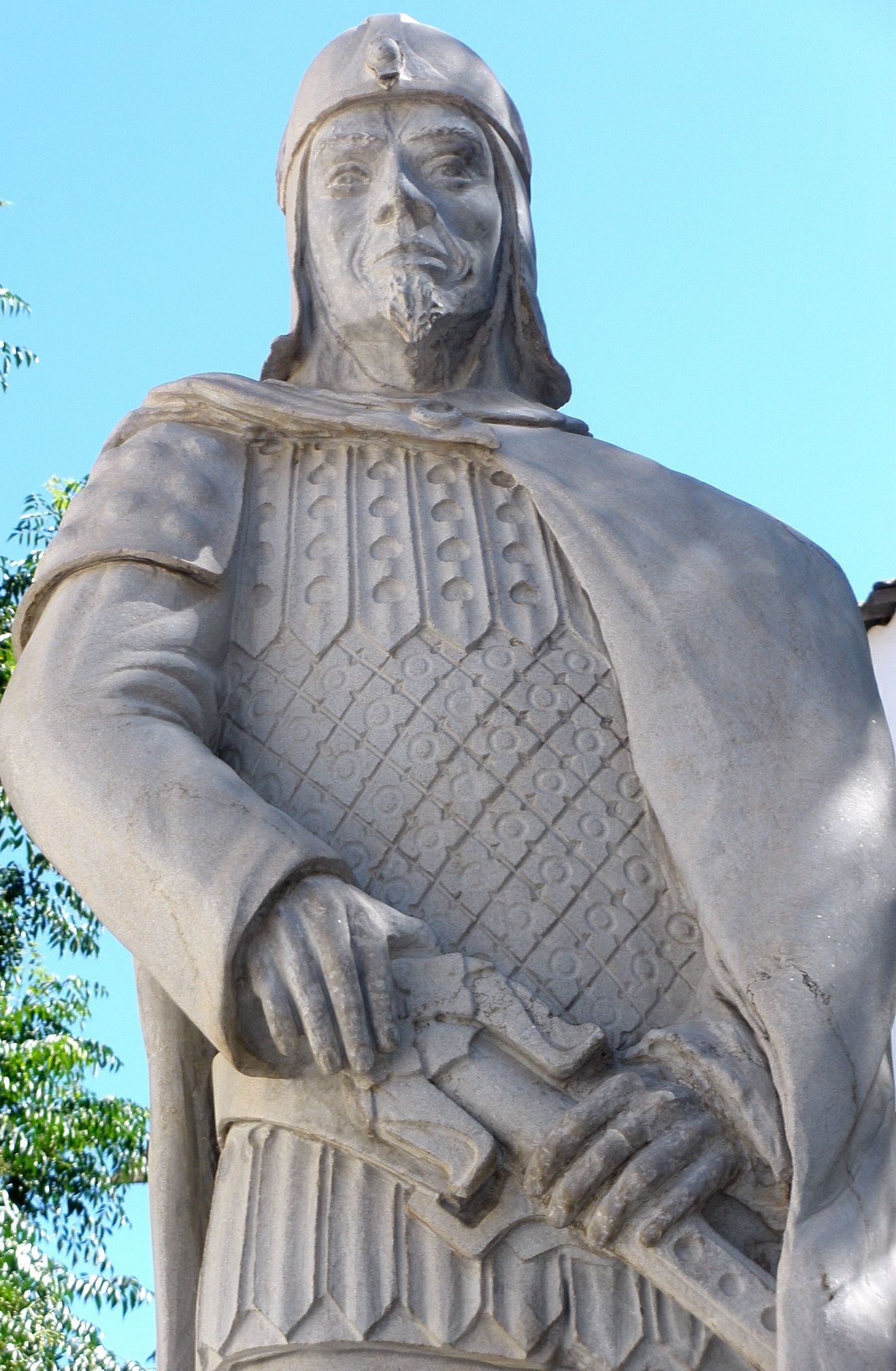
Statue of Pedro de Granada, from the royal Nasrid dynasty, cousin of the last ruler of the Emirate of Granada.

The Viscounts of the Castle of Almansa trace their Castilian-Moorish ancestry through their familial ties to the noble lineages of Venegas de Careaga, Gibaje, Ballesteros, and de Medrano in Almería, which were intertwined with descendants of Pedro de Granada, from the Nasrid dynasty, a Granadian Moorish royal family. This connection is established through the wife of Rafael de Almansa, the second Viscount of the Castle of Almansa. Rafael was the Alcaide of the Castle of San Pedro and succeeded to the viscountcy in 1796 after the death of his brother Miguel.

Rafael de Almansa's wife María Careaga Venegas y Granada was the daughter of José Avís Venegas de Careaga y Gibaje (b. 1676) and María Serafina de Ballesteros y Medrano, married in 1699 at the parish of El Sagrario in Almería. María Serafina de Ballesteros y Medrano was born in Almería on September 18, 1681, and was baptized three days later, on September 21, with her uncle Andrés de Medrano acting as her godfather. María Serafina de Ballesteros y Medrano was the daughter of Mateo de Ballesteros and Francisca de Medrano, from the noble House of Medrano in Almería.

Almansa's wife María Careaga Venegas y Granada was the maternal granddaughter of Rodrigo de Medrano and María de Gibaje, and the paternal granddaughter of Fernando de Ballesteros and Mariana de Benavides. His wife María Careaga Venegas y Granada connects to the royal Granada-Venegas family [es], which traced its roots back to Cidi Yahya Alnayar, also known as Pedro de Granada [es], a key Nasrid figure, cousin of Sultan Boabdil and brother-in-law of Muhammad XII el Zagal. Rafael's wife María Careaga Venegas y Granada inherited this distinguished heritage, directly linking her to the royal Nasrid dynasty. Rafael de Almansa and María Careaga Venegas y Granada had a daughter who succeeded them, Micaela de Almansa y Careaga, 3rd Viscountess of the Castle of Almansa.

=== Palace of the Viscounts of the Castle of Almansa ===
The Palace of the Viscounts of the Castle of Almansa is an 18th-century palatial residence located in the city of Almería (province of Almería, Andalusia, Spain), which currently houses the Provincial Historical Archive. The palace has two monumental entrances on different streets (Campomanes and Infanta), one of which corresponds to the former house of Francisco Jover y Tovar. This entrance, designed by the Almerian architect Trinidad Cuartara, includes an access for carriages. The palace was built for Miguel de Almansa y Uriarte, the first Viscount of the Castle of Almansa, with construction taking place between 1773 or 1775 and 1780. In 1988, it underwent a major renovation, after which the building was repurposed to house the Provincial Historical Archive.

The palace is an example of transitional architecture, bridging the late Baroque and early Neoclassical styles. This transitional character is evident in the irregularly distributed openings of the main floor (granting them a quality that diverges from strict Enlightenment rigor) and in the details that combine Baroque elements (such as the ledges) with Neoclassical features (such as the semicircular pediments crowning them). It was declared a Cultural Heritage Site in 1985 under the category of "Other."
