= Sonsonate Department =

Department of El Salvador

Sonsonate
- Department
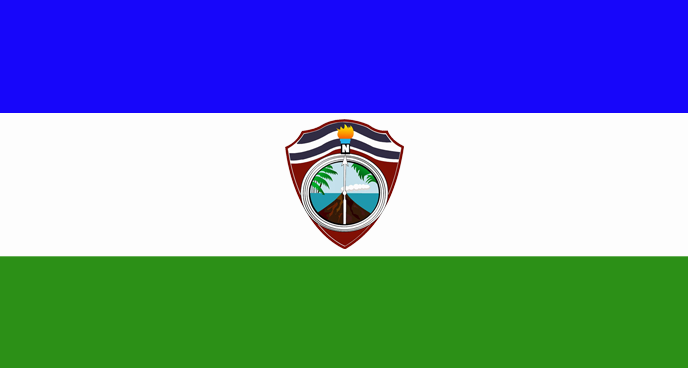
- Flag

- Location within El Salvador
- Coordinates: 13°42′11″N 89°41′35″W
- Country: El Salvador
- Created (given current status): 1824
- Seat: Sonsonate
- Largest city: Izalco

Area
  - Total: 1,225.8 km^{2} (473.3 sq mi)
  - Rank: Ranked 9th

Population (2024)
  - Total: 470,455
  - Rank: Ranked 6th
  - Density: 383.79/km^{2} (994.02/sq mi)
- Time zone: UTC−6 (CST)
- ISO 3166 code: SV-SO

Sonsonate (Spanish pronunciation: [sonsoˈnate]) is a department of El Salvador in the western part of the country. The capital is Sonsonate.

The department has an area of 1,226 km^{2} (473 sq mi).

Created on June 12, 1824, the El Salvador National Parliament decided on January 29, 1859, to separate the cities of Apaneca, San Pedro Puxtla, Guaymango, and Jujutla from the department and transfer these cities to the Santa Ana Department.

Sonsonate was the second capital of the Federal Republic of Central America in 1834.

The department remains a center of Pipil culture in the country, preserving several ancient traditions and home to most of the few remaining Nahua speakers in El Salvador.

It is a predominantly agricultural area, with extremely fertile volcanic soils that were once the most valuable resource in Central America for the Spanish conquistadors, who profited from its ancient cacao plantations. Its name, meaning "Place of 400 rivers" or "Place of many waters", is fitting as the department receives well over 2,000 mm (79 in) of rain a year.

== Municipalities ==
1. Sonsonate Centro
2. Sonsonate Este
3. Sonsonate Norte
4. Sonsonate Oeste

== Districts ==
1. Acajutla
2. Armenia
3. Caluco
4. Cuisnahuat
5. Izalco
6. Juayúa
7. Nahuizalco
8. Nahulingo
9. Salcoatitán
10. San Antonio del Monte
11. San Julián
12. Santa Catarina Masahuat
13. Santa Isabel Ishuatán
14. Santo Domingo de Guzmán
15. Sonsonate
16. Sonzacate

== History ==
It is located 65 kilometers from San Salvador and at an elevation of 225 meters. It is situated along the Centzunat, Sensunapan, or Grande River of Sonsonate. It is connected to the capital and the Port of Acajutla by modern highways, as well as to Santa Ana and Ahuachapán.

Sonsonate was founded in 1552 by Antonio Rodriguez, initially named Villa del Sagrado Espíritu. In 1553, Pedro Ramírez de Quiñones and Bishop Francisco Marroquín renamed it Villa de la Santísima Trinidad. On April 1, 1824, it was granted city status, and on June 12 of the same year, it became the departmental capital. In 1834, it served as the capital of the Central American Federation under President Senator José Gregorio Salazar.

Its parochial church, while inspired by colonial style, dates from after independence, having been blessed on April 1, 1887. The church of Santo Domingo, constructed with calicanto, brick, and tile, was built in 1726 under the patronage of the Santo Ángel de la Guarda. From 1834, it was home to the federal authorities of Central America, and from 1841 to 1846, it housed a secondary school directed by Friar Jerónimo Zelaya.

In the park "Rafael Campos", a column with a marble bust of ex-president Rafael Campo (1813–1890) was erected in 1913. He was known as the "Salvadoran Aristides". During his administration, the first map of El Salvador (1858) was created. The national army, under the command of General Ramón Belloso, fought and defeated William Walker's filibusters in the battles of Masaya and Granada, Nicaragua.

Sonsonate is a corruption of Centzunat, a Pipil word meaning "Big River" and literally "Four hundred waters".

== Notable people ==
Rafael Barrientos was born in Armenia, department of Sonsonate in July, 1919. He founded the "Lito Barrientos" Orchestra. Among the prizes received were: "The Congo of gold", in Barranquilla, Colombia; "The Order of José Matías Delgado" and "Prodigal Son of El Salvador".

Prudencia Ayala was born in Sonzacate on April 28, 1885. An influential suffragist, she was the first woman to run for President of El Salvador at a time when women did not yet have the right to vote. She supported labor unions and women's rights. She also supported the peasant's uprising of 1932.

Jose Roberto Cea was born in Izalco on April 10, 1939. He is a poet, novelist, narrator, and editor. He was part of the Committed Generation literary group. His most well-known plays include: Las escenas cumbres, Teatro de y una comarca Centro Americana. His novels include: En este paisito nos tocó y no me corro. His narrative works include: Chumbulúm el pececito de Darwin and Sihuapil Taqueisali.

Irma Dimas, from Sonsonate, was Miss El Salvador in 2005.

Claudia Lars was born in Armenia on December 20, 1899, and died in San Salvador on July 22, 1974. Her birth name was Margarita del Carmen Brannon Vega. She was a poet who cultivated the sonnet and romance forms. She is considered the greatest lyrical voice of 20th-century El Salvador. Her works include: "Estrellas en el pozo", "Canción redonda", "La casa de vidrio", "Donde llegan los pasos", "Tierra de infancia", "Sobre el ángel y el hombre", and "Nuestro pulsante mundo".

Francisco Malespín was born in Izalco on September 28, 1806 and was murdered in 1846. He was a defender of culture and art. He served as president of El Salvador in 1844.

Óscar Osorio was born in Sonsonate on December 14, 1910, and died in The United States on March 6, 1969. While corruption and repression were features of his government, his achievements in foreign policy were recognized. During his government, the Code of Work and the Defense Law of the Democratic and Constitutional Order were enacted, and projects such as the "Chorrera del Guayabo" or the "November 5th" Dam, the Port of Acajutla, and the Institute of Urban Housing were constructed.

Salvador Salazar Arrué (Salarrué) was born in Sonsonate on October 22, 1899, and died in Los Planes de Renderos on November 28, 1975. He wrote stories, novels, poetry, and painted. He appreciated the humility of rural people and belonged to the "Native" movement. Among his visual artworks are: La monja Blanca, La isla roja, La ciguanaba. His literary works include: Cuentos de barro, Cristo Negro, El Señor de la burbuja, O-Yarkandal, Eso y más, Cuentos de cipotes, and Mundo nomasito - una isla en el cielo.

== Agriculture ==
The main agricultural products cultivated are basic grains, coffee, cotton, sugar cane, coconut, fruits, balsam trees, palm, tulle, and orchard plants.

Notable manufacturing industries include those producing dairy products, panela, sugar, mud tiles and bricks, clothing, footwear, candles, soaps, and leather articles. Coconut trees are plentiful in the surrounding areas, leading the city to be poetically known as "the city of the palms".

The average annual temperature is 25 °C (77 °F).

== Traditions ==
Years ago, there was an exchange of products between the inhabitants of Cuisnahuat (Sonsonate) and Jayaque (La Libertad). This involved mutual visits between the towns: Cuisnahuat visited Jayaque during the rainy season, and Jayaque visited Cuisnahuat during the dry season. Failure to complete the visit could lead to conflict between the towns.

To commemorate this, two annual pilgrimages are held: from Cuisnahuat to Jayaque in July (rainy season) and from Jayaque to Cuisnahuat in November (dry season). During these months, each town celebrates its patron saint festivities, enhanced by the presence of the "Cumpas", referred to as Saints and Siblings.

Another Sonsonate tradition is the "candle of the stick", which takes place towards the end of the year. The city's mayor appoints the "mayor of the night festivities". The city mayor grants the "mayor of the night festivities" authority to govern the city for one night. The first order issued by this temporary mayor is to "capture" anyone found outside their home within the city. Those "captured" must pay the "pasayuba bosu" (a Nahuat expression meaning 'pay the ticket'). All money collected is donated to charity institutions.

== Typical food ==
Sonsonate offers a variety of typical foods, notably yucca, which is usually eaten boiled or fried. Whether boiled or fried, it is often served with "pepescas" (small fish) and fritada.

Corn tamales and hen tamales are often eaten with corn atol or a cup of coffee, depending on the time of day.

Another traditional food in Sonsonate is "sopa de patas", often eaten with a beer or soda.

== Villages ==
- Cantón El Sunza
