= Aniceto Porsisoca =

Salvadoran comedian (1938–1993)

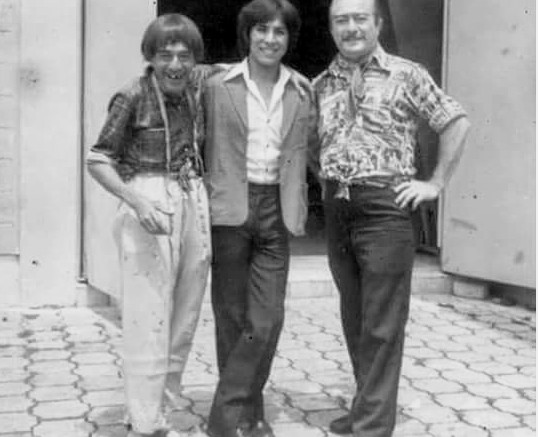
Carlos Álvarez Pineda better known as Aniceto Porsisoca together with the announcer Paco Medina Funes

Aniceto Porsisoca (born Carlos Álvarez Pineda) (24 February 1928 – 9 June 1993) was a Salvadoran comedian.

== Early life and education ==
Porsisoca was born in Santa Ana, El Salvador. At age 14, he enrolled in the Escuela Normal de Maestros de San Salvador with the goal of becoming a teacher. After leaving school temporarily due to his father's death, Porsisoca eventually became a teacher.

== Career ==
Early in his career, Porsisoca worked on radio as a comedic narrator alongside Paco Medina Funes. He also appeared on television shows, including Las Puntadas de Aniceto, in comic books and magazines.

Porsisoca was declared Hijo Meritísimo de El Salvador for his contributions to the national arts.

== Personal life ==
Porsisoca was married to a woman that he referred to "La Peche" (The Skinny Woman) in his act. His dog's name was "Huracán". Porsisoca bragged that his dog was so obedient that he once urged the dog to attack someone by yelling "Huracán, ataque" (Attack, Huracán). In response, Huracán fell to the floor with a heart attack.

=== Death ===
He died on 6 June 1993, due to throat cancer.

== Quotations ==
Aniceto contributed phrases to the Salvadorean vocabulary such as:

- "Uno de cipote es tonto" (One is dumb when young).
- "Esto no lo venden en la tienda de la esquina, solo Dios lo da," (They don't sell this at the corner store, only God can give it) which he would often say while tapping on his forehead and referring to his intelligence.
- "Yo te lo dije, Chele" (I told you, Whitey), referring to his comedy partner Paco Medina Funes (and later Rey "El Chele" Ávila), who played the straight man in the comedic duo.
- "El fisico me compromete" (My physical appearance gets me in trouble).

== See also ==
- List of comedians
- List of Salvadorans
