= Francisco de Medrano y Villa =

Francisco de Medrano y Villa (1570 in Seville – 1607) was a priest and lyric poet of the Spanish Renaissance, regarded as one of Spain's best imitators of Horace, comparing favorably in that respect with Luis de León. Francisco was a member of the noble House of Medrano, patrons and contributors to the Spanish Golden Age. His poetry was posthumously published in Palermo in 1617, together with the works of his friend Pedro Venegas de Saavedra.

== Life ==
Francisco de Medrano y Villa was born in Seville in 1570. He was the son of Miguel de Medrano and María de Villa. Francisco de Medrano died in 1607.

=== Education ===
Francisco de Medrano, from a wealthy Sevillian banking and commercial family, began his studies at San Hermenegildo College under the Jesuits. In 1586, he joined the novitiate of Montilla (Córdoba) and later studied arts in Córdoba (1587).

=== Early career ===
By 1590, he was assigned to the Jesuit province of Castile, specifically Salamanca, where he absorbed Renaissance poetic styles influenced by Juan Boscán, Garcilaso de la Vega, and Fray Luis de León. Ordained as a priest in 1594, he taught at Jesuit colleges in Villagarcía de Campos, Monterrei, and Valladolid, before returning to Salamanca. A trip to Rome, mentioned in his poetry, preceded his departure from the Jesuits in 1602, likely due to sympathizing with rebellious members. By 1606, he settled in Seville as a secular priest. After he left the Society of Jesus in 1602, he dedicated himself fully to poetry.

=== Poetry ===
His most prolific literary period followed, during which he composed sonnets dedicated to poet Hernando de Soria Galvarro, Alonso de Santillán (who left the Jesuits with him and later died in a shipwreck), Juan Antonio del Alcázar (nephew of Baltasar del Alcázar), and Juan de Sol, bishop of Bona (Algeria). He was also part of Seville’s literary circle around poet and patron Juan de Arguijo (whom he called Argío).

Medrano’s work reflected a classical poetic style, heavily influenced by the Salamanca poets of the 16th century. He focused largely on translating classical texts and producing poetry inspired by authors of a similar vein, particularly Horace. His contemporaries, including the critic Adolfo de Castro, praised him as the finest Spanish imitator of Horace. Medrano’s poetry stood out for avoiding the Gongorist style popular in Spanish literature at the time. He wrote 52 sonnets known for their sensual undertones, as well as various odes and romances. Among his most famous pieces is "The Prophecy of the Tagus," which closely mirrors a work of the same name by Fray Luis de León.

== Works ==
His poetry was influenced by works of Horace and Torquato Tasso. He wrote chiefly sonnets. Medrano's works were published at Palermo (1617) as an appendix to the imitation of Ovid's "Remedia Amoris" by Pedro Venegas de Saavedra, a poet of Seville. According to the Spanish critic Adolfo de Castro, Medrano is the best of the Spanish imitators of Horace, comparing favorably in that respect with Luis de León. An example of this imitation can be seen in Medrano's X ode, which is framed as a farewell poem and mirrors Horace’s Ode I, 3 (Virgil: Off to Greece). Endowed with literary taste, he writes in good Spanish, and his style is free from the gongorism of his time. Among the odes of Medrano, his "La profecia del Tajo" is very similar to one of Luis de León of the same title. Although both are based upon Horace's ode to Mark Antony in which he would separate him and Cleopatra, there is a great difference between them. León's ode departs from the original of Horace, while Medrano's is an imitation of the latter so close as to amount almost to a translation. The poems of Medrano are reprinted in La biblioteca de autores españoles.

=== Translator and Poet of the Spanish Golden Age ===
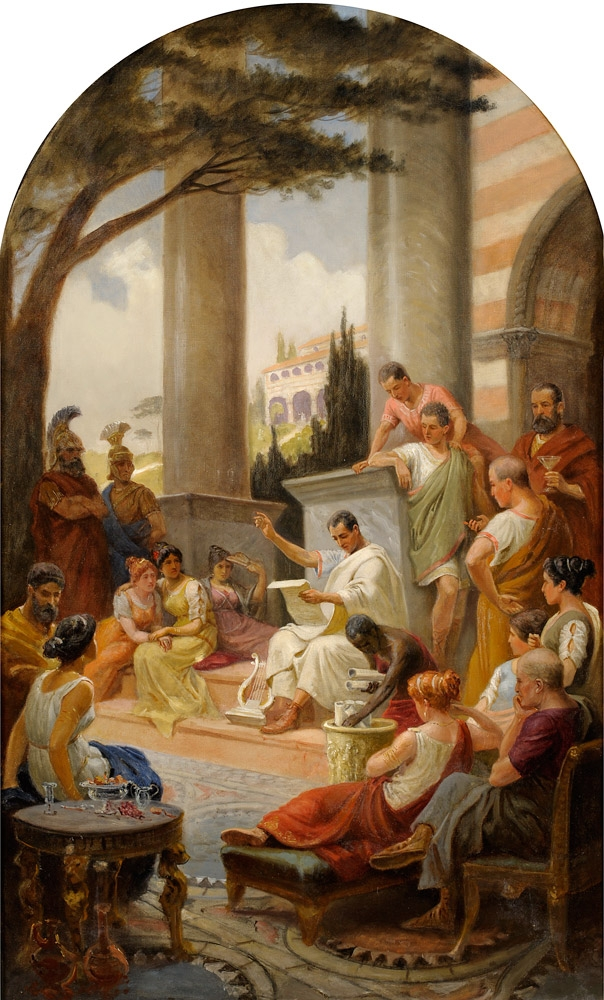
Horace reciting his verses, by Adalbert von Rössler.

Medrano's moral sonnets like the one beginning with '(What worries, Flavio, are these? What heaps of different troubles assail me?)' represent a small yet impactful aspect of his literary work. These moral sonnets exude a Latin gravitas "reminiscent of the Argensolas and occasionally anticipate the style of Quevedo."

On the other hand, Medrano's love sonnets, while mainly following a recognizable Petrarchan pattern, demonstrate "a unique ability to explore intimate relationships with a freshness reminiscent of Aldana." What is noteworthy in this context is not only Medrano's adept handling of the interplay between negative and positive aspects but, more importantly, the carefully chosen vocabulary employed to express this nuanced process. During the early 17th century, Andalusian poets demonstrated a remarkable skill that contributed to the development of what could be termed a 'new classicism,' indirectly influencing Herrera's peripheral involvement in this movement. An influential figure in this context is the former Jesuit, Francisco de Medrano, who "penned the majority of his poems in Seville during the last five years of his life."

Horace, a profound influence on Spanish lyric poetry from the sixteenth century onward, served as a significant source. Medrano stands out as "one of the final and most brilliant figures in a lineage of translators, a group that includes Luis de Leon (1527-91), a prominent poet from an earlier period, and various minor Sevillian poets featured in Herrera's Anotaciones."

While many of Medrano's versions of the Odes demonstrate remarkable fidelity, labeling him merely as a 'translator' overlooks the exceptional accomplishment inherent in these poems. The concept of 'originality' in the realm of translations may seem paradoxical, yet Medrano's reinterpretations of Horace deviate in two crucial ways from earlier renditions, underscoring the creative ingenuity that distinguishes him from his peers:

The first deviation is formal, involving the choice to discard the lira-type stanza, which, for Luis de Leon, had appeared as the closest equivalent to the Horatian strophe, and notably, to attempt to capture the essence of Horace's succinct final lines. Thus, the conclusion of Ode 1, xxii ('Integer vitae scelerisque purus...'; The man of upright life, free of guilt) in Medrano's version reads: "In as much as the sky multiplies its turns, so that the sun sends light to the world, I will love Flora, the one who sweetly laughs, the one who sweetly converses." He adeptly captured both the reverberating effect and the inherent rhythm of the Latin expression, 'Dulce ridentem Lalagen amabo, / Dulce loquentem' (I shall love sweetly smiling, sweetly chattering Lalage). Historians note Medrano's entire poem, akin to others, "remarkably reproduces what Damaso Alonso refers to as the 'rhythm of thought' from the original with exceptional fidelity." While prior translators typically aim for a literal rendition, Medrano "frequently excises entire passages or occasionally combines parts of two separate odes within the same poem."

The second deviation is when Medrano systematically eliminates or simplifies elements that a seventeenth-century poet might perceive as 'dead matter' such as references to ancient Rome. Alternatively, he replaces original references with contemporary ones. For instance, in one of Medrano's poems, he mentions the Inca Empire: 'Quien trocara, prudente, / por cuanto el Inga atesoro, el cabello / de Amarili?' (What wise man would exchange Amaryllis's hair for all the Inca's treasure?).

Historians of poetry are impressed by Medrano's adept use of short lines and his ability to keep the natural flow of the original text; Medrano "remains remarkably faithful to what he perceives as the spirit of Horace." Damaso Alonso highlights, "there is an evident disparity between Horace's characteristic cynicism and what he terms Medrano's essential honesty." Despite departing from his original, Medrano consistently holds the example of Horace in high regard, and the quality of his best sonnets, suggests a robust independent talent that doesn't rely on obvious models to assert itself. What appears certain, however, is the "conscious 'classicism' embedded in Medrano's endeavor."

== Translations ==
Two sonnets by Francisco de Medrano were translated into English by Henry Wadsworth Longfellow. They are Art and Nature and The Two Harvests.

== Bibliography ==
- Manuel Mañas Núñez, Horacio (Oda 2, 16) en Francisco de Medrano (Oda XXIV) (in Spanish).
- Horacio en España by Marcelino Menendez y Pelayo, Volume I, II edition, Madrid, 1885.
