= José Amador de los Ríos =

Spanish intellectual

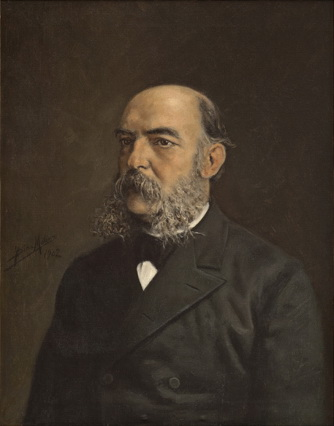

José Amador de los Ríos y Serrano (30 April 1818 – 17 February 1878) was a Spanish historian, archaeologist, literary critic, and professor. Born in Baena (Córdoba) and deceased in Seville, he was a prominent figure in 19th-century Spanish intellectual life, serving as an academician of both the Real Academia de la Historia and the Real Academia de Bellas Artes de San Fernando, as well as Director of the Museo Arqueológico Nacional.

== Biography and Academic Career ==
Amador de los Ríos studied humanities and art in Córdoba and Madrid, graduating from the Universidad Central de Madrid (now Complutense University of Madrid). In 1844, he published Sevilla pintoresca and was appointed secretary of the Comisión Central de Monumentos. With Antonio de Zabaleta, he co-directed the Boletín Español de Arquitectura (1846), the first Spanish journal dedicated exclusively to architecture.

In 1848, he was elected an académico de número of the Real Academia de la Historia. He was appointed Chair of Critical History and Spanish Literature at the Universidad Central in 1853, later rising to Dean of the Faculty of Philosophy and Letters. In 1868, he was appointed Director of the Museo Arqueológico Nacional and directed the monumental state project Monumentos Arquitectónicos de España.

== Key Contributions and Art History ==
In 1852, Amador de los Ríos edited and published the complete works of Íñigo López de Mendoza, 1st Marquis of Santillana. During his 1859 induction speech at the Real Academia de Bellas Artes de San Fernando—titled El estilo mudéjar en la arquitectura—he coined and conceptualized the term mudejarismo to define the application of Islamic decorative styles and methods to Christian architecture and wares. He was also a pioneer in Spanish archaeology, publishing key studies on Visigothic antiquities, notably the Treasure of Guarrazar.

== Literary Historiography ==
In 1861, he published the first volume of his Historia crítica de la literatura española, the first general history of Spanish literature written within Spain. Though left incomplete at seven volumes, the work embodied his liberal-romantic historiographical vision, conceiving Spain as a unified entity rooted in Castilian and Catholic traditions connected by an idea luminosa ("luminous idea").

Countering foreign scholars who viewed medieval Spain as culturally isolated, Amador de los Ríos defended Spanish literature as a primary successor to classical Latin literature. He included Spanish American literature as an organic extension of the Spanish tradition. Furthermore, in his groundbreaking three-volume work Historia social, política y religiosa de los judíos de España y Portugal (1875–1876), he integrated Sephardic Jewish literature into the national canon, arguing that it "bloomed" on Iberian soil. However, unlike liberal contemporaries such as Adolf de Castro, he did not explicitly condemn the Spanish Inquisition.
