= Cantón El Sunza =

- Canton
- Location in El Salvador
- Coordinates: 13°44′N 89°32′W
- Country: El Salvador
- Department: Sonsonate
- District: Izalco

Area
  - Total: 0.50 sq mi (1.3 km^{2})
  - Land: 0.50 sq mi (1.3 km^{2})
  - Water: 0 sq mi (0 km^{2})
- Elevation: 69 ft (21 m)

Population (2020)
  - Total: 392
  - Density: 780/sq mi (300/km^{2})
- Time zone: UTC-6 (Central Standard Time)

Cantón El Sunza is a village located in the Sonsonate Department of El Salvador. It is a small community which is located approximately 50 kilometres from the centre of the capital city, San Salvador.

== History ==
The village was settled around the same time as the rest of the Sonsonate Department, with the earliest settlements dating back to the indigenous people who lived in the area. Based on archaeological evidence in the area, it is estimated that it was first inhabited between 400 and 700BC.

== Culture ==
The village is located within 4 miles of the mounds of San Isidro, an archaeological site which dates back to the Preclassic period. This site features over 50 mounds which show the presence of a fairly complex civilization within the area. A small amount of tourism has begun to arrive into Cantón El Sunza due to these remains. Based on the jade objects and figurines recovered in the area, it is likely that it was a place of cultural exchange and served as a regional centre of the western fringe of Central America.

== Economy ==
It is a small rural community based around agriculture, with the most popular grown crops being maize and beans. The village also has a local agricultural cooperative called the Asociación Cooperativa de Producción Agropecuaria El Sunza de R.L., which works with the farmers. While other sectors are beginning to grow within Cantón El Sunza, the village is still predominantly based around the farming industry.

== Infrastructure ==
There are several facilities which have been built for the local population of Cantón El Sunza. There is 1 school in the area called the Complejo Educativo Cantón El Sunza, and there are several churches in the area, accommodating for the Christian majority within the area. There are also several businesses in the area, such as an ice cream shop, a Mexican restaurant and a store.

== International diplomacy ==
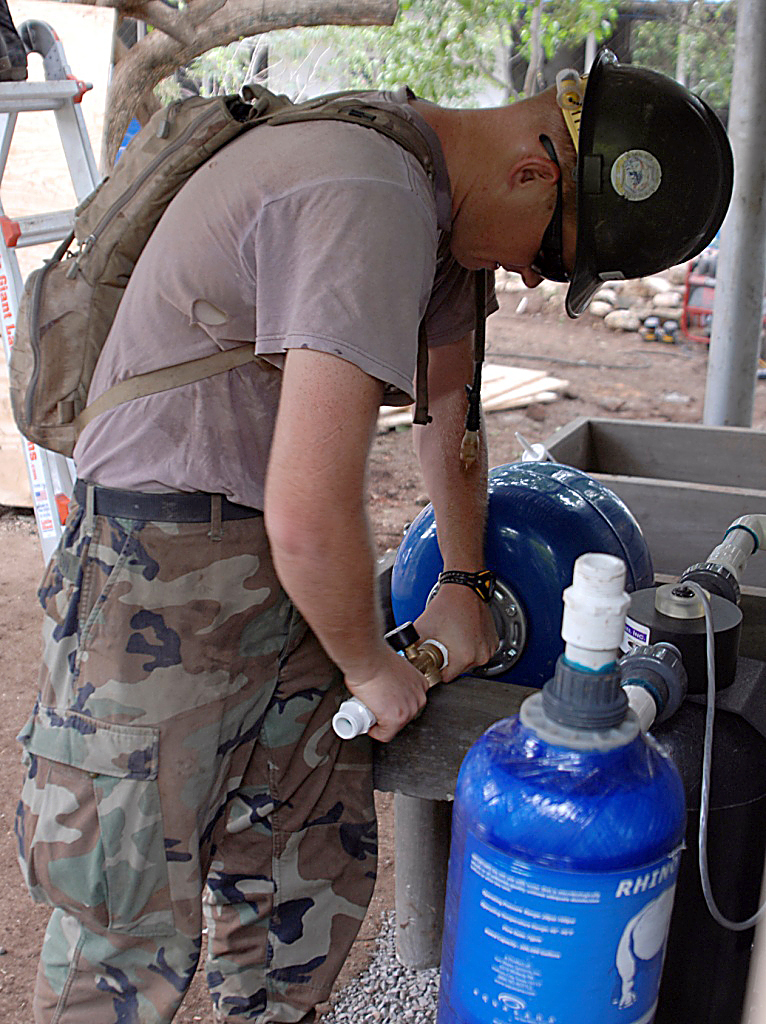
Aid being given to people in Cantón El Sunza

Cantón El Sunza does have some international importance, being part of the Continuing Promise 2008 scheme which was carried out by the US Navy in El Salvador in order to help development within the area. This involved them helping many local people by improving their access to clean water and offering them free medical assistance which involved vaccinations, check-ups and minor surgeries. Veterinary care was also provided to the farm animals and pets of the villagers.
