= Medrano =

Medrano is a Spanish surname. Notable people with the surname include:

- Luisa de Medrano, The first female professor in Spain
- Gabino Gainza Fernandez de Medrano, Captain General of Chile and Guatemala, declared and headed the First Independent United States of Central America
- Carlos Monge Medrano, Peruvian physician
- Diego Medrano, Spanish poet, narrator and columnist
- Enric Casadevall Medrano, Andorran politician
- Francisco Medrano (footballer), Salvadoran football player
- Francisco Medrano (poet), Spanish poet
- Giovanni Antonio Medrano, Italian architect under the reign of King Charles III of Spain
- Héctor Medrano, Mexican football manager
- Íngrid Medrano, Salvadoran wrestler
- José Alberto Medrano, Salvadoran general
- Jose Domingo Medrano, Salvadoran doctor
- Juan de Espinosa Medrano, Peruvian author
- Orlando Montenegro Medrano, Nicaraguan president
- Pedro Medrano, Argentine statesman and lawyer
- Rosa Medrano, Dominican volleyball player
- Vivienne Medrano, American animator and voice actress
- Medrano Tamen, Cameroonian footballer

== Fictional characters ==
- General Medrano, a character in Quantum of Solace
- Lily Medrano, a character in Gaano Kadalas ang Minsan
