= Asociación de Artistas Plásticos de El Salvador =

Arts association in El Salvador

ADAPES logo

The Asociación de Artistas Plásticos de El Salvador (ADAPES) is a prominent arts association in El Salvador. ADAPES was founded in 1980 by a group of recognized Salvadoran artists. The group's fundamental objective was initially the promotion of plastic arts in El Salvador. Since then, and with the collaboration of private and public institutions, ADAPES has branched out into promoting painting, sculpture and related visual arts in El Salvador.

Notable ADAPES members include Carlos Ricardo Morales Ehrlich, Marco Valencia, Francisco Zayas, Licry Bicard, Marielos Imery, Romeo Galdamez, Mayra Barraza, Fredis Monge, Hugo Martinez, Carlos Cartagena, Salvador Llort, Mauricio Castillo, Mauricio Linares Aguilar, Evelyn Quinteros, Amber Rose, Tessie Scharaga, Dagoberto Nolasco, Ivan Bran, Armando Solis, Giovanni Gil, Victor Cartagena, Elisa Archer, Alberto Merino, Marta Eugenia Valle, Ricardo Portillo, Flor Nuila, Antonio Lara, Maria Kahn, Gilberto Arriaza
