= Juayúa =

- Municipality
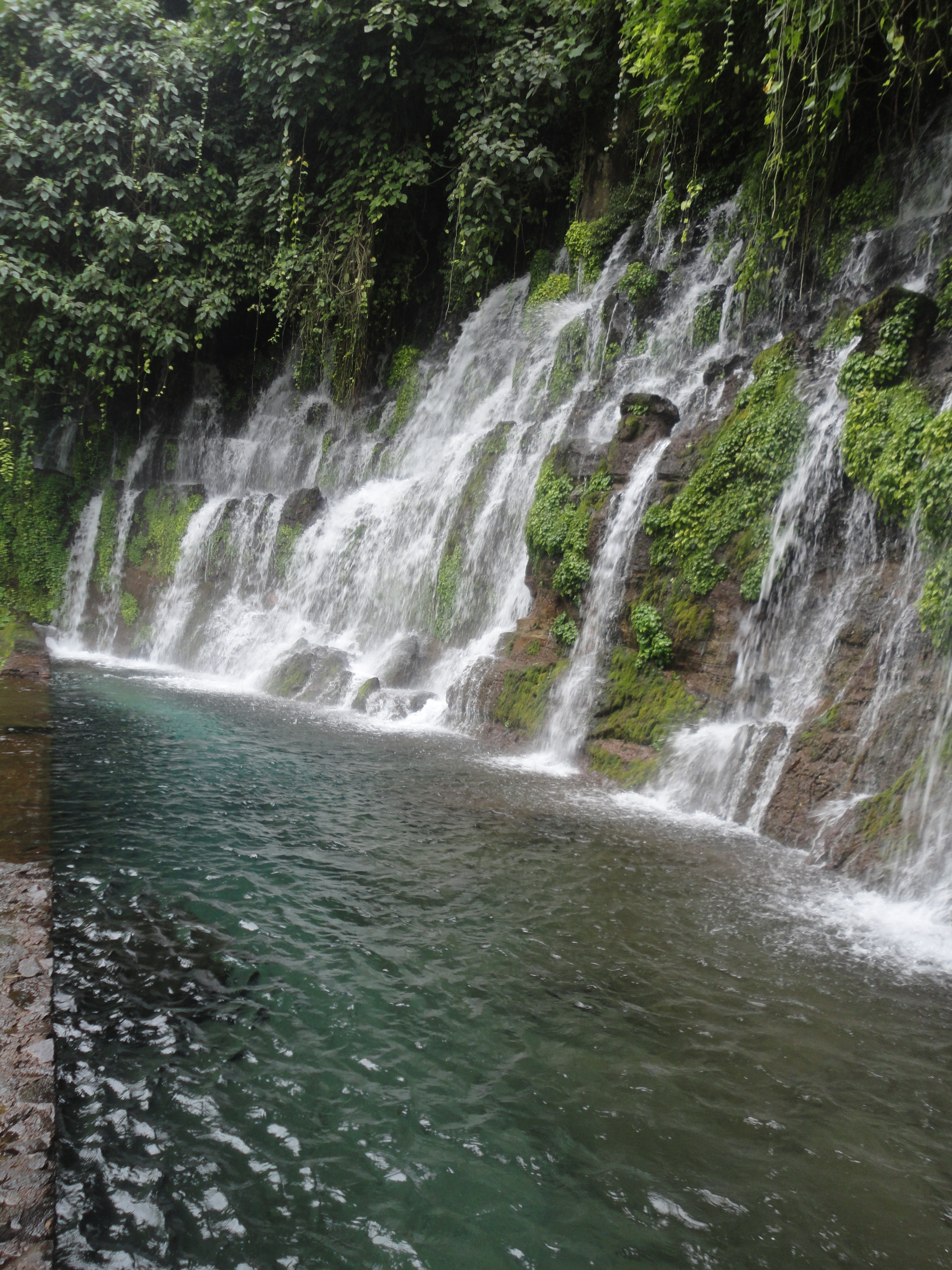

- Location in El Salvador
- Coordinates: 13°50′N 89°44′W
- Country: El Salvador
- Department: Sonsonate

Government
  - Mayor: Hugo Zavaleta (2024-2027)

Area
  - Municipality: 39.79 sq mi (103.06 km^{2})
- Elevation: 3,480 ft (1,060 m)

Population
  - Municipality: 70,959

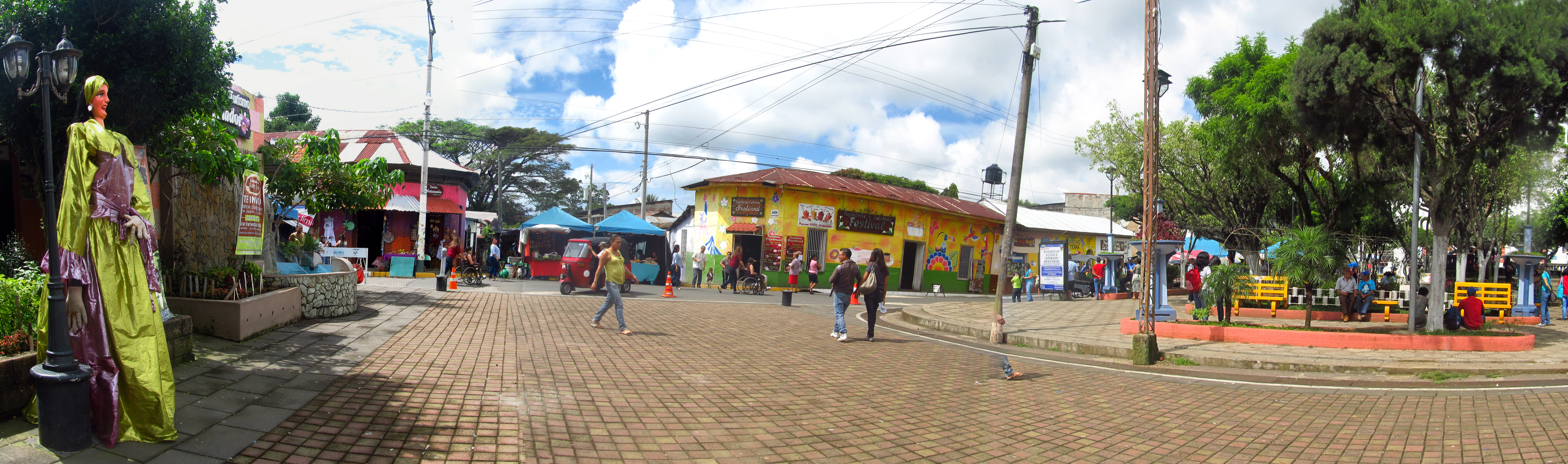
The Plaza Central

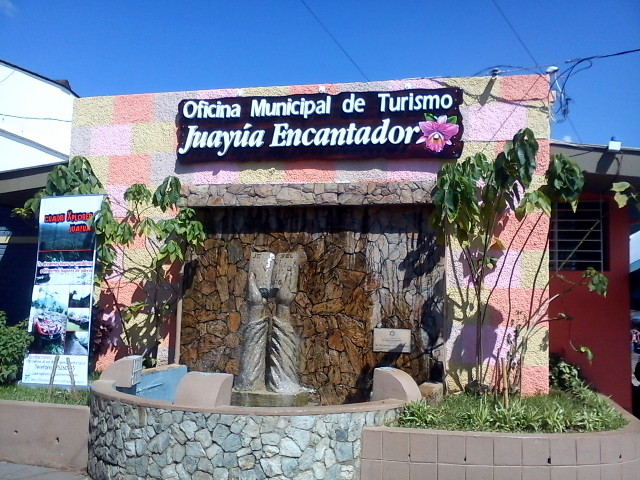
The tourist office

Juayúa is a city and municipality in the Sonsonate department of El Salvador. It is a small town up in the mountains, founded in 1577. Juayua is located in the western part of El Salvador, about 50 miles (80 kilometers) from San Salvador.

== History ==
Juayúa is a Pre-Columbian Pipil town. By the year 1550, its population was estimated at about 300 inhabitants; by 1577, it was a catechizing town for the Franciscans priests living in Sonsonate.

Towards the end of the 16th century, the religious planted an image similar to the Black Christ of Esquipulas, and it was there that they erected the first hermitage of what would become the Church of Santa Lucía.

== The Santa Lucia Church ==
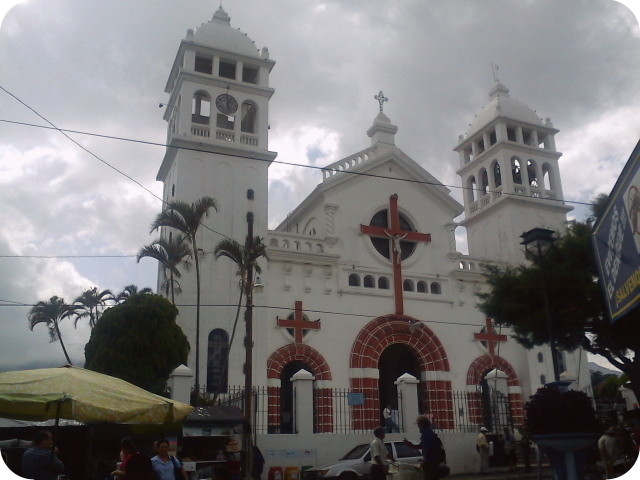
The Iglesia de Santa Lucía en Honor al Cristo Negro

The town's central plaza faces the iconic Santa Lucia church that features a statue of black Christ; this is a sister statue to that of the revered Basilica of Esquipulas in Guatemala. The statue was carved by Quirio Cantaño in the late 16th century.

Over its existence, the church has had three different buildings. The first was built with Colonial Adobe and was destroyed by an earthquake. The second was built with wood in a neoclassical style, and it was destroyed by a fire. The third church was built on the same location as the first, and second, construction was completed in 1957.

== Tourism ==
The town has become a tourist attraction locally and internationally due to its scenic views, events, and for being part of the La Ruta de Las Flores tourist route.

=== The Food Festival ===
The Juayua food festival (Feria Gastronomica) (7) attracts hundreds of national and international tourists; it is held outdoors in the Juayúa central square. Local restaurants offer traditional dishes, including chicken soup, pupusas, yuca with pork, tamales, and seafood.

=== Los Chorros de la Calera waterfall ===
The Los Chorros de La Calera waterfall is a popular tourist attraction, it is located outside the city. It is a popular hike that takes you through coffee farms.

=== Colonial architecture and murals ===
Juayúa has well preserved colonial architecture and art displays in its streets. The walls of the city's cafés, restaurants, and shops are covered with murals painted by local artists. These range from surrealist works to realistic portraits. One of Juayúa's most well-known works is La Ruta de Flores ("the route of flowers"). This is a route wherein many walls, posts, and signs lining the streets are painted with murals, mostly of flowers.

=== Other tourism ===
The city has activities on the weekends, and there is a coffee museum nearby. The surrounding area of Juayua contains several coffee farms, including the Larin finca farm.

== Culture ==
The patron saint festivities of the City of Juayúa in Honor of the Black Christ are from January 1 to the 15th. During this time, just like in Esquipulas, many people of faith visit to give thanks for the blessings received during the previous year.

== See also ==
- Feliciano Ama
- 1932 Salvadoran peasant massacre
