= Giovanni Gil =

Visual artist and engraver (born 1971)

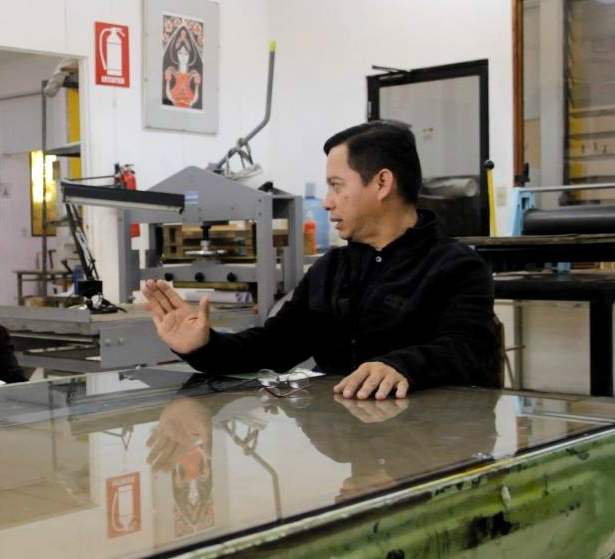
- Gil in 2017
- Born: Hector Giovanni Gil Portillo; December 19, 1971 (age 54); San Salvador, El Salvador
- Education: Centro Nacional de Artes, Universidad Luterana Salvadoreña
- Known for: Engraving
- Notable work: Soñar al Revés, Bajo Presión
- Website: giovannigil.com

Hector Giovanni Gil Portillo (born 19 December 1971) is a plastic artist from El Salvador specializing in engraving.

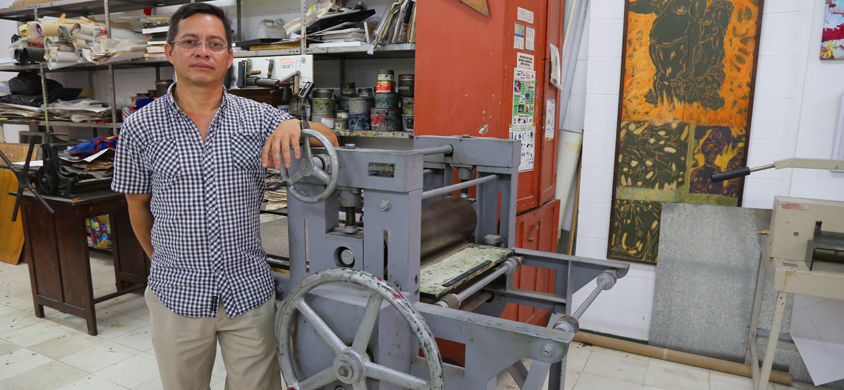
Giovanni Gil, in his engraving workshop.

== Early life and education ==
Giovanni Gil was born on 19 December 1971 in San Salvador, the capital of El Salvador, to Marina Portillo and Luis Felipe Gil. He has two brothers.

Between 1991 and 1993, he studied theater, music, dance, and visual arts at the Centro Nacional de Artes (CENAR). After completing his graduation, he worked at CENAR as a professor. He later pursued a degree in education administration at Universidad Luterana Salvadoreña.

Gil travelled to Japan in 1997, visiting art schools, galleries and museums to learn more about engraving and print techniques. He became interested in engraving after Salvadorian painter Carlos Cañas, then director of CENAR, encouraged him to explore the art form. In 2001, he spent time in Cuba, studying Cuban art techniques.

== Soñar al Revés [Dreaming Backwards] ==
The artist Giovanni Gil creates social initiative Soñar al Revés in 2003 in order to raise awareness, inform and bring the Salvadoran population closer with engraving, the arts in general and also to change the vision of Salvadorans to dream upside down with their reality, in other words that they aspire to make a change in their reality by taking the first step, which is according to the artist, dreaming. Its name is born of the technique of the engraving where everything that is drawn must be think the opposite way so that the impression is to the right. This initiative has exhibitions such as:

Exhibition	Year	Country
“Carlos Cañas y El Grabado”	2003	El Salvador
“Rostros”	2003	El Salvador
“Contactos”	2006	El Salvador
“El Grabado como Pretexto”	2007	El Salvador
“El Original Múltiple”	2008	El Salvador
“El Grabado como Pretexto" Segunda Edición	2010	El Salvador

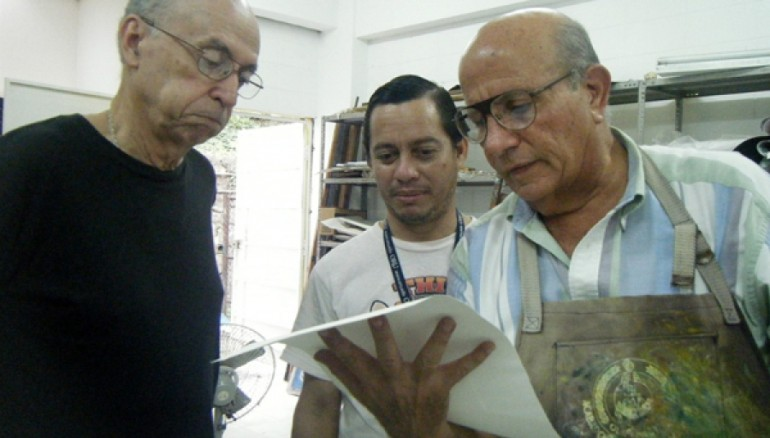
Giovanni Gil teaching engraving together with Carlos Ruiz and Salvador Llort

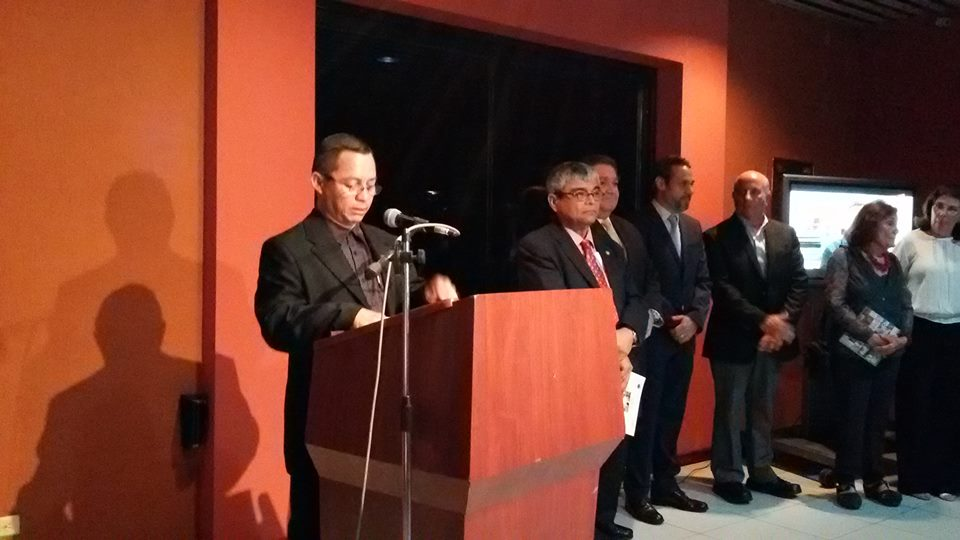
Giovanni Gil in the inaugural speech of Bajo Presión, Soñar al Revés.

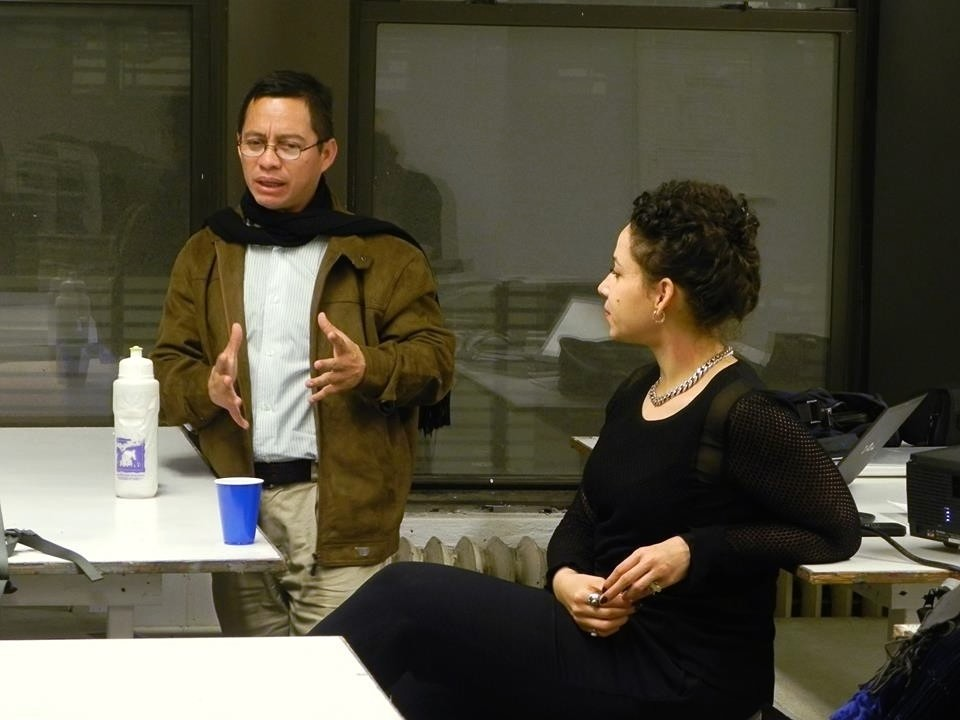
Giovanni Gil giving a conference in Manhattan Graphics Center, Nueva York

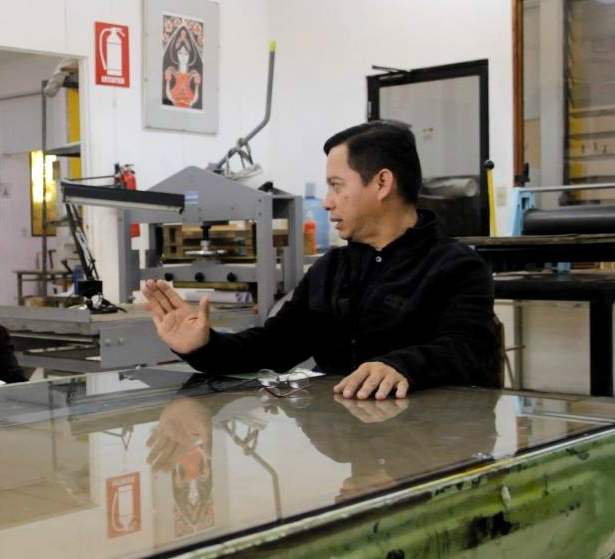
Giovanni Gil in an interview for Arte y Fe Network

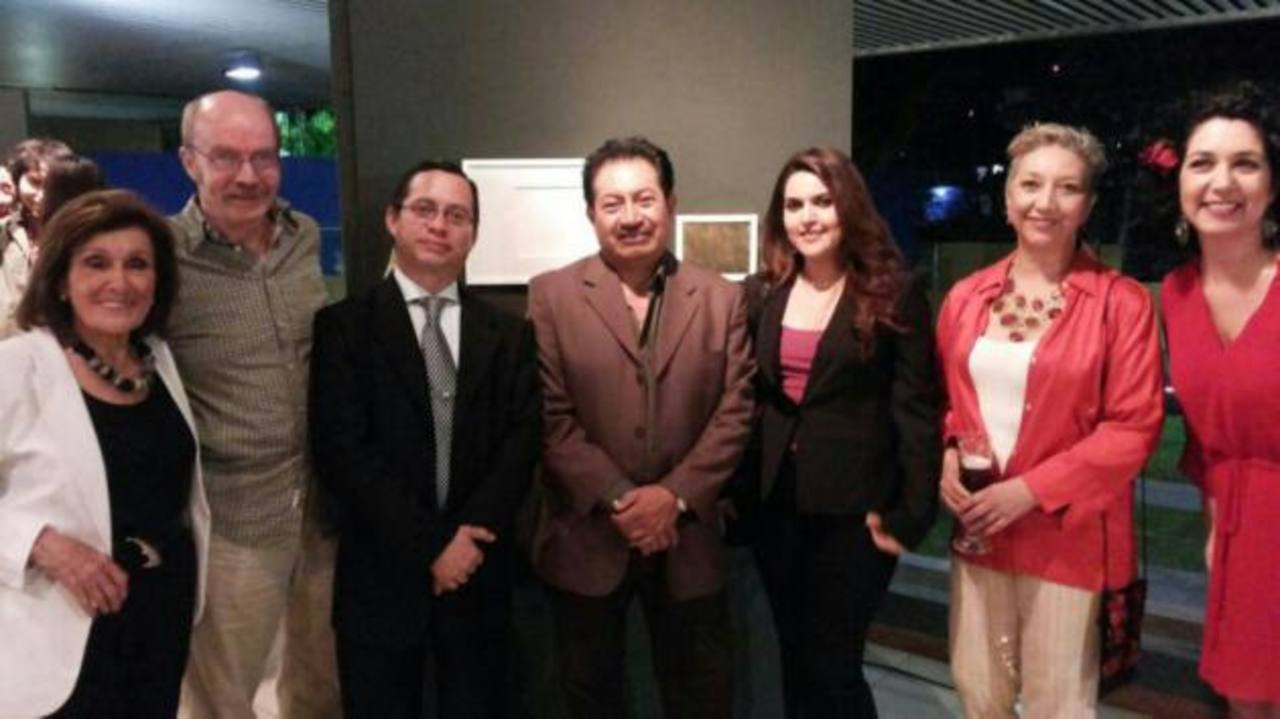
Giovanni Gil with participants and friends of Bajo Presión.

=== Bajo Presión [Under Pressure] ===
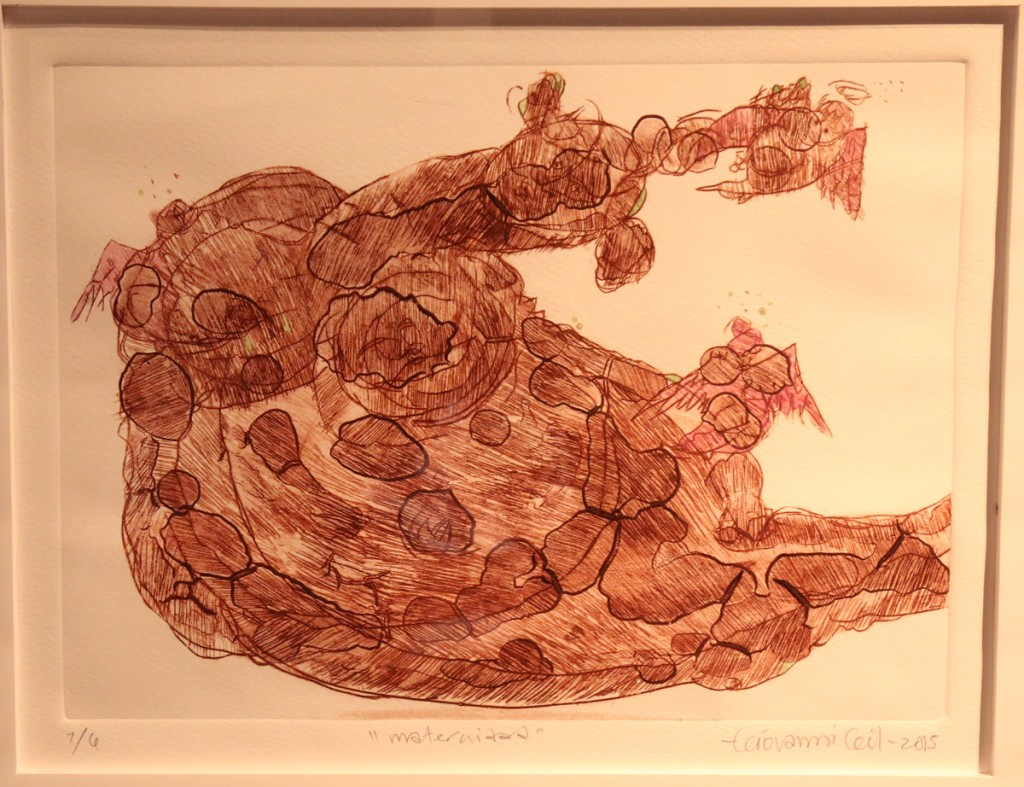
Engraving of Giovanni Gil, exhibition Bajo Presión 2016

“The project aims to generate a participation among established, emerging and initiated (students) artists in the practice of engraving, with the purpose of transferring knowledge” - Giovanni Gil.

This is how Giovanni Gil defines the project of which he is founder and director. Bajo Presión [Under Pressure] was born with a primary objective, which is to join the guild of artists in El Salvador, And not only to seek unity among them, but to retake the technique that was and has been practiced by great exhibitors of plastic art in history. Its name comes from the process of creating an engraving where pressure is exerted on two surfaces and an image is obtained, however it is also born, as described by one of the participants Juan Glower, by the group pressure that is generated where the opinions of all counts and one has to strip himself of his individuality to form part of a whole; among the techniques that this artist has encouraged to learn or develop in greater depth are Etching, Aquatint and Drypoint.

“[...] The democratization of the visual arts is sought, both in visual consumption and material” - Giovanni Gil.

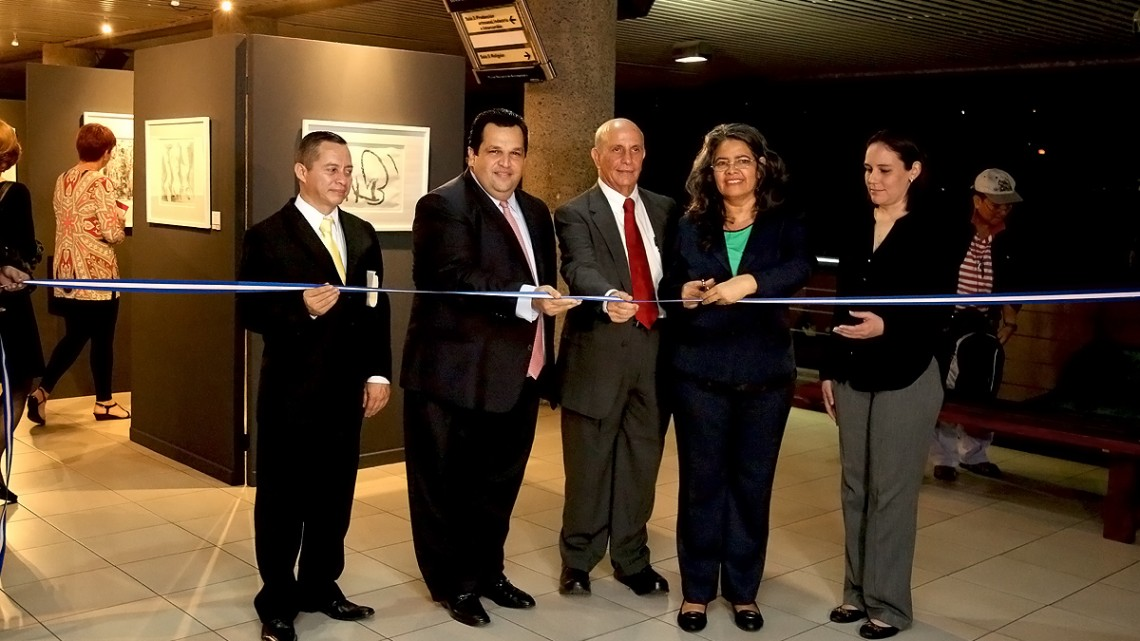
Giovanni Gil, opening Bajo Presión 2016 at National Museum of Anthropology (MUNA)

This particular project brought together, in its first edition in 2013, 22 Salvadoran artists and students of engraving and was dedicated to the person who inspired Giovanni to undertake the arts, Carlos Cañas.

Bajo Presión 2014, reunited 32 artists and students, this is when the Secretary of Culture appointed the month of February 2014 as the Engraving month in El Salvador. In Bajo Presión 2015, 36 artists met, among them students, as on previous occasions, in order to support talented young Salvadorans to forge their careers in art.

In 2016, the activity is carried out for the fourth consecutive year and the number of participants grows, being 44 artists and students, the technique that was worked on that occasion was Chalcography and Drypoint and the engravings were mostly illuminated. At the same time Silvia Elena Regalado, Secretary of Culture, re-denominates February as Engraving month in the context of the inauguration of Bajo Presión 2016 . Another important aspect that all the editions of Bajo Presión have is that the collection of engravings after its official presentation travel and are exhibited throughout El Salvador to bring art to the public.

== Awards and recognition ==
- 2001, Honorific mention in the Primera Bienal de Arte Paiz
- 2002, Honorific mention in Arte Joven of Centro Cultural de España
- 2003, Public Recognition of Intellectual Property in the Discipline of Visual Arts: Engraving and Painting, by the National Center of Records (CNR)
- 2008, Silver medal, Salon of Contemporary Art El Salvador-Japan
- 2010, Honorific mention, Art Museum MARTE

== Artwork ==
"Giovanni Gil Is an excellent engraver worker in his various manifestations. His work provides us a link with his creativity, so that we are able to attend, visit and penetrate the grace of the line as depositary of the form. It expresses so sharply the strength and the delicacy. All of his product is therefore part of his sensitivity. To see his engraving, it is therefore to see his creativity."

This is how Carlos Cañas described the line, style and work of Giovanni, who although his specialty is engraving also develops other areas of the visual arts and his style is more focused with contemporary art. Has performed more than 80 individual and collective exhibitions And his work is found in different private collections in countries such as Japan, Denmark, Colombia, the United States, Chile, Brazil, Guatemala, Cuba, Puerto Rico, Spain, France, Tunisia, El Salvador, Canada, South Africa, Portugal, among others.

In addition to the plastic art, Gil has written a manifesto called "Maldita Herencia" in which it explains a little of the art history, engraving and support to artists in El Salvador. He has also served as reference in other publications as ''Procesos de Arte en El Salvador". And belongs to the Asociación de Artistas Plásticos de El Salvador.
