= René Núñez Suárez =

Salvadorean engineer

- Born: 1945-46; San Salvador
- Education: University of El Salvador; University of Salford
- Occupation: Engineer

René Núñez Suárez (born 1945–46) is a Salvadoran engineer who created the "turbococina" (turbo-cooker), a type of kitchen with low energy consumption that aims to reduce fuelwood consumption by around 95%.

== Invention ==
In the mid-1990s, Francisco Serrano persuaded Núñez to write a chapter about El Salvador's energy resources in the Baccalaureate book Historia natural y ecología de El Salvador (Natural History and Ecology of El Salvador). When he finished writing the chapter, Núñez realized that "firewood was the most important energy resource in the country". After doing several investigations, Núñez concluded no one had treated the problem of firewood consumption, and incorporated his findings to create an appliance that was simple, economic, and minimized the consumption of firewood. He completed it in 1997 and called it the turbococina.

The turbococina consists of a stainless steel cylinder that has ten air injectors, two electric fans, and a steel plate that regulates the inlet and outlet of air. It has a pressurized combustion system where the heat produced is administered to a single point to minimize the use of firewood in the country by 95%. Its development cost around one million dollars.

== Recognition ==
Núñez obtained international recognition for his invention and was invited to the United Nations Climate Change Convention for the presentation of his turbococina.

In 1999, he was awarded by the National Registration Center in the 1st National Inventors Contest for the invention of the turbococina.

In 2002, Núñez was awarded in New Delhi with the Leadership in Climate Technology 2002 award, granted by the Climate Technology Initiative during the United Nations Framework Convention on Climate Change. On November 7, he was recognized by the Legislative Assembly of El Salvador as "Most Deserving Son of El Salvador" for "his outstanding scientific and investigative career, developing turbo combustion or low-temperature combustion, which is considered a significant discovery for the benefit of humanity".

In November 2011, Núñez was one of nine finalists for the Launch 2011 Energy Innovators, organized by USAID, the United States Department of State, and NASA.

== Awards and nominations ==
- 1999: Prize awarded by the National Registry Center of El Salvador.
- 2002: Leadership in Climate Technology 2002 Award, awarded by the United Nations.
- 2002: "Most Deserving Son of El Salvador" Distinction, awarded by the Legislative Assembly of El Salvador.
- 2008: Innovatium Praemium Award, from the PROInnova program, from FUSADES.
- 2011: He was nominated in the Launch 2011 Energy Innovators, organized by USAID, the United States Department of State and NASA.
