= Morena Herrera =

Salvadoran feminist and social activist who advocates for legal and safe abortions

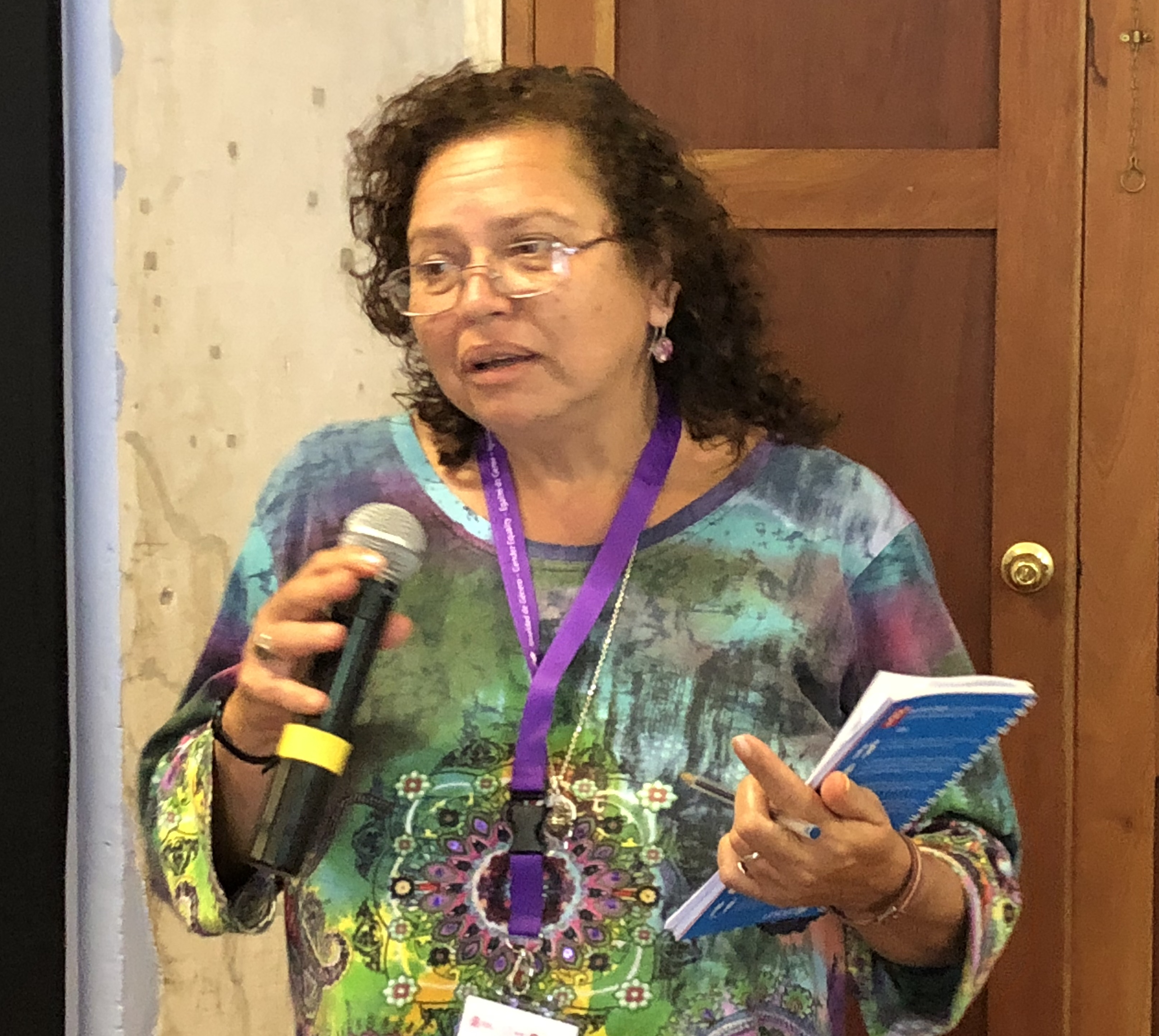
Morena Herrera (2018).

Morena Herrera (born 1959 or 1960 (age 64–65)) is a Salvadoran feminist and social activist, noted for her work against her country's ban on abortion. During the Salvadoran Civil War, which ended in 1992, Herrera served as a left-wing freedom fighter for the Farabundo Marti National Liberation Front (FMLN) against the United States-supported government. She has been particularly active in advocacy for safe and legal abortion access since it was abolished in 1997, and in 2009 began working with the Citizen's Group for the Decriminalization of Abortion, which she now heads. Herrera was named one of the BBC 100 Women in 2016 for her contributions to women's rights in El Salvador.

== Biography ==
Active in campaigning for social change from a young age, during the Salvadoran Civil War, which ended in 1992, Herrera served as a left-wing freedom fighter. She fought for over ten years with the Farabundo Marti National Liberation Front (FMLN) against the United States-supported government.

Herrera was outspoken on the Peace Accords, signed in 1992, which she saw as deeply problematic for women's rights in El Salvador. She has said of them: "Those accords left big holes when it came to women’s rights. I realized I had to fight another way. Women’s rights are human rights and they have to be a priority." The situation for women and abortion has worsened since 1997, when changes in the penal code made abortion completely illegal, when it had previously been acceptable in severe cases where a woman's life was at risk or she had been raped. Due to the country being strictly Catholic, abortion is considered unacceptable, even for pregnant teenage girls who face many problems.

Since the ban on abortion in El Salvador was passed in 1998, over 600 women accused of having an abortion have been sent to jail for up to forty years. The worst part of this unfortunate circumstance is that in most of these cases, the women had a miscarriage. Now they must deal with the sorrow of losing their child while being jailed for a "crime" they did not commit. Las 17 is a group of jailed women whose freedom Herrera and her colleagues have fought for. Although a few these women have been freed, despite all the efforts by Herrera and her colleagues, many more women have been convicted and sent to jail for the same crime. Herrera says that the government does not recognize women's reproductive rights, despite the risks a pregnancy places on the mother. Currently, a third of pregnancies in El Salvador come from teenage mothers, which could be partly due to young women being raped by the gangs that are prominent near San Salvador, the nation's capital. These young women are more subject to having pregnancy complications since they are still growing and maturing themselves. Political figures do not want to discard the ban on abortion because they fear the church and certain organizations such as the Yes to Life Foundation will not reelect them to office. The idea of "a woman's sole purpose is to be a mother and take care of the house" is a main one for the church and society of El Salvador, leading to the lack of support for a woman to be in control of her body. To make matters worse, contraception is very hard to obtain for most women and if they do obtain it, it usually does not work properly. Herrera hopes to have make change in the legal rights for women while Salvador Sanchez Céren is still president (until 2019), but while his job and life are on the line facing the gangs and society, the changes towards women's rights has been an incredibly slow process. Despite the plethora of obstacles Herrera still has to overcome and the frequent threats on her life and the life of her family members, she continues to work towards a better, consented life for all women in El Salvador.

Since 2009, Herrera has worked with the Citizen's Group for the Decriminalization of Abortion, which she now heads. In 2013 she was outspoken when the Supreme Court of El Salvador denied an abortion to a terminally ill woman, who stood no chance of surviving the birth, calling them "irresponsible". Her work was subject to a report by Amnesty International in January 2015, and in 2016 she was named one of the BBC 100 Women.
