= María Teresa Rivera =

Woman's human rights defender

Maria Teresa Rivera is a woman human rights defender, working an abortion rights, from El Salvador. She was sentenced to 40 years in prison for aggravated homicide in 2011 after having a miscarriage. She served 4 and a half years of her sentence before being released. In March 2017, Rivera and her 12-year-old son were given asylum by the Swedish Migration Agency in fear that a prosecutor's appeal of the decision to release her might lead to her returning to prison.

There has been a blanket ban on abortion in El Salvador since 1998. Five other Latin American countries have similar bans: Chile, Haiti, Honduras, Nicaragua and Suriname.

She is now advocating for Sexual Reproductive Rights (SRR Rights) in EI Salvador while in Sweden, with Amnesty Sweden and others.

== Early life ==
Rivera is from a small village called La Libertad. During the Civil War, her mother vanished; Rivera was 8 years old at the time. At the age of 8, Rivera was attacked and raped by a stranger while walking at night. After this incident, she and her brother went to live in an orphanage near the capital. She completed high school education and worked in factories and retail jobs. In May 2005, she had a baby boy. The relationship between Rivera and the baby's father broke down due to domestic violence. Rivera and her ex-mother-in-law maintained a strong relationship and brought up Rivera's son together.

== Court case ==
The judge in Rivera's case noted two pieces of evidence before giving a guilty verdict. Rivera's factory boss gave a testimony of how Rivera had confided in him in January 2011 suspecting she was pregnant. The judge concluded that Rivera was, therefore, aware of her pregnancy. The baby's autopsy report stated that the baby had been full term and died of prenatal asphyxiation. The judge inferred that the cause of asphyxiation was intentional smothering. He sentenced Rivera to 40 years imprisonment. Rivera disputed the judge's decision, saying had she known about the pregnancy she would have done everything possible to protect the baby.

== Prison ==
While in the overcrowded prison Rivera was often called "baby killer". She did small jobs in the prison such as cleaning toilets and collecting rubbish to earn some money. During her time in prison, she saw her son twice. The Salvadoran Citizens’ Group for the Decriminalisation of Abortion (CFDA) mounted a legal defence against Rivera's imprisonment but these appeals were rejected. According to Amnesty International, Rivera shared a prison cell with 250 people. On 20 May 2016, she was released from prison following a court decision to overturn her conviction.

== After prison ==
On her release, she thanked Amnesty International supporters for campaigning for her release:

"I have been sharing my experience with others – and thanking God that I am not there [in prison] anymore. I am very grateful to every man and woman who has been following my case, with that lighted candle, and who hoped that I would be free. That gave me so much strength, because if you believed it on the outside, I had to believe it too. In El Salvador justice has been served and this needs to happen again with my "compañeras". I ask everyone - men and women who followed my case – to support them. I will also join you. I don’t have the economic means, but I have the moral strength to help make them feel strong by keeping alive the hope that they will also be free, and that justice will be done."

26 women have been imprisoned for allegedly inducing miscarriages and are serving between 30 and 40-year prison sentences. Such cases, some known as the "Las 17", have received media attention in El Salvador and internationally. She was the third woman of "Las 17" to be released.

Following her release she found it difficult to get a job and was known as a "baby killer". The Attorney General said the decision to release Maria Teresa Rivera would be appealed.

Swedish authorities granted Rivera asylum on 17 March 2017. She was the first person granted asylum in Sweden based on persecution following defying an abortion ban. Rivera was given immigration housing for herself and her son by the Swedish government.
