= Carlos Cañas =

Salvadoran painter (1924–2013)

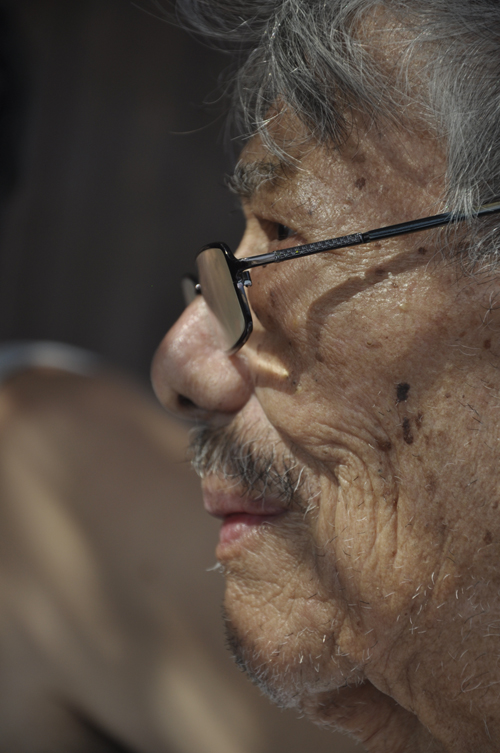
- Carlos Cañas in 2012
- Born: September 3, 1924; San Salvador, El Salvador
- Died: April 14, 2013 (aged 88); San Salvador, El Salvador
- Occupation: Painter
- Spouse: Carmen Gutierrez Cañas
- Children: 2

Carlos Cañas (September 3, 1924 – April 14, 2013) was a Salvadoran painter who studied art and theory at the School of Arts of El Salvador. In 1950, he received a scholarship to study art, history, aesthetics, and literature in Madrid at the Real Academia de Bellas Artes de San Fernando.

Cañas participated at the First Latin American Biennial, Spain (1951); in the Fourth Biennial of the Engraving, Japan (1964); in the Sutton Gallery, USA (1979), amongst other important exhibitions at the worldwide level.

In 2012, he received the national prize of culture Premio Nacional de Cultura of El Salvador.
