= Prudencia Ayala =

Salvadoran social activist (1885–1936)

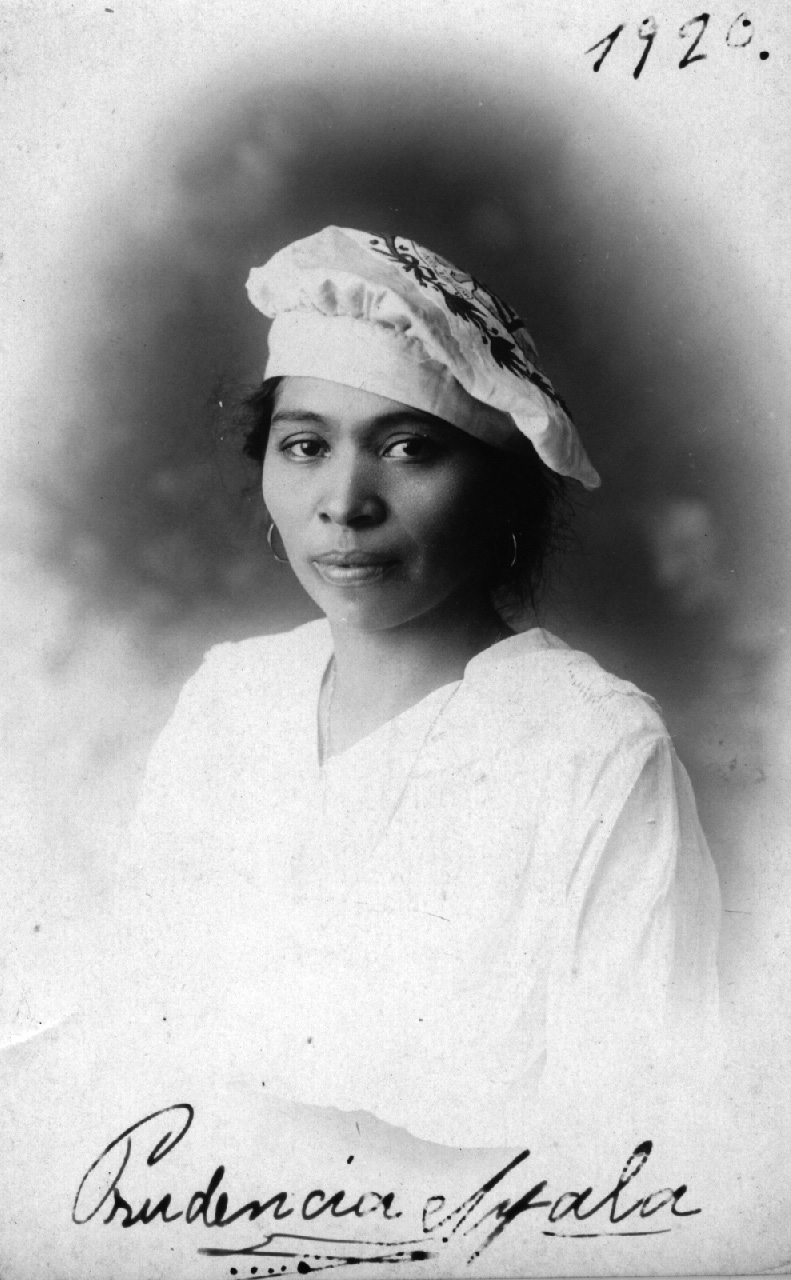
- Ayala in 1920
- Born: 28 April 1885; Sonzacate, El Salvador
- Died: 11 July 1936 (aged 51); San Salvador, El Salvador
- Occupation(s): Writer, social activist

Prudencia Ayala (28 April 1885 – 11 July 1936) was a Salvadoran writer, social activist, and pioneer campaigner for women's rights in El Salvador, as well as the first woman to run for president in El Salvador and Latin America.

== Early life ==
Prudencia Ayala was born on 28 April 1885, to a working-class Indigenous family in Sonzacate. Her parents were Aurelia Ayala and Vicente Chief. When she was ten years old, her family moved to Santa Ana City, where she attended María Luisa de Cristofine's elementary school. Despite never finishing her studies due to the lack of resources of her family, she progressed through self-teaching.

She learned to sew and worked as a seamstress along with her future activities. She assured she had the capacity of predicting the future through messages she received from "mysterious voices". This allowed her to gain some relevance among her close relatives, making her gain fame and recognition despite the unlikely truth of her predictions. This statement also provoked criticism and mockery from some social groups.

Her predictions were published in Santa Ana's newspapers, where she's referred to as "la sibila santaneca". In 1914, she predicted the fall of Germany's Kaiser and the involvement of the United States in the war. From then on, her name would take relevance because of her feminist approaches and her esoteric character.

== Social activism ==
From 1913 she began to publish opinion pieces in Diary of the West, when she traveled to the west region of El Salvador. She was active in movements of anti-imperialism, feminism, and Central American reunification. She protested the United States' invasion in Nicaragua. She also published poems in many newspapers in El Salvador.

In 1919 she was put in jail for the criticism in one of her columns, the mayor of Atiquizaya and also, in Guatemala, she was put in jail for many months for accusations of collaborating with the planning of coup of state. In 1921 she published her book Escrible. Adventures of a trip to Guatemala, in which she narrated her trip to Guatemala during the last months under the dictatorship of Manuel Estrada Cabrera. In addition she published the books Immortal, Amores de Loca (1925) y Fumada Mota (1928). During the final of the 1920s, she funded and ran the newspaper Rendencion Femenina, where she expressed her stance on the fight of women's rights.

== Participation in politics ==
In 1930, she intended to run as a candidate for the presidency of the Republic, even though the Salvadoran legislation did not recognize women's right to vote. Her government platform included the support of unions, honesty, and transparency of the public administration, the limitation of the distribution and consumption of liquor, the respect of the freedom of worship and the recognition of "illegitimate kids". She started a public debate of legal and political arguments in favor and against her ambition. One of the advocates of her candidacy was the philosopher, teacher, writer, and congressman Alberto Masferrer, who, in the Newspaper Patria, stated:

Prudencia Ayala defends a just and noble cause, which is the women's right to vote and to hold high positions. Her government program is not inferior in justification, practical sense and simplicity, than other candidates that are taken seriously.

Finally, her application was rejected by the Supreme Court, but the debate that followed the intent of her nomination sparked the feminist movement that permitted the women suffrage right to be reconsidered in 1939, and that in the Constitution of 1950, under the approval of the President Óscar Osorio, it gave legal recognition of women's rights in El Salvador.

== Death and legacy ==
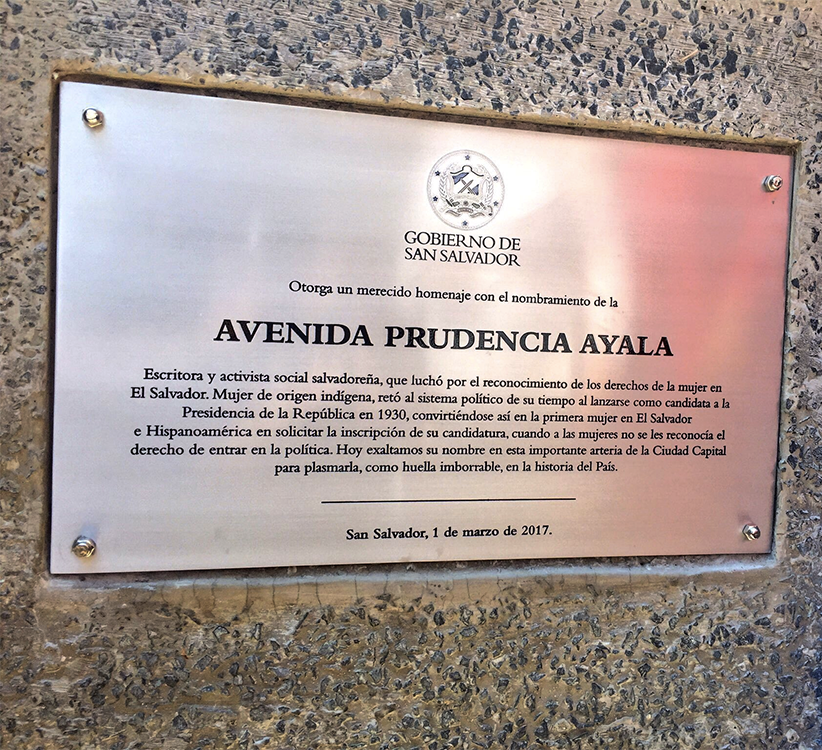
Plaque commemorating the naming of Avenue Prudencia Ayala in March 2017, San Salvador.

Prudencia Ayala died on 11 July 1936, away from the political arena, but close to the masses and social movements. There is no proof of her participation of the worker's uprising in 1932, but it is believed that she collaborated with the uprisings. In March 2009, to celebrate Women's Day, and in tribute to Prudencia Ayala, the play Prudencia en tiempos de brujería was staged.

In March 2017, Avenue 10 South in the San Jacinto neighborhood of San Salvador was named Avenida Prudencia Ayala, one of only two streets in the Salvadoran capital named after a woman. A plaque commemorating the name change notes:

Prudencia Ayala, Salvadoran of Indigenous blood, precursor of the fight for women's human rights.
