= Sonzacate =

Coordinates: 13°44′08″N 89°42′58″W

Sonzacate is a district in the Sonsonate department of El Salvador.
