= Adolfo de Castro =

Spanish historian

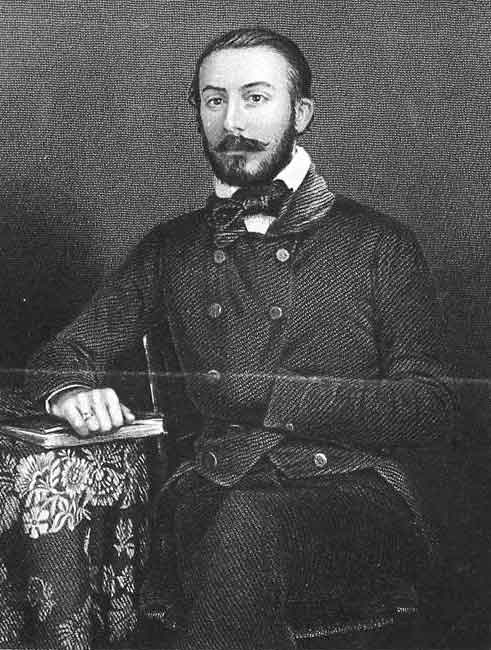
Adolfo de Castro

Adolfo de Castro (died October 1898 in Cádiz, Spain) was a Spanish historian and member of the Real Academia de la Historia of Madrid. He lived in Cadiz and died there in 1898.

== Biography ==
Castro wrote the first short history of the Jews in Spain, based on careful studies. His history was so impartial and dispassionate that he found it necessary to assure his readers (p. 8): "Escribo esta historia sin pasion, ni artificio, como de cosas que nada me tocan. Ni soi judio, ni vengo de judaizantes" (I write this history dispassionately and without craft, as concerning things that do not touch me. I am not a Jew, nor am I of Jewish descent.) Castro's book was published under the title Historia de los Judios en España, desde los Tiempos de su Establecimiento hasta Principios del Presente Siglo, Cádiz, 1847. It was translated into English by Rev. Edward D.G.M. Kirwan, Cambridge, John Deighton, 1851.

Unlike José Amador de los Ríos, who after him treated the history of the Jews in Spain, Castro condemned the Inquisition: "Pues los monarcas bien podran regir con las leyes de la fuerza los cuerpos de sus vasallos; pero no podrán sujetar los animos" (For monarchs can indeed command by forcible laws the bodies of their subjects, but cannot subdue their souls).

== Selected works ==
- Historia de Cádiz (1845)
- Historia de Xerez de la Frontera (1845)
- Historia de los judíos en España (1847)
- El Buscapié (1848)
- Historia de los protestantes españoles y de su persecución por Felipe II (1851)
- Poetas líricos de los siglos XVI y XVII (editor, 1854–1857)
- Historia de Cádiz y su provincia (1858)
- Cádiz en la Guerra de la Independencia (1864)
- Varias obras inéditas de Cervantes (1874)
- Estudios prácticos de buen decir y de arcanidades del habla española (1879)
- Curiosidades lingüísticas (1891)
- Libro de los galicismos (1898)
