= Baena =

Baena may refer to:

- Baena (surname), list of people with the surname
- Baena, Spain, town in southern Spain
- Baena (turtle), an extinct genus of turtles
- Baenã language, an extinct language of Brazil
- Cancionero de Baena, a medieval song-book
