= Jose Domingo Medrano =

Salvadoran doctor

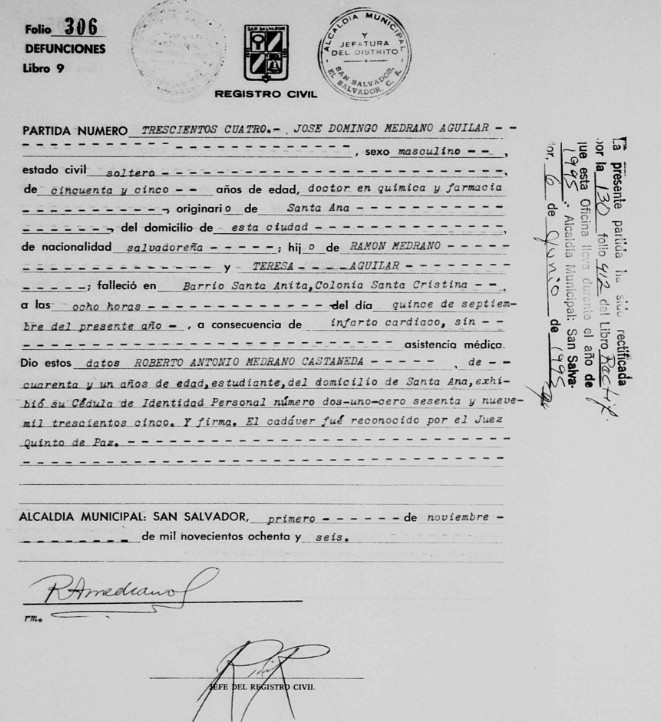

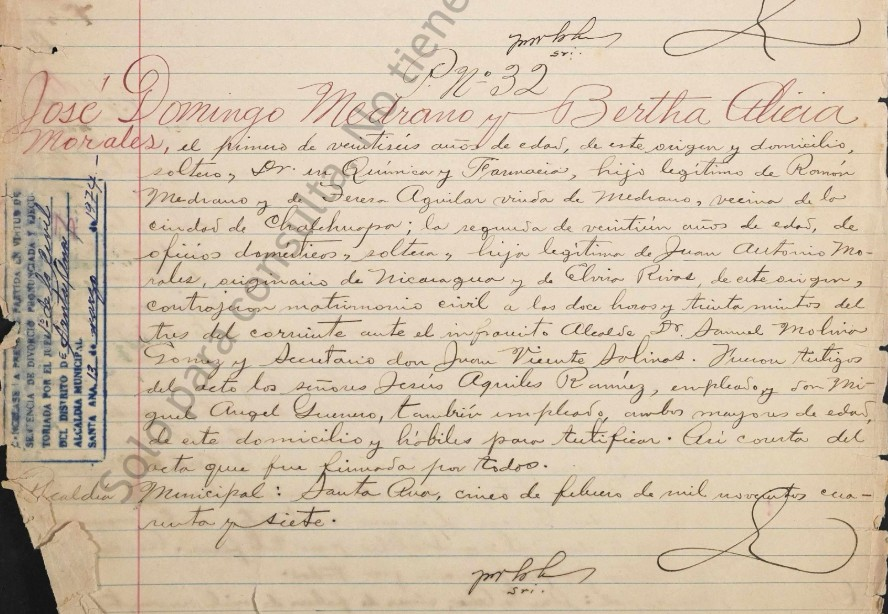

Jose Domingo Medrano (born 4 August 1920) graduated from the National University in San Salvador and was a famous doctor in El Salvador from 1961-1986. He was a member of the Salvadorean Drug Administration and patented over 10 medical products. After an accident which burned most of his body, he left his fortune to the San Miguel and Rosales Hospital Burn Centers.

== See also ==
- Julio Adalberto Rivera Carballo
