= Ballet Folklórico Oro Lenca =

Ballet Folklórico de Honduras Oro Lenca
- Formation: December 12, 2008; 17 years ago
- Founder: Johann Serén Castillo
- Type: Non-profit organization
- Purpose: Involve youth in the challenging task of rescuing cultural values through dance, theater and folk music.
- Headquarters: Casa de La Cultura "Ing. Dagoberto Napoleón Sorto Cisneros"
- Location: La Esperanza, Intibucá, Honduras
- Coordinates: 14.3086952°N 88.1818137°W
- Official language: Spanish
- General Director: Johann Serén Castillo
- Affiliations: Marca País Honduras, Más Música Más Esperanza
- Website: Orolenca.com
- Formerly called: Ballet Folklórico Oro Lenca

Ballet Folklórico de Honduras Oro Lenca is a Honduran folkloric ballet troupe in La Esperanza. It was founded in 2008 and presents dances and costumes that reflect the traditional culture of Honduras. This dance troupe hosts an annual folk dance festival, El Grande de Grandes, and represents Honduran culture internationally. It also mentors nascent dance groups in villages, towns, and cities of Honduras. In November 2015, the National Congress of Honduras designated Ballet Folklórico Oro Lenca Patrimonio Cultural de la Nación (cultural heritage of the nation), and subsequently designated Ambassadors of Art and Culture by executive decree.

The original name of the group was Ballet Folklórico Oro Lenca. In 2016, the group was registered in Honduras as a non-profit organization under its current name of Ballet Folklórico de Honduras Oro Lenca. In the name, Oro Lenca (Lenca Gold) references the indigenous Lenca people that enrich the culture of Intibucá. The dance group's performances, relating to Honduran and indigenous dance and culture, are meant to resurrect and sustain the historical indigenous, creole and colonial traditions of the region. Ballet Folklórico refers to traditional dance in Honduras that began its resurgence in the 1950s, initiated by the work of Honduran folklorist and native son of La Esperanza, Rafael Manzanares Aguilar.

== History ==
Ballet Folklórico Oro Lenca was founded on December 18, 2008, in La Esperanza under the direction of Professor Johann Serén Castillo. The group initially consisted of 10 couples, and performed for the first time on May 1, 2009, in the House of Culture of La Esperanza. The group made its national debut on 21 June of the same year in the Feria Juniana, in the industrial capital of San Pedro Sula. The group continued to mature artistically, and in 2011 it won the Grand Prize in The Gran Pereke, which at that time was the largest dance festival in Honduras. In August 2013 the group obtained first place in Proyección Folklórico Jade 2013 in the National Theater Manuel Bonilla. By 2013 when it finished its first five years, Ballet Folklórico Oro Lenca had performed over 90 distinct dances in more than 500 performances.

On October 29, 2011, members of Oro Lenca staged a new national folk festival, El Grande de Grandes. This annual festival has grown to become the preeminent folk dance festival in Honduras attracting dance groups from all regions of Honduras. Participation has increased each year so that the festival has become an influential event in the national fabric of dance in Honduras. In 2013 La Esperanza was declared The Capital of Creole Folklore by executive decree of the Secretariat for Culture, Arts and Sports in tribute to Rafael Manzanares, officially commemorated with designation of the festival El Grande de Grandes to occur annually on the last Saturday of July. During the 2014 edition of the festival, 35 dance groups composed of 600 dancers performed, and in the 2015 edition, 50 dance groups encompassing nearly 1,500 dancers performed.

In September 2012, Ballet Folklórico Oro Lenca began representing the country abroad, with their first annual tour for Honduran and Central American Independence Day events in Washington, D.C. In the 2012 tour they performed at the Independence Day festival organized by the Honduran Embassy. They also performed at the Organization of American States (OAS), at the World Bank headquarters, and in cultural festivals in Virginia, the District of Columbia, and Maryland. They have continued these tours in succeeding years. In November 2014, a delegation of dancers went to Chile to participate in the international festival Puerto de San Antonio. In June 2015, a dance delegation performed a repertoire of 50 dances recognized by the National Office of Folklore along with their own choreographies in Mexico City, Temascalcingo, Atizapan de Zaragoza, Tultitlan, and Orizba, and Saltillo, and represented Honduras in the Festival Mundial Tierra del Sol and the Second Festival Internacional de Orizaba. On Saturday the 20th of February 2016, by special invitation of the Honduran Embassy in Nicaragua, members of the group performed at El Evento Cultural II in La Plaza de Los Colores, in Puerto Salvador Allende, Managua, Nicaragua.

== Performances ==
The group specializes in dances and costumes characteristic of the towns and villages of its home region of Intibucá, in the highlands of Honduras. Ballet Folklórico Oro Lenca draws its inspiration from the stories and traditions of the indigenous, colonial, and creole background of La Esperanza and Intibucá. The group works hard to re-infuse folk traditions in the local communities and their festivities. Many of their performances are in the parks, community centers and streets from which these traditions arose. Their dancers and the audiences include people whose grandparents participated in dance wearing the same costumes that Oro Lenca has resurrected.

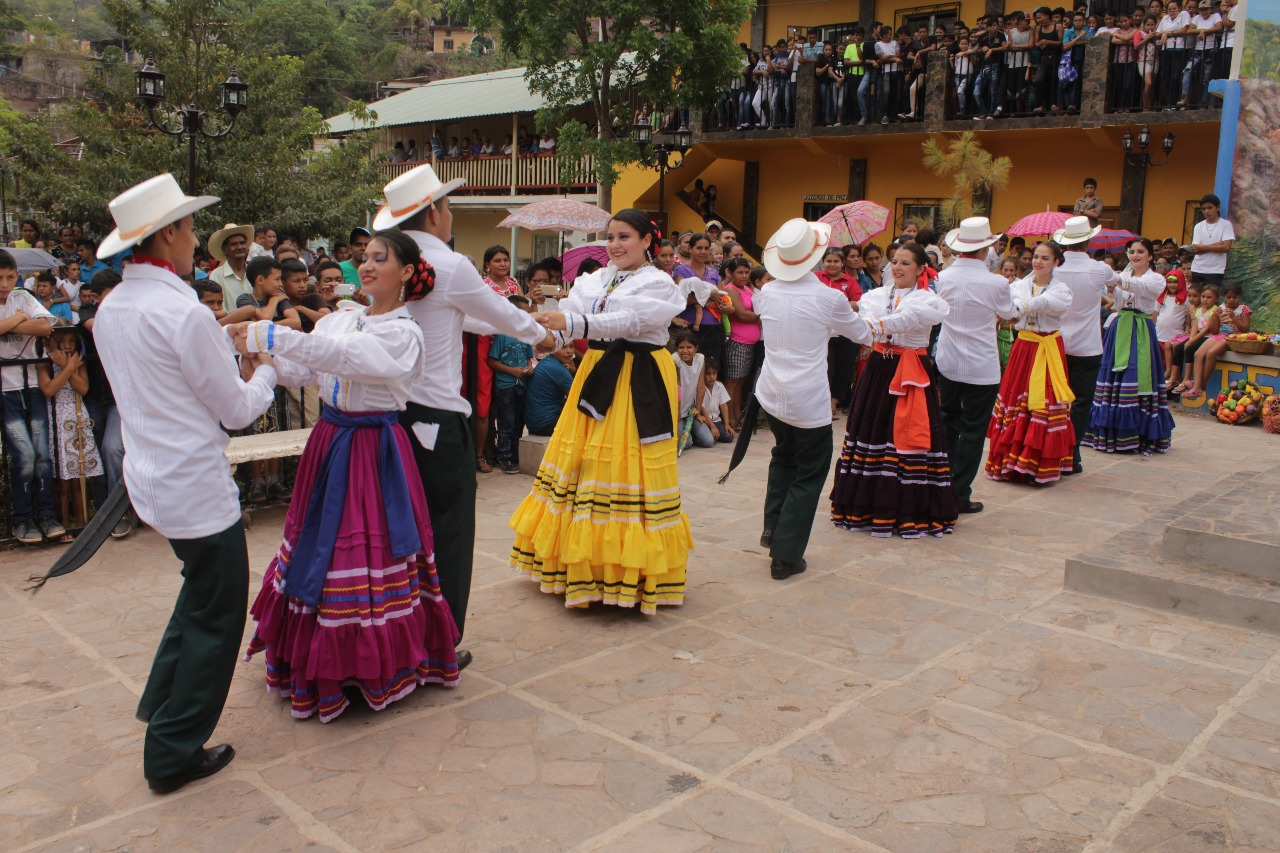
Members of the Ballet Folklórico de Honduras Oro Lenca wearing the Villa of Camasca costume while dancing in the 100-year anniversary celebration of the town of El Nispero.

As characteristic of folk art, the dances document the life and stories in traditional communities. These are stories of harvests, religious celebrations, courtship between young men and women, folk tales, illness and death, often mixed with whimsy and humor. While much of their dance concentrates on these roots, the group also experiments by mixing traditional choreographies with modern Latin forms, such as salsa and merengue, that are currently popular in Honduras. Some of their performances include a progression of all forms to span the history of Honduras from its indigenous roots to a modern society in the Americas. The presentations sometimes include only a few dances as part of a larger program or can extend up to a couple of hours on stage before a large audience.

Ballet Folklórico Oro Lenca performs not only in their local region, but also in other communities and cities in Honduras. The group often responds to requests to provide dance workshops for dance groups, especially newly forming groups, in other communities, such as Ocotepeque and Naranjito. Annually, they have helped Hispanic prisoners incarcerated in the United States celebrate their traditions. In January 2016 The Explorers Network filmed an indigenous dance performed by Ballet Folklórico Oro Lenca as part of their special production La Ruta Lenca to the Golfo de Fonseca.

== Wardrobe ==
Ballet Folklórico Oro Lenca has an extensive wardrobe of indigenous, creole, colonial, and modern dance costumes. The group has several signature costumes particular to the region. The white indigenous dance costume of La Esperanza is emblematic of the native peoples of Intibucá and Honduras. Members of the group also often perform in the traditional costume from the village of Guajiniquil in the municipality of Concepción in Intibucá. This 19th-century costume had all but vanished until it was researched and resurrected by Johann Serén in 2008. The Guajiniquil costume combines both creole and colonial influences and is recognized as an authentic regional dance costume by the Department of Protection of Cultural Heritage of the Instituto Hondureño de Antropología e Historia. This costume is worn now by other dance groups in Honduras. Between 2009 and 2016, Johann Serén researched the Villa of Camasca dance costume from the municipality of Camasca. The first public appearance for this costume was at the National Palito Verde Festival in Azacualpa, Santa Barbara, on July 28, 2016 and it was received by the executive management of the Department of Culture and Arts on August 24, 2017. Annie Haylock de Orellana of La Esperanza is the exclusive tailor for the Ballet Folklórico Oro Lenca. She assembles both traditional and modern costumes integral to the group's public performances.

== El Grande de Grandes ==
On the last Saturday of October, (Note: The national dance festival El Grande de Grandes was initially designated to occur on the last Saturday of July. Starting in 2015, the date was moved to the last Saturday of October to accommodate other festivals that occur earlier in the calendar as well as the performance and practice schedules of the participant and host dance groups.) Ballet Folklórico Oro Lenca hosts an annual folk dance festival El Grande de Grandes. Members of the dance troupe manage all details of the festival and present awards to winning groups and dancers. Oro Lenca initially staged El Grande de Grandes in 2011, and since then it has grown into the preeminent national dance competition, which draws contestants from all parts of the country.

Schools and community dance groups in Honduras host many regional and national dance competitions and festivals throughout the calendar year. Rules for competitions are defined by The National Association of Folkloric Dance Instructors of Honduras (ANIDAFH), which oversees regional and national competitions for primary and middle schools throughout Honduras. There are many folkloric competitions and festivals in Honduras every year. Notable among these are the Concurso Nacional de Danzas Folkloricas for school groups organized by ANIDAFH; the Encuentro Nacional de Danzas Folklóricas "El Marcalino" in Marcala, La Paz; the Festival Folklórica "El Tomate" in San Vicente Centenario, Santa Bárbara; the Festival Folklórico Nacional "La Tusa" in Nuevo Celilac, Santa Bárbara; the Festival de Las Escobas in La Paz; the Concurso Folklórico Nacional JADE in Tegucigalpa; the Festival de La Rosquilia in San Nicolás, Santa Bárbara; the Festival Regional "Naranjos y Cafe" in Marcala La Paz; the Festival Folklórico "EL AMISTOSO" in Catacamas, Olancho; the Festival Folklórico "Bahía de Tela" in Tela Atlantida; the Festival De Danzas Folklóricas "SEHON" in San Pedro Sula, Cortés; and the longest continuously running competition, the Encuentro Folklórico Nacional "Gran Pereke", organized by ANIDAFH.

Each calendar year, El Grande de Grandes in La Esperanza is the last and largest festival, incorporating competitions at all levels. The festival has a modest entrance fee for spectators and attracts a large audience from both local and remote communities. The festival also includes speeches and recognitions of individuals and groups that support folklore investigation and education in Honduras. As host for El Grande de Grandes, Ballet Folklórico Oro Lenca does not participate as a contestant, but does present an exhibition performance during the festival. El Grande de Grandes includes several competitive levels in which groups from primary schools, high schools, graduates, and community groups compete. Each group is allowed one performance. The day starts with youngest school groups and proceeds through the levels. Prizes are awarded in each category, and the group with the highest score is awarded the grand prize for the entire competition. The judges are selected from the national dance community.

== Marca País Honduras ==
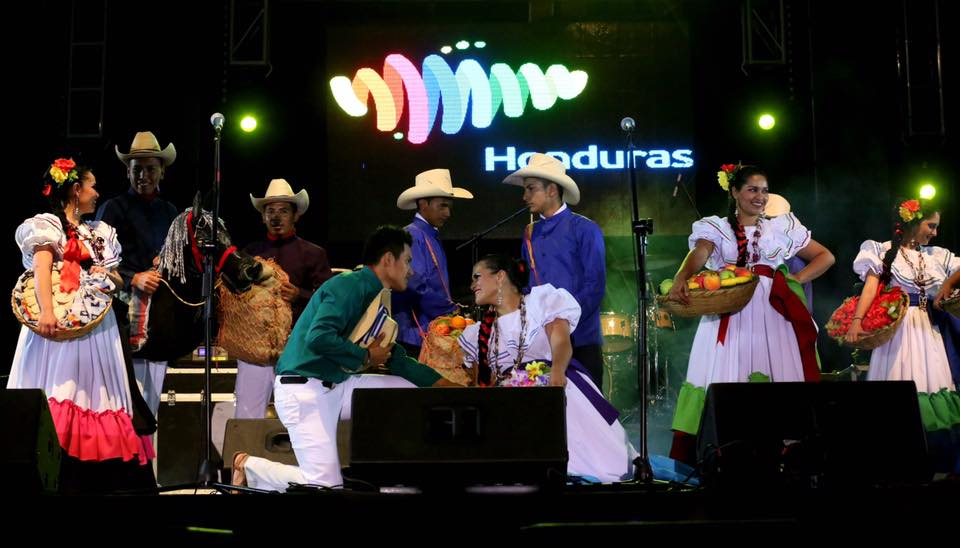
Ballet Folklórico de Honduras Oro Lenca in Telethon with Marca Pais Honduras.

On June 20, 2016, Oro Lenca along with 11 other companies and organizations from various areas of Honduras was affiliated with Marca País Honduras. This agreement allows Oro Lenca to bear the stamp of the Marca País Honduras as part of a national initiative to promote investment, exports, tourism, and national pride.

== See also ==
- Baile Folklórico
- Culture of Honduras
- List of folk dance performance groups
- La Esperanza, Honduras
- Music of Honduras
