= Circles of latitude between the 10th parallel north and the 15th parallel north =

Circles of latitude

Following are circles of latitude between the 10th parallel north and the 15th parallel north:

== 11th parallel north ==
11th parallel north (interactive map)

The 11th parallel north is a circle of latitude that is 11 degrees north of the Earth's equatorial plane. It crosses Africa, the Indian Ocean, South Asia, Southeast Asia, the Pacific Ocean, Central America, South America, and the Atlantic Ocean.

At this latitude the sun is visible for 12 hours, 46 minutes during the summer solstice and 11 hours, 29 minutes during the winter solstice.

In Thailand, a 1966 cabinet resolution restricts the rights of non-Thai companies to conduct mineral exploration or mining operations north of this parallel.

=== As a border ===
The border between Ghana and what was then French Upper Volta (now Burkina Faso) was fixed by treaty between the French and British at the Conference of Paris in 1898, to be the 11th parallel. The border does not follow the boundary exactly, but follows it approximately, crossing over it several times.

=== Around the world ===
Starting at the Prime Meridian and heading eastwards, the parallel 11° north passes through:

| Coordinates | Country, territory or sea | Notes |
|---|---|---|
| 11°0′N 0°0′E | Ghana | |
| 11°0′N 0°2′E | Togo | |
| 11°0′N 0°30′E | Burkina Faso | |
| 11°0′N 0°55′E | Benin | |
| 11°0′N 3°45′E | Nigeria | |
| 11°0′N 13°46′E | Cameroon | |
| 11°0′N 15°3′E | Chad | |
| 11°0′N 22°28′E | Central African Republic | The extreme north of the country, for about 8 km |
| 11°0′N 22°32′E | Chad | |
| 11°0′N 22°54′E | Sudan | |
| 11°0′N 32°25′E | South Sudan | |
| 11°0′N 33°14′E | Sudan | |
| 11°0′N 34°58′E | Ethiopia | |
| 11°0′N 41°48′E | Djibouti | |
| 11°0′N 42°27′E | Ethiopia | |
| 11°0′N 42°47′E | Djibouti | |
| 11°0′N 42°58′E | Somalia | Somaliland |
| 11°0′N 43°39′E | Gulf of Aden | |
| 11°0′N 47°6′E | Somalia | Somaliland and Puntland |
| 11°0′N 51°7′E | Indian Ocean | Arabian Sea; Passing between the islands of Bangaram and Amini in India's Lakshadweep Islands; Lakshadweep Sea |
| 11°0′N 75°51′E | India | Kerala; Tamil Nadu – passing through Coimbatore; Puducherry: Karaikal district, for about 4 km |
| 11°0′N 79°51′E | Indian Ocean | Bay of Bengal; Passing between Rutland Island and Little Andaman in India's Andaman and Nicobar Islands; Andaman Sea – passing just north of the island of Lanbi Kyun, Myanmar |
| 11°0′N 98°26′E | Myanmar (Burma) | Island of Kau-ye Kyun, and the mainland |
| 11°0′N 99°6′E | Thailand | |
| 11°0′N 99°29′E | Gulf of Thailand | |
| 11°0′N 103°6′E | Cambodia | |
| 11°0′N 103°25′E | Bay of Kompong Som | |
| 11°0′N 103°39′E | Cambodia | |
| 11°0′N 105°42′E | Vietnam | For about 10 km |
| 11°0′N 105°47′E | Cambodia | |
| 11°0′N 106°12′E | Vietnam | Passing just north of Ho Chi Minh City, through the suburb of Thủ Dầu Một |
| 11°0′N 108°21′E | South China Sea | Passing through the disputed Spratly Islands |
| 11°0′N 119°16′E | Philippines | Island of Palawan |
| 11°0′N 119°30′E | Sulu Sea | Passing amongst the Cuyo Islands, Philippines |
| 11°0′N 122°2′E | Philippines | Island of Panay |
| 11°0′N 122°51′E | Guimaras Strait | |
| 11°0′N 123°11′E | Philippines | Island of Negros (northernmost tip) |
| 11°0′N 123°12′E | Visayan Sea | |
| 11°0′N 123°56′E | Philippines | Island of Cebu |
| 11°0′N 124°2′E | Camotes Sea | |
| 11°0′N 124°26′E | Philippines | Island of Leyte |
| 11°0′N 125°2′E | Pacific Ocean | |
| 11°0′N 125°37′E | Philippines | Island of Manicani |
| 11°0′N 125°39′E | Pacific Ocean | |
| 11°0′N 125°47′E | Philippines | Island of Calicoan |
| 11°0′N 125°48′E | Pacific Ocean | Passing just south of Ailinginae and Rongelap atolls, Marshall Islands; Passing just south of Toke atoll, Marshall Islands |
| 11°0′N 85°43′W | Costa Rica | |
| 11°0′N 85°4′W | Nicaragua | |
| 11°0′N 84°49′W | Costa Rica | |
| 11°0′N 84°29′W | Nicaragua | |
| 11°0′N 83°47′W | Caribbean Sea | |
| 11°0′N 74°47′W | Colombia | Passing through Barranquilla |
| 11°0′N 74°34′W | Caribbean Sea | |
| 11°0′N 74°17′W | Colombia | |
| 11°0′N 72°31′W | Venezuela | |
| 11°0′N 71°37′W | Caribbean Sea | Gulf of Venezuela |
| 11°0′N 71°12′W | Venezuela | |
| 11°0′N 68°19′W | Caribbean Sea | Passing just north of La Tortuga Island, Venezuela |
| 11°0′N 64°23′W | Venezuela | Isla Margarita |
| 11°0′N 63°47′W | Caribbean Sea | Passing between the islands of Trinidad and Tobago, Trinidad and Tobago |
| 11°0′N 61°0′W | Atlantic Ocean | Passing just south of the Bissagos Islands, Guinea-Bissau |
| 11°0′N 15°14′W | Guinea-Bissau | |
| 11°0′N 14°57′W | Guinea | |
| 11°0′N 8°41′W | Mali | |
| 11°0′N 8°31′W | Guinea | |
| 11°0′N 8°17′W | Mali | |
| 11°0′N 5°29′W | Burkina Faso | |
| 11°0′N 2°50′W | Ghana | For about 8 km |
| 11°0′N 2°46′W | Burkina Faso | |
| 11°0′N 1°35′W | Ghana | |
| 11°0′N 1°24′W | Burkina Faso | |
| 11°0′N 1°7′W | Ghana | For about 9 km |
| 11°0′N 1°3′W | Burkina Faso | |
| 11°0′N 0°50′W | Ghana | For about 2 km |
| 11°0′N 0°48′W | Burkina Faso | |
| 11°0′N 0°30′W | Ghana | |

== 12th parallel north ==
12th parallel north (interactive map)

The 12th parallel north is a circle of latitude that is 12 degrees north of the Earth's equatorial plane. It crosses Africa, the Indian Ocean, South Asia, Southeast Asia, the Pacific Ocean, Central America, South America, and the Atlantic Ocean.

At this latitude the sun is visible for 12 hours, 50 minutes during the summer solstice and 11 hours, 25 minutes during the winter solstice.

=== Around the world ===
Starting at the Prime Meridian and heading eastwards, the parallel 12° north passes through:

| Coordinates | Country, territory or sea | Notes |
|---|---|---|
| 12°0′N 0°0′E | Burkina Faso | |
| 12°0′N 2°19′E | Niger | For about 15 km |
| 12°0′N 2°28′E | Benin | |
| 12°0′N 3°15′E | Niger | |
| 12°0′N 3°40′E | Nigeria | Passing through Kano |
| 12°0′N 14°38′E | Cameroon | |
| 12°0′N 15°5′E | Chad | Passing just south of N'Djamena |
| 12°0′N 22°37′E | Sudan | |
| 12°0′N 32°45′E | South Sudan | |
| 12°0′N 33°13′E | Sudan | |
| 12°0′N 35°18′E | Ethiopia | Passing through Lake Tana |
| 12°0′N 42°5′E | Djibouti | |
| 12°0′N 43°23′E | Indian Ocean | Gulf of Aden – passing just north of the northernmost point of Somalia; Arabian Sea – passing just south of the Socotra archipelago, Yemen |
| 12°0′N 75°15′E | India | Kerala; Karnataka; Tamil Nadu; Puducherry – for about 4 km Tamil Nadu |
| 12°0′N 79°51′E | Indian Ocean | Bay of Bengal |
| 12°0′N 92°37′E | India | Andaman and Nicobar Islands – South Andaman Island and Havelock Island |
| 12°0′N 93°1′E | Indian Ocean | Andaman Sea |
| 12°0′N 97°44′E | Myanmar (Burma) | Mergui Archipelago and mainland |
| 12°0′N 99°35′E | Thailand | Prachuap Khiri Khan province |
| 12°0′N 99°52′E | Gulf of Thailand | |
| 12°0′N 102°18′E | Thailand | Island of Ko Chang |
| 12°0′N 102°25′E | Gulf of Thailand | |
| 12°0′N 102°46′E | Thailand | Trat province – for about 1 km |
| 12°0′N 102°47′E | Cambodia | |
| 12°0′N 106°45′E | Vietnam | |
| 12°0′N 109°14′E | South China Sea | Passing just north of the island of Culion, Philippines |
| 12°0′N 120°1′E | Philippines | Busuanga Island |
| 12°0′N 120°20′E | Sulu Sea | |
| 12°0′N 121°22′E | Philippines | Semirara Island |
| 12°0′N 121°24′E | Sulu Sea | Passing just north of the island of Molocamboc, Philippines; Passing just north of the island of Borocay, Philippines |
| 12°0′N 121°55′E | Sibuyan Sea | |
| 12°0′N 123°11′E | Philippines | Masbate Island |
| 12°0′N 123°15′E | Visayan Sea | Asid Gulf |
| 12°0′N 123°43′E | Philippines | Masbate Island |
| 12°0′N 124°2′E | Samar Sea | Passing just south of the island of Tagapul-an, Philippines; Passing just north of the island of Almagro, Philippines; Passing just north of the island of Camandag, Philippines |
| 12°0′N 124°41′E | Philippines | Samar Island |
| 12°0′N 125°28′E | Pacific Ocean | Passing just north of Enewetak atoll, Marshall Islands; Passing just north of Bikini Atoll, Marshall Islands; Passing just south of Bikar Atoll, Marshall Islands |
| 12°0′N 86°41′W | Nicaragua | Passing through Lake Nicaragua |
| 12°0′N 83°46′W | Caribbean Sea | Passing just south of the Corn Islands, Nicaragua; Passing just south of the Albuquerque Cays, Colombia |
| 12°0′N 72°11′W | Colombia | Guajira Peninsula |
| 12°0′N 71°9′W | Caribbean Sea | Gulf of Venezuela |
| 12°0′N 70°15′W | Venezuela | Paraguaná Peninsula |
| 12°0′N 69°49′W | Caribbean Sea | Passing between the islands of Curaçao and Klein Curaçao, Curaçao; Passing just south of the island of Bonaire, Netherlands; Passing just north of the Las Aves archipelago, Venezuela; Passing just north of the Los Roques archipelago, Venezuela; Passing just north of La Orchila island, Venezuela; Passing just north of Blanquilla Island, Venezuela |
| 12°0′N 61°48′W | Grenada | |
| 12°0′N 61°42′W | Atlantic Ocean | |
| 12°0′N 16°20′W | Guinea-Bissau | |
| 12°0′N 13°42′W | Guinea | |
| 12°0′N 11°16′W | Mali | For about 3 km |
| 12°0′N 11°14′W | Guinea | |
| 12°0′N 10°46′W | Mali | |
| 12°0′N 10°34′W | Guinea | |
| 12°0′N 8°48′W | Mali | |
| 12°0′N 4°55′W | Burkina Faso | |
| 12°0′N 4°45′W | Mali | For about 1 km |
| 12°0′N 4°44′W | Burkina Faso | |

== 13th parallel north ==
13th parallel north (interactive map)

The 13th parallel north is a circle of latitude 13 degrees north of the Earth's equatorial plane. It crosses Africa, Asia, the Indian Ocean, the Pacific Ocean, Central America, the Caribbean, and the Atlantic Ocean.

At this latitude, the sun is visible for 12 hours 53 minutes during the summer solstice and 11 hours 22 minutes during the winter solstice.

=== Around the world ===
Starting at the Prime Meridian and heading eastwards, the parallel 13° north passes through:

| Coordinates | Country, territory or sea | Notes |
|---|---|---|
| 13°0′N 0°0′E | Burkina Faso | |
| 13°0′N 1°7′E | Niger | |
| 13°0′N 4°6′E | Nigeria | |
| 13°0′N 6°55′E | Niger | For about 14 km (8.7 mi) |
| 13°0′N 7°3′E | Nigeria | |
| 13°0′N 8°36′E | Niger | |
| 13°0′N 9°50′E | Nigeria | |
| 13°0′N 13°48′E | Lake Chad | Passing through territorial waters of Cameroon |
| 13°0′N 15°10′E | Chad | |
| 13°0′N 21°54′E | Sudan | |
| 13°0′N 36°10′E | Ethiopia | |
| 13°0′N 41°53′E | Eritrea | |
| 13°0′N 42°44′E | Red Sea | |
| 13°0′N 43°23′E | Yemen | |
| 13°0′N 45°10′E | Indian Ocean | Gulf of Aden (passing just north of Socotra); Arabian Sea; Laccadive Sea |
| 13°0′N 74°47′E | India | Karnataka - passing through Bangalore; Andhra Pradesh; Tamil Nadu - passing through the southern parts of Chennai |
| 13°0′N 80°16′E | Indian Ocean | Bay of Bengal - passing just north of Interview Island, India |
| 13°0′N 92°49′E | India | Andaman and Nicobar Islands - North Andaman Island |
| 13°0′N 92°57′E | Indian Ocean | Andaman Sea (passing just north of Sound Island) |
| 13°0′N 98°17′E | Myanmar (Burma) | Island of Mali Kyun |
| 13°0′N 98°18′E | Indian Ocean | Andaman Sea |
| 13°0′N 98°36′E | Myanmar (Burma) | |
| 13°0′N 99°11′E | Thailand | Phetchaburi province |
| 13°0′N 100°4′E | Bay of Bangkok | |
| 13°0′N 100°56′E | Thailand | Passing just north of Pattaya |
| 13°0′N 102°32′E | Cambodia | Passing through Tonlé Sap lake |
| 13°0′N 107°30′E | Vietnam | |
| 13°0′N 109°23′E | South China Sea | |
| 13°0′N 120°46′E | Philippines | Island of Mindoro |
| 13°0′N 121°29′E | Tablas Strait | Passing just north of Maestre de Campo Island, Philippines |
| 13°0′N 122°0′E | Sibuyan Sea | Passing just north of Banton Island, Philippines |
| 13°0′N 123°1′E | Philippines | Island of Burias |
| 13°0′N 123°8′E | Burias Pass | |
| 13°0′N 123°28′E | Philippines | Island of Luzon |
| 13°0′N 124°9′E | Pacific Ocean | Passing just south of Guam |
| 13°0′N 87°38′W | Nicaragua | Passing through the Cosigüina volcano |
| 13°0′N 87°30′W | Pacific Ocean | Gulf of Fonseca |
| 13°0′N 87°19′W | Honduras | Extreme south of the country |
| 13°0′N 87°1′W | Nicaragua | |
| 13°0′N 83°32′W | Caribbean Sea | |
| 13°0′N 61°15′W | Saint Vincent and the Grenadines | Island of Bequia |
| 13°0′N 61°13′W | Atlantic Ocean | Passing just south of Barbados |
| 13°0′N 16°45′W | Senegal | |
| 13°0′N 11°25′W | Mali | |
| 13°0′N 4°16′W | Burkina Faso | |

== 14th parallel north ==
14th parallel north (interactive map)

The 14th parallel north is a circle of latitude that is 14 degrees north of the Earth's equatorial plane. It crosses Africa, Asia, the Indian Ocean, the Pacific Ocean, Central America, the Caribbean, and the Atlantic Ocean.

At this latitude the sun is visible for 12 hours, 57 minutes during the summer solstice and 11 hours, 18 minutes during the winter solstice.

=== Around the world ===
Starting at the Prime Meridian and heading eastwards, the parallel 14° north passes through:

| Coordinates | Country, territory or sea | Notes |
|---|---|---|
| 14°0′N 0°0′E | Burkina Faso | |
| 14°0′N 0°25′E | Niger | The border with Chad is in Lake Chad |
| 14°0′N 13°34′E | Chad | |
| 14°0′N 22°19′E | Sudan | |
| 14°0′N 36°28′E | Ethiopia | |
| 14°0′N 41°1′E | Eritrea | |
| 14°0′N 41°39′E | Red Sea | |
| 14°0′N 42°41′E | Yemen | Zuqar Island |
| 14°0′N 42°47′E | Red Sea | |
| 14°0′N 43°9′E | Yemen | |
| 14°0′N 47°54′E | Indian Ocean | Arabian Sea |
| 14°0′N 48°10′E | Yemen | |
| 14°0′N 48°28′E | Indian Ocean | Arabian Sea |
| 14°0′N 74°30′E | India | Karnataka; Andhra Pradesh; Karnataka - for about 3 km (1.9 mi); Andhra Pradesh |
| 14°0′N 80°9′E | Indian Ocean | Bay of Bengal |
| 14°0′N 93°13′E | Myanmar (Burma) | Little Coco Island |
| 14°0′N 93°14′E | Indian Ocean | Andaman Sea - passing just south of Great Coco Island, Myanmar |
| 14°0′N 98°3′E | Myanmar (Burma) | |
| 14°0′N 99°0′E | Thailand | Passing just north of Rangsit near Bangkok |
| 14°0′N 102°52′E | Cambodia | |
| 14°0′N 105°50′E | Laos | |
| 14°0′N 106°8′E | Cambodia | |
| 14°0′N 107°23′E | Vietnam | |
| 14°0′N 109°15′E | South China Sea | Passing just north of Lubang Island, Philippines |
| 14°0′N 120°37′E | Philippines | Island of Luzon - passing through Taal Lake, and Taal Volcano on an island in the lake |
| 14°0′N 121°56′E | Lamon Bay | Passing by the southernmost tip of Alabat Island, Philippines |
| 14°0′N 122°19′E | Philippines | Island of Luzon |
| 14°0′N 123°3′E | San Miguel Bay | |
| 14°0′N 123°13′E | Philippines | Island of Luzon |
| 14°0′N 123°24′E | Pacific Ocean | Philippine Sea |
| 14°0′N 124°7′E | Philippines | Island of Catanduanes |
| 14°0′N 124°17′E | Pacific Ocean | Philippine Sea passing just south of Rota, Northern Mariana Islands and into an unnamed part of the ocean |
| 14°0′N 91°26′W | Guatemala | |
| 14°0′N 89°56′W | El Salvador | Passing through the municipalities of Ahuachapán Centro, Ahuachapán Norte, Santa Ana Oeste, Santa Ana Centro, La Libertad Norte, San Salvador Norte, Cuscatlán Norte, Chalatenango Sur and Cabañas Este. |
| 14°0′N 88°35′W | Honduras | Intibucá - passing just south of municipalities of San Antonio and Santa Lucía. |
| 14°0′0″N 88°6′25″W | El Salvador | Morazán - passing just north of the district of Perquín. |
| 14°0′0″N 88°6′11″W | Honduras | Passing the departments of La Paz, Francisco Morazán and El Paraíso. |
| 14°0′N 86°8′W | Nicaragua | |
| 14°0′N 86°1′W | Honduras | |
| 14°0′N 85°40′W | Nicaragua | |
| 14°0′N 83°25′W | Caribbean Sea | |
| 14°0′N 61°1′W | Saint Lucia | Passing just south of Castries |
| 14°0′N 60°53′W | Atlantic Ocean | |
| 14°0′N 16°47′W | Senegal | |
| 14°0′N 12°1′W | Mali | |
| 14°0′N 2°51′W | Burkina Faso | |

== 15th parallel north ==
15th parallel north (interactive map)

The 15th parallel north is a circle of latitude that is 15 degrees north of the Earth's equatorial plane. It crosses the Saharan fringe (the Sahel) in Africa, three key peninsulas of Asia (between which parts of the Indian Ocean), the Pacific Ocean, an isthmus of Central America, the southern Caribbean, and the Atlantic Ocean.

In the Chadian-Libyan conflict of 1978 to 1987, its intra-Chad part came to be known as the "Red Line", separating opposing combatants, above all in Operation Manta.

At this latitude the sun is visible for 13 hours, 1 minute during the summer solstice and 11 hours, 14 minutes during the winter solstice.

=== Around the world ===
Starting at the Prime Meridian and heading eastwards, the parallel 15° north passes through:

| Coordinates | Country, territory or sea | Notes |
|---|---|---|
| 15°0′N 0°0′E | Mali | |
| 15°0′N 1°0′E | Niger | |
| 15°0′N 13°51′E | Chad | |
| 15°0′N 22°47′E | Sudan | |
| 15°0′N 36°27′E | Eritrea | |
| 15°0′N 40°32′E | Red Sea | |
| 15°0′N 42°53′E | Yemen | |
| 15°0′N 50°26′E | Indian Ocean | Arabian Sea |
| 15°0′N 74°1′E | India | Goa; Karnataka; Andhra Pradesh |
| 15°0′N 80°3′E | Indian Ocean | Bay of Bengal; Passing just north of the island of Preparis, Myanmar; Andaman Sea |
| 15°0′N 97°47′E | Myanmar (Burma) | |
| 15°0′N 98°13′E | Thailand | Passing through Nakhon Ratchasima |
| 15°0′N 105°35′E | Laos | |
| 15°0′N 107°28′E | Vietnam | |
| 15°0′N 108°55′E | South China Sea | Passing just south of the disputed Scarborough Shoal |
| 15°0′N 120°3′E | Philippines | Island of Luzon |
| 15°0′N 121°33′E | Pacific Ocean | Polillo Strait |
| 15°0′N 121°49′E | Philippines | Island of Polillo |
| 15°0′N 122°3′E | Pacific Ocean | Philippine Sea |
| 15°0′N 145°35′E | Northern Mariana Islands | Island of Tinian |
| 15°0′N 145°40′E | Pacific Ocean | Passing north of Bokak Atoll, Marshall Islands |
| 15°0′N 92°43′W | Mexico | Chiapas |
| 15°0′N 92°8′W | Guatemala | |
| 15°0′N 89°11′W | Honduras | |
| 15°0′N 83°25′W | Nicaragua | For about 11 km |
| 15°0′N 83°18′W | Honduras | |
| 15°0′N 83°9′W | Caribbean Sea | Passing between Dominica and Martinique (France) |
| 15°0′N 61°15′W | Atlantic Ocean | |
| 15°0′N 24°28′W | Cape Verde | Island of Fogo |
| 15°0′N 24°18′W | Atlantic Ocean | |
| 15°0′N 23°44′W | Cape Verde | Island of Santiago |
| 15°0′N 23°27′W | Atlantic Ocean | |
| 15°0′N 17°4′W | Senegal | |
| 15°0′N 12°28′W | Mauritania | |
| 15°0′N 11°48′W | Mali | |
| 15°0′N 0°50′W | Burkina Faso | |
| 15°0′N 0°2′W | Mali | |

== See also ==
- Circles of latitude between the 5th parallel north and the 10th parallel north
- Circles of latitude between the 15th parallel north and the 20th parallel north
