= Honducor =

Honduran mail service

- Industry: Postal administration
- Founded: September 1933
- Headquarters: Tegucigalpa
- Products: First class mail Domestic mail Logistics
- Website: honducor.gob.hn

Honducor is the mail service of Honduras.

== History ==
Honducor was created as part of legislation 120–93 in September 1993, and was implemented according to regulation 004521-A. Honducor began its operations in Honduras in September 1993.

Honducor internal policies are subject by these policies established by the Universal Postal Union (UPU), The Americas Spain and Portugal Postal Union, and the Central American Postal Union Association (Including Dominican Republic). Under the secretary of labor, transportation and housing (SOPTRAVI for Spanish acronym) in Honduras.

Honducor is a decentralized mail service with over 205 offices, is run within the public and private sector, and is funded by its own services and by the state.

== Mission ==
- Provide non-exclusive postal service to Honduras.
- Obtain related commercial contracts aligned with social objectives, while keeping service in the country.
- Perform all operations that are complementary and permitted by law. Honducor is obligated to provide service in compliance with international agreements.
- Compete with better technology, offer new products and services, and improve systems.
- Refine the mission and vision to accommodate changes needed to embark in new venues, lift the quality of service and satisfy the social roles that the state has assigned.

== Honduras Zip Codes ==
Departments / City / Location

=== Atlantida ===
1. La Ceiba 31101
2. Tela 31301

=== Colon ===
1. Trujillo 32101
2. Tocoa 32301

=== Comayagua ===
1. Comayagua 12101
2. Siguatepeque 12111

=== Copan ===
1. Santa Rosa de Copán 41101
2. La Entrada 41202
3. La Ruidosa 41203

=== Cortes ===
1. San Pedro Sula
  1. Sector N.E. 21101
  2. Sector N.W. 21102
  3. Sector S.E. 21103
  4. Sector S.W. 21104

=== Puerto Cortes ===
1. Puerto Cortes 21301

=== Choluteca ===
1. Choluteca 51101
2. Pespire 51201

=== El Paraiso ===
1. Yuscaran 13101
2. Danli 13201

=== Francisco Morazan ===
1. Tegucigalpa 11101
2. Comayaguela 12101

=== Gracias A Dios ===
1. Puerto Lempira 33101

=== Intibucá ===
1. Intibucá 14000
2. La Esperanza 14101
3. Jesús de Otoro 14201
4. All other municipalities 14000

=== Islas de La Bahia (Bay Islands) ===
1. Roatan 34101

=== La Paz ===
1. La Paz 15101
2. Marcala 15201

=== Lempira ===
1. Gracias 42101
2. Erandique 42201

=== Ocotepeque ===
1. Ocotepeque 43101
2. San Marcos de Ocotepeque 43201

=== Olancho ===
1. Juticalpa 16101
2. Catacamas 16201

=== Santa Barbara ===
1. Santa Barbara 22101
2. Trinidad 22114

=== Valle ===
1. Nacaome 52101
2. San Lorenzo 52102

=== Yoro ===
1. Yoro 23101
2. El Progresso 23201
