= San Miguel Guancapla =

San Miguel Guancapla San Miguelito
- Municipality
- Location in Honduras
- Coordinates: 14°21′N 88°22′W
- Country: Honduras
- Department: Intibucá

Area
  - Total: 161 km^{2} (62 sq mi)

Population (2015)
  - Total: 7,781
  - Density: 48.3/km^{2} (125/sq mi)
- Postal code: 14000
- Municipality number: 1014

San Miguel Guancapla, also known as San Miguelito (Spanish pronunciation: [ˈsam miɣeˈlito]), is a municipality in the Honduran department of Intibucá.

== History ==
In the population count of 1791 there was a town with the name of Guancapla in the parish of Intibucá. It is thought that Guancapla was founded in 1589. The town was declared a municipality in 1870. When the department of Intibucá was created in 1883, Guancapla was one of the municipalities that formed the District of La Esperanza, with the name of San Miguel Guancapla. Recently for some time it was known as San Miguelito.

While for a time the locality was called San Miguelito, Decree 166-84, promulgated by the Government of the Republic under the administration of Roberto Suazo Cordova on October 2, 1984, officially designated the name of the municipality as "San Miguel Guancapla". Guancapla means "En los Guacales", which refers to a tree that produces a round fruit of woody pericarp, often used for containers.

== Geography ==
Located in a flat area, the municipality borders on the north with the municipalities of San Juan and Yamaranguila, to the south with the municipality of Dolores, to the east with the municipality of Yamaranguila and to the west with the municipality of Erandique.

== Demographics ==
At the time of the 2013 Honduras census, San Miguel Guancapla municipality had a population of 7,368. Of these, 73.54% were Indigenous (73.22% Lenca), 16.72% Mestizo, 5.02% White, 4.06% Black or Afro-Honduran and 0.66% others.

== Villages ==
The municipality has the following five villages (or aldeas):

- San Miguelito or San Miguel Guancapla (capital of the municipality)
- Chupucay or Resina
- San Antonio
- Segua
- Cofradía
