= Rafael Pineda Ponce =

Honduran politician

- President of the National Congress of Honduras (Note: Fifth President of Legislature V under the 1982 Constitution of Honduras.)
- Born: August 18, 1930; San Miguelito, Intibucá,
- Died: January 24, 2014 (aged 83); Tegucigalpa, M.D.C.
- Education: Brazil Universitária Armando de Salles Oliveira, São Paulo
- Occupations: Professor and politician
- Political party: Liberal Party of Honduras
- Spouse: María Lidia Espinoza
- Children: Alicia Pineda Espinoza, Rafael Pineda Espinoza, Octavio Pineda Espinoza, Mario Pineda Espinoza.
- Parent(s): Juan R. Pineda and María Ponce

Rafael Pineda Ponce (August 18, 1930 – January 24, 2014) was a Honduran professor and politician in the Liberal Party of Honduras and President of the National Congress of Honduras from 1998 to 2002.

== Early life and education ==
Rafael Pineda Ponce was born to Juan Rafael Pineda López and María Ponce on August 18, 1930, in a small house built by his grandparents, Caridad López Morales and Juan Rafael Pineda Flores. The house was located between Liber de Agua Zarca and Los Arrayanes next to Rio Tocó in the municipality of San Miguelito (now called San Miguel Guancapla), in the Department of Intibuca. He lived here for the first six years of his life. Pineda Ponce had one older sister, Consuelo, and two younger brothers, Rafael and Carlos (called Carlitos). Carlitos was murdered as a child between San Miguelito and El Liber while returning home after selling dulce de rapadura.

When Rafael was six, his mother, María Ponce, went back to her childhood home in Guatemala with her family, where she died soon after. After their mother left, Juan Pineda López placed Rafael and his siblings to live with relatives. Rafael first went to the city of La Esperanza, Intibucá. Afterwards he went with his sister Consuelo to live with their uncle, Filadelfo López Morales, in the village of Villa de Cofradía, in the department of Cortes. Rafael completed his elementary school education alternating between three schools "Lempira" in Cofradía, and "Juan E Flores" and "Valero Meza", both in La Esperanza. In all three schools he was highly regarded by his teachers. Rafael began his secondary education at the Instituto Departamental de Occidente (subsequently the Escuela Normal de Occidente, now the Universidad Pedagógica Nacional Francisco Morazán). He transferred to the Escuela Normal de Varones in Tegucigalpa, where he received the certificate of Maestro de Educación Primaria. He went on to earn a Bachelor of Science and Letters at the Instituto José Trinidad Reyes in San Pedro Sula.

In La Esperanza, during the third and fourth years at normal school, Pineda Ponce was elected President of the Procultural Society (Presidente de La Sociedad Pro-Cultural), which constituted the most honorable position that a student could obtain at that time. When he graduated he was awarded the Father Trino Gold Medal (Medalla de Oro Padre Trino) (Note: Padre Trino was José Trinidad Reyes, who was the founder of the Autonomous National University of Honduras and is considered a national hero of Honduras.) as the most outstanding secondary-education student, presented at the Municipal Palace in San Pedro Sula.

In 1965, Pineda Ponce went to the Universitária Armando de Salles Oliveira, in São Paulo, Brazil, to specialize in education of teachers (Especialista en Formación de Maestros). This period exposed him to some distinguished educators in Latin America. There, on April 14, he was selected as the principal orator at the Pan American Day, where he gave a speech. (Note: His Pan American Day speech included this passage: "Debo a la deferencia de mis compañeros de curso, la honrosa statisfacción de dirigirme a vosotros en este día de solemne trascendencia y de honda satisfacción humana para los pueblos de América.") He became known as a writer and orator.

== Family life ==
Rafael Pineda Ponce was married to María Lidia Espinoza, who bore their four children, Alicia, Rafael, Octavio y Mario Pineda Espinoza.

== Political life ==
Rafael Pineda Ponce was a member of the Liberal Party of Honduras or PLH . In 1980 he was appointed Secretary in the Ministry of Public Education during the provisional government of Policarpo Paz García. Pineda Ponce was an ideologue for the Liberal Party of Honduras. As well as encouraging many people to run for office after the return to democracy in 1980, he participated in many legislative initiatives, including the following:

- Childhood and Adolescence Code
- Honduran Teachers Statute
- Establishment of the Voluntary Military Service
- Fourteenth month of salary for public employees
- Law of the Banking and Insurance Commission
- Law on Financial Institutions
- Law for the Promotion of Production
- Law for the Protection of Coffee
- Law on Tax Equity
- Reforms to the Framework Law of the Electric Sub-sector
- Promotion of Production and Social Compensation
- Budgetary increase to the Family Allowances Program (PRAF) (Note: Programa de Asignacion Familiar (PRAF) is a conditional transfer program and stimulus mechanism to promote social projects to solve the basic needs of the poorest, as well as the improvement of human capital through training and the development of local resources through self-management.)
- Constitutional reform for the creation of the National Police
- New Penal Code
- Elevation to the category of constitutional figure to the Commissioner of Human Rights
- Organic Law of the Police, Law of Concessions
- Law of Incentives to the Tourist Activity
- New Code of Criminal Procedure

On November 30, 1997, after the general elections in Honduras, in which Carlos Roberto Flores won the presidential election, Pineda Ponce was named president of the National Congress of Honduras for the period 1998-2002. In the next primary election, Pineda Ponce was selected to be the Liberal candidate for the presidency. During general elections held on November 25, 2001, the Liberal Party won 55 of the 128 parliamentary seats in the National Congress of Honduras, although Pineda Ponce received only 30% of the votes and lost the election to the National Party candidate, Ricardo Maduro.

Pineda Ponce attempted to mount another presidential campaign in 2004, but participated in and supported the presidential campaign of Manuel Zelaya after Zelaya became the Liberal Party candidate in 2005. After the election, Pineda Ponce served as Minister of Education in the Zelaya government from 2006 to 2007. During his tenure as minister of education, he oversaw reactivation of the normal school system to train teachers that had been discontinued by the previous administration. This measure was taken to cover a deficit of thousands of teachers, especially for thousands of children between four and six years who had no access to kinder and preparatory education. After more than a year, Pineda Ponce realized that he was no longer able to work effectively in the Zelaya government, and after 17 months he resigned from his ministry post. In a 2008 interview, he observed that the government of Mel Zelaya "had no direction, compass, or goals" and that "improvisation, appearances and theatricality prevailed rather than the serene, judicious and accurate analysis of national problems."

== Later life and death ==
Pineda Ponce retired from government to the role of elder statesman in 2007, only to return temporarily to serve as Minister of the Presidency in the interim government of Roberto Micheletti, which arose out of the removal from power of Manuel Zelaya in the 2009 Honduran constitutional crisis. Subsequently, in a 2010 interview he opined that the Liberal Party leaders, including the ousted Zelaya, needed to unify the party to rescue power and "defend democracy." However, the embittered followers of Zelaya contested the subsequent election within the newly formed Libre Party. After the opposing National Party took control of both the presidency and congress, Pineda Ponce questioned the subsequent productivity of the government and the congress, observing that much of their legislation violated the constitution.

It was during this final period of his life that Pineda Ponce coined the expression "tilín, tilín" (cha-ching, cha-ching) that has entered the political lexicon of Honduras in reference to politicians compromising principle and party for the jingle of money.

After an illness that caused Pineda Ponce to depart from public life, the Congress met in a plenary session and voted on a decree to extend financial help to its former head and presidential candidate. Pineda Ponce died on January 24, 2014.

== Data ==
Political offices
Preceded by Eugenio Matute Canizales	Minister of Education of Honduras; 1980–1981	Succeeded by Alma Rodas de Fiallos
Preceded by Carlos Roberto Flores	President of the National Congress of Honduras; 1998–2002	Succeeded by Porfirio Lobo Sosa
Preceded by Roberto Martínez Lozano	Minister of Education of Honduras; 2006–2007	Succeeded by Marlon Brevé Reyes

== Bibliography ==
- Narváez Rosales, Renaldo (1983). Biografía del educador hondureño profesor Rafael Pineda Ponce: ex-ministro de educación pública [Biography of Honduran educator Professor Rafael Pineda Ponce: ex-minister of public education] (in Spanish). Comayagüela, D.C., C.A. OCLC 17160610.
- Pineda Ponce, Rafael (1981). Por los caminos de la patria: ideario de Rafael Pineda Ponce [Along the roads of the nation: Ideology of Rafael Pineda Ponce] (in Spanish). Tegucigalpa, D.C., Honduras, C.A. OCLC 655993721.
- Pineda Ponce, Rafael (1976). Tres años de labores en la Dirección General de Educación Primaria, 1973-1975: informe presentado al Gobierno de la República y al pueblo hondureño [Three years of work in the Directorate General of Primary Education, 1973-1975: Report submitted to the Government of the Republic and to the people of Honduras] (in Spanish). Tegucigalpa : República de Honduras, C.A: Ministerio de Educación Pública, Dirección General de Educación Primaria. OCLC 5839369.
- Ríos Gómez, Miguel Angel (1998). Biografía de un lider: Profesor Rafael Pineda Ponce [Biography of a leader: Professor Rafael Pineda Ponce] (in Spanish). San Pedro Sula, Honduras, C.A. OCLC 42397385.
