= Concepción, Intibucá =

Concepción
- Municipality
- Location in Honduras
- Coordinates: 14°2′N 88°20′W
- Country: Honduras
- Department: Intibucá
- Municipality: Concepción
- Guarajambala: 1759
- Concepción: 1867

Government
  - Type: Democratic Municipality
  - Mayor: Julio Neyder Castillo (Libre)
  - Vice Mayor: Felicita Castro López (Libre)

Area
  - Total: 91.82 km^{2} (35.45 sq mi)
- Elevation: 495 m (1,624 ft)

Population (2015)
  - Total: 10,209
  - Density: 111.2/km^{2} (288.0/sq mi)
- Time zone: UTC-6 (Central America)
- Postal code: 14000
- Municipality number: 1004

Concepción (Spanish pronunciation: [konseβˈsjon]) is a municipality in the Honduran department of Intibucá.

== History ==
According to a report by the governor of the region Alonso de Contreras Guevara in 1582, the area was originally known as Guaraxambala, which signified the "Great Jaguar River." (Note: Origen de su nombre: Guaraxambala que significa "gran río del tigre".) The original inhabitants of the municipio were the indigenous Lenca group. The first Spanish settled in ejidos established by the Lords Lucas, Manuel, Cristóbal, and Marcos Díaz, in the jurisdiction of Santiago. At this time, Feliciano del Cid of Trinidad de Jiquinlaca, Antonio Santiago of the jurisdiction of San Nicolás, Faustino López of the jurisdiction of San Miguel, and Juan Bernal de Rosa, were commissioned to survey the terrain of the new municipality.

Concepción became a municipality in 1759, with the name of "Guarajambala". Two years later, the Spanish capitanía general in Guatemala designated it as a territory forming part of the circle of Camasca belonging to Gracias. In 1867, the municipality was renamed Zepeda y Zepeda. On 23 February 1904 the presidential administration of General Manuel Bonilla named the municipality Concepción and moved it into the Department of Intibucá (Note: The Spanish version of this article (and other sources) specify that, "el 23 de febrero de 1904 el Presidente constitucional de la república, General Manuel Bonilla, le otorgó el título de Pueblo," without expanding on what that signifies. The literal translation of this phrase seems is that the Bonilla administration declared that Concepción was a town. Other sources indicate that the municipality was then named Concepción.) These changes were instituted by act 440, which took effect on 1 December of that year. The municipality took the name of the patron saint of the municipality, the Virgin of Concepción.

== Geography ==
The municipality of Concepción has an area of 91.82 square kilometres (35.45 mi^{2}). Concepción is located on the 14.03 parallel north latitude and 88.34 West longitude. Concepción is delimited to the north by the municipality of San Marco de Sierra, to the South and East by the municipality of Colomoncagua, to the West by the municipalities of Camasca and San Francisco.

The municipality is connected by a road that extends Northeast for 51.7 kilometres (32.1 mi) from Concepción to the departmental capital of La Esperanza. The road to La Esperanza is partially ballasted and partially paved and nearly always passable. Other roads continue to the Southwest to Camasca and Magdalena and to the Southeast to Olomoncaguua. A small network of roads access the aldeas around Concepción. These are passable primarily during the dry season. The rains sometimes make some of the surrounding roads impassible during the rainy season.

The surrounding region is uneven as the municipality is surrounded by hills. The topography of Concepción an inclined plane from North to South to the shore of Río Negro (the Black River). The average elevation of the municipality is 495 metres (1,624 ft) above sea level.

== Water Resources ==
Water resources include Río Negro and three smaller rivers — the San Juan, Santiago, and San Jerónimo — which drain into Río Negro.

Rio Negro, also known locally as the Guarajambala, serves as the dividing line with the department of Lempira. Río Negro forms the Southern boundary of the municipality. Río Negro begins in the mountains of Colomoncagua and Santa Elena, La Paz and drains into the Lempa river basin, which flows into the Pacific Ocean.

In Concepción Río Negro is used for artisanal fishing and the extraction of sand and gravel. It also provides a destination for domestic tourism. The San Juan River divides Concepción and the municipality of San Francisco, Lempira. It is exploited for artisanal fishing and as a source for sand. The Santiago River forms a small grassy plain that is good for grazing livestock. It is used for small scale irrigation and as a source for sand. The San Jerónimo River is used for artisanal fishing.

Twenty six communities in Concepción have water sources. However, only 21 communities have water all year around. Sixteen of those have water from one of the four rivers that run through the municipality. Four communities only have water in the rainy season.

== Climate ==
The climate of this district is semitropical, with an average temperature that ranges between 23 °C (73.4 °F) and 25 °C (77.0 °F) degrees. The average annual precipitation in the municipality is 2,000 mm (79 in) to 3,000 mm (118 in) per year. The rainiest months are June to September and the dry months are from January to April. The dry season, referred to as summer, begins in late October or early November. Winds at this time of the year blow from Northeast to the Southeast. As the wind intensity increases, this period of winds dries the soils, interrupts electrical service, and affects crops and human health.

== Population ==
Concepción has 10,605 inhabitants. Of these 5,272 are men or boys and 5,333 are women or girls. The majority of the population 5,530 (52.1%) are 17 years old or younger, 4,480 (42.2%) are ages 18–64, and 595 (5.6%) are 65 or older. The population density of the municipality of Concepción is equivalent to 115.5 people per square km (10,605 Inhabitants / 91.82 km^{2}).

=== Demographics ===
At the time of the 2013 Honduras census, Concepción municipality had a population of 9,905. Of these, 57.68% were Mestizo, 33.96% Indigenous (33.81% Lenca), 7.55% White and 0.80% Afro-Honduran or Black.

== Political divisions ==
The municipal of Concepción is split among 9 aldeas (villages) and 57 caseríos (hamlets).

Aldea	Caseríos
Concepción	El Llano; El Ovillo; Portillo del Laurel; La Crucita; Meranca; Tierra Blanca
Calusica	Gualmonce; Quebrachal; Los Tablones; San Miguelillo
Colomarigua	El Bañadero; L Caballito; La Montaña; La Zona; Los Limones; Quebrada Seca; Las Aradas
Guachipilinsito	El Guarumo; El Ojo de Agua; El Portillo; El Portillo del Norte; El Vaquero; La Calera; La Esperancita
Guajiniquil	El Espino; El Guachipilín; Mal Paso; El Ocote; Hoja Blanca; La Rinconada; Los Mangos; Plan Verde
Jiquilaca	Cuevitas; Llano Grande; Portillo los Naranjos
San Nicolás	El Chiquero o Corralón; Laurelar; El Mojote; Ojo de agua; El Portillo de Salamo; El puente o Rinconada; El Quequeste; La Laguna; La Quesera; Las Chorreras; Las Piñas; Las Vegas de San Juan; Palo Pando; Vado Real
El Rodeo	El Dorado; El Mojón; El Portillo; El Gabriel; San Jerónimo; Cerro la Mina
Santiago	El Cerrón; El Portillo del Espino

== See also ==
- Intibucá Department
- Water resources management in Honduras

== Bibliography ==
- Antecedentes históricos de los departamentos y municipios de Honduras
- Sitio Web Oficial de la Alcaldía Municipal de Concepción Intibuca
