= La Esperanza Airport (Intibucá) =

- IATA: LEZ; ICAO: MHLE

Summary
- Airport type: Public
- Serves: La Esperanza, Honduras
- Elevation AMSL: 5,492 ft / 1,674 m
- Coordinates: 14°17′25″N 88°10′30″W

Map
- Location of the airport in Honduras

Runways
Direction	Length		Surface
Direction	m	ft	Surface
03/21	960	3,150	Dirt
- Sources: GCM Google Maps SkyVector

La Esperanza Airport (IATA: LEZ, ICAO: MHLE) is an airport serving the cities of La Esperanza and Intibucá in the Intibucá Department of Honduras.

The airport is 1.6 kilometres (1 mi) south of La Esperanza. There is rising terrain northwest and southeast of the runway.

The Soto Cano VORTAC (Ident: ESC) is located 32.7 nautical miles (60.6 km) east of the airport.

== See also ==
- List of airports in Honduras
- Transport in Honduras
