= Magdalena, Intibucá =

Municipality in Honduras

Magdalena
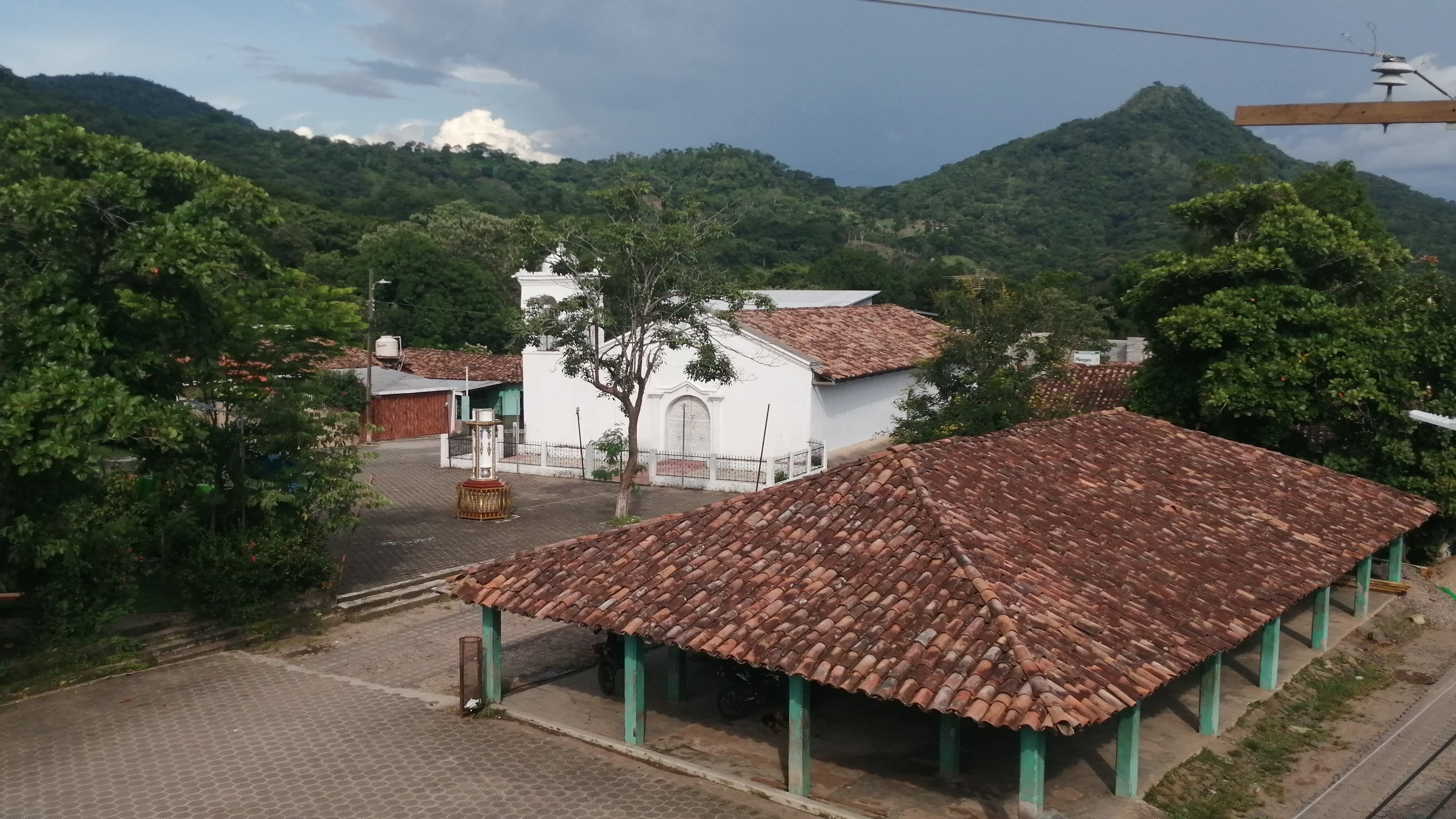
- Church in Magdalena

- Location in Honduras
- Coordinates: 13°56′02.60″N 88°22′36.70″W
- Country: Honduras
- Department: Intibucá
- Municipality: Magdalena
- Foundation: 1822; 204 years ago

Government
  - Mayor: Gustavo Adolfo del Cid

Area
  - Total: 41.61 km^{2} (16.07 sq mi)
- Elevation: 300 m (980 ft)

Population (2015)
  - Total: 4,422
  - Density: 106.3/km^{2} (275.2/sq mi)
- Time zone: UTCGMT-6
- Postal Code: 14000
- Municipality number: 1008

Magdalena (Spanish pronunciation: [maɣðaˈlena]) is a municipality in the Honduran department of Intibucá. Magdalena is located 86 km south of the city of La Esperanza and 280 km west of Tegucigalpa. The municipality consists of 7 villages and 33 hamlets.

== Demographics ==
At the time of the 2013 Honduras census, the municipality of Magdalena had a population of 4,361. Of these, 65.66% were Mestizo, 14.82% Indigenous (14.61% Lenca), 12.72% White, 1.38% Afro-Honduran or Black and 5.43% others.

== History ==
It is unclear who the first settlers of Magdalena were, where they came from, or when they established the settlement. Theindigenous towns of Camasca and Colomoncagua had already existed there in the late 17th century. According to Hector P. Nolasco, the most experienced historian in history of the municipality, it appears that Magdalena had previously consisted of estates that belonged to a part of Camasca where they divided to form a new municipality. Documents prior to the municipality's foundation at the beginning of the 18th century rerferred to it as the "Hacienda de la Magdalena", consisting of seven cavalries, and was re-allocated on 7 July 1740 on the request of Marcos Díaz, Native Indian Chief of Camasca.

According to a documentation edited by the notable professor Maria Trinidad del Cid, the municipality of Magdalena was founded on the 15th of October 1821. Maria Trinidad states that Florentín del Cid, her grandfather, held the position of municipal secretary for several years in the late 19th century, early 20th century. Significant historical documents for this time period remain intact and available to this day. However, documentation to the contract indicates that the Municipality may not have been founded until the 26th of October 1861. Thy municipality was created with the formation of the estates respectfully called: La Magdalena, San Blas, La Trinidad, La Caridad, part of the estates La Negra Vieja, San Pablo Tenamera, and the small village of San Juan Troncoso located on the southern border of Honduras with El Salvador, along the Torola River.

The constitutional mayor and chief of Camasca district joined this population on 21 June 1843 who proceeded to create paths and milestones of the demarcation of the municipality of Magdalena.

This municipality was separate from Camasca, and Magdalena municipality, which was lacking common land for its inhabitants to freely cultivate, requested the supreme government to hand over a part of Camasca municipality's common land to increase its territory. In 1870, the president of the republic was General José María Medina and governor of the department of Gracias, which this municipality belonged to, was Rosa Muñoz. The supreme government in view of the request of Magdalena's people (village), sent the land surveyor Juan Bautista Collart, in order that of Camasca's common lands measuring five cavalries of area those that passed to be common lands of this municipality. The measurement took place on 14 to 18 October 1870. The drawers of rope (string) were Doroteo and Teodosio Ramos, witnesses Valentín Días y Olayo Claros, neighbors of Santa Lucía, book-keepers were Francisco Rodríguez and Genaro Juárez, of this neighborhood. The rope (string) that was used measured 50 Spanish rods (42 m). At present, with the use of modern measuring devices and techniques, it is known that the municipality measures 41.46 km^{2} (16.01 sq mi).

== Political divisions ==
=== Neighborhoods ===
- El Castaño
- La Cultura
- El Centro
- El Recibimiento
- Barrio Abajo
- El Llano
- Buenos Aires
