= María Trinidad del Cid =

Honduran writer and feminist activist (1899–1966)

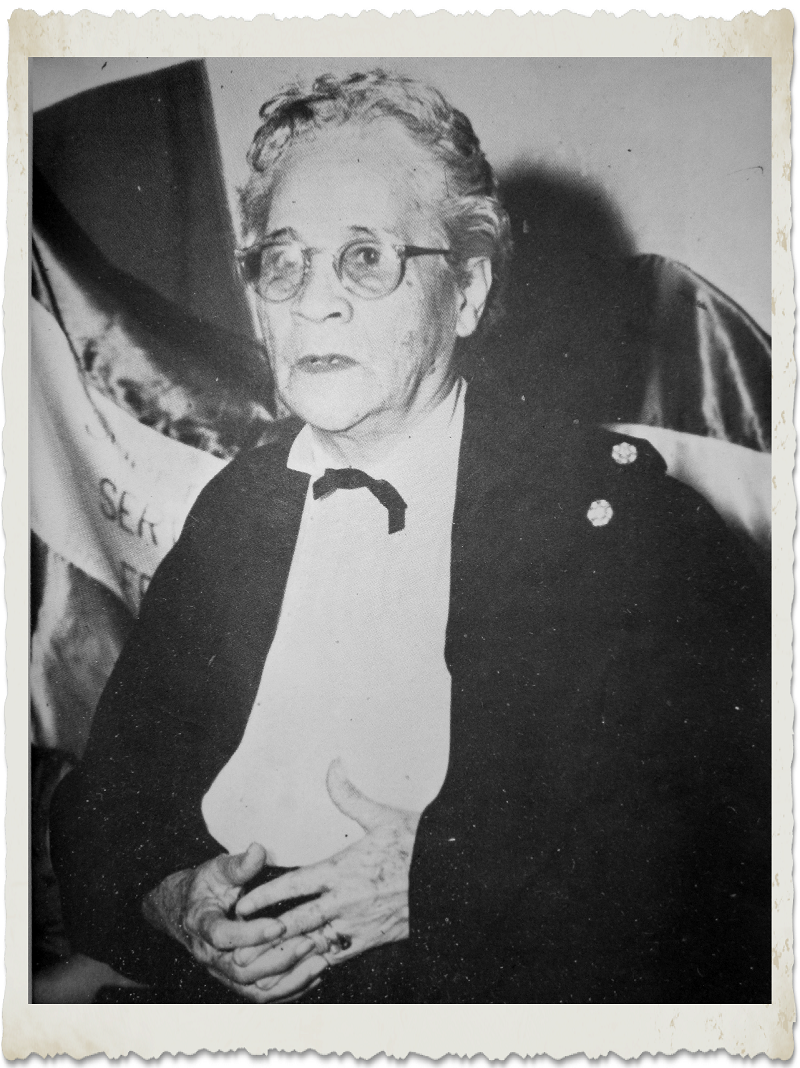
An undated photograph of María Trinidad del Cid.

María Trinidad del Cid (May 20, 1899 – November 19, 1966) was a Honduran writer, journalist, and feminist activist. She is considered a foundational figure in the fight for women's rights in Honduras.

== Biography ==
María Trinidad del Cid was born in Magdalena, Intibucá, Honduras, in 1899. She completed her primary studies in both Honduras and El Salvador, due to Magdalena's proximity to the border.

At age 16, in 1915, she began studying to be a schoolteacher at the Girls' Normal School of Comayagüela. After graduating in 1922, she began contributing to various publications as a journalist, including La Tribuna, El Amigo del Hogar, Vida, Regeneración, Antorcha, Vida Rotaria, and Revista del Archivo y Biblioteca Nacionales. She also continued her involvement in education, representing Honduras in the First Central American Education Conference, held in Costa Rica in 1928.

Trinidad del Cid served as spokesperson for the Society of Geography and History of Honduras, which was founded in 1934. She was also a member of the Honduran Institute of Inter-American Culture, the Pan-American Roundtable, the Zelaya Sierra Group, the National Magisterium, and the Women's International League for Peace and Freedom. A proponent of pan-Americanism, she also represented Honduras at the Inter-American History Congress in New Orleans in 1947 and at the Pan-American Union.

She fought for Honduran and Latin American women's political rights, founding the Honduran Women's Committee in 1947 and serving as the organization's first president. The committee swiftly affiliated with the Inter-American Commission of Women, which Trinidad del Cid participated in as a representative of Honduras.

That same year, in 1947, Trinidad del Cid founded the magazine Mujer Americana, which was affiliated with the Honduran Women's Committee and promoted women's suffrage among other causes. In 1949, she led the committee in launching "The Women's Hour" on the radio station HRN La Voz de Honduras, the country's major radio station at the time.

In addition to her journalistic work and feminist essays, Trinidad del Cid also wrote poetry, including an ode to the former Honduran political leader Francisco Morazán. In 1944 she published her first book, La vida ejemplar de doña Guadalupe Reyes de Carías. The work discusses the Carías Reyes family and contains other essays. She also wrote the novel Los Héroes in 1955.

Trinidad del Cid continued to be involved in teaching civics and moral education into her final years. She died in Tegucigalpa in 1966. In 1981, the government honored her by issuing a stamp with her image, as part of a series on the Inter-American Commission of Women.

== Selected works ==
- La vida ejemplar de doña Guadalupe Reyes de Carías (1944).
- Los Héroes (1955).
