= San Isidro, Intibucá =

San Isidro
- Municipality
- Location in Honduras
- Coordinates: 14°34′N 88°7′W
- Country: Honduras
- Department: Intibucá

Area
  - Total: 72 km^{2} (28 sq mi)

Population (2015)
  - Total: 4,591
  - Density: 64/km^{2} (170/sq mi)
- Postal code: 14000
- Municipality number: 1011

San Isidro (Spanish pronunciation: [san iˈsiðɾo]) is a municipality in the Honduran department of Intibucá.

== Demographics ==
At the time of the 2013 Honduras census, San Isidro municipality had a population of 4,387. Of these, 91.18% were Indigenous (90.77% Lenca), 7.20% Mestizo, 1.32% White and 0.30% Black or Afro-Honduran.
