= Santa Lucía, Intibucá =

Santa Lucía
- Municipality
- Location in Honduras
- Coordinates: 13°55′11″N 88°23′29″W
- Country: Honduras
- Department: Intibucá

Area
  - Total: 64 km^{2} (25 sq mi)

Population (2015)
  - Total: 5,332
  - Density: 83/km^{2} (220/sq mi)
- Postal code: 14000
- Municipality number: 1015

Santa Lucía (Spanish pronunciation: [ˈsanta luˈsi.a]) is a municipality in the Honduran department of Intibucá.

Santa Lucía is nestled in a valley along the San Juan river, in the remote mountains of the province of Intibucá. It is one of the poorest towns in the province, though in recent years there have been marked improvements in infrastructure and civil services.

== Demographics ==
At the time of the 2013 Honduras census, Santa Lucía municipality had a population of 5,239. Of these, 97.39% were Mestizo, 2.03% White, 0.29% Indigenous and 0.29% Black or Afro-Honduran.

== Recent developments ==
In the 1990s, the University of Cincinnati and the non-profit Shoulder to Shoulder sponsored a building program for a clinical complex on the northeastern edge of the town. This is the only healthcare provider for an area comprising 10 other villages, and features several clinical offices, a small pharmacy, and a dental suite. A small full-time staff is onsite year round, and UC and other schools supply brigades of medical students and other volunteers to perform free clinic work and preventative medicine for the people of Santa Lucía.
