= Intibucá, Intibucá =

Intibucá La ciudad del manto blanco
- Municipality
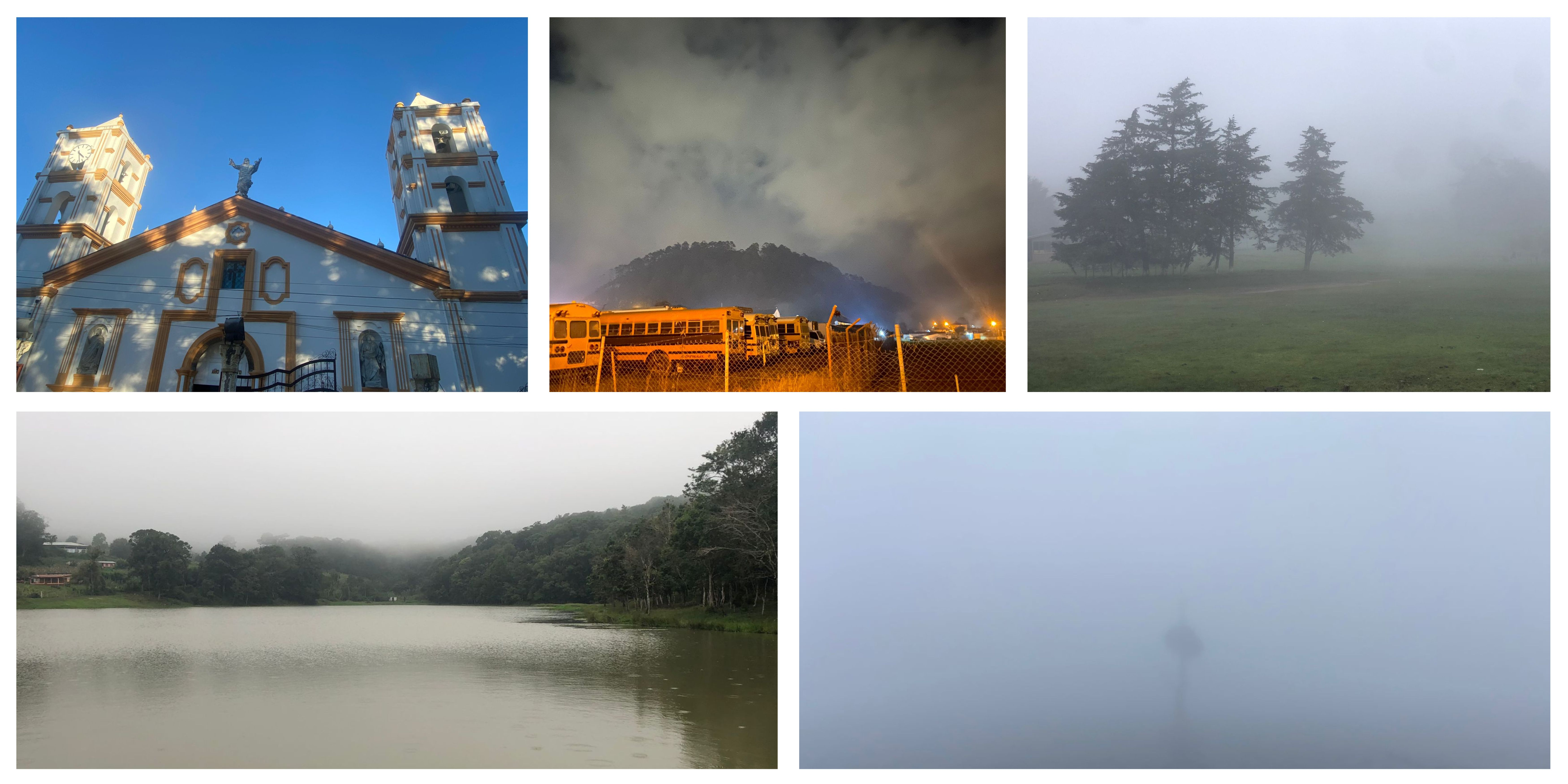

- Location within Honduras
- Coordinates: 14°19′24.37″N 88°11′5.31″W
- Country: Honduras
- Department: Intibucá
- Head of parish: 1791
- Municipality of Gracias: 1866
- Municipality of Intibuca: 1883

Government
  - Type: Democratic Municipality
  - Mayor: Javier Eusebio Martínez Ramos (PNH)

Area
  - Total: 531 km^{2} (205 sq mi)
- Elevation: 1,700 m (5,600 ft)

Population (2023 projection)
  - Total: 70,092
  - Density: 132/km^{2} (342/sq mi)
- Time zone: UTC-6 (Central America)
- Postal code: 14000
- Municipality number: 1006
- Climate: Cfb

Intibucá (Spanish pronunciation: [ĩntiβuˈka]) is a city, with a population of 28,220 (2023 calculation), and a municipality in the department of Intibucá, Honduras. The urban area of Intibucá is an important transit and commercial site in the South-West region of Honduras. Located 1,850 meters above sea level, Intibucá has a cool and often foggy climate, hence the nickname "La ciudad del manto blanco" (the city of the white mantle). Potato production, celebrated by the annual Festival de la Papa (Potato Festival), is the principal basis of the economy for the municipality.

The city of Intibucá is merged indistinguishably with the city of La Esperanza, the head of the neighboring municipality of La Esperanza and capital of the department. Intibucá is the older of the twin cities and was originally an indigenous Lenca community, while La Esperanza is the newer ladino community. Although the two cities have separate municipal governments, they are often referred to jointly as La Esperanza as they are only separated by a city street that crosses the city. Residents of Intibucá are traditionally referred to as intibucanos and residents of La Esperanza as esperanzanos.

== Location ==
The municipality borders to the north with the municipalities of San Francisco de Ojuera and San Pedro Zacapa, to the south with the municipalities of Marcala and La Esperanza, to the east with the municipalities of Masaguara and Jesús de Otoro and to the west with the municipalities of Yamaranguila and La Esperanza.

The cities of La Esperanza and Intibucá are located on a flat area in the center of the Opalaca Mountain Range. Stratigraphic samples contain limes, clays, sand, gravel and remains of vegetation, indicating that a lake existed in the past. Many wet or swampy areas along with water in the upper layers of the subsoil provide evidence of the transition from a lake bed.

== Demographics ==
At the time of the 2013 Honduras census, Intibucá municipality had a population of 56,017. Of these, 76.90% were Indigenous (76.64% Lenca), 20.15% Mestizo, 2.02% White, 0.75% Afro-Honduran or Black and 0.19% others.

== History ==
The region was occupied by indigenous peoples since the Archaic Period. Pre-Columbian peoples mined obsidian deposits in the area, which was crafted into artifacts and traded among groups in Mesoamerica as early as 1,000 BC. Obsidian was an object of trade throughout Honduras from at least 700 to 900 BC, and trace analyses have identified La Esperanza obsidian from between 800 and 400 BC. At the time of the Spanish conquest, the region was populated predominantly by Lencas, whose origin is still a source of ongoing debate among anthropologists and historians. Although the Lencas in the region accepted the language and religion imposed on them by the Spanish, they retained many elements of their pre-Hispanic culture, including agrarian and domestic rituals, myths, beliefs and other cultural elements that define Lencas as a distinct ethnic group. The indigenous Lenca in Intibuca maintained the Auxíliaria de la Vara Alta (Auxiliary of the High Majesty), which was the pre-Hispanic political and religious organization of the Lencas. The Auxíliaria de la Vara Alta collected and maintained common food supplies, collected taxes, oversaw land titles, and generally maintained the validity and respect of traditional culture.

Before the Spanish conquest, there were two towns in this region, Lentercali and Eramani, while name Intibucá appeared in a report made in 1582 by the governor Alonso de Contreras Guevara of Honduras. The Spanish crown appointed Francisco de Cerdá mayor to govern and settle disputes among the indigenous people of the region. In a document dated 10 November 1647, he delimited the municipality of Intibucá to include villages with names of the Lenca dialect. In the population count of 1791 Intibucá was already the head of the parish. It was categorized as a village on 22 September 1848. In 1866 during the administration of president José María Medina it was designated a municipality of the department of Gracias (renamed Lempira in 1943). In 1883 it became a municipality in the new department of Intibucá.

The territories of the municipalities of Intibucá and La Esperanza resemble the earlier territories of the towns of Lentercali and Eramani, respectively, except that parts of what were Lentercali are now within La Esperanza. Ladino merchants and ranchers came from Comayagua and other Honduran towns, Guatemala, and El Salvador and bought and appropriated lands from the indigenous residents of Eramani. The settlers founded La Esperanza, which was converted into the capital of Intibucá when the department was created in 1883. Rivalries arose over land and religion between the Lenca residents of Intibucá and the ladino residents of La Esperanza. Rather than fight with their neighbors, the Lencas abandoned buildings in the town center, including their church, the first and oldest of the region constructed in 1790, and their cemetery. These are now located within the border of La Esperanza, so residents of Intibucá cross over into La Esperanza to attend church and bury their deceased relatives. Residents of Intibucá also share the central park, Parque López, which is now also located in La Esperanza.

Residents of Intibucá are still predominantly Lenca although the names of the villages were changed during the colonial period to names of Catholic saints. The organizational structure of the Auxiliaria de la Vara Alta, while lost elsewhere in the region, was retained into the 20th century in the municipalities of Intibucá and Yamaranguila. As the Auxiliaria lost political power, it gained importance in religious and cultural rituals. Particularly important among these was the Guancasco that celebrates relationships among villages on 2 February. In this celebration, the patron saint, in Intibucá La Virgen de Candelaria, is carried to alternating villages in succeeding years. The presence of Catholic characteristics in this celebration is due to the Church's effort to give a religious aspect to an event that was so important for the indigenous people. The use of rods, masks, flags, and music of drums and chirimía provide ancient symbols from antiquity that after a long fight agreement was reached to bring peace.

== Climate ==
The climate is determined by its tropical position, height, relief and distance from the city to the sea. Intibucá and La Esperanza have an oceanic subtropical highland climate. (Köppen: Cfb) bordering a subtropical highland climate. (Köppen: Cwb), typical of cities located at high altitude. It is characterized by having pleasant temperatures, even cold by Honduran measures. The annual difference between the coldest month (December) and the warmest month (April) is 5 °C. The climate is favorable for the cultivation of potatoes, strawberries, blackberries, peaches, and vegetables in general.

Intibucá has only two poorly defined seasons, one wet and one dry, but for the inhabitants there are three. The first season is the hot season that goes from the month of March to the month of May, with high temperatures, which often exceed 25 °C. The inhabitants refer to this as summer. After this, comes a monsoon season, also called "the hurricane season", which is characterized by high levels of humidity, thunderstorms, short torrential rainfalls, sometimes with hail. This goes from July to October. And finally the cold dry season, referred to as winter. This runs from November to February, with freezing temperatures during the night and a cool climate during the day. Rains during this period are usually mild and fall in the form of showers. Thick fogs often form at this time. The temperature is lower, depending on altitude, varying between 2 or 4 degrees °C from lower to higher elevations of the municipality. The temperature range during the winter season is from 20 °C to 10 °C, during the summer season from 25 °C to 12 °C and in the rainy season from 23 °C to 15 °C. The annual average of the climate is 16.4 °C.

As for its rainfall, the city is determined by the two dry and wet seasons. Precipitation is influenced by the tropical monsoon. The dry season is from November to April, February being the month with the least rainfall with an average rainfall of 12 mm, while the wet season is from May to October, September being the most rainy with an average rainfall of 316 mm. The average annual rainfall is 1548 mm and the average annual humidity is 75%.

Climate data for La Esperanza, Honduras (1989-2024)
Month	Jan	Feb	Mar	Apr	May	Jun	Jul	Aug	Sep	Oct	Nov	Dec	Year
Record high °C (°F)	36.6 (97.9)	33.0 (91.4)	31.7 (89.1)	32.0 (89.6)	31.0 (87.8)	34.0 (93.2)	32.0 (89.6)	32.8 (91.0)	31.0 (87.8)	29.0 (84.2)	33.0 (91.4)	29.6 (85.3)	36.6 (97.9)
Mean daily maximum °C (°F)	21.5 (70.7)	23.1 (73.6)	24.6 (76.3)	25.6 (78.1)	24.9 (76.8)	24.1 (75.4)	23.7 (74.7)	24.0 (75.2)	24.0 (75.2)	22.6 (72.7)	21.3 (70.3)	21.1 (70.0)	23.4 (74.1)
Daily mean °C (°F)	15.9 (60.6)	16.8 (62.2)	17.9 (64.2)	19.1 (66.4)	19.5 (67.1)	19.1 (66.4)	18.8 (65.8)	19.0 (66.2)	19.0 (66.2)	18.3 (64.9)	17.0 (62.6)	16.1 (61.0)	18.0 (64.5)
Mean daily minimum °C (°F)	10.5 (50.9)	10.5 (50.9)	11.2 (52.2)	12.6 (54.7)	14.0 (57.2)	14.1 (57.4)	13.9 (57.0)	13.9 (57.0)	14.1 (57.4)	13.9 (57.0)	12.7 (54.9)	11.2 (52.2)	12.7 (54.9)
Record low °C (°F)	1.0 (33.8)	−0.3 (31.5)	1.5 (34.7)	5.0 (41.0)	6.5 (43.7)	7.0 (44.6)	8.4 (47.1)	8.5 (47.3)	9.2 (48.6)	7.8 (46.0)	3.7 (38.7)	0.5 (32.9)	−0.3 (31.5)
Average precipitation mm (inches)	13.2 (0.52)	10.8 (0.43)	12.4 (0.49)	60.2 (2.37)	114.4 (4.50)	118.1 (4.65)	122.2 (4.81)	155.3 (6.11)	125.9 (4.96)	123.6 (4.87)	129.4 (5.09)	79.3 (3.12)	1,064.8 (41.92)
Average precipitation days (≥ 1.0 mm)	1.0	1.1	1.3	3.7	9.2	14.1	10.4	12.2	15.4	10.7	4.4	1.6	85.2
Source: NOAA

== Population Centers ==
The municipality has 20 villages (aldeas) and 127 hamlets (caseríos). The urban area consists of 19 neighborhoods (barrios).

=== Villages ===
The following lists the 20 villages.

- Intibucá
- Azacualpa
- El Naranjo
- El Pelón de Ologosí
- El Rodeo
- La Laguna de Chiligatoro
- La Sorto
- Malguara
- Manazapa
- Mixcure
- Monquecagua
- Pueblo Viejo
- Quebrada Honda
- Río Blanco
- Río Colorado
- Río Grande o El Nance
- San José
- San Nicolás
- San Pedro
- Santa Catarina
- Togopala
