= San Marcos de la Sierra =

- Municipality
- Location in Honduras
- Coordinates: 14°7′N 88°15′W
- Country: Honduras
- Department: Intibucá

Area
  - Total: 144 km^{2} (56 sq mi)

Population (2015)
  - Total: 8,960
  - Density: 62.2/km^{2} (161/sq mi)
- Postal code: 14000
- Municipality number: 1013

San Marcos de la Sierra is a municipality in the Honduran department of Intibucá.

== Demographics ==
At the time of the 2013 Honduras census, San Marcos de la Sierra municipality had a population of 8,653. Of these, 91.86% were Indigenous (91.74% Lenca), 7.96% Mestizo, 0.16% Black or Afro-Honduran and 0.02% White.
