= Colomoncagua =

- Location within Honduras
- Coordinates: 13°57′N 88°17′W
- Country: Honduras
- Department: Intibucá

Area
  - Total: 181.42 km^{2} (70.05 sq mi)

Population (2015)
  - Total: 18,484
  - Density: 101.89/km^{2} (263.88/sq mi)
- Postal code: 14000
- Municipality number: 1003

Colomoncagua (Spanish pronunciation: [kolomoŋˈkaɣwa]) is a municipality in the Honduran department of Intibucá.

The municipality is known for its natural reserves. It is a safe place known for its hospitable residents. There is great meaning behind the name Colomoncagua, it refers to hills surrounded by water. Colomoncagua is surrounded by a vast expansion of pine trees. The climate is quite favorable year round. There are various tourist attractions as well, such as Chorreron Waterfall, La Piedra del Almanaque, El Cerro El Pelon, etc. Year round there are various cultural festivities. Colomoncagua is also known for its coffee and apples.

== Demographics ==
At the time of the 2013 Honduras census, Colomoncagua municipality had a population of 18,214. Of these, 97.07% were Mestizo, 1.87% Indigenous (1.75% Lenca), 0.96% White and 0.11% Afro-Honduran or Black.
