= Masaguara =

- Municipality
- Location in Honduras
- Coordinates: 14°22′N 87°59′W
- Country: Honduras
- Department: Intibucá

Area
  - Total: 254 km^{2} (98 sq mi)

Population (2015)
  - Total: 16,336
  - Density: 64.3/km^{2} (167/sq mi)
- Postal code: 14000
- Municipality number: 1009

Masaguara (Spanish pronunciation: [masaˈɣwaɾa]) is a municipality in the Honduran department of Intibucá.

== Demographics ==
At the time of the 2013 Honduras census, Masaguara municipality had a population of 15,892. Of these, 88.16% were Mestizo, 9.87% Indigenous (9.65% Lenca), 1.72% White, 0.23% Black or Afro-Honduran and 0.02% others.
