= San Juan, Intibucá =

San Juan
- Municipality
- Location in Honduras
- Coordinates: 14°24′N 88°25′W
- Country: Honduras
- Department: Intibucá
- Founded: 1747

Area
  - Total: 177 km^{2} (68 sq mi)

Population (2015)
  - Total: 13,887
  - Density: 78.5/km^{2} (203/sq mi)
- Postal code: 14000
- Municipality number: 1012

San Juan, Intibucá lies in the western highlands of Honduras between Gracias and La Esperanza.

It is located in the department of Intibucá, was founded in 1747 by the Spanish, and has a population of around 1000. San Juan lies in the center of the "Lenca Trail" which runs from Santa Rosa de Copan to Marcala, La Paz. There are still many Lenca groups in the areas surrounding the village center. There is an old Catholic Church built by the Spanish in the town's center next to a massive ceibo tree. The primary source of income for community members comes from the numerous coffee farms that can be found throughout the region. The main coffee cooperatives are FUNDECASA producing Rainforest Alliance Coffee and COARENE producing Fairtrade and organic coffee. Ecotourism is also becoming popular in and around San Juan - a thermal spring outside of San Juan has been developed for tourist use.

The Opalaca Biological Reserve is located in the area and a number of creeks flow through the valley. Due to the attractions in the area, a community group of leaders have established the first Rural Tourism Cooperative in the country, offering packages for tourists wanting to see "the Real Honduras". This is a rural community with natural attractions such as waterfalls, cloud forests, and canyons. The cooperative consists of a group of guides, comedores (cafeterias), guest house owners, horse owners, site owners, and a visitor center. Guided tours are offered on horseback and community members have also been trained to give coffee roasting demonstrations, local artisan workshops, and sugar cane production demonstrations.

There are buses leaving Gracias and La Esperanza on a daily basis for San Juan. There are Moto-taxis transporting tourists and locals around the village. Some tourists prefer to hitchhike between the towns, which is the standard mode or transportation in the region.

== Demographics ==
At the time of the 2013 Honduras census, San Juan municipality had a population of 13,405. Of these, 66.78% were Mestizo, 27.00% Indigenous (24.67% Lenca, 2.30% Chʼortiʼ) 4.61% White, 1.58% Black or Afro-Honduran and 0.03% others.
