= Rafael Manzanares Aguilar =

- Born: July 17, 1918; La Esperanza, Honduras
- Died: July 28, 1999 (aged 81); Tegucigalpa, Honduras
- Education: Primary Education, Escuela Normal de Occidente in La Esperanza; Jurisprudence, Universidad Nacional Autónoma de Honduras, Tegucigalpa
- Occupations: Ethnographer, folklorist, author, and composer
- Employer(s): Ministry of Public Education, Tegucigalpa
- Known for: Recorded, preserved, and restored traditional Honduran music and dance.
- Title: Director of the Cuadro Nacional de Danzas Folklóricas de Honduras
- Parent(s): Santiago Manzanares and María de los Ángeles Aguilar

Rafael Manzanares Aguilar (July 17, 1918 – August 28, 1999) was educated in law, and a professor and Honduran folklorist, an author and a musical composer. Rafael Manzanares was one of the pioneers in highlighting folklore, culture and national history of Honduras as the creator of the National Folklore Office and the Cuadro Nacional de Danzas Folklóricas de Honduras. (Note: Cuadro Nacional de Danza Folklóricas de Honduras roughly translates to National Team of Folkloric Dances of Honduras.)

== Childhood and education ==
Rafael Manzanares was born on July 17, 1918, in La Esperanza, Intibucá, the son of Mr. Santiago Manzanares and Mrs. Maria de los Angeles Aguilar. He spent his early life in La Esperanza and graduated from the Escuela Normal de Occidente in La Esperanza with a degree in primary education. He then moved to Tegucigalpa to continue his studies at the Central University, from which he obtained a degree in law at the Universidad Nacional Autónoma de Honduras.

== Career ==
Rafael Manzanares began his professional career in the 1940s as a teacher and marimba player with the Orquesta Tropical de Antonio Medina (Antonio Medina's Tropical Orchestra). Rafael Manzanares was initially appointed as secretary of the board of the Central District. He subsequently became director general of Culture and the Ministry of Culture and Tourism of Honduras. In this position, Manzanares Aguilar studied music and committed himself to investigate the origins of Honduran music and dance. His investigations took him to numerous regions of Honduras, visiting Honduran communities to study and record traditional music, dance, and customs in the towns and villages of Honduras. This work earned him recognition from the government and provided inspiration for founding the institutions that are today paramount in Honduran folklore.

Rafael Manzanares founded and was the first director of the National Office of Folklore under the Ministry of Public Education. In this capacity he is credited with founding the national dance company, El Cuadro Nacional de Danzas Folklóricas de Honduras on November 1, 1956. He was the first director and choreographer of the new dance company. This was the first artistic group dedicated to the folklore and traditions of Honduras. The group from then until now works to rescue, preserve, disseminate and promote Honduran folk dance. At present El Cuadro Nacional de Danzas Folklóricas de Honduras is composed of about 11 employees in the Ministry of Culture, Arts and Sport (SCAD), and from them its influence spreads over 500 groups in different regions with more than 1,000 instructors nationwide who work to preserve the cultural roots of Honduras. This initiative now includes 50 schools in the capital and more than 700 in the entire country.

Rafael Manzanares is remembered in Honduras as a composer. He is the author of the lyrics and music of themes such as Conozca Honduras, which describes the country and its people, Ciudad de San Pedro Sula, Ciudad de La Esperanza, Ojojona, Danlí, among others. Many of his romantic titles have been recorded and disseminated throughout Central America.

Rafael Manzanares is particularly noted for investigating folk dances in the communities in which they originated and recording the dress, music and choreography. A typical folk dance with a jocular character is El Zopilote, inspired by flying and walking characteristics of the buzzard, commonly seen in Honduras. This dance was compiled by Professor Manzanares in the city of Yuscarán, department of El Paraiso, and it was choreographed and initially interpreted by the Cuadro Nacional de Danzas Folklóricas.

In 1997 Rafael Manzanares was the Liberal Party mayoral candidate for Tegucigalpa, in an election that he lost to the National Party Candidate, Doctor Cesar Castellanos Madrid. In 1998, during the presidential administration of Carlos Roberto Flores, he was appointed minister of the Secretary of State for Culture, Arts and Sports. Rafael Manzanares was also a commentator for HRN radio.

== Published works ==
- "Conozca a Honduras" (Instructional songbook authored and composed by Rafael Manzanares)
- "Por las sendas del folklore"
- "Fulgores de Nacionalidad"
- "Desarrollo de la música en Honduras"
- "El Folclore Hondureño" (Published by the Organization of American States O.A.E.)
- "El folklore en Honduras: Concepto"

== Collected dances ==
Rafael Manzanares in his ethnographic field work documented many different traditional dances from villages and towns of Honduras. Included among these are the following dances archived by the National Office of Folklore of Honduras (Oficina del Folklore Nacional de Honduras):

Dance	Category	Region	Sample
El Barreño	Creole	Lodo Colorado, Santa Rosa de Copán, Copán	* Arte UNAH
Los Caballitos	Creole Imitation	Yoro, Yoro	* Ballet Folklórico de Honduras Oro Lenca
La Cadena	Indigenous	Olanchito, Yoro	* El IJAP en Ia Villa Olimpica * Las Lajas (2012)
El Callado	Colonial	San Francisco, San Marcos de Colon, Choluteca	* Grupo Folklórico Gualala, Encuentro Folklórico Zope Rey
La Correa	Creole	Cacaurtare, municipio de Pespire, Choluteca	* Azacualpa Danza La Correa * Instituto San José, Progresso
La Coyota	Creole Imitation	La Esperanza, Intibucá	
Las Escobas	Indigenous	Santa María, La Paz	* Ballet Folklorico Sampedrano Sectur * Grupo Folklórico Lentercala
El Guapango Chorotega	Creole	Linaca, Choluteca	* Ballet Folklórico de Honduras Oro Lenca (2017) * Universidad Pedagógica Nacional Francisco Morazán (2014)
El Jarabe Yoreño	Colonial	Victoria, Yoro	* Leon Alvarado (2012)
El Jutiquile	Creole	Jutikile, Olancho, Olancho	* Danzas Folkloricas ARTE-UNAH
Mazurka	Colonial	Tegucigalpa	* Instituto Católico San Jose de El Progreso, Yoro * Instituto Técnico Federico C. Canales
El Pereke	Colonial	Santa Teresa, El Triunfo, Choluteca	* Grupo Jade * IJAP Egresados (2014)
El Revuelto	Creole	Linaca, Choluteca	* Grupo Folklorico Azacualpa
Sos un Ángel	Indigenous	Olanchito, Yoro	* Sos un Ángel * Centro Escolar Alberto Masferrer
El Sueñito	Indigenous	Cacautare, Pespire, Choluteca	* Ballet Folklórico de Honduras Oro Lenca (2014) * Grupo de Proyeccioón Folklórica Zorzales de Sula con Marimba Usula Internacional
El Torito Pinto	Creole Imitation	La Esperanza, Intibucá; Alianza, Valle	* UNAH
La Tusa	Indigenous	Cantarranas (now San Juan de Flores), Francisco Morazán	* El Grande de Grandes (2015)
El Xixique	Indigenous	Cacautare, Municipio de Pespire, Choluteca	* El Instituto Doctora Jesus Aquilar Paz (2016)
El Zapateado (Dance of the Machetes)	Creole	San Martín, Choluteca	* Festival Regional Zona Norte * Competencia Nacional * Inst. Perla del Ulúa, Progresso
El Zopilote	Creole Imitation	Yuscarán, El Paraíso.	* instituto Leon Alvarado de Comayagua (2010) * El Zopilote

== Awards and recognition ==
The following are some of the many awards and recognitions bestowed on Rafael Manzanares Aguilar.

- Pablo Zelaya Sierra National Art Award for 1970
- Diploma of Recognition from the Honduran section of the Pan American Round Table, Rafael Aguilar Manzanares as the 1964 Folklorist of the Year on July 20, 1964
- Diploma of Honorable Merit awarded by the International Spring Fair committee, in Guatemala on September 10, 1959
- Diploma of Honorable Merit awarded by the Folklore Society of Guatemala in September 1962
- Diploma and key to the city awarded by the Mayor of New Orleans, declaring Rafael Manzanares, Honorary Citizen of the City of New Orleans on October 12, 1973.
- Invitational in his honor by the United States Department of State
- Posthumous (July 23, 2013) declaration of La Esperanza as the National Capital of Honduran Folklore and designation of the last Saturday of July (Note: The national dance festival El Grande de Grandes was designated to occur on the last Saturday of July. It now occurs on the last Saturday in October to accommodate other festivals that occur earlier in the calendar as well as the performance and practice schedules of the participant and host dance groups.) for the national dance festival El Grande de Grandes in honor of Rafael Manzanares

== See also ==
- Baile Folklórico
- Culture of Honduras
- Escuela Nacional de Bellas Artes (Honduras)
- Folklore of Honduras
- List of folk dance performance groups
- La Esperanza, Honduras
- Music of Honduras
