= San Antonio, Intibucá =

San Antonio
- Municipality
- Location in Honduras
- Coordinates: 13°58′N 88°29′W
- Country: Honduras
- Department: Intibucá

Area
  - Total: 91 km^{2} (35 sq mi)

Population (2015)
  - Total: 5,572
  - Density: 61/km^{2} (160/sq mi)
- Postal code: 14000
- Municipality number: 1010

San Antonio is a municipality in the Honduran department of Intibucá.

== Demographics ==
At the time of the 2013 Honduras census, San Antonio municipality had a population of 5,492. Of these, 72.67% were Mestizo, 18.07% Indigenous (17.99% Lenca), 5.30% White, 2.90% Black or Afro-Honduran and 1.06% others.
