= Dolores, Intibucá =

Dolores
- Municipality
- Location in Honduras
- Coordinates: 14°14′N 88°21′W
- Country: Honduras
- Department: Intibucá

Area
  - Total: 82.66 km^{2} (31.92 sq mi)

Population (2015)
  - Total: 5,332
  - Density: 64.51/km^{2} (167.1/sq mi)
- Postal code: 14000
- Municipality number: 1005

Dolores is a municipality in the Honduran department of Intibucá.

== Demographics ==
At the time of the 2013 Honduras census, Dolores municipality had a population of 5,140. Of these, 85.70% were Indigenous (85.56% Lenca), 9.48% Mestizo, 3.53% White, 1.26% Afro-Honduran or Black and 0.02% others.
