= Camasca =

- Location within Honduras
- Coordinates: 14°00′N 88°23′W
- Country: Honduras
- Department: Intibucá

Area
  - Total: 68.33 km^{2} (26.38 sq mi)

Population (2015)
  - Total: 6,873
  - Density: 100.6/km^{2} (260.5/sq mi)
- Postal code: 14000
- Municipality number: 1002

Camasca is a municipality in the Honduran department of Intibucá.

== Demographics ==
At the time of the 2013 Honduras census, Camasca municipality had a population of 6,781. Of these, 94.41% were Indigenous (93.88% Lenca), 5.28% Mestizo, 0.25% Afro-Honduran or Black, 0.01% White and 0.04% others.
