= La Esperanza, Honduras =

La Esperanza
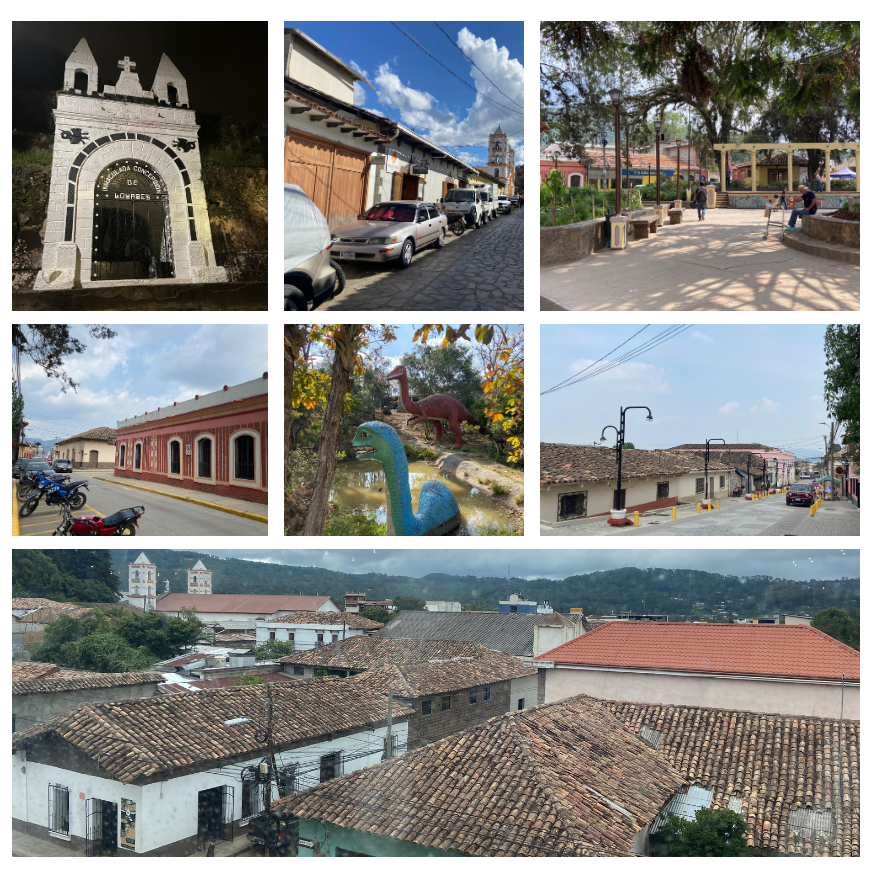
- Nickname: La Esperansita
- Location within Honduras
- Coordinates: 14°18′23.90″N 88°10′43.21″W
- Country: Honduras
- Department: Intibucá
- Founded: 22 September 1848; 178 years ago
- City and Municipality: 1883

Government
  - Type: Democratic Municipality
  - Mayor: Miguel Antonio Fajardo Mejía (PNH)

Area
  - Total: 157.2 km^{2} (60.7 sq mi)
- Elevation: 1,800 m (5,900 ft)

Population (2016)
  - Total: 12,955
  - Density: 82.41/km^{2} (213.4/sq mi)
- Time zone: UTC-6 (Central America)
- Postal code: 14101
- Municipality number: 1001
- Climate: Cfb
- Website: Official web page (possibly abandoned)

La Esperanza (Spanish pronunciation: [la espeˈɾansa]) is the capital city and a municipality of the same name of the department of Intibucá, Honduras. La Esperanza is famous for having the coolest climate in Honduras. It is considered the heart of the Ruta Lenca (Lenca Trail), a region of Lenca ethnic influence that spans Honduras from Santa Rosa de Copan to Choluteca. Sites on the Lenca Trail have been designated by the government and United Nations development in order to encourage more cultural tourism, and help create new markets for the traditional crafts, such as pottery, practiced by the Lenca, in order to preserve their culture.

The city of La Esperanza is merged indistinguishably with the city of Intibucá, the head of the neighboring municipality of Intibucá. Intibucá is the older of the twin cities and was originally an indigenous Lenca community, while La Esperanza is the newer ladino community. Although the two cities have separate municipal governments, they are often referred to jointly as La Esperanza as they are only separated by a city street that crosses the city. Residents of La Esperanza are traditionally referred to as esperanzanos and residents of Intibucá as intibucanos.

== History ==
The area was originally occupied by Maya and Lenca people from pre-Columbian times who formed two settlements called Eramani and Lentercala. In 1647, Mayor Francisco de La Cerda was appointed by the Spanish throne to officially demarcate the territory of the indigenous population. He divided the land into two jurisdictions, not corresponding to the Eramani and Lentercala sites, and created boundaries and names for the surrounding small communities.

Over time, the two jurisdictions developed a rivalry, especially over land. The cities grew in population, especially in the 1800s, and La Esperanza was named a villa on 22 September 1848. La Esperanza officially became a city in 1883 when the department of Intibucá was formed by separating from the neighbouring department of Lempira, then called Gracias.

In 2002, permits were obtained by the Consorcio de Inversiones SA de CV (CISA) to build a hydro electric dam on the Rio Intibucá over an abandoned hydro project. Called the La Esperanza Hydro Project after the city, the dam began producing electricity for the surrounding communities in 2003, but its phase two expansion was not completed until 2006. The project was the first in the world to generate Certified Emission Reductions (CERs) under the Clean Development Mechanism (CDM).

== Geography ==
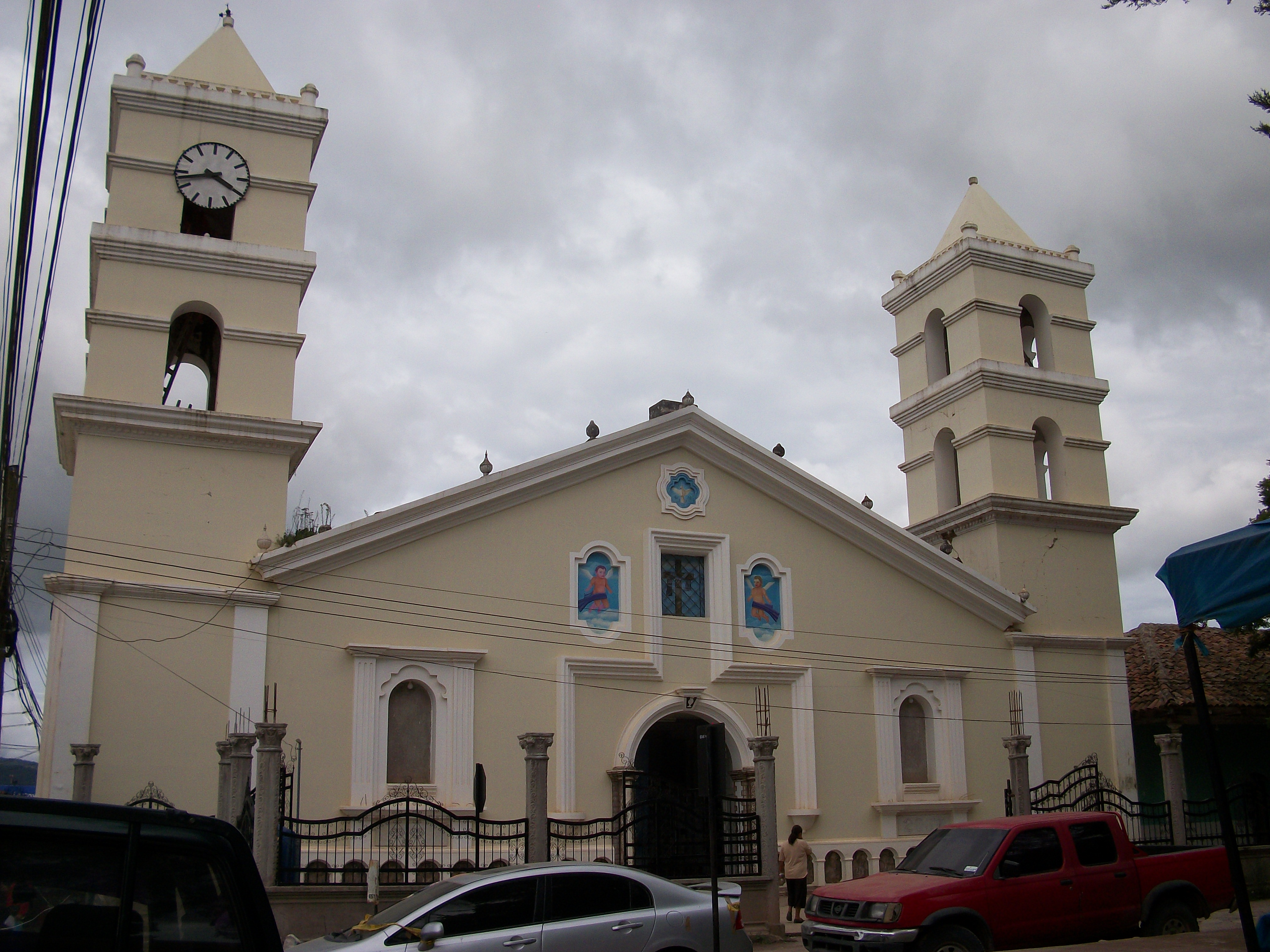
Catholic Church in the Central Park of La Esperanza

La Esperanza sits at an altitude of 1700 meters, making it the highest city in Honduras. It is bisected by the Rio Intibucá which runs from the municipality of Intibucá through the municipality of La Esperanza. La Esperanza is situated in a relatively flat mountain valley, bordered by two chains of mountains, the Sierra de Puca Opalaca to the north and Montaña Zapochoco to the Southeast. The area of the La Esperanza municipality is 138.8 km2 and Intibucá 531 km2.

La Esperanza Airport runs along the valley 2 kilometres (1.2 mi) south of the two cities.

=== Climate ===
La Esperanza have an oceanic subtropical highland climate. (Köppen: Cfb) bordering a subtropical highland climate. (Köppen: Cwb) it rains primarily in the afternoon and the intense showers often make small dirt roads into the surrounding mountain communities impassable. La Esperanza receives average annual precipitation of 939 mm. Due to its high altitude, La Esperanza has a cooler climate than most of Honduras, with an average annual temperature of 18.1 °C (64.5 °F). Temperatures in December and January often fall into the below 10 °C at night. Hail has been reported on occasion, but it has never snowed. In the summer, high temperatures reach the high 20s °C, but with low average humidity around 76%.

Climate data for La Esperanza, Honduras (1989-2024)
Month	Jan	Feb	Mar	Apr	May	Jun	Jul	Aug	Sep	Oct	Nov	Dec	Year
Record high °C (°F)	36.6 (97.9)	33.0 (91.4)	31.7 (89.1)	32.0 (89.6)	31.0 (87.8)	34.0 (93.2)	32.0 (89.6)	32.8 (91.0)	31.0 (87.8)	29.0 (84.2)	33.0 (91.4)	29.6 (85.3)	36.6 (97.9)
Mean daily maximum °C (°F)	21.5 (70.7)	23.1 (73.6)	24.6 (76.3)	25.6 (78.1)	24.9 (76.8)	24.1 (75.4)	23.7 (74.7)	24.0 (75.2)	24.0 (75.2)	22.6 (72.7)	21.3 (70.3)	21.1 (70.0)	23.4 (74.1)
Daily mean °C (°F)	16.0 (60.8)	16.8 (62.2)	17.9 (64.2)	19.1 (66.4)	19.5 (67.1)	19.1 (66.4)	18.8 (65.8)	19.0 (66.2)	19.0 (66.2)	18.3 (64.9)	17.0 (62.6)	16.1 (61.0)	18.1 (64.5)
Mean daily minimum °C (°F)	10.5 (50.9)	10.5 (50.9)	11.2 (52.2)	12.6 (54.7)	14.0 (57.2)	14.1 (57.4)	13.9 (57.0)	13.9 (57.0)	14.1 (57.4)	13.9 (57.0)	12.7 (54.9)	11.2 (52.2)	12.7 (54.9)
Record low °C (°F)	1.0 (33.8)	−0.3 (31.5)	1.5 (34.7)	5.0 (41.0)	6.5 (43.7)	7.0 (44.6)	8.4 (47.1)	8.5 (47.3)	9.2 (48.6)	7.8 (46.0)	3.7 (38.7)	0.5 (32.9)	−0.3 (31.5)
Average precipitation mm (inches)	48.6 (1.91)	39.8 (1.57)	16.4 (0.65)	36.0 (1.42)	80.4 (3.17)	120.1 (4.73)	120.0 (4.72)	140.3 (5.52)	150.9 (5.94)	123.6 (4.87)	70.4 (2.77)	69.3 (2.73)	1,015.8 (40)
Average precipitation days (≥ 1.0 mm)	3.0	3.1	2.3	3.7	9.2	18.1	20.4	20.2	18.4	17.7	17.4	15.6	149.1
Source: NOAA

== Population ==
The projected population of La Esperanza for 2018 is 13,800, with 9,900 in the urban area and 3,900 in rural areas of the municipality. Additionally, the projected population for the neighboring municipality of Intibucá of 63,000 in the municipality, including 23,800 in the urban area and 39,000 in the rural areas, translates to a population of 37,600 in the combined urban areas of La Esperanza and Intibucá.

=== Demographics ===
At the time of the 2013 Honduras census, La Esperanza municipality had a population of 11,631. Of these, 59.11% were Indigenous (58.92% Lenca), 36.91% Mestizo, 3.18% White, 0.55% Afro-Honduran or Black and 0.26% others.

=== Towns and Hamlets ===
The municipality has the following five villages (aldeas), which encompass 36 hamlets (caseríos):

- La Esperanza
  - El Terrero
  - Finca Las Terrazas o El Refugio
  - Finca San José Del Edén
  - Finca Santa Anita
  - La Laguna
  - La Pozona
  - Las Anonas
  - Lepaterique
  - San Esteban
  - Tierra Colorada
  - Los Diez Chorritos
  - Piedra Menuda
  - El Invernadero
- Chogola
  - Chogola
  - Agua Blanca
  - El Arenal
  - El Mango o Las Pilas
  - Hda. de Quiala
  - Llano de La Cruz
  - Quiala
  - Puente Hondo
  - La Sierra
- El Pelón
  - El Pelón
  - Llano Chalingua
- La Pimienta
  - La Pimienta
  - El Garrapatero
- Nueva Esperanza
  - Nueva Esperanza
  - El Pastal
  - El Pital
  - La Montaña
  - San Antonio
  - San Juan o Los Roquitos
  - San Vicente
  - Palos Blancos

== Culture ==
The predominant ethnic group are the Lenca people, who have occupied the southwest region of Honduras since pre-Columbian times. The Lenca are the largest ethnic group in Honduras, numbering just over 100,000. The Lenca once had a distinct language which is now extinct. They continue to practice traditional customs and arts, such as the production of textiles and pottery, dances, and clothing. The Lenca people, particularly women, can be recognised by their unique style of dress, including brightly coloured dresses and woven head scarves called pañuelos.

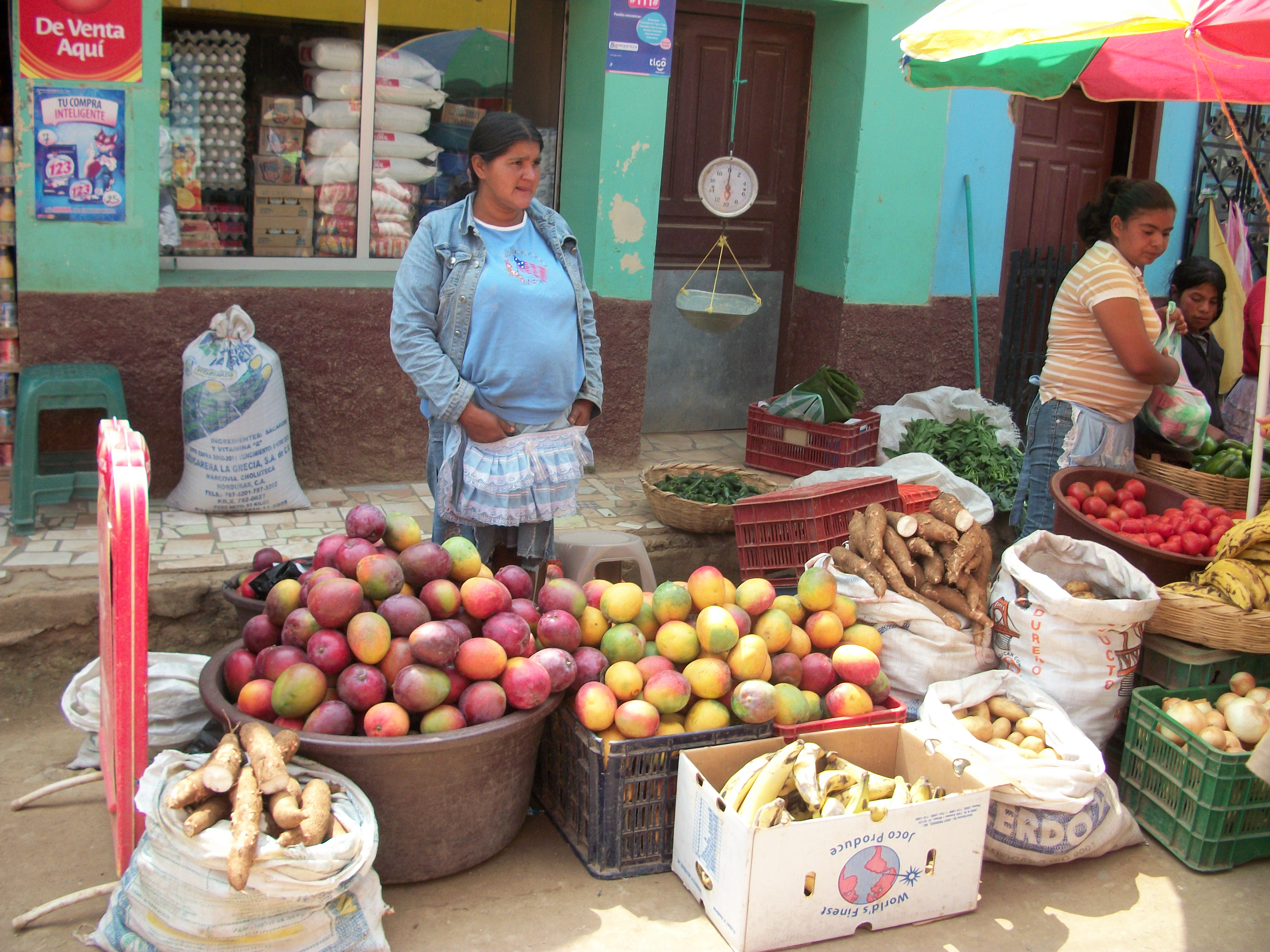
Daily Lenca fresh produce market

Life in La Esperanza and Intibucá is centred primarily on agriculture, which is the mainstay of most residents, especially the Lenca. Due to its uniquely cool climate, the department is able to produce products that other departments cannot, including potatoes, strawberries and apples. La Esperanza is famous for its daily farmers market which draws vendors and shoppers from around the department. Lenca farmers arrive from the surrounding communities and sell their fruits and vegetables in the street, while some La Esperanza residents manage permanent wooden stalls. Produce available includes lettuce, spinach, carrots, cucumbers, broccoli, cauliflower, cabbage, potatoes, tomatoes, sweet and hot peppers, yucca, onions, cilantro, apples, blackberries, mangoes, pineapple, bananas, platanos, avocadoes, grapes, peaches and strawberries. The busiest market days are Saturday and Sunday.

=== Celebrations ===
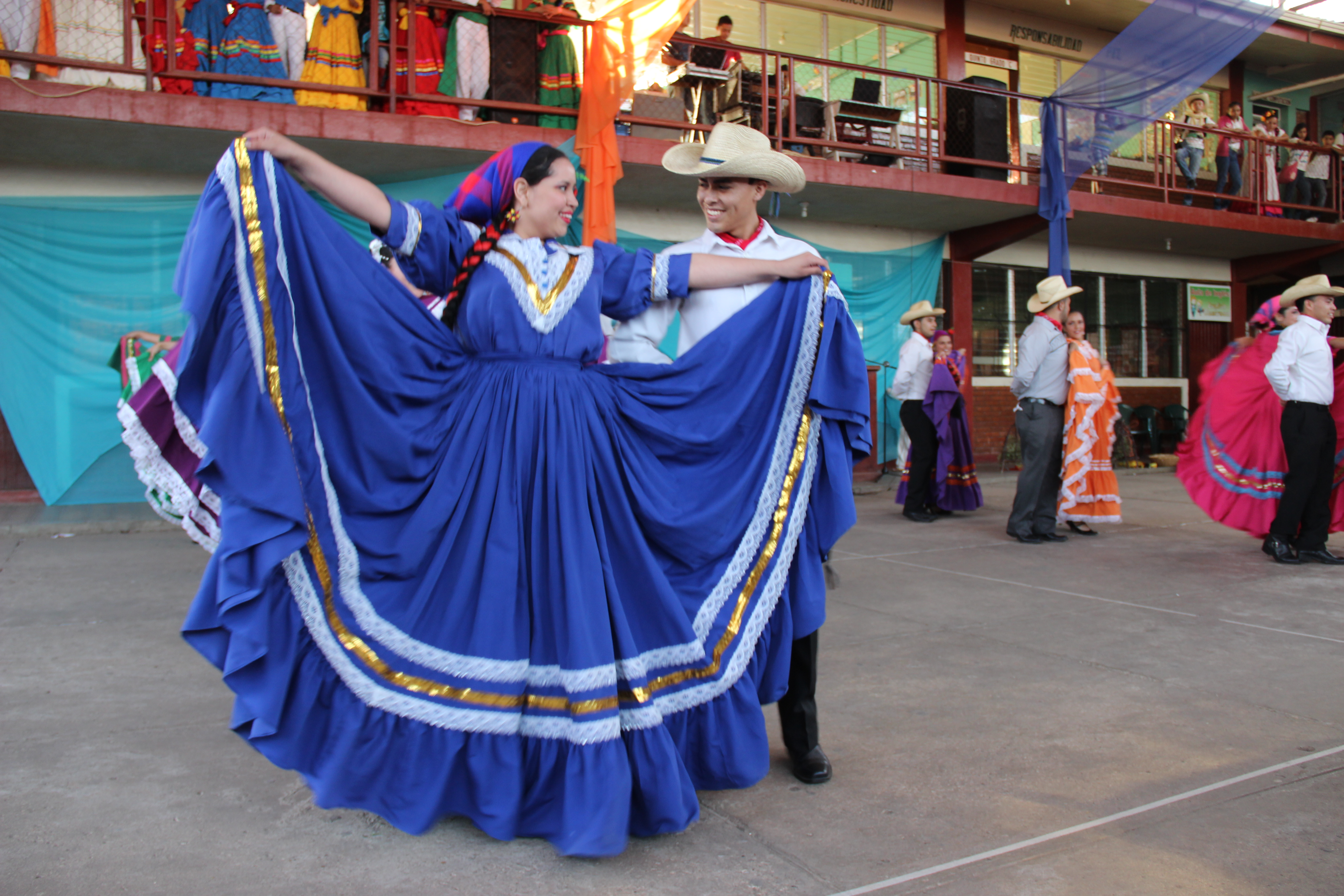
Dancers in the national dance festival, El Grande de Grandes

As in the rest of Honduras, the majority of the population is Roman Catholic, with a growing percentage of Evangelicals. As such, Christmastime or Navidad, and Holy Week preceding Easter, called Semana Santa, are major times of celebration. Christmas Eve, known as Nochebuena, is celebrated with a late-night dinner with family and friends followed by lighting fireworks at midnight.

For Holy Week, there is generally a series of processions and activities related to each day. Good Friday, Viernes Santo has the largest procession in a re-enactment of Christ's journey to the cross. The people create alfombras along the path of the procession, designed carpets on the street made of coloured sawdust. Most businesses are closed Thursday (Maundy Thursday) and Friday of Holy Week, which are national holidays.

In addition to Christmas and Easter, the people celebrate several other annual festivals and holidays, including:

- Artisan Festival (Feria de Artesanía de La Ruta Lenca) – February
- Anniversary of the Department of Intibucá – 16 April
- National Mushroom and Wine Festival (Festival Nacional del Choro y el Vino) – June or July
- Potato Festival (Feria de La Papa) – July
- El Grande de Grandes (International traditional dance competition) – the last Saturday in October (Note: The national dance festival El Grande de Grandes was initially designated to occur on the last Saturday of July but now occurs on the last Saturday of October to accommodate the performance and practice schedule of the Ballet Folklórico Oro Lenca, whose members host the event.)
- Independence from Spain (Día de Independencia) – 15 September
- Festival of the Patron Saint, Virgin of Conception (Feria Patronal de la Virgen de Concepcion) – 29 November to 7 December

Festivals may include parades, processions, marching bands, food tents, artisan demonstrations, traditional dancing, live music and fireworks.

=== Artisan products ===
Local people make a variety of skilled handicrafts. Many women's groups use hand-constructed wooden looms to produce traditional Lenca woven textiles such as ponchos, scarves, shawls, head scarves, table runners and tablecloths in bright colours. A growing number of groups have begun to take advantage of the ample number of fallen pine needles from the surrounding forests, which they weave into sturdy and decorative baskets, pot holders, and vases. White clay local to the region is used to produce a variety of unique ceramic items. La Esperanza is well known for the production of sweet, liqueur-like wines from fruits such as strawberries, pears, peaches, blackberries, and apples as well as the local favourite, potatoes. Visitors to La Esperanza can purchase these items and many other artisan products from around Honduras at one of the three primary souvenir stores in town, UMMIL (Union de Mujeres Microempresarias Lencas de Intibuca), Opalacas, and El Rincon del Turista.

=== National Capital of Honduran Folklore ===
On 23 July 2013 La Esperanza was declared the national capital of Honduran folklore, in tribute to the folklorist and native son of La Esperanza, Rafael Manzanares Aguilar. Rafael Manzanares was a Honduran folklorist, author and musical composer. He created the Cuadro Nacional De Danzas Folklóricas de Honduras and was instrumental in the revival of folklore traditions in Honduras.

The designation of the capital of Honduran folklore is realised in La Esperanza each year by the folklore festival El Grande de Grandes. Folk dance groups from all parts of Honduras present their regional dances and costumes while competing in this all-day festival.

== Tourism ==
La Esperanza is located on the route between Tegucigalpa and Western Honduras, making it a convenient place for stopping while traveling in the country. It is a designated site of the Ruta Lenca. La Esperanza/Intibucá has plenty of hotels, restaurant and shops in every price range.

Some sites of interest in and around La Esperanza include:

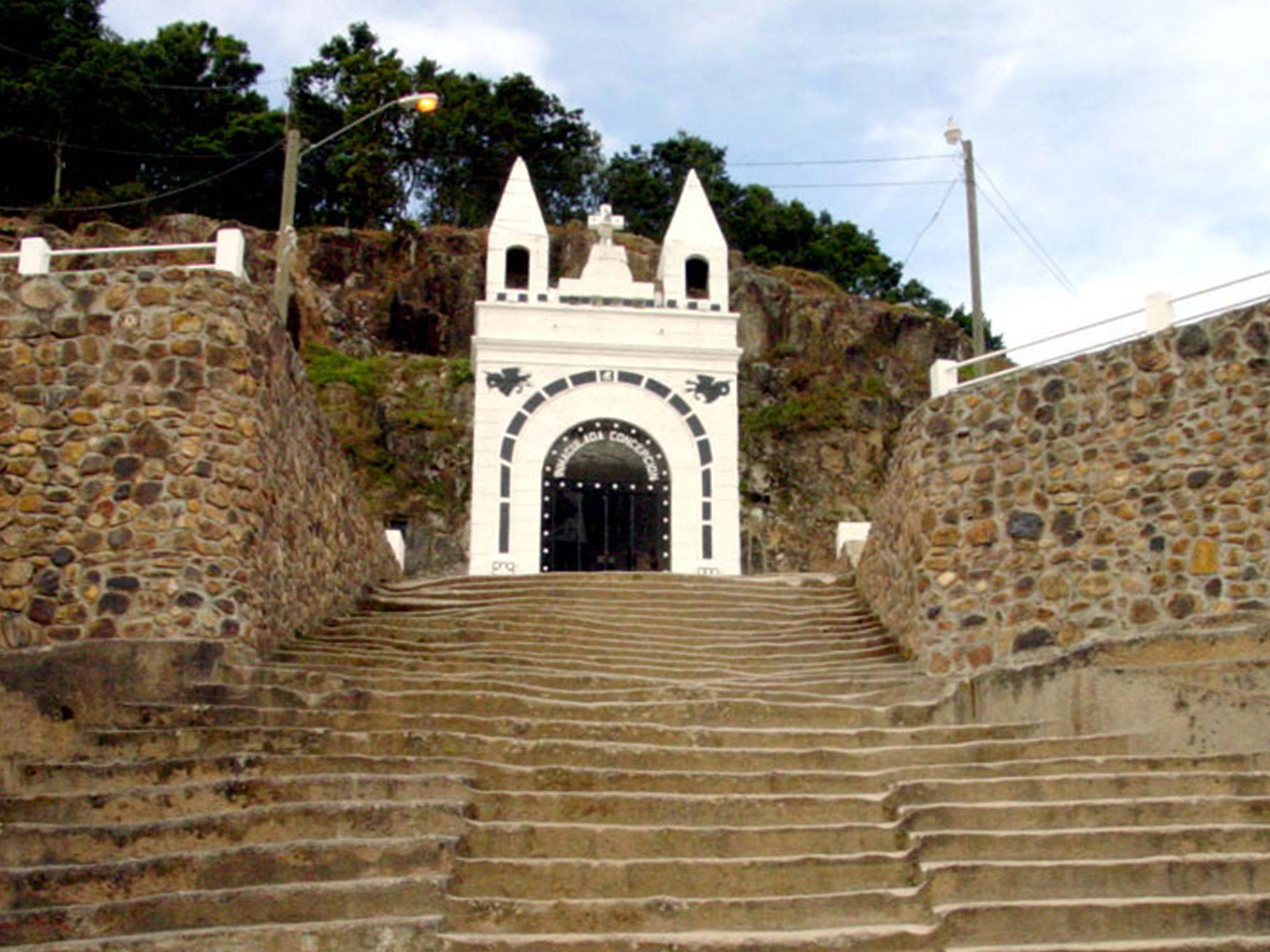
La Gruta

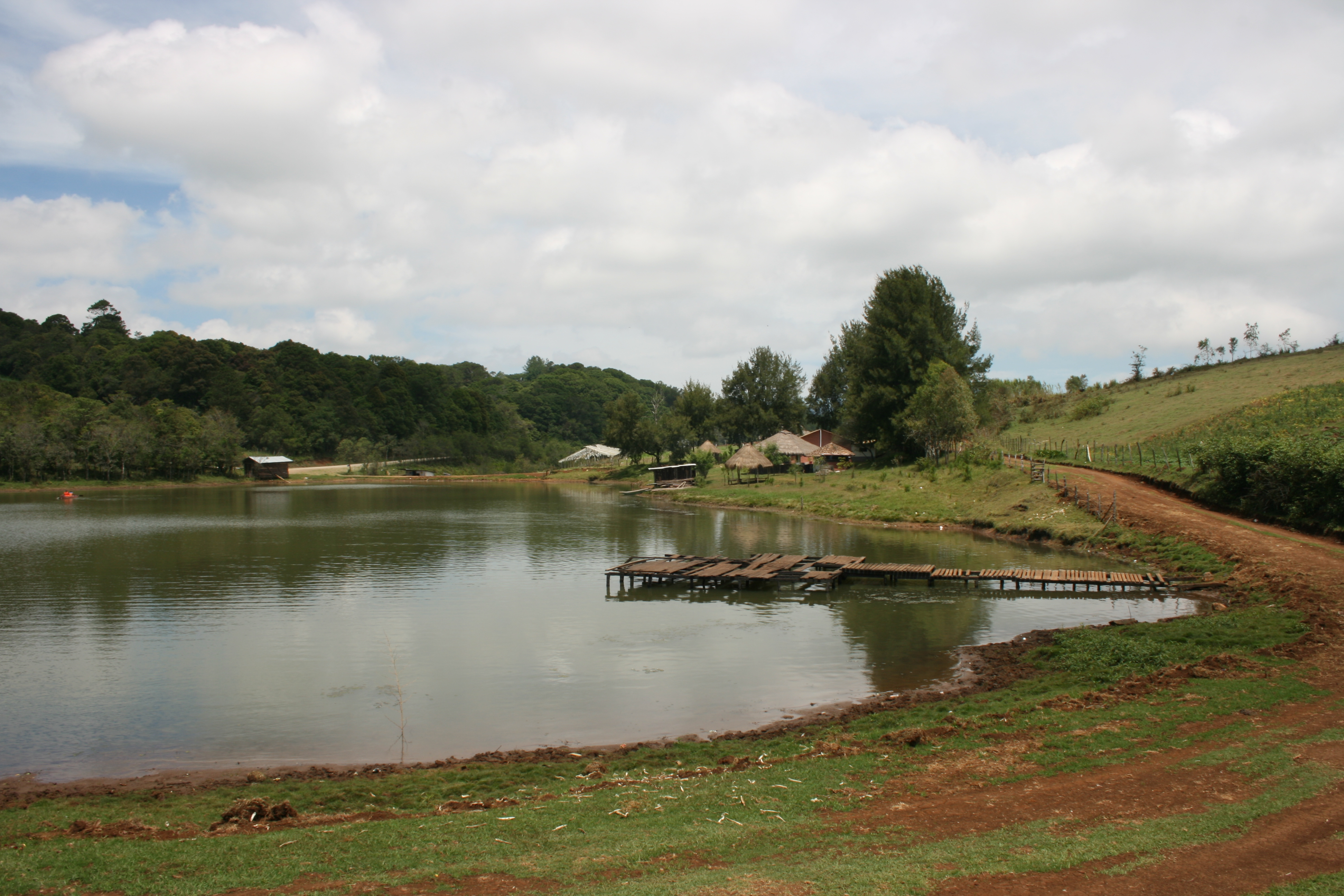
Laguna de Chiligatoro outside of La Esperanza

- La Gruta – This cave is located on a small hill overlooking town, 5 minutes walk from the Central Park. La Gruta is a shrine to Virgin of the Immaculate Conception (also known as the Virgin of Lourdes) at the top of 31 steps carved by hand in stone of volcanic origin. Religious ceremonies and cultural activities characteristic of the region are performed at the foot of the staircase. According to tradition, La Gruta was made by area residents and inmates of the penal center under orders of the commander of arms J. Inés Pérez during the government of Tiburcio Carías Andino. Perez reportedly built it to fulfill a vow that he made while hiding in the cave to escape being killed by his enemies. The staircase forks behind the chapel until it reaches a hill of dense vegetation that affords a dramatic view the city and the surrounding region.
- Lenca Cultural Museum – This is housed in the Casa de Cultura of La Esperanza, a large pink building two blocks up from the Central Park toward La Gruta. Open Monday through Friday, usually 12-4 pm, it features artefacts, artisan products, and a great deal of information about the history and culture of the Lenca people in the area (in Spanish). By asking a day in advance, docents are available.
- Baños Publicos El Quiscamote (Public Baths) – This is a spot where people wash their laundry at public water spigots. It also has a small pool for swimming, and tables and chairs for a picnic. People from the area are frequently found here on the hottest days. It is a 15-minute walk outside of town from near La Gruta.
- Lenca Market – The market features fresh produce, meat and cheese, and household items, clothes and other trinkets. It winds around a few blocks just north of the Intibucá Municipal Building.
- Parque de Bosque Enano (Dwarf Forest) – A short drive out of town on the road to Marcala, the forest contains can encounter over 500 unique dwarf trees that grow less than half a meter tall. Scientists still do not know exactly why this forest exists, but it's an interesting sight to see. There are no signs, services or designated areas; it is necessary to ask a local resident.
- Laguna de Madre Vieja (Lagoon of the Old Mother) – Arriving from Siguatepeque, you will find this small lagoon on the left side of the road just before entering town. The visitor can fish, rent a rowboat or just enjoy the silence at this tranquil spot.
- Laguna de Chiligatoro (Lagoon of Chiligatoro) – Just 30 minutes by bus from La Esperanza, this lagoon is an ideal spot to relax and swim for the day or rent a rowboat. There is a nearby restaurant with tipico food and just a few km further up the road the tourist can visit the women of El Cacao to watch them make traditional woven textiles.
- Estadio Romualdo Bueso – The main sports stadium in La Esperanza, Honduras. It is the home stadium of Atlético Esperanzano soccer team and Lenca Rugby Club. The stadium holds 3,000 people.
- Ballet Folklórico Oro Lenca – During festivals and holidays, this dance troupe performs regional dances in traditional costumes of La Esperanza and surrounding communities. Headquartered in the Casa de Cultura of La Esperanza, the group also hosts a national folk dance festival in La Esperanza each October.

== Transportation ==
La Esperanza can be most easily reached by car or bus from Siguatepeque via Highway 22 which is paved and in good condition. From La Esperanza, one can take the road to Yamaranguila and connect with Highway CA 11-A to reach San Juan, Intibucá; Gracias, Lempira; and Santa Rosa de Copán, Copan. Parts of the road between La Esperanza and San Juan are unpaved making them sometimes impassable during the rainy season, but the road is currently being paved. Transportes Carolina operates a fleet of Pullman buses which run hourly to/from Tegucigalpa and San Pedro Sula making stops at major cities along the way. There is also regular mini bus service to Marcala, Yamaranguila, San Juan, Erandique, Gracias and Santa Rosa de Copan all leaving from the main bus terminal near the entrance to town. Chicken buses run to smaller surrounding communities.

The nearby village of San Juan is known for its coffee production. It is near Erandique, home to the ancient fortress of Lempira, an indigenous Honduran hero who fought against the Spanish.

== Notable people ==
- Berta Caceres (Lenca), founder of COPINH and environmental and human rights activist; assassinated in March 2016.
- Nelson Gracias (Lenca), environmental activist, assassinated in March 2016.
- Rafael Manzanares Aguilar, Honduran folklorist, author and musical composer; founder and first director of the National Office of Folklore of Honduras (Oficina del Folklore Nacional de Honduras); founder and first director and choreographer of the Cuadro Nacional de Danza Folkloricas de Honduras.
- Vicente Mejía Colindres, president of Honduras in 1919 and again from 1929 to 1933. Both the start and end of the second tenure was marked by until then nearly unprecedented peaceful transfers of power from incumbent to opposition party.
