= Intibucá Department =

Intibucá Department Departamento de Intibucá
- Department
- Flag

- Location of Intibucá in Honduras
- Coordinates: 14°19′N 88°09′W
- Country: Honduras
- Capital: La Esperanza
- Largest city: Intibucá
- Municipalities: 17
- Villages: 126
- Founded: 16 April 1883

Government
  - Type: Departmental
  - Governor: Jose Alberto Vasquez (2022-2026) (LibRe)

Area
  - Total: 3,126 km^{2} (1,207 sq mi)
  - Rank: 14th

Population (2015)
  - Total: 241,568
  - Rank: 13th
  - Density: 77.28/km^{2} (200.1/sq mi)

GDP (Nominal, 2015 US dollar)
  - Total: $500 million (2023)
  - Per capita: $1,800 (2023)

GDP (PPP, 2015 int. dollar)
  - Total: $1.1 billion (2023)
  - Per capita: $3,700 (2023)
- Time zone: UTC-6 (CDT)
- Postal code: 14000, 14101, 14201
- ISO 3166 code: HN-IN
- HDI (2021): 0.577 medium · 16th of 18
- Statistics derived from Consult INE online database: Population and Housing Census 2013

Intibucá (Spanish pronunciation: [in.ti.βuˈka]) is one of the 18 departments in the Republic of Honduras. Intibucá covers a total surface area of 1,186.1 square miles (3,072 km^{2}). Its capital is the city of La Esperanza, in the municipality of La Esperanza.

== History ==
The department of Intibucá was created on April 16, 1883 upon recommendation of the Governor of the department of Gracias (now called Lempira), Jose Maria Cacho in 1869. He advised that the vast size of Gracias made it difficult to govern and that it would be desirable to divide it into more than one department.

On March 7, 1883 Decree No. 10 was issued, which called for the creation of a new department to be named Intibucá in April of that year. The town of La Esperanza was designated to be the capital of the new department. To create the new department, territory from both the departments of Gracias and La Paz were reassigned.

== Geography ==
The department of Intibucá is situated between latitudes 13°51'E and 14°42'N and longitudes 87°46'W and 88°42'W. It is bounded on the north by the departments of Comayagua, Lempira, and Santa Bárbara, on the east by the departments of Comayagua and La Paz, on the west by the department of Lempira, and on the south by the Republic of El Salvador. Intibucá is the most mountainous district of Honduras. The capital of La Esperanza lies at an elevation of 4,950 feet (1,510 m) above sea level. The table-land and valleys are higher than in any other part of the country, and the ranges of the Cordilleras rise to an altitude approaching 10,000 feet (3,000 m) feet above sea level.

The valley of Otoro is 30 km long by 8 km wide.

The Opalaca mountains have several ridges and crosses over into the department of La Paz. Sierra de Montecillos is a natural border with the department of Comayagua, and contains the mountains Opatoro, Concepción, El Picacho, Goascotoro, El Granadino among others.

=== Rivers ===
Rivers of La Esperanza include the San Juan River and the Intibucá River, which passes through La Esperanza. Otoro River is a tributary of the Ulua River, and carries water to the Otoro valley. The Black River, known by the name of Guarajambala River, serves as a dividing line with the department of Lempira. Torola River and Gualcarque River flow into the Lempa river.

== Population ==
According to the 1895 census, Intibucá had a population of 18,957 people at that time. In 2015, it had grown to 241,568 people, divided among 17 municipalities and 126 villages (aldeas).

== Forest resources ==
The mountains and slopes are well supplied with pine and Oak forests, and the valleys thrive with fertile, well-watered soil, covered with vegetation characteristic of the temperate rather than tropical zone.

== Municipalities ==
Intibucá has the following municipalities of Honduras:

1. Camasca
2. Colomoncagua
3. Concepción
4. Dolores
5. Intibucá
6. Jesús de Otoro
7. La Esperanza
8. Magdalena
9. Masaguara
10. San Antonio
11. San Francisco de Opalaca
12. San Isidro
13. San Juan
14. San Marcos de Sierra
15. San Miguel Guancapla
16. Santa Lucía
17. Yamaranguila

== Notable residents ==
- General Vicente Tosta Carrasco, President of the country (1924-1925)
- Doctor Vicente Mejía Colindres, Constitutional presidente of the Republic (1929-1933)
- General Gregorio Ferrera, military officer, politician, and Honduran leader
- Rafael Manzanares Aguilar, Honduran folklorist, author and musical composer; founder and first director of the National Office of Folklore of Honduras (Oficina del Folklore Nacional de Honduras); founder and first director and choreographer of the Cuadro de Danzas Folklóricas de Honduras.
- Rafael Pineda Ponce, politician and educator, born in San Miguelito.
- Natanael del Cid Menedez, Politician, Rancher, Constitutionalist.
