= Yamaranguila =

- Municipality
- Flag

- Location in Honduras
- Coordinates: 14°17′N 88°15′W
- Country: Honduras
- Department: Intibucá

Area
  - Total: 294 km^{2} (114 sq mi)

Population (2015)
  - Total: 21,633
  - Density: 73.6/km^{2} (191/sq mi)
- Postal code: 14000
- Municipality number: 1016
- Website: Official website

Yamaranguila is a municipality of about 21,000 residents in the Honduran department of Intibucá.

Yamaranguila is known as the coldest municipality in the country. Due to the climate, it is one of the few places where strawberries can be cultivated. Largely populated by the Lenca indigenous population, Yamaranguila is host to the traditional Guancascos parade during its feria in early December. Most residents have both electricity and running water in the central part of town, while the 24 surrounding villages are found in various stages of development.

== Demographics ==
At the time of the 2013 Honduras census, Yamaranguila municipality had a population of 21,025. Of these, 89.86% were Indigenous (89.55% Lenca), 9.45% Mestizo, 0.35% White, 0.32% Black or Afro-Honduran and 0.03% others.
