= Aguanqueterique =

- Municipality and village
- Location within Honduras
- Coordinates: 13°57′N 87°40′W
- Country: Honduras
- Department: La Paz

Area
  - Total: 187 km^{2} (72 sq mi)

Population (2015)
  - Total: 4,807
  - Density: 25.7/km^{2} (66.6/sq mi)

Aguanqueterique (Spanish pronunciation: [aɣwaŋketeˈɾike]) is a village and municipality in the Honduran department of La Paz, situated in the southwest of the country, with the principal village about 53 kilometres (33 mi) by road south of La Paz town. The municipality covers an area of 187 square kilometres (72 sq mi) and contains another village, Barrancaray, and 70 hamlets. As of 2001 it had a population of 4620.

Aguanqueterique is a producer of grains, sugarcane and coffee, and involved with cattle and poultry farming. Its patronal festival is the day of Our Lady of Mercy, held on September 24.

== History ==
The Municipality of Aguanqueterique has been cited as being founded in around 1500, and in 1694 it was listed as one of the towns in the Province of Comayagua. In the Mesoamerican language, the name means "place of the avocados".

At the time of the ecclesiastical census of 1791, it was chartered under the name San Pedro de Aguanqueterique, under the curacy of Comayagua. In 1825 it was documented to be part of the Parish of Goascorán, under Comayagua, and in 1889 it became a municipality of the District of San Antonio.

== Geography ==
Aguanqueterique is a large village and municipality covering an area of 187 square kilometres (72 sq mi) in the La Paz Department of southwest Honduras. By road it is about 53 kilometres (33 mi) by road south of La Paz, and 5.5 kilometres (3.4 mi) by road southeast of San Juan. Municipally, Aguanqueterique borders Lamani to the north, Curaren and Lepaterique to the east, San Antonio del Norte and Lauterique to the south, and Guajiquiro, San Juan, and San Antonio del Norte to the west. The other main village in the municipality is Barrancaray, and there are 70 hamlets.The average elevation is 1,486 metres (4,875 ft) above sea level.

== Demographics ==
At the time of the 2013 Honduras census, Aguanqueterique municipality had a population of 4,738. Of these, 65.23% were Indigenous (65.09% Lenca), 32.92%, Mestizo, 1.58% White, 0.25% Black or Afro-Honduran and 0.02% others.

== Economy ==
The municipality is a producer of grains, sugarcane and coffee, and cattle and poultry farming.

== Landmarks ==
The main village of Aguanqueterique contains the Plaza San Isidro, a central park, a football ground, the Hogar Materno Infantil hospital and the Monasterio Anuciasion de Las Siervas to the southeast.

== Culture ==
The patronal festival of Aguanqueterique is the day of Our Lady of Mercy, held on September 24.
