= Lencan languages =

Moribund language family of Honduras and El Salvador

Lencan
- Geographic distribution: El Salvador and Honduras
- Ethnicity: Lenca people
- Linguistic classification: Macro-Chibchan ?: Lencan
- Subdivisions: Honduran Lencan †; Salvadoran Lencan (†)

Language codes
- ISO 639-3: len
- Glottolog: lenc1239
- Map of El Salvador's Indigenous Peoples at the time of the Spanish conquest: 1. Pipil people, 2. Lenca people, 3. Kakawira o Cacaopera, 4. Xinca, 5. Maya Ch'orti' people, 6. Maya Poqomam people, 7. Mangue o Chorotega.

- Lenca is classified as Extinct according to the UNESCO Atlas of the World's Languages in Danger

The Lencan languages are a small language family native to Central America, whose speakers lived throughout El Salvador and Honduras during the Pre-Columbian era. By the beginning of the 20th century, only two languages of the family survived, Salvadoran Lenca or Potón and Honduran Lenca, which were described and studied academically. Of the two, only Salvadoran Lenca still has speakers, despite the fact that there are between 37,000 and 100,000 people belonging to the Lenca ethnic group.

== Languages ==
There are two attested Lencan languages:

- Salvadoran Lencan was spoken in Chilanga and Guatajigua. Lencans had arrived in El Salvador about 2,295 years B.P. and founded the site of Quelepa. One speaker remains.
- Honduran Lencan was spoken with minor dialect differences in Intibucá, Opatoro, Guajiquiro, Similatón (modern Cabañas), and Santa Elena. Some phrases survive; it is not known if the entire language still exists.

The languages are not closely related; Swadesh (1967) estimated 3,000 years since separation. Arguedas Cortés (1987) reconstructs Proto-Lencan with 12 consonants (including ejective) and 5 vowels.

== External relationships ==
The external relationships of the Lencan languages are disputed. Inclusion within Macro-Chibchan has often been proposed; Campbell (1987) reported that he found no solid evidence for such a connection, but Constenla-Umaña (2005) proposed regular correspondence between Lencan, Misumalpan, and Chibchan.

Campbell (2012) acknowledges that these claims of connection between Lencan, Misumalpan, and Chibchan have not yet been proved systematically, but he notes that Constenla-Umaña (2005) "presented evidence to support a relationship with two neighboring families [of languages]: Misumalpan and Lencan, which constitute the Lenmichí Micro-Phylum. According to Constenla-Umaña's study (2005), the Lenmichi Micro-Phylum first split into Proto-Chibchan and Proto-Misulencan, the common intermediate ancestor of the Lencan and the Misumalpan languages. This would have happened around 9,726 years before the present or 7,720 B.C. (the average of the time depths between the Chibchan languages and the Misulencan languages)...The respective subancestors of the Lencan and the Misumalpan languages would have separated around 7,705 before the present (5,069 B.C.), and Paya and the other intermediate ancestors of all the other Chibchan languages would have separated around 6,682 (4,676 B.C.)."

Another proposal by Lehmann (1920:727) links Lencan with the Xincan language family, though Campbell (1997:167) rejects most of Lehmann's twelve lexical comparisons as invalid. An automated computational analysis (ASJP 4) by Müller et al. (2013) also found lexical similarities between Lencan and Xincan. However, since the analysis was automatically generated, the grouping could be either due to mutual lexical borrowing or genetic inheritance.

== History ==
The Proto-Lencan homeland was most likely in central Honduras (Campbell 1997:167).

At the end of the 19th century and the beginning of the 20th century, the use of Honduran Lenca and Salvadoran Lenca began to decline. In the 1950s, Honduran Lenca was already in a critical state of extinction, since the only place where there were speakers was Guajiquiro. In 1982 a Honduran Lenca speaker was found in Guajiquiro. In the 1970s, died in Chilanga, Anselmo Hernández, the last competent Salvadoran Lenca speaker. In the 1990s, some semi-speakers of Honduran Lenca were found. It was assumed that the languages were extinct, no elders had any knowledge or memory of either language, and there were no fluent speakers. Honduran Lenca is currently believed to be extinct.

In the case of Salvadoran Lenca, at the end of the nineties Consuelo Roque, linguist from the University of El Salvador (UES), found Mario Salvador Hernández from Guatajiagua (a semi-speaker who is considered the last native speaker by the Salvadoran newspapers, specifically of the variant of that town, and who learned the language from his grandmother) and both would write a learning primer titled: Poton piau, nuestra lengua Potón. However, linguist Alan R. King, in his 2016 book titled Conozcamos el Lenca, una lengua de El Salvador (where he also used the Potón Piau primer as a reference), points out that (translated into English): "Today no one knows how to speak Lenca, although certain individuals have memories of—or have learned—some fragments of that now lost language. This type of partial knowledge is not even remotely close, in any case that we have been able to verify, to a real mastery of the historical language, whose disappearance dates back to the mid-twentieth century...".

While in the case of Honduran Lenca, the American linguist Alan R. King and his colleague James Morrow published the book Kotik molka niwamal (meaning Let's learn to speak Lenca) in 2017, which is a compilation of words in Lenca among the communities still existing that opens the possibility of recovering a significant part of the language. Currently in El Salvador there are rehabilitation projects for Salvadoran Lenca to prevent its extinction.

A 2002 novel by Roberto Castillo, La guerra mortal de los sentidos, chronicles the adventures of the "Searcher for the Lenca Language."

== Proto-language ==
Proto-Lencan
- Reconstruction of: Lencan languages

Proto-Lenca reconstructions by Arguedas (1988), along with forms in daughter languages from Campbell (1999):

No.	Spanish gloss (original)	English gloss (translated)	Proto-Lenca	Honduran Lenca	Chilanga
1.	abrir	open (verb)	*inkolo-		
2.	agua	water	*was	was	wal
3.	anciana	old woman			
4.	araña	spider	*katu	katu	katu
5.	ardilla	squirrel	*suri	suri-sur	ʃurih
6.	bailar	dance	*uli-		
7.	bañar	bathe	*twa-		
8.	beber	drink	*tali-	tal-	tal-
9.	blanco	white	*soko	soko	ʃoko
10.	boca	mouth	*in		
11.	bueno	good	*sam	sa	ʃam
12.	cabello	hair	*asak		
13.	caites	sandals	*waktik	waktik	watih
14.	camarón	shrimp	*siksik	siksik	sisih
15.	camino	path	*k’in	kin	k’in
16.	casa	house	*t’aw	taw	t’aw
17.	cerrar	close (verb)	*inkap-		
18.	cinco	five	*ts’aj	saj	ts’aj
19.	comal	comal	*k’elkin	kelkin	k’elkin
20.	comprar	buy	*liwa-	liwa-	liwa-
21.	cortar	cut	*tajk-		
22.	coyol	coyol	*juku	juku	juku
23.	coyote	coyote	*sua		
24.	chupar	suck			
25.	decir	say	*aj-		
26.	desear	want	*saj	saj-	ʃej-
27.	diente	tooth	*nek	nek	neh
28.	dos	two	*pe	pe	pe
29.	él	he	*inani		
30.	enfermo, estar	sick	*ona-		
31.	espina	thorn	*ma		
32.	este	this	*na		
33.	estrella	star	*sirik	siri	sirih
34.	flor	flower	*sula	suna	ʃila
35.	fuego	fire	*juk’a		
36.	grande	big	*pukV	puki	puka
37.	guacal	tub	*k’akma		
38.	hermano	brother	*pelek		
39.	hígado	liver	*muts’u	musu	muts’u
40.	hormiga	ant	*its’its’i		
41.	hueso	bone	*ts’ek		
42.	ir	go	*o-		
43.	jocote	jocote	*muraka		
44.	lavar	wash	*ts’ajk-	sak-	ts’ih-
45.	leña	firewood	*sak	sak	ʃah
46.	lluvia	rain	*so	so	ʃo
47.	macho	male	*kew		
48.	maíz	corn	*ajma		
49.	mapachín	raccoon	*wala	wala	wala
50.	milpa	cornfield	*ta	ta	ta
51.	montaña	mountain	*kotan		
52.	mover	move	*lum-		
53.	nariz	nose	*nep		
54.	niño	boy	*we		
55.	nosotros	we	*apinani		
56.	nube	cloud			
57.	oír	hear	*eni-		
58.	orinar	urinate	*wajsa-		
59.	pavo	turkey	*lok		
60.	peine	comb	*tenmaskin		
61.	pelo, pluma	hair, feather			
62.	perro	dog	*su		
63.	pico	peak	*ints’ek		
64.	piedra	stone	*ke	ke	ke
65.	piña	pineapple	*mats’ati		
66.	piojo	louse	*tem	tem	tem
67.	puerco de monte	wild pig	*map’it, *nap’it		
68.	pulga	flea	*t’ut’u	tutu	t’ut’u
69.	quebracho	quebracho tree	*sili	sili	sili
70.	quién	who	*k’ulan	kunan	k’ula
71.	reír	laugh	*jolo-	jet-	jete-
72.	río	river	*wara	wara	wara
73.	roble	oak	*mal		
74.	ropa	clothes	*lam-		
75.	rostro	face	*tik		
76.	saber	know	*ti-		
77.	seis	six	*wi		
78.	sembrar	sow	*isa-		
79.	tapesco, cama	bed frame, bed	*le-		
80.	tigre (jaguar), león (puma)	tiger (jaguar), lion (puma)	*lepa	lepa	lepa
81.	tocar	touch	*jete-		
82.	trabajar	work			
83.	tres	three	*lawa	lawa	lawa
84.	tú	you (sg.)	*amanani		
85.	uña	fingernail	*kumam	kuma	kumam
86.	venir	come	*po-		
87.	yo	I	*unani		
88.	zarigüeya	opossum	*ts’ewe		
89.	zopilote	vulture	*kus		

== Bibliography ==
- Campbell, Lyle. 1997. American Indian Languages: The Historical Linguistics of Native America. Oxford: Oxford University Press.
- Campbell, Lyle. 2012. The Indigenous Languages of South America: A Comprehensive Guide. De Gruyter Mouton: Walter de Gruyter GmbH & Co. KG, Berlin/Boston.
- Constenla Umaña, Adolfo. (1981). Comparative Chibchan Phonology. (Ph.D. dissertation, Department of Linguistics, University of Pennsylvania, Philadelphia).
- Constenla Umaña, Adolfo. (1991). Las lenguas del Área Intermedia: Introducción a su estudio areal. Editorial de la Universidad de Costa Rica, San José.
- Constenla Umaña, Adolfo. (1995). Sobre el estudio diacrónico de las lenguas chibchenses y su contribución al conocimiento del pasado de sus hablantes. Boletín del Museo del Oro 38-39: 13-56.
- Constenla Umaña, Adolfo (2005). "Existe relacion genealogica entre las lenguas misumalpas y las chibchenses?" Estudios de Linguistica Chibcha. 23: 9–59.
- Fabre, Alain. 2005. Diccionario etnolingüístico y guía bibliográfica de los pueblos indígenas sudamericanos: LENCA.
- Hemp, Eric. 1976. "On Earlier Lenca Vowels". International Journal of American Linguistics 42(1): 78-79.
- Lehman, Walter. 1920. Zentral-Amerika. see pp. 700–719 (Salvadoran Lenca) and pp. 668–692 (Honduran Lenca).
