= Honduran folklore =

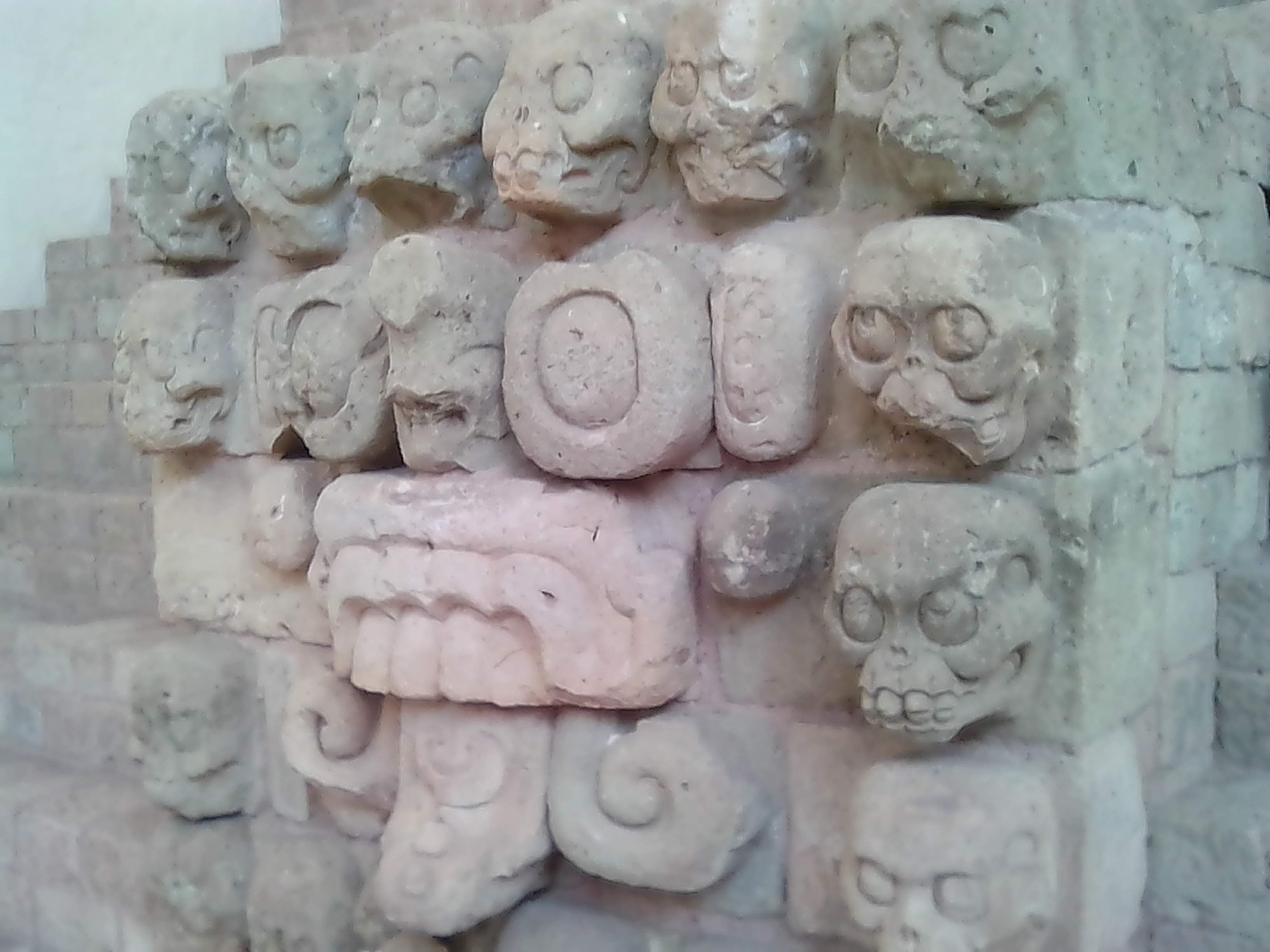
Rain god Chaac ar the Mayan Sculpture Museum, Honduran Folklore has been shaped in part by the influence of other pre-Columbian myths

Honduras has rich folk traditions that derive from the fusion of four different cultural groups: indigenous, European, African and Creole. Each department or region, municipality, village and even hamlet contributes its own traditions including costumes, music, beliefs, stories, and all the elements that derive from and are transformed by peoples in a population. In sum, these define Honduran Folklore as expressed by crafts, tales, legends, music and dances.

== Folktales and legends ==
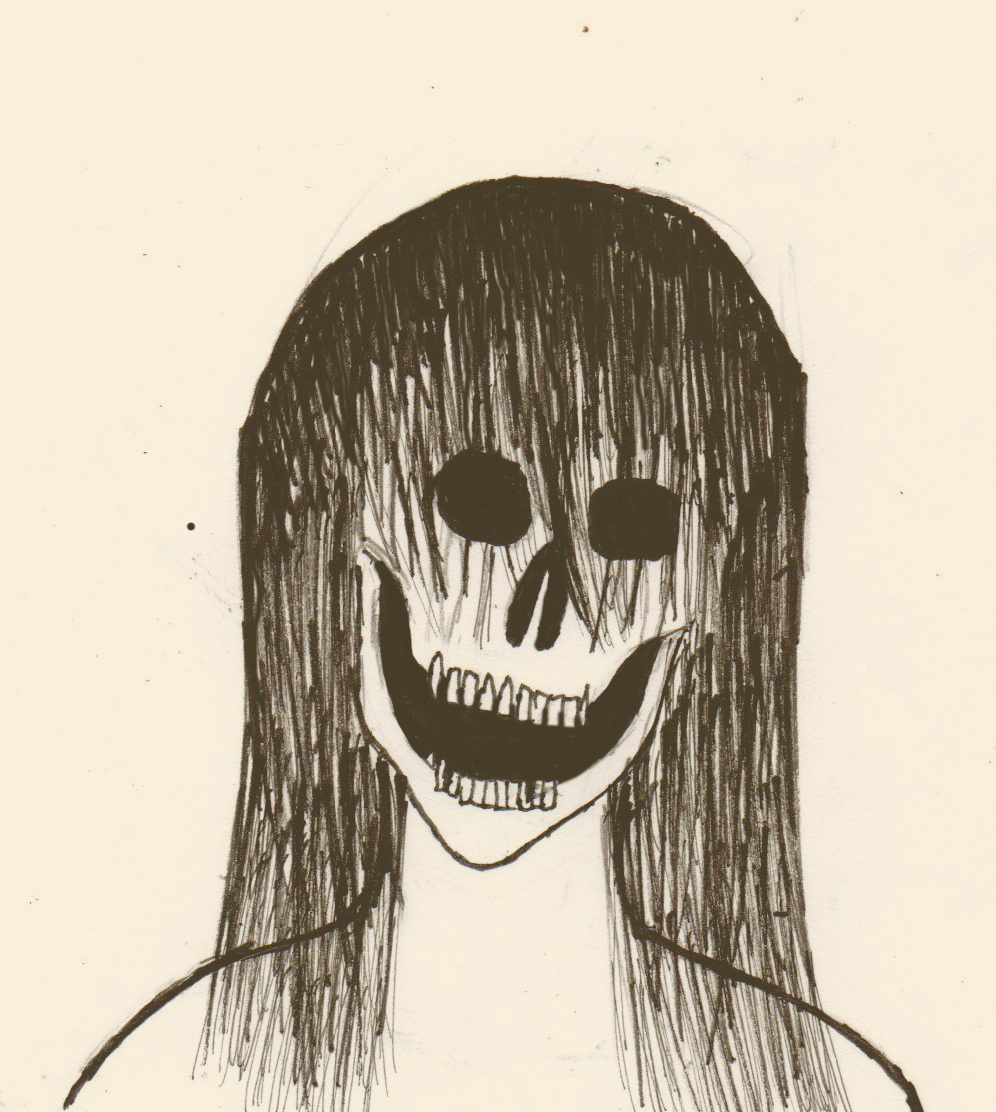
Honduran version of La Siguanabana.

Numerous characters form part of the folklore and popular beliefs of Honduras. Some are designed to terrorize listeners, while others try to convince listeners to behave well or they may suffer an unhappy outcome described in a story. The exact details of a story often differs between villages or regions, or according to the style of a story teller. Some characters of legend that stand out are:

La Lluvia de Peces de Yoro (Yoro's Fish Rain)
The Yoro Fish Rain is an extraordinary meteorological phenomenon. As of 2024, there is no cemented scientific proof of why this phenomenon occurs. According to the inhabitants of Yoro, this phenomenon has been occurring in this area for more than a century. Witnesses of this phenomenon point out that it begins with a darkening of the sky caused by dense clouds, followed by lightning and thunder, strong winds, and rain - lasting 2 to 3 hours (typical behavior of tropical storms). Once the rain has stopped, the villagers find hundreds of fish scattered on the ground, still alive. The villagers collect them and transport them to their homes to cook and eat them later. The fish are freshwater, they are always found alive, they do not lack eyes, they are not huge but small and, according to the villagers, they are not the type of fish found in nearby areas. Since 1998, a festival known as the Rain of Fish Festival has been held every year.
Cadejo

1. A supernatural character from Central American and southern Mexican folklore.
2. 2. The tale of the mythical creature with which parents threatened their children not to misbehave.
La Mula Herrada (the shod mule)

A story of an apparition of a hellish mule accompanied by the dragging sound of a horse shoe.
El Bulero (the shoeshine man)

The fantastic tale of an vengeful crowd taking a shoeshine man from the Church of Mercy (Iglesia de La Merced), where he had taken refuge in the ancient city Gracias a Dios (now Gracias, Lempira). A punishment was meted to the populace after they beheaded him for profaning the sanctuary of the church (vox populi graciana).
La Sucia (the filthy one)

The popular story of a beautiful young woman denied marriage at the altar because she was unbaptized. She then wandered out of mind, never removing her increasingly filthy wedding dress until she died of heartbreak after her suitor married another. The story follows that she appears in beautiful form to lure men roaming drunk by rivers and streams, so enraptured by her beauty they follow her until she changes into a filthy horror that drives men crazy.
La Carreta Fantasma (The Cart Ghost)
The story of a ne'er-do-well who was found stabbed to death in his cart, which was then abandoned in a nearby lot. Villagers would then hear but not see the cart at night until one man determined to see it was found stricken to die shortly after.
La Llorona (The Weeping Woman)

The story of a woman who drowned her children and then drowns herself. For her sin she is doomed to wander crying for her children.
El Gritón (The Screamer)
A class of stories that describe encounters with either a headless creature or lost souls that scream at night.
El Timbó
A disturbing creature that prowls around cemeteries and feeds on corpses. He walks on two legs, has a bulging belly and reddish fur, with extremely long arms and huge claws that serve to root out graves.
El Picudo

A creature with a dog's body and a pig's face that feeds on the blood of other animals.
El Cíclope de la selva Misquita (The Cyclops of the Miskito Jungle)
A belief among indigenous natives of the Misquito jungle in a being that resembles the cyclops with one eye. The people in the region have many different stories about this creature.
La Taconuda
A tall woman with long hair that reaches to her calf who leaves a strong scent of perfume when she passes. She grabs men and drives them crazy, leaving them numb and naked by the road.
La leyenda del indio que se convertía en tigre
Stories of a demonic tiger in that converted to and from an Indian to a tiger (The Legend of the Indian who Converted to a Tiger, Rancho Grande).

== Folk music ==
=== Indigenous music ===
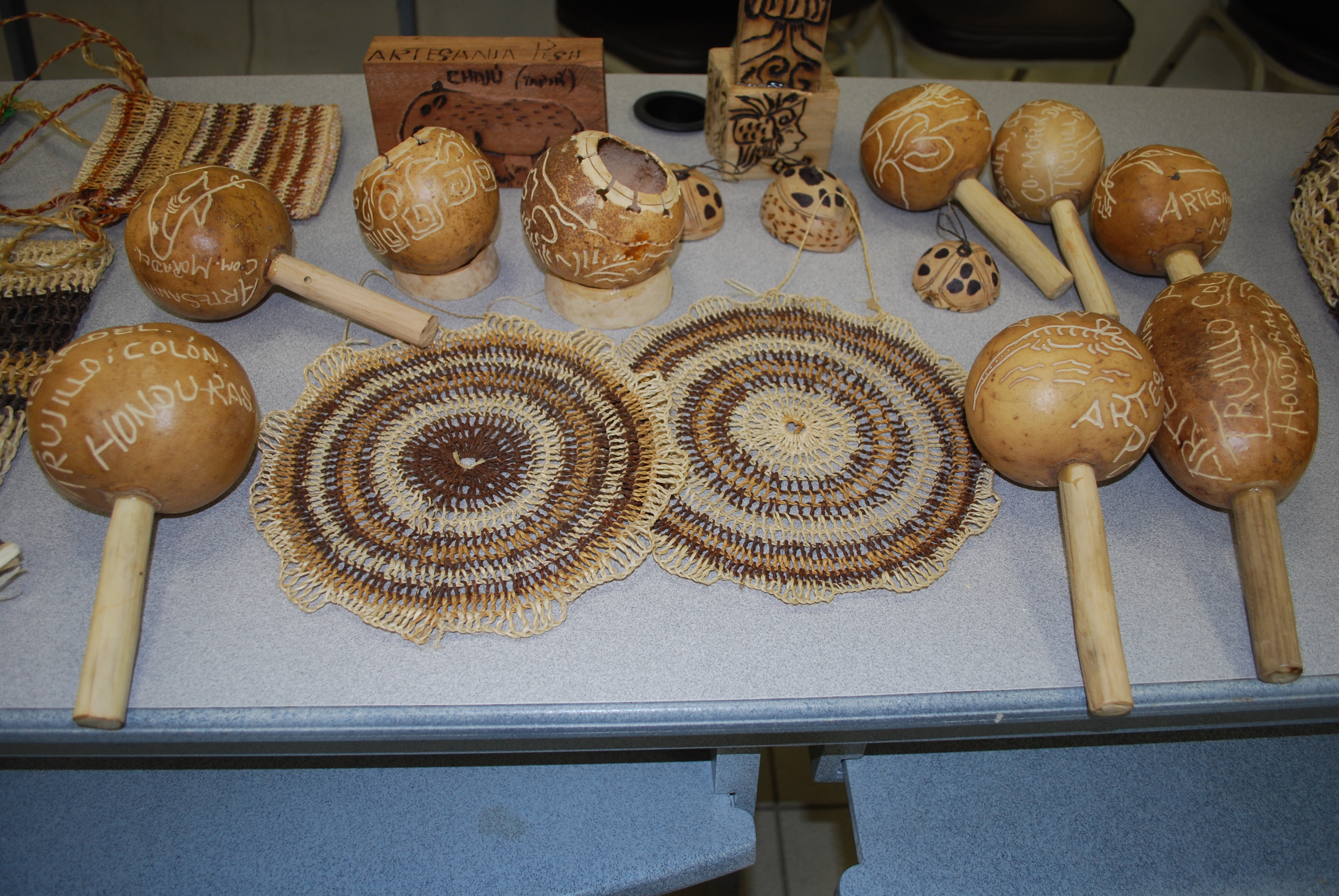
Assorted crafts made by the Pech people.

The music of the indigenous groups is derived from cultural traditions of the pre-Hispanic civilizations of Central America. Indigenous groups still in Honduras include the Lenca, Miskitu, Tawahka, Pech, Maya Chortis, and Xicaques. Indigenous traditions have been well documented. Some of the pre-Hispanic musical instruments include Mud Frogs Whistles (type of whistle made from clay or mud in the shape of a frog), conch shells, tortoise shells, and maracas. The maracas are two hollowed-out shells, which contain natural seeds, called "tears of Saint Peter." Other traditional Honduran instruments used with indigenous dance include the marimba, caramba, and accordion, along with drums.

=== Creole music ===
- El Candú -
- Pitero (The Armadillo)
- Flores de Mimé
- El Bananero
- Los inditos
- El costeño (The man from the [Miskito] coast)
- El Tartamudo
- Corrido a Honduras (Run to Honduras)
- La valona
- Adios Garcita morena
- Al rumor de las selvas Hondureñas (To the rumour of the Honduran jungles) by Carlos Maria Varela

== Typical clothing ==
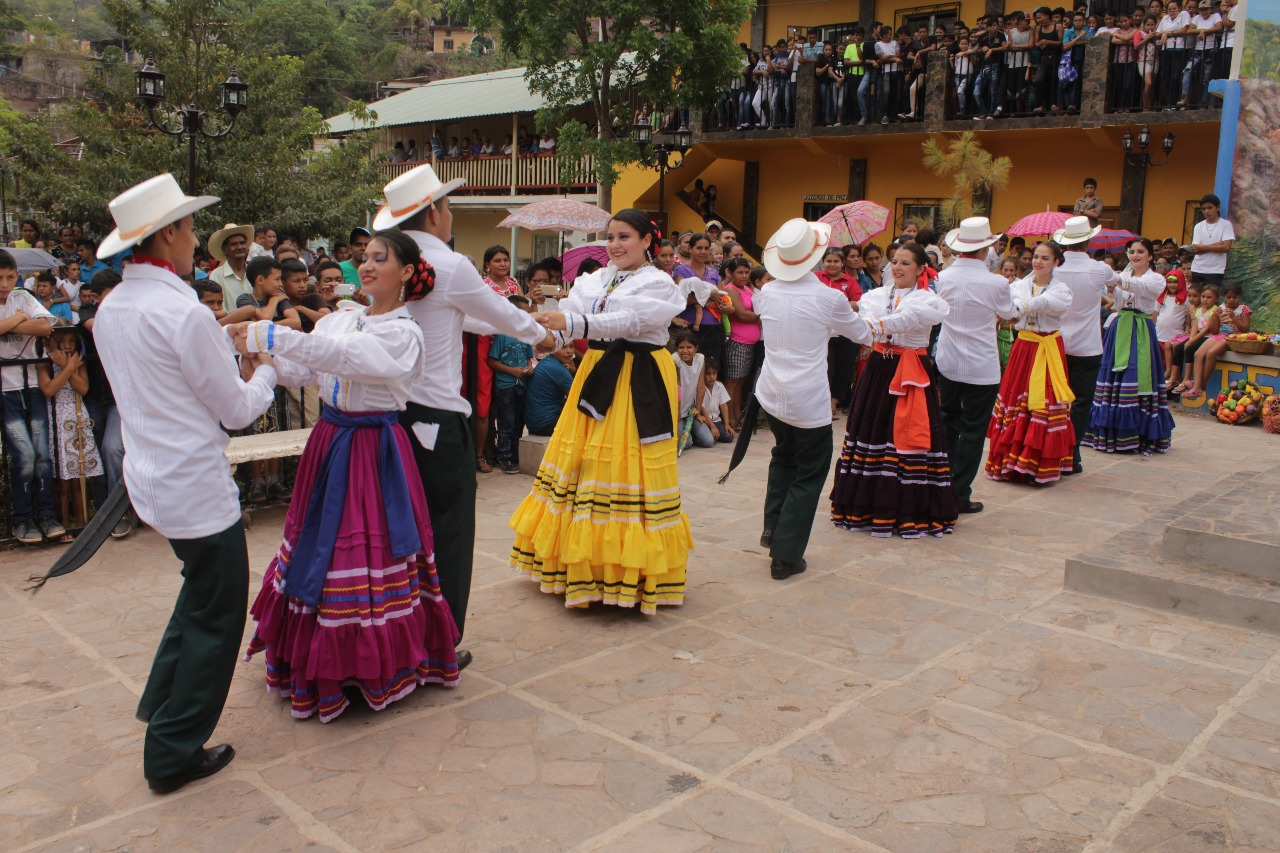
Traditional Honduran Creole clothing.

There is a variety of Honduran traditional or folkloric clothes and costumes, mostly named for the region from which they originated. Traditional clothing and music are often labeled by one of four broad categories:

- Indigenous (originating from native traditions dating back before the colonial conquest)
- Creole (resulting from the mix of European and indigenous traditions)
- Colonial (resulting from European roots)
- Garifuna (resulting from African roots)

Within these categories, costumes are categorized by specific region (department, city or municipality, village, or hamlet) and ethnic group from which they originate. (Note: Traditional costumes are researched and documented by folklorists working in the field and authenticated by the National Office of Folklore. There are currently around 140 different costumes registered with the National Office of Folklore (Oficina del Folclore Nacional), and additional customs are added as they are researched and authenticated. The National Office of Folklore is part of the Ministry of Public Education.) The following is a list of some of the traditional costumes:

- Costume of Carrizalón and Tapesco (village Carrizalón municipality of Copán Ruinas, Copán Department)
- Costume of Cacautare (village in the municipality of Pespire, department of Choluteca)
- Costume of Jocomico (department of Francisco Morazán)
- Costume of Copán (department)
- Maya Ch'orti costume
- Costume of the Muslims and Christians (Saint Andrés, Ocotepeque Department)
- Costume of the Viejos (Saint Andrés, and Saint Rafael, province of Ocotepeque)
- Costume of the Forastines (Saint Andrés, and Saint Rafael, province of Ocotepeque)
- Costume of Linaca (in the department of Choluteca)
- Costume of Opatoro (municipality in the department of La Paz)
- Costume from Santa Barbará (hamlet of Escondido, Estancia municipality of Santa Bárbara Department, Honduras
- Campesino costume from Santa Barbará
- Guancasco costume (Note: Guancasco, a Lenca term, refers to a tradition of holding a celebration that unites two groups of people. The Honduran group Café Guanasco made reference to this tradition with their name, and performed in front of the presidential palace in protest of the 2009 coup that removed President Zelaya from office) of Gracias and Mejicapa Lempira Department
- Dance costume of Garrobo (La Campa, Lempira Department
- Mogigangas costume (Chinda, Gualala and Ilama, municipality of Santa Barbará)
- Colonial princess-style costume of Comayagua Department
- Lamaní costume, department of Comayagua
- Negrito costume (municipality of Santa Elena, La Paz)
- Costume of La Paz department
- Costume of Marcala, La Paz
- Indigenous costume of La Esperanza, Intibucá
- Costume of Guajiniquil (village of Guajiniquil, municipality of Concepción, department of Intibucá)
- Costume from La Villa de Camasca (municipality Camasca, department of Intibucá)
- Costume of the department of Francisco Morazán
- Costume of Comayagua
- Costumes of the Muslims and Christians of Ojojona and Lepaterique (department of Francisco Morazán)
- Costume of Tolupan (mountain of the flower) department of Francisco Morazán
- Costume of Valley of Agalta (village the Avocado, municipality of Saint Esteban, department of Olancho)
- Costume of Sierra de Agalta. (villages The Avocado, Dead Bull, the Sale, municipality of Saint Esteban, department of Olancho)
- Costume of Coyolar (hamlet Coyolar, municipality of Saint Esteban, department of Olancho)
- Costume of Los Desmontes (village Los Desmontes, municipality of San Francisco de la Paz, department of Olancho)
- Costume of Tilapa (village of Tilapa, municipality of San Francisco de la Paz, department of Olancho)
- costume of Santa Elena (village Pedrero, municipality of Saint Esteban, department of Olancho)
- Pech costume (department of Olancho and Yoro)
- Tawahkas costume (department of Olancho)
- Gracias a Dios costume, Misquitos costume
- Cortés costume, Omoa costume (department of Cortés)
- Atlántida costume, costume of La Ceiba
- Costumes of Afro-Caribbean ethnicity from Colon (Note: Garífuna costume called veluria" the woman's Garifuna costume is called the gongnu costume of warini (the Christmas herald) costume wanarahgua (mascaro), indigenous costume, shepherd's costume, tiras dance costume (game and dance of the Muslims and Christians).)
- Indigenous costumes of Muslims and Christians of Ojojona and Lepaterique. (Ojojona, department of Francisco Morazán)
- clothes of the blacks of Gracias and Mejicapa (Graciasand Mejicapa, department of Lempira)
- Dance costume of San Sebastián, Lempira (the dance of the crowns between San Sebastián and Mejicapa)
- Costume of the Muslims and Christian (Saint Andrés, department of Ocotepeque)
- Costume of the Garrobo (La Campa, department of Lempira)
- Mogigangas costume (Chinda, Gualala and Ilama, department of Santa Barbará, Francisco Morazán Department)
- Forastines costume (San Andrés, department of Ocotepeque)
- Veijos costume (San Andrés, department of Ocotepeque)
- Tolupan costume (Montaña de la Flor, department of Francisco Morazán)

== Dance in Honduras ==
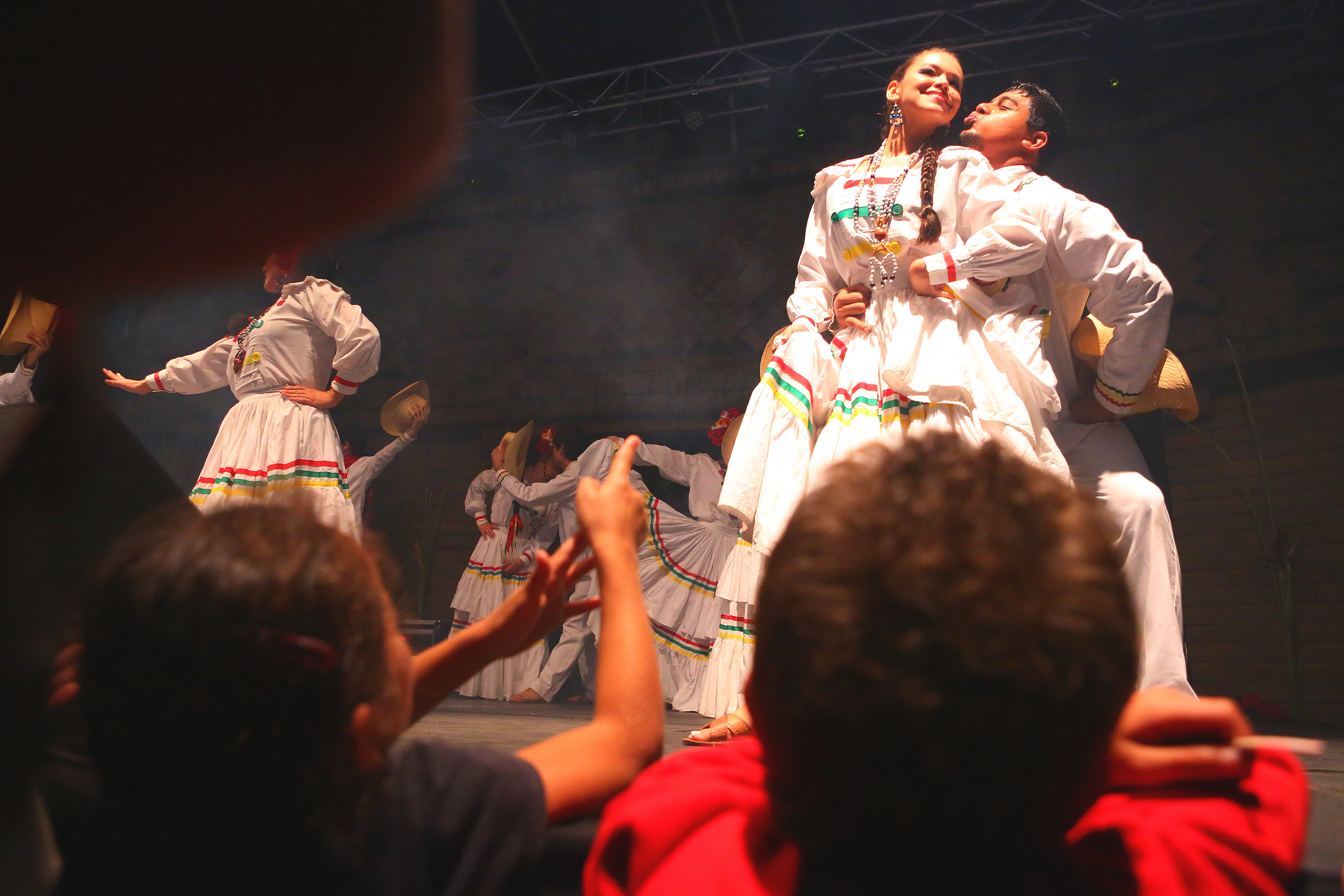
Honduran traditional dance.

Honduran folklore is very varied and interesting by the cultural elements that result in the four major ethnic groups (indigenous, creole or mestizos, Spaniards, and Garífuna). As each province has its own traditions, music and beliefs, so it was for dance. (Note: Traditional dances are researched and documented by folklorists working in the field and authenticated by the National Office of Folklore. There are currently around 106 different dances registered with the National Office of Folklore (Oficina del Folclore Nacional), and additional dances are added as they are researched and authenticated. The National Office of Folklore is part of the Ministry of Public Education.)

=== Indigenous dances ===
The indigenous dances are influenced primarily by the pre-Columbian culture. The following are indigenous dances that have been authenticated by the National Office of Folklore:

Dance	Researcher	Region	Sample
El Acordeoncito	David Flores; Erika Cecilia Cuellar; Luis Gustavo Castellán	Aldea Pavana, municipality Choluteca, department Choluteca	* Inst. Jose Cecilio del Valle
La Aguateña	David Flores; Erika Cecilia Cuellar; Luis Gustavo Castellán	Caserío Las Casas viejas, aldea La Venta, Municipio de Gualaco, Olancho	
Amor en Puyitas	David Adolfo Flores; Ramón Antonio Bonilla Coello	Caserío El Escondido, aldea La Estancia, Santa Bárbara	* Instituto Jose Cecilio Del Valle Choluteca * Instituto Polivalente Lejamani * Instituto Gregorio Consuegra Danza
Cachazas con Leche	David Adolfo Flores; Ramón Antonio Bonilla Coello	Aldea el Ocotillo del municipio de Arada y aldeas aledañas, Santa Bárbara	* Instituto San Jose
La Cadena	Rafael Manzanares Aguilar	Olanchito, Yoro	* El Instituto Jesus Aguilar Paz en Ia Villa Olimpica * Las Lajas (2012)
La Campesina	Diógenes Álvarez; Neptalí Cáceres	Aldea de Cerro Galán, municipio de Guata, departamento de Olancho	* Instituto Jesus Aguilar Paz de Tegucigalpa * Tecnico Rio Lindo Honduras
La Colozuka	Gaspar Mejía Molina	Municipio de San Sebastián, Lempira	* Cuadro de Danzas Folklóricas ARTE-UNAH * Cuadro Nacional de Danzas Folklóricas de Honduras
Las Escobas	Rafael Manzanares Aguilar	Santa María, La Paz	* Ballet Folklorico Sampedrano Sectur * Grupo Folklórico Lentercala
La Estaca	Luis Gustavo Castellón; David Adolfo Flores Valladares	Aldea El Tunal, municipio de San Esteban, departamento de Olancho	* Cuadro Nacional de Danzas Folklóricas de Honduras * Herederos de Cicumba
El Indio o Pájaro Tristón (o Pájaro Triste?)	Oscar Guevara	Aldea de Copal Arriba, municipio de Choluteca, departamento de Choluteca	*
La Lima	David Adolfo Flores; Ramón Antonio Bonilla Coello	Caserío El Escondido, aldea La Estancia, municipio de Santa Bárbara y aldeas circunvecinas	*
La Picoteña	Tania Pinto de Morán; Sara Emilia Mendoza	Aldea Pavana, municipio de Choluteca, Choluteca	* Escuela Bilingüe Honduras * Inst Rafael Pineda Ponce
La Piedrita	Wilberto Bonilla Ríos	Marcala y las aldeas aledañas, La Paz	* Dr Leonardo Martinez de San Pedro Sula * CEB Ramón Rosa SPS
La Pieza del Indio	Tania Pinto de Moran; Auxiliadora Narváez; Jesús Valladares	Caserío de San Ramón Abajo, aldea de San Ramón Abajo, Linaca, municipio de Choluteca, departamento de Choluteca	* Instituto Tecnológico Sampedrano * Intibuca Cuadro de danzas de Niños Lencas (La Esperanza)
La Pulguita	Wilberto Bonilla Ríos	Municipio de Marcala, La Paz	* Instituto Santo Thomas * Yum Kax
El Son de Tuno	Tania Pinto de Moran	Aldea el Papalón, Municipio de Choluteca	* Instituto Polivalente Nuevo Paraiso
Sos un Ángel	Rafael Manzanares Aguilar	Olanchito, Yoro	* Sos un Ángel * Centro Escolar Alberto Masferrer
El Sueñito	Rafael Manzanares Aguilar	Cacautare, Pespire, Choluteca	* Ballet Folklórico de Honduras Oro Lenca (2014) * Grupo de Proyección Folklórica Zorzales de Sula con Marimba Usula Internacional
El Sueñito Letra			*
Tap-Sap	Carlos Gómez; Rubén Ruiz	Municipio de Brus Laguna, Gracias A Dios	* Cuadro de danzas ARTE UNAH
Torito Pinto	Rafael Manzanares Aguilar	La Esperanza, Intibucá y Alianza, Valle	* UNAH
El Tropezón	Fray Lázaro; Oscar Armando Molina	Caserío Fray Lázaro, municipio Choluteca, Choluteca	* Grupo folklórico ITZAE * Cuadro de Danzas Arte-Unah
El Tunal	Luis Gustavo Castellón; David Flores	Aldea El Tunal, municipio de San Esteban, Olancho	* Folklorica Arte-UNAH
La Tusa	Rafael Manzanares Aguilar	Cantarranas (now San Juan de Flores), Francisco Morazán	* Jose Cecilio del Valle, San Pedro Sula
El Xixique	Rafael Manzanares Aguilar	Cacautare, Municipio de Pespire, Choluteca	* El Instituto Doctora Jesus Aquilar Paz (2016)
Zapateado de Copal	Jesús Valladares; David Flores	Caseríos de Copal Arriba y Copal Abajo, Choluteca, Choluteca	*

=== Creole dances ===
The creole (or mestizo) dances result from the mix of indigenous and Europeans in the new world. The following are creole dances that have been authenticated by the National Office of Folklore:

Dance	Researcher	Region	Sample
Arranca Terrones	Carlos Gómez; Rubén Ruíz	Municipio de Trinidad, departamento de Santa Bárbar	* Ballet Folklórico de Honduras Oro Lenca * IORC * Ballet Folklórico de Honduras Oro Lenca
El Barreño	Rafael Manzanares Aguilar	Aldea de Lodo Colorado, Santa Rosa de Copán, Copán	* Grupo Folklórico Zots
Danza Cacautare	Auxiliadora Narváez; Tania Pinto	Aldea de Cacahutare, municipio de Pespire, Choluteca	* Escuela Republica de Italia * Instituto Renacimiento
La Cadena Guancapla	Wilberto Bonilla Ríos	Aldea Agua Blanca, municipio San Miguel Guancapla, departamento Intibuca	*
El Cascareño	Rubén Ruiz	Dulce Nombre de Copán, Copán	* Colegio Rafael Pineda Ponce * Escuela Alba Nora
La Chunga (El Baile de María Jesús)	Wilberto Bonilla Ríos	Aldeas Nueva Experanza, Chiligatoro, Azacualpa, y otras, municipio La Esperanza, Intibucá	* Instituto Juventud Triniteca
La Colosuca			* Instituto Gregorio A Consuegra De Ajuterique * ARTE-UNAH
La Correa	Rafael Manzanares Aguilar	Aldea de Cacaurtare, municipio de Pespire, Choluteca	* Azacualpa Danza La Correa * Instituto San José, Progresso
El Corrido a las Chapias	David Flores; Luis Gustavo Catellón	Aldea de El Tunal, municipio de San Esteban, Olancho	* Corporación Folklórica Usula
El Cututeo Rápida	Rubén Ruíz	Municipio de Yoro, Yoro	* Brigadas de Amor Cristiano, Choluteca
El Destro	David Adolfo Flores Valladares; Luís Gustavo Castellón; Erika Cecilia Cuellar	Municipality of San Esteban, originated in municipality of Gualaco, department of Olancho	* Instituto de 5 de Noviembre Teupasenti
El Destro Ojos Negros		Municipio de San Esteban, Olancho	* Grupo Folklórico Zots
El Destrocón	Luís Gustavo Castellón; Leny Padilla; Juan Pablo Valladares; José Ramón Borjas	Aldeas de las Flores y La Jagua en el municipio de San Esteban, Olancho	* Grupo Folklórico del Instituto Polivalente San Esteban * Instituto Polivalente de San Esteban Olancho
El Distro (y de influencia indígena)	Wilberto Bonilla Ríos; Allan Mauricio Castro Vasquez	Aldea Las Delicias, municipio Santiago de Puringla, departamento La Paz	* Cuadro Nacional de Danzas Folklóricas de Honduras y El Grupo Lanceros
La Duyureña	Oscar Armando Guevara; Rosa Argentina Rueda; Daniela de Bustillo	Municipio de Duyure, Choluteca	* Escuela Normal Valle De Sula * Ballet Folklórico Raíces Marcalinas
El Esquipuleño	David Adolfo Flores; Luís Gustavo Castellón; Erika Cecilia Cuellar	Caserío de Casas Viejas, municipio de Guanaca, Olancho	* El Esquipuleño * Escuela Tomas Alverez Dolmo
La Farifumba	Wilberto Bonilla Ríos	Aldea Agua Blanca, municipio San Miguel Guancapla, departamento of Intibucá	* Ballet Folklórico de Honduras Oro Lenca
Frente a la Guatalera	Oscar Armando Guevara; Jesús Valladares	Sur de Honduras	* Instituto José Cecilio Del Valle, de Choluteca * Inst. Miguel Mejia Ortega
La Guanesteña	Everth Zelaya	Catacamas, Olancho	* La Guanesteña * La Guanesteña * Cuadro de danzas de 3-1 * Ballet Folklórico de Honduras Oro Lenca
El Guapango Chorotega	Rafael Manzanares Aguilar	Linaca, Choluteca	* Ballet Folklórico de Honduras Oro Lenca (2017) * Universidad Pedagógica Nacional Francisco Morazán (2014)
El Guapango del Río	Tania Pinto de Morán	Caserío de Jocomico, Choluteca	* Cuadro folkloSUL * Arte UNAH
El Jutiquile	Rafael Manzanares Aguilar	Jutikile, Olancho, Olancho	* Danzas Folkloricas ARTE-UNAH
Los Lirios	Diógenes Orlando Álvarez Rodas; Nectalí Cáceres	Aldea los Lirios, municipio de Yoro, Yoro	* Grupo Folklorico Itzamná-Honduras * Cuadro de el ITAF
Macheteado Musical	Wilberto Bonilla Ríos	Municipio de La Esperanza, Intibucá	* Inst. San José * Leon Alvarado
El Palito Verde	Carlos Gómez; Rubén Ruiz	Trinidad, Departamento de Santa Bárbara	* Ballet Folklórico de Honduras Oro Lenca * Cuadro Municipal de Danzas La Unión Olancho
El Palito Verde de Guancapla	Wilberto Bonilla Ríos	Aldea Agua Blanca, municipio San Miguel Guancapla, departamento of Intibucá	* Ballet Folklórico de Honduras Oro Lenca * Jesus Aguilar Paz
Las Peinetas	Wilberto Bonilla Ríos Marcio Suazo Izaguirre	Marcala, Departamento de La Paz	* Inst. San José * Las Peinetas * Arte-UNAH
La Picoteña	Tania Pinto de Morán; Sara Emilia de Mendoza de Ordóñez	El Pedrero, municipio Pavana, Choluteca	* Ballet Folklórico de Honduras Oro Lenca * Escuela Bilingüe Honduras * Inst Rafael Pineda Ponce
La Piunga	David Adolfo Flores Valladares; Antonio Bonilla; Colaboración de: Raúl Alvarado, Justiniano Reyes; Walter Troches.	Aldea El Ocotillo, municipio de Aranda, Santa Bárbara, y aldeas aledañas	*
La Polca Corrida (o Brisas del aire)	Tania Pinto de Morán	Aldea de San Ramón, caserío de Linaca, Departamento de Choluteca	* Cuadro Nacional de Danzas Folklóricas de Honduras * Representantes de la Zona 2 en el IV Multifestival Diocesano 2011 * Ballet Folklórico de Honduras Oro Lenca
La Polca de la Enea	Oscar Guevara	Aldea La Enea, municipio de Morolica, Choluteca	* UNAH * Escuela República de Italia
Polca Los Manguitos	Wilberto Bonilla Ríos	La Esperanza, Intibucá	* Instituto Jesus Aguilar Paz de Tegucigalpa * Iinstituto Manuel Pagan Lozano * Instituto Jesus Aguilar Paz de Tegucigalpa * Inst. Gabino Vásquez Argueta
Polca de María Luisa	Ramón Fúnez; Alba Hernández; Leonor Galeano	Aldea de Las Quebradas, municipio de Talanga, Francisco Morazán	* Instituto Dr. Jorge Fidel Durón * inst. Fidel duron
La Polca Marcada	David Adolfo Flores; Luís Castellón; Erica Cecilia Cuellar	Aldea Las Limas y La Venta, municipio de San Esteben, o municipio de Guanaco	* Inst. Jesus Aguilar Paz * Cuadro De Danzas Arte UNAH
Polca de La Novia	Oscar Armando Molina,	Aldea del Espinal, municipio de Pespire, Choluteca	*
Polca del Plato	Luis Gustavo Castellón; Leny Padilla; Juan Pablo Valladares	Municipio de San Esteban, Olancho	* Polca del Plato
La Polka de Rosa	Tania Pinto de Moran; José Armando; María del Pilar; Roberto Antonio Moran	Jocomico, Palo Herrado, Copal, Santa Elena y demás caseríos aledaños, Choluteca	* ASOHA (YUM KAAX) * Representantes de la zona 1 en el Multi Diocesano 2011 de la Parroquia Santisima Trinidad de Chamelecon
La Polca Sanjuaneña	Tania Pinto de Morán	Aldea de San Juan Bautista, municipio de Pespire, Choluteca	* Escuela La Democracia de La Libertad Comayagua * [Inst. Presentación Centeno Inst. Jorge Fidel Duron de San Francisco de Yojoa, Cortes]
La Polka Sislaba			* Cuadro de Danzas Itzayana Tocoa Colon
Raíces de los Castellanos o Corrido de las Fichas	David Adolfo Flores Valladares; Maria del Carmen Contreras	Ciudad del Progreso, Departamento de Yoro	* INBAC (2015) * Grupo Folklórico Danzantes * Inst. Jorge Fidel Duron
La Rana	Ricardo Rodriguez	Pueblo de Linaca, Choluteca	* Instituto Matilde Córdova de Suazo * Instituto Jose Trinidad Reyes * Escuela Aurora
El Revuelto	Rafael Manzanares Aguilar	Aldea de San Martín, departamento de Chuleteca	* Grupo Folklorico Azacualpa
El Suspiro	David Flores; Gustavo Castellón	Caserío de Tonjagua, aldea Las Limas, municipio de San Esteban, Olancho	* la Escuela Miguel Paz Barahona de San Francisco Yojoa
La Tronconera	Marvin Moreno; Jairo Exau Alvarez; Thania Pinto de Moran	Aldea la Galera, municipio del Corpus, departamento de Choluteca	* Danza la Tronconera Instituto Cardenal Oscar Andres * ARTE-UNAH
Vals destro (o El Palito Verde de Intibucá)	Wilberto Bonilla Ríos	Aldea Nueva Esperanza, municipio La Esperanza, departamento Intibucá	* Instituto 5 de noviembre Teupasenti
El Xungui-Xungui	Alan Castro	municipality Opatoro, department La Paz	* Jesus Aguilar Paz
El Zapateado (Dance of the Machetes)	Rafael Manzanares Aguilar	Aldea de San Martín, Choluteca	* Cuadro de Danza Instituto Tecnologico Santo Tomas * Competencia Nacional * Inst. Perla del Ulúa, Progresso
El Zapateado Paceño	Wilberto Bonilla Ríos	Municipio de San Juan, La Paz	* Ballet Folklórico de Honduras Oro Lenca (Virginia) * Ballet Folklórico de Honduras Oro Lenca (Parque, La Esperanza) * Instituto San José de El Progreso, Yoro
La Zarandita	Ricardo Felipe Rodríguez; Sara Emelia Mendoza de Ordóñez	Aldea La Picota, municipio Choluteca, departamento Coluteca	* Academia Interamericano Meridon * Grupo Proyeccion Folclorica Celaque

=== Imitative Creole dances ===
These dances have movements characteristic of animals and also of some activities like fairs, bullfights, frights, flights of birds, and hunts.

Dance	Researcher	Region	Sample
Los Caballitos	Rafael Manzanares Aguilar	Yoro, Yoro	* Ballet Folklórico de Honduras Oro Lenca
El Caballón	Ramón Cecilio Fúnez; Alba Gladis de Hernández; Leonor Galeano	Aldea Las Quebradas, municipio de Talanga, Francisco Morazán	*
La Coyota	Rafael Manzanares Aguilar	La Esperanza, Intibucá	
La Galopa	Carlos Gómez G. Rubén Ruiz	Pespire, departamento de Choluteca.	* ARTE-UNAH * Escuela Ramón Rosa, San Pedro Sula
El Garroba	Oscar Armando Guevara Molina	La aldea de Cacautare, municipio de pespire Departamento de Choluteca.	* El Garroba * Taller de danzas folklóricas 2015
El Gavilán	Oscar Armando Guevara Molina	Aldea de Cacautare, Pespire, Choluteca	* Arte-UNAH * Eenpm
El Torito Pinto	Rafael Manzanares Aguilar	La Esperanza, Intibucá; Alianza, Valle	* UNAH
El Zopilote	Rafael Manzanares Aguilar	Yuscarán, El Paraíso.	* instituto Leon Alvarado de Comayagua (2010) * El Zopilote

=== Colonial dances ===
The dances originating from Spanish colonial influences, which have been assimilated by the people without losing their traditional essence.

Dance	Researcher	Region	Sample
El Callado	Rafael Manzanares Aguilar	San Francisco, San Marcos de Colon, Choluteca	
El Chotis	Wilberto Bonilla Ríos	Ciudad de Comayagua, Comayagua	* Instituto Leon Alvarado de Comayagua
La Cuadrilla de la Reina		Ciudad de Comayagua, Comayagua	* Escuela Rosa de Valenzuela * Instituto San Jose de El Progreso, Yoro * Ballet folklórico San José 2017
La Espinaleña	Carlos Gómez; Rubén Ruiz	Aldea El Espinal, municipio de Pespire, Departamento de Choluteca	* Escuela La Democracia en el Gran Pereke 2016 * ARTE-UNAH
El Jarabe Yoreño	Rafael Manzanares Aguilar	Municipio de Victoria, Yoro	* Leon Alvarado (2012)
El Junco	Wilberto Bonilla Ríos	Chuloteca, Chuloteca	* Instituto Angel Augusto Castillo, de Las Lajas, Comayagua * Grupo Folklorico Carlos Villalvir * Grupo los Xatruch
Los Lanceros	David Adolfo Flores; Luis Gustavo Castellón; Estela Gaekel de Ruiz	Ciudad de Comayagua, Comayagua	* Instituto Leon Alvarado de Comayagua
La Lluvia	Jose Rafael Flores Bonilla	Choluteca, Depto de Choluteca	* (buscando video)
La Mazurka	Rafael Manzanares Aguilar	Se bailo a inicios del siglo 1900 en los amplios Salones de la Alcaldía Municipal de Tegucigalpa.	* Instituto Católico San Jose de El Progreso, Yoro * Instituto Técnico Federico C. Canales
El Pereke	Rafael Manzanares Aguilar	Caserio de Santa Teresa, El Triunfo, Choluteca	* Grupo Jade * Instituto Jesus Aguilar Paz de Tegucigalpa Egresados (2014)
Polca de los Hatillos de la Castaña	Auxiliadora Narváez Sandra de Núñez	Cerros La Picota, San Francisco, Los Encuentros y El Trapiche, en la región de Pavana, jurisdicción de Choluteca, Choluteca	* La Escuela La Democracia * ENCA de Comayagua
Polca la San Juaneña	Tania Pinto Ramos de Moran; Auxiliadora Narváez	Aldea San Juan Bautista, municipio Pespire, Choluteca	* Instituto Técnico Comalhuacán * Instituto Jorge Fidel Duron de San Francisco de Yojoa, Cortes
Polca Volada o Deslizada		Cacerio Coyolar, La Panta y Bañaderos, Municipio De San Esteban, Olancho	* Grupo Folklorico San Ramón * La Polka Volada
La Varsoviana	Pompilio Ortega(?), Oficina del Folklore Nacional	Ciudad de Comayagua, Comayagua	* Escuela La Democracia de La Libertad, Comayagua * Instituto San Jose, El Grande de Grandes 2015 * Ballet Folklórico de Honduras Oro Lenca

== Honduran folklorists ==
- Henry Leonel Andean (Researcher and collector of dances like El corridito, El corrido de Don Juan, "The Polka of Apakunka" and "The dance of the Junquillo", Director of the Group Yaxall of Honduras)
- Carlos Gómez Genizzotti
- Professor Diógenes Orlando Álvarez Rodas (Choreographer and Investigator) Dances like Los Lirios (The Lilies), El Danzón and La campesina (The Peasant Woman), among others
- Doctor Jesús Aguilar Paz (music and folk habits)
- Jesús Muñoz Tábora (director of the department of the National Folklore in the 80's)
- Jorge Montenegro — Compilation of tales and national legends
- Luis Castellón (collected dances such as: Destrocon, Polca of the dish, for example)
- Professor Pompilio Ortega
- Rafael Manzanares Aguilar — Honduran folklorist, author and musical composer; founder and first director of the National Office of Folklore of Honduras (Oficina del Folklore Nacional de Honduras); founder and first director and choreographer of the Cuadro de Danzas Folklóricas de Honduras.
- Rafael Rubio
- Sebastián Martínez Rivera (writer on Honduran folklore)
- Tania Pinto de Moran (Folcloróloga National)
- Wilberto Allan Bonilla Rios — Collected dances such as: La pulgita (The Little Flea), Arranca terrones de Nueva Esperanza (Pull up the clods of Nuevo Esperanza), and Peineta (Comb), among others
- David Adolfo Flores Valladares — Folklorist and innovator in Honduran folk dance
- Johann Seren Castillo — Director of Ballet Folklórico de Honduras Oro Lenca

== See also ==
- Culture of Honduras
- Lencan Mythology
- Folklore
- Literature of Honduras
- Education in Honduras
- Ethnic groups of Honduras
- Art in Honduras
- Gastronomy of Honduras
- Music in Honduras
