= Cabañas, La Paz =

Cabañas
- Municipality and village
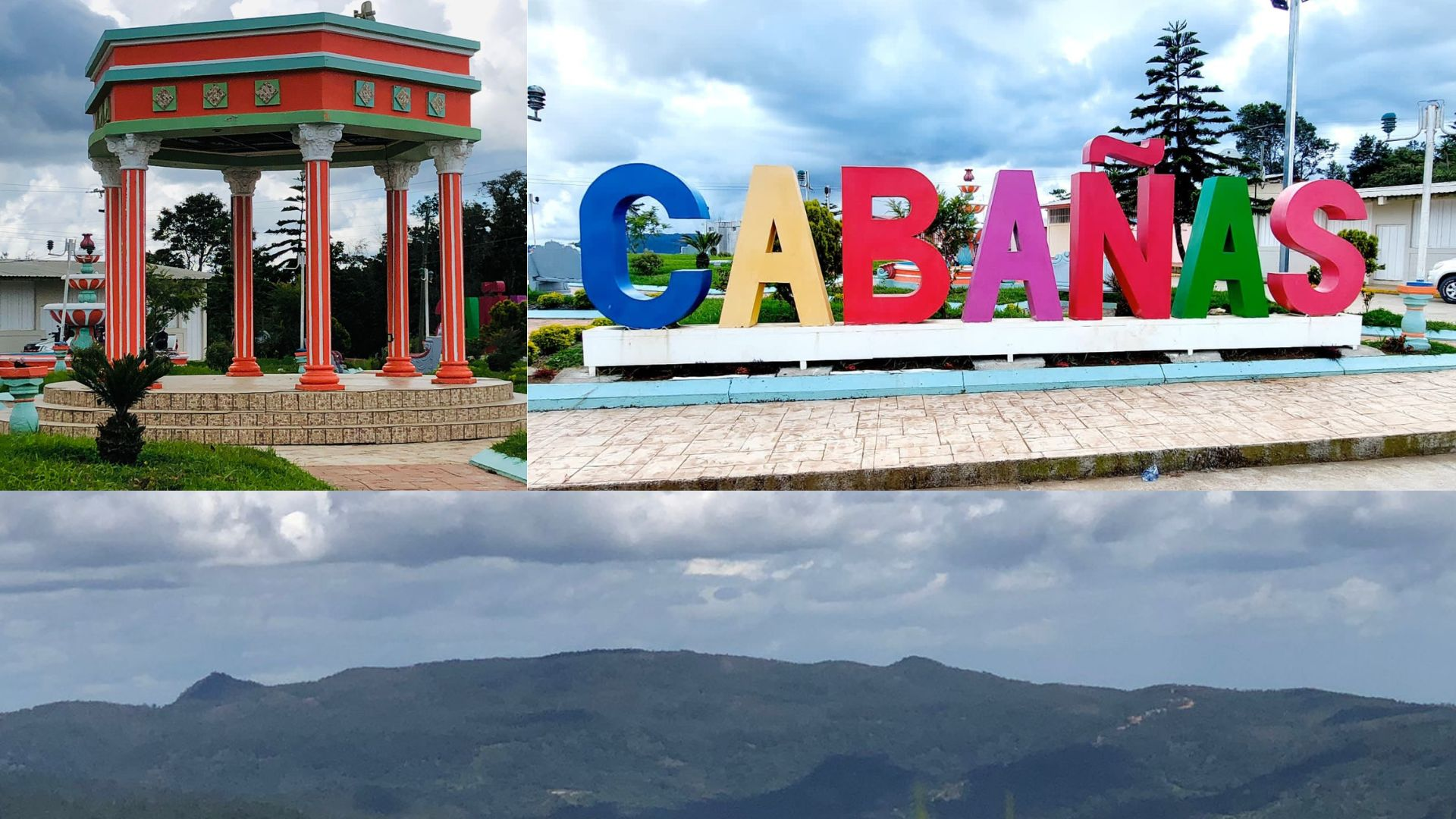

- Location in Honduras
- Coordinates: 14°3′N 88°0′W
- Country: Honduras
- Department: La Paz

Area
  - Total: 155.6 km^{2} (60.1 sq mi)

Population (2015)
  - Total: 3,408
  - Density: 21.90/km^{2} (56.73/sq mi)

Cabañas is a village and municipality in the Honduran department of La Paz, situated in the southwest of the country, with the principal village 17.1 kilometres (10.6 mi) by road south of Marcala, surrounded by the Ocote Seco and Valle Nuevo hills. The municipality covers an area of 155.6 square kilometres (60.1 sq mi) and contains four other villages: Azacualpa, El Bailadero, El Palmar and Las Lajitas, and 47 hamlets. As of 2015 it had a population of 3408.

Cabañas is a producer of grains, sugarcane and coffee, bananas, mangoes, and is engaged in cattle and poultry farming. Its patronal festival is the day of Our Lady of Candelaria, held on 2 February.

== History ==
Cabañas is named after General José Trinidad Cabañas. At the time of the ecclesiastical census of 1791, it was documented as a village of the curacy of Cururú, under the name "Similatón". At the time of the 1825 census it was a parish in Goascorán district. It was incorporated as a municipality of its own right on 9 March 1897, during the presidency of Policarpo Bonilla, and has been known as "Cabañas" since then.

== Geography ==
Cabañas is a large village and municipality covering an area of 155.6 square kilometres (60.1 sq mi) in the La Paz Department of southwest Honduras. Surrounded by the Ocote Seco and Valle Nuevo hills, by road it is 17.1 kilometres (10.6 mi) south of Marcala, and 11.7 kilometres (7.3 mi) southwest of Cacauterique. Municipally, Cabañas borders Marcala and Santa Ana to the north, Santa Ana and the country of El Salvador to the south, Santa Ana to the east, and Marcala and El Salvador to the west." The municipality contains four other villages: Azacualpa, El Bailadero, El Palmar and Las Lajitas, and 47 hamlets. The average elevation is 1,847 metres (6,060 ft) above sea level.

== Demographics ==
At the time of the 2013 Honduras census, La Paz municipality had a population of 3,253. Of these, 85.93% were Indigenous (85.89% Lenca), 12.40% Mestizo, 0.86% Black or Afro-Honduran, 0.56% White and 0.25% others.

== Economy ==
The municipality is a producer of grains, sugarcane, coffee, bananas, mangoes, and vegetables, and is involved in cattle and poultry farming.

== Landmarks ==
The main village of Cabañas contains a central park, the Estadio Municipal Beltran Garcia, and a church, Iglesia Bautista Missions Door.

== Culture ==
The patronal festival of Cabañas is the day of Our Lady of Candelaria, held on 2 February.
