= Honduran Lenca =

Language of Honduras

Honduran Lencan
- Kotik
- Native to: Honduras, El Salvador
- Ethnicity: Lenca people
- Extinct: by 1974
- Language family: Lencan: Honduran Lencan
- Dialects: Western; Central; Eastern; Southern

Language codes
- ISO 639-3: (covered by len Lenca)
- Glottolog: lenc1242
- ELP: Honduran Lenca

Honduran Lenca is a language that was spoken with minor dialect differences in Intibuca, Opatoro, Guajiquiro (Huajiquiro), Similatón (modern Cabañas), and Santa Elena. The name can be misleading; although primarily spoken in Honduras, it was also spoken in El Salvador close to the Honduran border. It is distantly related to Salvadoran Lenca.

Honduran Lenca can be divided into four dialects: western (Intibuca), central (Santa Elena, Chinacla), eastern (Guajiquiro, Opatoro), and southern (Similaton).

== Phonology ==
=== Consonants ===
	Labial	Alveolar	Palatal	Velar
Nasal	m	n		
Plosive	p	t		k
Fricative		s	ʃ	
Lateral		l		
Rhotic		r		
Glide	w		j	

- Stops /p, t, k/ in word-medial and word-final positions may occasionally be heard as voiced [b, d, ɡ]. /p, k/ may also be fricated as [β, ɣ] in these positions as well.
- /n/ can be heard as velar [ŋ] when preceding /k/, a pause, or an onset vowel.
- /p, k/ in word-final position may also occasionally be pronounced as [f, h].
- A glottal stop [ʔ] may be heard after a word-final vowel.

=== Vowels ===
	Front	Back
Close	i	u
Mid	e	o
Open	a	

The basic syllable structure is CVC. It is hypothesized that earlier forms of the language had a CV structure, but shifted towards CVC through final vowel deletion. Stress is poorly documented, but is thought to have been syllable final.

== Morphology ==
The following overview is based on King (2017).

=== Verbs ===
Finite verbs are obligatorily suffixed for subject.

Below lies the conjugation of the verb molik:

Indicative	Translation	Interrogative	Translation	Volitive	Translation
moliuna	I speak; I spoke	moltu	Do I speak?	molmi	I want to speak; I shall speak
molyêm	You speak; you spoke (singular)	moltam	Do you speak? (singular)	molta	Speak! (singular)
molina	He/she speaks; he/she spoke	molti	Does he/she speak?	moliu	Let him/her speak
molpil	We speak; we spoke	n/a		molmal	Let's speak
molkil	You speak; you spoke (plural)	n/a		moltal	Speak! (plural)
mollana	They speak; they spoke	n/a		moliu	Let them speak

There is some variation in some of the endings; for instance, -tam also appears as -tami and -l as -li. -Una may have had an alternate form -on.

Gerunds are formed with the suffix -k or -ik, and participles with the suffix -n or -in. Whether the suffix form uses i depends on whether the stem ends in a consonant or vowel.

There are two verbs, wak and lak that more or less correspond to Spanish ser and estar. They can be used as auxiliary verbs: lak can be used after the gerund to produce the present continuous aspect (e.g., molik laina "He/she is speaking"), and wak can be used after the participle to produce the perfective aspect (e.g., molin ina "He/she has spoken"). There is a future construction formed by using pelak as an auxiliary verb after the stem, e.g., mol pelaina "He/she will speak". There is an alternate future tense which may have been formed from a contraction of the auxiliary future construction, and here would take the form molpena.

Negation is accomplished by inserting the particle tê in between a verb stem and the subject marker: mol-tê-ina "He/she does not speak". The suffix -on, which appears after subject endings, is thought to have had a stylistic function, perhaps indicating familiarity between interlocutors.

=== Nouns ===
Proclitics added to nouns include demonstratives and possessives (which also serve as object clitics). Enclitics include postpositions and a definite article -nan (also attested as -anan, -ana, and -na), which was common in the Guajiquiro dialect to the extent that it appears to have been unmarked, yet it is unattested in other dialects. If combined, the definite article comes before any postpositions. The possessives can be added to postpositions, functioning similarly to relational nouns. There is an optional topic marker -ne, which follows any enclitics and also functions as a postposition meaning "about". -Nan can not occur with -ne in the same noun phrase, but it can appear with the proclitics. It can also be directly added to the proclitics to form independent demonstrative and personal pronouns. Quantifiers precede enclitics.

Possessive/Object	Translation
u-	my; me
am-	your; you (singular)
i-	his/her/its; him/her/it
api-	our; us
aki-	your; you (plural)
al-	their; them

Demonstrative	Translation
na-	this
ina-	that (near)
ana-	that (far)

Postposition	Translation	Function
-ap, 'p	in, at, to	locative
-nam	from	ablative
-man	with, and	comitative
-lan	with, by	instrumental
-wei	to, for	dative
-ne	about	theme
-li	and	coordinative (with human referents)

== Syntax ==
The following overview is based on King (2017).

Noun phrase structure can be summarized as the following:

Proclitic + Noun + (Adjective) + (Quantifier) + Enclitic

Where proclitics can be either possessives or determinatives and enclitics the definite article, postpositions, the topic marker, or the short copula.

Genitive constructions are barely attested, but are assumed to have taken the order possessor-possessed, with the possession taking a possessive:

map i wewe nan
woman 3s child DEF
'the woman's child'

The unmarked word order is SOV:

Map nan shui nan ishin ina
woman DEF dog DEF see-PP be.3s
'The woman saw the dog'

However, pronominal subjects are commonly dropped:

Kotik moliuna
Lenca speak.1s
'I speak Lenca'

Topics are also frequently moved to either the beginning or end of the clause. Adjuncts are frequently topicalized.

Coordination of clauses is accomplished by using the gerund for the first clause and fully conjugating the second:

U seya nan puk u ishin ina
1s younger.brother DEF come.GER 1s see-PP be.3s
'My younger brother came and saw me'

The morpheme ikwa may be placed after the gerund:

Ushak ikwa am mol pelauna
arrive.GER ikwa 2s speak FUT.1s
'As soon as [I] arrive [here], I will tell you'

Ikwa can also coordinate nouns, and may be followed by the postposition man 'with':

Kashlan eria ikwa shui man am yêrmi
chicken four ikwa dog with 2s give-VOL.1s
'I'll give you four chickens and a dog'

The gerund has an adjunct function when followed by the topic marker nan, often a temporal function:

Ushak ne am mol pelauna
arrive.GER TOP 2s speak FUT.1s
'When [I] arrive [here], I will tell you'

Subordinate clauses are followed by subordinators such as ka or kali, and can precede or follow main clauses. A subordinate volitive clause may express purpose:

Kayu eta u yêrta u wiran umi
horse one 1s give-VOL.2s 1s town go-VOL.1s
'Give me a horse so that I may go to my village'

== Lexicon ==
Loanwords from Spanish include:

- kashlan 'hen', from castellana
- kayu 'horse', from caballo
- kushtal 'sack', from costal
- leshe 'milk', from leche
- patush 'duck', from patas
- shupu 'liquor', from chupo
- wakash 'cow', from vacas

Loanwords from Nawat include tet 'work' (noun), from Nawat tekit.
