= Chilanga =

Chilanga may refer to:

- Chilanga, El Salvador, a municipality in the Morazán Department of El Salvador
- Salvadoran Lenca, a Lencan language also known as Chilanga
- Chilanga (Lusaka), Zambia, a town 20 km south of Zambia's Capital Lusaka
- Chilanga (constituency), a parliamentary constituency in Lusaka Province, Zambia
- Chilanga District, a district in Lusaka Province, Zambia
- Chilanga, Zambia, a town in Muchinga Province, Zambia
- Chilanga Cement, a cement company based in Chilanga near Lusaka
- Female version of the Mexican demonym Chilango
