= San José, La Paz =

San José
- Municipality
- Location in Honduras
- Coordinates: 14°15′N 87°57′W
- Country: Honduras
- Department: La Paz

Area
  - Total: 64 km^{2} (25 sq mi)

Population (2015)
  - Total: 9,009
  - Density: 140/km^{2} (360/sq mi)

San José is a municipality in the Honduran department of La Paz.

== Demographics ==
At the time of the 2013 Honduras census, San José municipality had a population of 8,928. Of these, 95.12% were Indigenous (95.12% Lenca), 3.05% Mestizo, 1.39% Black or Afro-Honduran and 0.44% White.
