= Yarula =

- Municipality
- Location in Honduras
- Coordinates: 14°07′N 88°05′W
- Country: Honduras
- Department: La Paz

Area
  - Total: 94 km^{2} (36 sq mi)

Population (2015)
  - Total: 9,185
  - Density: 98/km^{2} (250/sq mi)

Yarula is a municipality in the Honduran department of La Paz.

== Demographics ==
At the time of the 2013 Honduras census, Yarula municipality had a population of 8,844. Of these, 92.05% were Indigenous (91.88% Lenca), 7.86% Mestizo, 0.05% White and 0.05% Black or Afro-Honduran.
