= Santa María, Honduras =

Santa María
- Municipality
- Location in Honduras
- Coordinates: 14°17′N 87°56′W
- Country: Honduras
- Department: La Paz

Area
  - Total: 97 km^{2} (37 sq mi)

Population
  - Total: 11,098
  - Density: 110/km^{2} (300/sq mi)

Santa María is a municipality in the Honduran department of La Paz.

== Demographics ==
At the time of the 2013 Honduras census, Santa María municipality had a population of 10,812. Of these, 97.14% were Indigenous (96.98% Lenca), 2.62% Mestizo, 0.20% Black or Afro-Honduran and 0.04% White.
