= Chinacla =

- Municipality
- Location in Honduras
- Coordinates: 14°10′N 88°0′W
- Country: Honduras
- Department: La Paz

Area
  - Total: 62 km^{2} (24 sq mi)

Population (2015)
  - Total: 8,096
  - Density: 130/km^{2} (340/sq mi)

Chinacla is a municipality in the Honduran department of La Paz.

Its populations is around 8,000 people. The main activity there is coffee, which is the principal income for the families. It is considered one of the poorest areas in the Department of La Paz. Tourist attractions include the big fall called El Chorro, there are also caves from thousand years ago. Chinacla's traditions are still preserved. The Lencas live there and have a variety of customs, some of which involve food.

== Demographics ==
At the time of the 2013 Honduras census, Chinacla municipality had a population of 7,836. Of these, 87.69% were Indigenous (87.30% Lenca), 10.75% Mestizo, 1.17% Black or Afro-Honduran, 0.28% White and 0.10% others.
