= Mercedes de Oriente =

- Municipality
- Location in Honduras
- Coordinates: 13°55′N 87°47′W
- Country: Honduras
- Department: La Paz

Area
  - Total: 38 km^{2} (15 sq mi)

Population (2015)
  - Total: 1,111
  - Density: 29/km^{2} (76/sq mi)

Mercedes de Oriente (Spanish pronunciation: [meɾˈseðes ðe oˈrjente]) is a municipality in the Honduran department of La Paz.

== Demographics ==
At the time of the 2013 Honduras census, Mercedes de Oriente municipality had a population of 1,087. Of these, 93.01% were Indigenous, 6.81% Mestizo and 0.18% Black or Afro-Honduran.
