= Santiago de Puringla =

- Municipality
- Location in Honduras
- Coordinates: 14°21′N 87°54′W
- Country: Honduras
- Department: La Paz
- Founded: 1691

Area
  - Total: 142.2 km^{2} (54.9 sq mi)

Population (2015)
  - Total: 16,583
  - Density: 116.6/km^{2} (302.0/sq mi)
- Time zone: UTC−06:00 (Time in Honduras)

Santiago de Puringla is a municipality in the Honduran department of La Paz. The municipality is situated on a plain bordered by the River Puringla. South of the municipality runs the River Lepasale.

== History ==
Puringla means 'abundance of pollen' in indigenous languages.

The original name of the community was Alguindia. In 1691, it was founded with the name Puringla and was given the categorisation of municipality in 1886. On 5 September 1921, as an act of celebration of the centenary of Independence, it was agreed to change the name to its current form.

In April 2020, the municipality suffered fires in large parts of Delicias.

== Demographics ==
At the time of the 2013 Honduras census, Santiago de Puringla municipality had a population of 16,182. Of these, 97.06% were Indigenous (96.89% Lenca), 2.71% Mestizo, 0.17% Black or Afro-Honduran and 0.06% White. In 2013, it has been estimated that the municipality's population in 2022 will be 17,867 inhabitants, of which 9,071 are men (50.77%) and 8,796 women (49.23%).

== Villages ==
Santiago de Puringla has the following ten villages:

- Cedritos
- El Higuito
- El Ocotal
- El Rancho de Jesús
- Gualazara
- Hornitos
- Las Huertas
- Las Delicias
- Ojos de Agua
- San Antonio
- Rauteca
- Matazano
