= San Pedro de Tutule =

- Municipality
- Location in Honduras
- Coordinates: 14°15′N 87°51′W
- Country: Honduras
- Department: La Paz

Area
  - Total: 45 km^{2} (17 sq mi)

Population (2015)
  - Total: 7,165
  - Density: 160/km^{2} (410/sq mi)

San Pedro de Tutule is a municipality in the Honduran department of La Paz.

== Demographics ==
At the time of the 2013 Honduras census, San Pedro de Tutule municipality had a population of 6,939. Of these, 91.73% were Mestizo, 7.91% Indigenous (7.83% Lenca), 0.20% White and 0.17% Black or Afro-Honduran.
