= Cane, La Paz =

Cane
- Municipality
- Location in Honduras
- Coordinates: 14°17′N 87°40′W
- Country: Honduras
- Department: La Paz

Area
  - Total: 45 km^{2} (17 sq mi)

Population
  - Total: 3,859
  - Density: 86/km^{2} (220/sq mi)
- 2015

Cane is a municipality in the Honduran department of La Paz.

The population of Cane is not exact, but is estimated to be around 4,000. The current mayor is Jose Tejeda, who is very popular among the community, as he has donated millions of US dollars to the creation of a lush central park stocked with trash cans, benches, and a taco bar. Tejeda is also in the process of paving the roads of Cane, which were originally all dirt.

Cane is home to one early learning center, one primary school, and one secondary school. Students who choose to attend private school have the opportunity to travel by bus about 10 minutes to the department's capital, La Paz.

== Demographics ==
At the time of the 2013 Honduras census, Cane municipality had a population of 3,592. Of these, 89.27% were Mestizo, 5.79% White, 4.17% Indigenous (4.09% Lenca) and 0.78% Black or Afro-Honduran.
