= San Antonio del Norte =

- Municipality
- Location in Honduras
- Coordinates: 13°54′N 87°41′W
- Country: Honduras
- Department: La Paz

Area
  - Total: 73 km^{2} (28 sq mi)

Population (2015)
  - Total: 2,784
  - Density: 38/km^{2} (99/sq mi)

San Antonio del Norte is a municipality in the Honduran department of La Paz.

== Demographics ==
At the time of the 2013 Honduras census, San Antonio del Norte municipality had a population of 2,725. Of these, 94.42% were Mestizo, 4.33% White, 1.03% Indigenous (0.84% Lenca) and 0.22% Black or Afro-Honduran.
