= Santa Ana, La Paz =

Santa Ana
- Municipality
- Location in Honduras
- Coordinates: 14°4′N 87°57′W
- Country: Honduras
- Department: La Paz

Area
  - Total: 198 km^{2} (76 sq mi)

Population (2015)
  - Total: 12,121
  - Density: 61.2/km^{2} (159/sq mi)

Santa Ana is a municipality in the Honduran department of La Paz, known for its high crime rate.

== Demographics ==
At the time of the 2013 Honduras census, Santa Ana municipality had a population of 11,777. Of these, 95.56% were Indigenous (95.46% Lenca), 4.25% Mestizo, 0.13% Black or Afro-Honduran and 0.06% others.
