= San Juan, La Paz =

San Juan
- Municipality
- Location in Honduras
- Coordinates: 13°58′N 87°42′W
- Country: Honduras
- Department: La Paz

Area
  - Total: 48 km^{2} (19 sq mi)

Population (2015)
  - Total: 2,508
  - Density: 52/km^{2} (140/sq mi)

San Juan is a municipality in the Honduran department of La Paz.

== Demographics ==
At the time of the 2013 Honduras census, San Juan municipality had a population of 2,447. Of these, 99.67% were Mestizo, 0.12% Indigenous, 0.12% Black or Afro-Honduran and 0.08% White.
