= Salvadoran Lenca =

Language of El Salvador

Salvadoran Lencan
- Potón
- Native to: El Salvador
- Ethnicity: Lenca people
- Native speakers: 1 (2019)
- Revival: recovery projects
- Language family: Lencan: Salvadoran Lencan
- Dialects: Chilanga †; Guatajiagua

Language codes
- ISO 639-3: (covered by len Lenca)
- Glottolog: lenc1243
- ELP: Salvadoran Lenca

Map of El Salvador's Indigenous Peoples at the time of the Spanish conquest: 1. Pipil people, 2. Lenca people, 3. Kakawira o Cacaopera, 4. Xinca, 5. Maya Ch'orti' people, 6. Maya Poqomam people, 7. Mangue o Chorotega.

Salvadoran Lenca, Chilanga or Potón is a Lencan language spoken in El Salvador, of which two dialects have been described: that of Chilanga (extinct), and that of Guatajiagua. Other dialects may have existed in the past in the other towns where the Lencas lived in present-day El Salvador.

Salvadoran Lenca belongs to the small Lencan language family, which also includes Honduran Lenca. There have been attempts to link the Lencan languages to other language families, but none have been successful. According to Adolfo Costenla Umaña, Salvadoran Lenca and Honduran Lenca separated 2,295 years ago; approximately the same time at which the archaeological site of Quelepa was founded.

== History ==
At the end of the 19th century and the beginning of the 20th century, the use of Salvadoran Lenca began to decline; in the 1970s, a speaker was found in Chilanga. At the end of the nineties, Consuelo Roque, a linguist at the University of El Salvador (UES), found Mario Salvador Hernández, a semi-speaker from Guatajiagua who had learned the language from his grandmother, and the two would together write an instructional book titled Poton piau, nuestra lengua Potón.

However, linguist Alan R. King, in his 2016 book titled Conozcamos el Lenca, una lengua de El Salvador (where he also used the Potón Piau primer as a reference), points out that: "Today no one knows how to speak Lenca, although certain individuals have memories of—or have learned—some fragments of that now lost language. This type of partial knowledge is not even remotely close, in any case that we have been able to verify, to a real mastery of the historical language, whose disappearance dates back to the mid-twentieth century...".

Research in 2004 by the University of El Salvador recorded 380 words, a phonological inventory of five vowels and 16 consonants, alternation between “g” and “k”, and reduplication to create plurals from singular forms. Currently, there are rehabilitation projects in El Salvador that aim to prevent the language from going extinct.

== Phonology ==
=== Consonants ===
Consonants in Chilanga Lenca
		Labial	Alveolar	Palatal	Velar	Glottal
Nasal		m	n			
Plosive	voiceless	p	t		k	
Plosive	ejective	pʼ	tʼ		kʼ	
Affricate			t͡sʼ	t͡ʃʼ		
Fricative			s	ʃ		h
Lateral			l			
Rhotic			r			
Glide		w		j		

Obstruents can be voiced allophonically.

=== Vowels ===
Vowels in Chilanga Lenca
	Front	Back
Close	i	u
Mid	e	o
Open	a	

== Morphology ==
The following overview is based on King (2016).

=== Pronouns ===
Person/Number	Independent pronouns	Intensive independent pronouns	Clitic pronouns
1s	unani	uno	u
2s	manani	mano	ma
3s	inani	ino	i
1p	pinani	pino	pi
2p	kinani	kino	ki
3p	anani	ano	a

Normal independent pronouns serve as the subject of a clause, but are can be dropped. The intensive independent pronouns are used for the purpose of emphasis, such as before the predicative suffix. Clitic pronouns serve as possessives when placed before nouns, direct objects before verbs, and complements before postpositions. i is used to form genitive constructions in a structure similar to other Mesoamerican languages (see Mesoamerican language area#Nominal possession). However, the order is noun2 his noun1, contrasting with many other Mesoamerican languages where the order is his noun1 noun2. For example, ishko-na i t'au (the man's house, literally "man-the his house").

=== Nouns ===
Salvadoran Lenca nouns do not inherently encode gender or number. However, these can be expressed through suffixes. -ishko and -sia qualify male and female respectively for humans, while -keu and -pere do the same for animals. -wewe acts as a diminutive.

-pa is the predicative enclitic, often corresponding in meaning to the English copula. -na is the definitive enclitic. There is no dedicated indefinite article, but the numeral pis "one" can be used with that meaning. Adjectives, numerals, quantifiers and postpositions all follow nouns. Compound nouns can be formed with the head noun coming last. Salvadoran Lenca makes an alienability distinction. Inalienable nouns, such as body parts and familial relations, must always be possessed.

=== Verbs ===
Questions are expressed without any special particles or morphemes, as in Spanish. Question words are placed before verbs and their clitic objects.

==== Present tense ====
There are three verb classes: class 1 verbs add -kon, -kanmi etc, class 2 verbs -on, -anmi, and class 3 verbs -j(i)on, -janmi. Roots of class 1 and 3 verbs end in vowels, while roots of class 2 verbs end in consonants.

	Class 1: pa (to sleep)	Class 2: pit (to fall)	Class 2: ay (to say)	Class 2: shey (to want)	Class 3: wa (to call)
1s	pakon	piton	ayon	i sheyon	i wajion
2s	pakanmi	pitanmi	ayanmi	i sheyanmi	i wajanmi
3s	pakanpa	pitanpa	ayanpa	i sheyanpa	i wajanpa
1p	pakanpi	pitanpi	ayanpi	i sheyanpi	i wajanpi
2p	pakanki	pitanki	ayanki	i sheyanki	i wajanki
3p	pakanlipa	pitanlipa	ayanlipa	i sheyanlipa	i wajanlipa

==== Participles ====
The present participle is formed by suffixing the verb root with -in if it ends in a consonant, or -in if it ends in a vowel. The past participle is formed by suffixing the verb root with -a.

==== Auxiliary verbs ====
Auxiliary verbs, placed after head verbs, are used to accomplish a variety of grammatical functions in Salvadoran Lenca:

- ke- is used to form the present negative when preceded by the present participle, but also forms the negative past when preceded by the past participle.
- kuash- (containing the root ku and the past suffixes), placed after the present participle, is used as apparently the most common way to form the negative past.
- peash-, placed after a verb stem, achieves the meaning "already" without distinction in tense.
- shika- (preterite of yan "to be") is used in imperfect constructions, as well as appearing after negative verbs to produce the negative past.

These auxiliary verbs are not conjugated like regular verbs, but instead the above stems are directly suffixed with the following endings:

Person/Number	Suffix
1s	-u
2s	-mi
3s	-pa
1p	-pi
2p	-ki
3p	-lipa

o- ("to go"), placed after a verb stem, is the most common way to form the future. Unlike the other auxiliary verbs, it is conjugated like a regular class 1 verb, though when used as a future auxiliary an initial k is usually added:

Person/Number	Conjugation
1s	kokon
2s	kokanmi
3s	kokanpa
1p	kokanpi
2p	kokanki
3p	kokanlipa

Additionally, pala ("go!") and pila ("come!") are used as directional imperatives after the present participle.

==== Past tense ====
The main past tense is formed by adding suffixes like -ash-, -aj-, -a-, or a null suffix, followed by the same person suffixes used in the present tense.

Number/Person	erch'i (to break; transitive)	shuray (to sing)	liwa (to buy)	pat'iwa (to dream)	aya (to say)	ami (to sell; transitive)	o (to go)
1s	i erch'iashu	shurayashu	i liwashu	pat'iwaju	ayau	i amiu	aju
2s	i erch'iashmi	shurayashmi	i liwashmi	pat'iwajmi	ayami	i amimi	ajmi
3s	i erch'iashpa	shurayashpa	i liwashpa	pat'iwajpa	ayapa	i amipa	ajpa
1p	i erch'iashpi	shurayashpi	i liwashpi	pat'iwajpi	ayapi	i amipi	ajpi
2p	i erch'iashki	shurayashki	i liwashki	pat'iwajki	ayaki	i amiki	ajki
3p	i erch'iashlipa	shurayashlipa	i liwashlipa	pat'iwajlipa	ayalipa	i amilipa	ajlipa

==== Future ====
Although the future is usually expressed through the present tense or through the auxiliary verb o "to go", some verbs normally express the future through a series of suffixes:

Person/Number	Future suffix
1s	-shon
2s	-shanmi
3s	-shanpa
1p	-shanpi
2p	-shanki
3p	-shanlipa

==== Imperative ====
The second person singular imperative for class 1 verbs is formed by adding the suffix -ka, while for class 2 and 3 verbs, it is formed with the suffix -a. The suffixes -pa or -mi/-yemi (the last two being freely interchangeable) can be added to the singular imperative in order to form the plural or negative imperative, respectively. Irregular imperatives include on pala/unpala "go", i kopila "bring it", and mapila "come".

== Lexicon ==
Salvadoran Lenca has borrowed words from both Spanish and Nawat.

=== Loanwords from Spanish ===
- kayu "horse", from caballo
- masti "machete", from machete
- moso "Ladino", from mozo
- ora "hour", from hora

=== Loanwords from Nawat ===
- kotan "mountain", from kojtan
- mistu "cat", from mistun
- shikal "jar", from shikal
- shikit "basket", from chikiwit
- wat "reed", from uat
- nepal "tongue", possibly from nenepil
- suat "hat", possibly from suyat
- sia "woman", possibly from siwat

=== Loanwords of uncertain etymology ===
- patush "duck", ultimately from Spanish patos but possibly borrowed through Nawat patush
- wakash "cow", ultimately from Spanish vacas but possibly borrowed through Nawat wakash
- tumi "money", ultimately from Spanish tomín but possibly borrowed through Nawat tumin
- kashlan "hen", ultimately from Spanish castellana but possibly borrowed through an indigenous language other than Nawat (compare Nawat tijlan)
- tomati "tomato", possibly borrowed through Spanish tomate instead of directly from Nawat tumat
