= Roberto Castillo (philosopher) =

Honduran philosopher and writer

Roberto Castillo (1950–2008) was a Honduran philosopher and writer.

A 2002 novel by Roberto Castillo, La guerra mortal de los sentidos, chronicles the adventures of the "Searcher for the Lenca Language."
