= Sherrie Arzú =

Honduras footballer

Personal information
- Full name: Sherrie May Arzú Beans
- Date of birth: 8 June 1991 (age 35)
- Place of birth: Trujillo, Colón, Honduras
- Position: Goalkeeper

Team information
- Current team: Xelajú
- Number: 49

Senior career*
Years	Team	Apps	(Gls)
- Sacachispas
2021–	Xelajú		

International career^{‡}
2021–	Honduras	7	(0)
- * Club domestic league appearances and goals ‡ National team caps and goals as of 13 April 2022

Sherrie May Arzú Beans (born 1 May 2002) is a Honduran footballer who plays as a goalkeeper for Xelajú and the Honduras women's national team.

== Club career ==
=== Sacachispas ===
In December 2017, Arzú helped Sacachispas to win the 2017 Apertura of the National Women's Football League of Guatemala in a 4–0 aggregate victory over Unifut Rosal.

=== Club Xelajú MC ===
In April 2021, Arzú signed with Club Xelajú MC. The following June, she played in the final as the team won the 2021 Clausura of the National Women's Football League of Guatemala.

In June 2022, Arzú spoke out against racist insults directed at her during Xelajú's semi-final clash with Unifut Rosal. The latter club was subsequently fined by the league.

== Honours ==
Sacachispas

- Liga Nacional de Fútbol Femenino de Guatemala: 2017 Apertura

Club Xelajú MC

- Liga Nacional de Fútbol Femenino de Guatemala: 2021 Clausura
