= Opatoro =

- Municipality
- Location in Honduras
- Coordinates: 14°05′N 87°54′W
- Country: Honduras
- Department: La Paz

Area
  - Total: 241 km^{2} (93 sq mi)

Population (2015)
  - Total: 7,572
  - Density: 31.4/km^{2} (81.4/sq mi)

Opatoro is a municipality in the Honduran department of La Paz.

== Demographics ==
At the time of the 2013 Honduras census, Opatoro municipality had a population of 7,408. Of these, 91.90% were Indigenous (91.77% Lenca), 7.33% Mestizo, 0.55% White, 0.18% Black or Afro-Honduran and 0.03% others.
