= Jesús Aguilar Paz =

Honduran chemist (1895–1974)

Jesús Aguilar Paz (15 October 1895 in Gualala, Santa Bárbara Department – 26 June 1974 in Tegucigalpa) was a Honduran chemist, pharmacist, cartographer, folklorist and teacher.

In 1915, he was appointed Secretary of the Escuela Normal de Occidente in the city of La Esperanza, Intibucá, where he was later appointed deputy director. Between 1915 and 1933 he made extensive trips around the country, taking sketches and making notes, which would become the subject of several books. In 1931 he published Tradiciones y leyendas de Honduras (Traditions and legends of Honduras) and in 1933 he published the official general map of the municipalities of Honduras, Mapa General de la República de Honduras. He was a member and editor of the Sociedad de Geografía e Historia de Honduras journal. From 1950 to 1953 he was Dean of the Faculty of Chemistry and Pharmacy of the National University of Honduras. In 1947, he published a book on chemistry, Interpretación química y Ley Periódica Universal.
