= Lauterique =

- Municipality
- Location in Honduras
- Coordinates: 13°51′N 87°40′W
- Country: Honduras
- Department: La Paz

Area
  - Total: 35 km^{2} (14 sq mi)

Population
  - Total: 3,021
  - Density: 86/km^{2} (220/sq mi)

Lauterique is a municipality in the Honduran department of La Paz.

== Demographics ==
At the time of the 2013 Honduras census, Lauterique municipality had a population of 2,986. Of these, 99.80% were Mestizo, 0.13% Indigenous and 0.07% White.
