= Liga Nacional Femenina =

Highest division of league competition for Guatemalan women's football

- Founded: 1997
- Country: Guatemala
- Confederation: CONCACAF
- Number of clubs: 16 (2011)
- Level on pyramid: 1
- International cup: UNCAF Women's Interclub Championship
- Current champions: Unifut Rosal (Clausura 2019)
- Most championships: Unifut Rosal (16 titles)
- Broadcaster(s): Tigo Sports; Facebook
- Website: www.guatefutfem.com/lf/
- Current: 2025–26 Liga Nacional Femenina

The National Women's Football League of Guatemala or Liga Nacional de Fútbol Femenino de Guatemala is the top level women's football league in Guatemala. The league was first played in the 1997 season. Record champions are Comunicaciones with six titles.

== Competition format ==
An annual competition was play out from 1997/98 to 2007/08, when and Apertura and Clausura format was adopted. Now after the regular season, play-offs are played.

There is a constant change of teams in the league, as 13 clubs became insolvent just between 2008 and the beginning of 2011 and had to withdraw from the league.

== Champions ==
The list of champions:

Annual champions:

Year	Champions
1997/98	Comunicaciones (unofficial)
1998/99	Comunicaciones
1999/00	Comunicaciones
2000/01	Comunicaciones
2001/02	Comunicaciones
2002/03	Comunicaciones
2003/04	La Gomera
2004/05	Monjas Jalapa
2005/06	Juventus
2006/07	Comunicaciones
2007/08	Amatitlán

Apertura and clausura champions.

Year	Apertura champions (ends in winter)	Clausura champions (ends in summer)
2008/09	Seysa Chimaltenango	Seysa Chimaltenango
2009/10	Seysa Chimaltenango	Unifut
2010/11	Unifut	Unifut
2011/12	Unifut	Unifut
2012/13	Unifut	Jutiapanecas Rosal
2013/14	Unifut	Jutiapanecas Rosal
2014/15	Unifut	Unifut
2015/16	Unifut	Unifut
2016/17	Unifut	Xela
2017/18	Unifut	Unifut
2018/19	Unifut	Unifut
2019/20	Unifut	Canceled due to the COVID-19 pandemic
2020/21	Xela	Xela
2021/22	Unifut	Suchitepequez
2022/23	Suchitepequez	Unifut
2023/24	Xinabajul	Unifut
2024/25	Municipal	Municipal
2025/26	Cuilco	?

=== Top goalscorers ===
Season	Player	Team	Goals
2012-13 Apertura	(El Salvador) Damaris Quélez	Jutiapanecas	30

== Titles by team ==
Number of wins, not including the 1997/98 season.

Titles	Team
20	Unifut Rosal
7	Comunicaciones
3	Seysa Chimaltenango
3	Xela
2	Suchitepequez
2	Jutiapanecas Rosal
1	La Gomera
1	Monjas Jalapa
1	Juventus
1	Amatitlán
1	Xinabajul
1	Municipal

== See also ==
- Football in Guatemala – overview of football sport
- Women's association football around the world
