= Santa Elena, Honduras =

Santa Elena
- Municipality
- Location in Honduras
- Coordinates: 14°5′N 88°7′W
- Country: Honduras
- Department: La Paz

Area
  - Total: 164 km^{2} (63 sq mi)

Population (2015)
  - Total: 12,658
  - Density: 77.2/km^{2} (200/sq mi)

Santa Elena is a municipality in the Honduran department of La Paz.

== Demographics ==
At the time of the 2013 Honduras census, Santa Elena municipality had a population of 12,162. Of these, 92.06% were Indigenous (92.02% Lenca), 7.79% Mestizo, 0.11% Black or Afro-Honduran, 0.01% White, and 0.02% others.
