= La Paz Department (Honduras) =

La Paz Department Departamento de La Paz
- Department
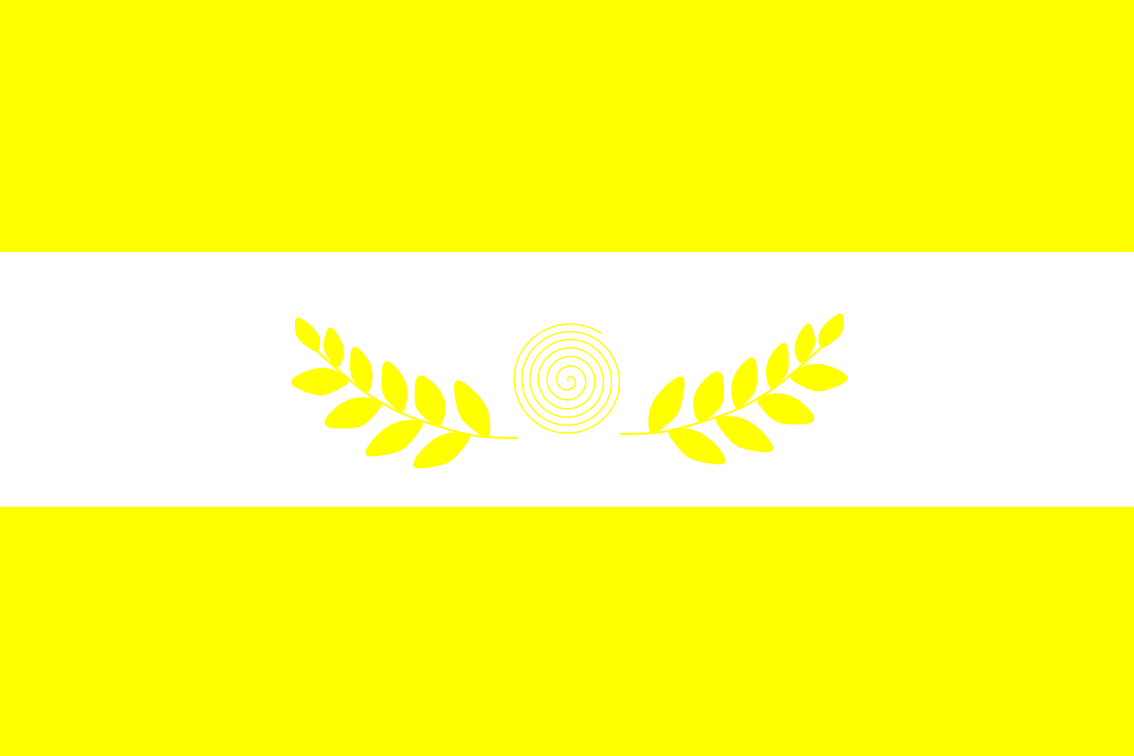
- Flag

- Location of La Paz in Honduras
- Coordinates: 14°20′N 87°41′W
- Country: Honduras
- Municipalities: 19
- Villages: 116
- Founded: 28 May 1869
- Capital city: La Paz

Government
  - Type: Departmental
  - Governor: Dr. Robinson Banegas (2022-2026) (LibRe)

Area
  - Total: 2,534 km^{2} (978 sq mi)

Population (2015)
  - Total: 206,065
  - Density: 81.32/km^{2} (210.6/sq mi)

GDP (Nominal, 2015 US dollar)
  - Total: $0.5 billion (2023)
  - Per capita: $1,900 (2023)

GDP (PPP, 2015 int. dollar)
  - Total: $1.1 billion (2023)
  - Per capita: $3,900 (2023)
- Time zone: UTC-6 (CDT)
- Postal code: 15101, 15201
- ISO 3166 code: HN-LP
- HDI (2021): 0.594 medium · 8th of 18
- Statistics derived from Consult INE online database: Population and Housing Census 2013

La Paz (Spanish pronunciation: [la pas]) is one of the 18 political and geographic departments of Honduras. The departmental capital is the city of La Paz.

The department covers a total surface area of 2,331 km^{2} (900 sq mi). In 2015, it had an estimated population of 206,065.

== Municipalities ==
1. Aguanqueterique
2. Cabañas
3. Cane
4. Chinacla
5. Guajiquiro
6. La Paz
7. Lauterique
8. Marcala
9. Mercedes de Oriente
10. Opatoro
11. San Antonio del Norte
12. San José
13. San Juan
14. San Pedro de Tutule
15. Santa Ana
16. Santa Elena
17. Santa María
18. Santiago de Puringla
19. Yarula
