= Marcala =

Marcala "Land of Prisons" (Lenca)
- Municipality
- Location in Honduras
- Coordinates: 14°9′0″N 88°1′6″W
- Country: Honduras
- Department: La Paz

Area
  - Total: 218 km^{2} (84 sq mi)

Population (2023 projection)
  - Total: 34,965
  - Density: 160/km^{2} (415/sq mi)

Marcala is a town, with a population of 15,050 (2023 calculation), and a municipality in the Honduran department of La Paz. The region is known for its coffee production, boasting the first "protected origin denomination" for coffee. Marcala has been designated as a center of Lenca Trail, a government and United Nations sponsored development effort to encourage tourism to Lenca communities. It offers visitors perspective on the culture of indigenous people and provides new markets for their traditional crafts.

== Demographics ==
At the time of the 2013 Honduras census, Marcala municipality had a population of 28,614. Of these, 63.47% were Mestizo, 34.33% Indigenous (34.20% Lenca), 1.71% White, 0.44% Black or Afro-Honduran and 0.06% others.
