= Lamani =

Lamani may refer to:

- Lamani or Lambadi, an Indo-Aryan language spoken by 5 million people in India
- John Lamani (d. 2012), founder of the Solomon Star
- Mokhtar Lamani (b. 1952), Moroccan diplomat
- Nocwaka Lamani (1931–2021), South African politician
