= Guajiquiro =

- Municipality
- Location in Honduras
- Coordinates: 14°07′N 87°50′W
- Country: Honduras
- Department: La Paz

Area
  - Total: 275 km^{2} (106 sq mi)

Population (2015)
  - Total: 14,959
  - Density: 54.4/km^{2} (141/sq mi)

Guajiquiro is a municipality in the Honduran department of La Paz.

== Demographics ==
At the time of the 2013 Honduras census, Guajiquiro municipality had a population of 14,616. Of these, 83.68% were Indigenous (83.60% Lenca), 15.99% Mestizo, 0.16% White, 0.16% Black or Afro-Honduran and 0.01% others.
