= La Paz, Honduras =

La Paz
- Municipality
- Location in Honduras
- Coordinates: 14°19′6″N 87°40′6″W
- Country: Honduras
- Department: La Paz
- Founded: 1792

Area
  - Municipality: 162 km^{2} (63 sq mi)
- Elevation: 750 m (2,461 ft)

Population (2023 projection)
  - Municipality: 55,776
  - Density: 344/km^{2} (892/sq mi)
  - Urban: 34,504

La Paz (Spanish pronunciation: [la ˈpas]) is the capital city of the La Paz Department of Honduras. The town has a population of 32,450 (2023 est.).

La Paz is located 750m (2461 feet) above sea level on the Comayagua River near the Cordillera de Montecillos in an area that has mountainous terrain with thick jungle cover.

== History ==
The town dates back to 1750 when two Spanish colonies existed in the area. The town's title was given on 14 September 1848, when the name "La Paz" was officially recognized by a decree from Comayagua; in 1861, it was given the status of a city, and in 1869 it was made a departmental seat.

== Demographics ==
At the time of the 2013 Honduras census, La Paz municipality had a population of 43,980. Of these, 91.32% were Mestizo, 4.78% White, 2.42% Indigenous (2.19% Lenca), 1.32% Black or Afro-Honduran and 0.16% others.

== Economy ==
Major industries in and around the city include henequen and coffee farming, cattle raising, timber processing, tanning, distilling and some mining.

== Culture ==
The festival of the "Virgen de los Dolores" is held in November.

The local cultural center is located in a 19th-century house and has a collection of paintings and cultural objects that date to the 19th century period. It also organizes activities throughout the year.

== Sports ==
The local football team, Municipal Paceño, play their home games at the Estadio Roberto Suazo Cordoba. In summer 2013, they were relegated to the third tier of Honduran football.
