= Chilanga, El Salvador =

Chilanga
- District
- Location in El Salvador
- Coordinates: 13°43′N 88°7′W
- Country: El Salvador
- Department: Morazán Department
- Elevation: 922 ft (281 m)

Chilanga is a district in the Morazán department of El Salvador.
