= Afro-Hondurans =

Ethnic group

Black Hondurans
Afrohondureños
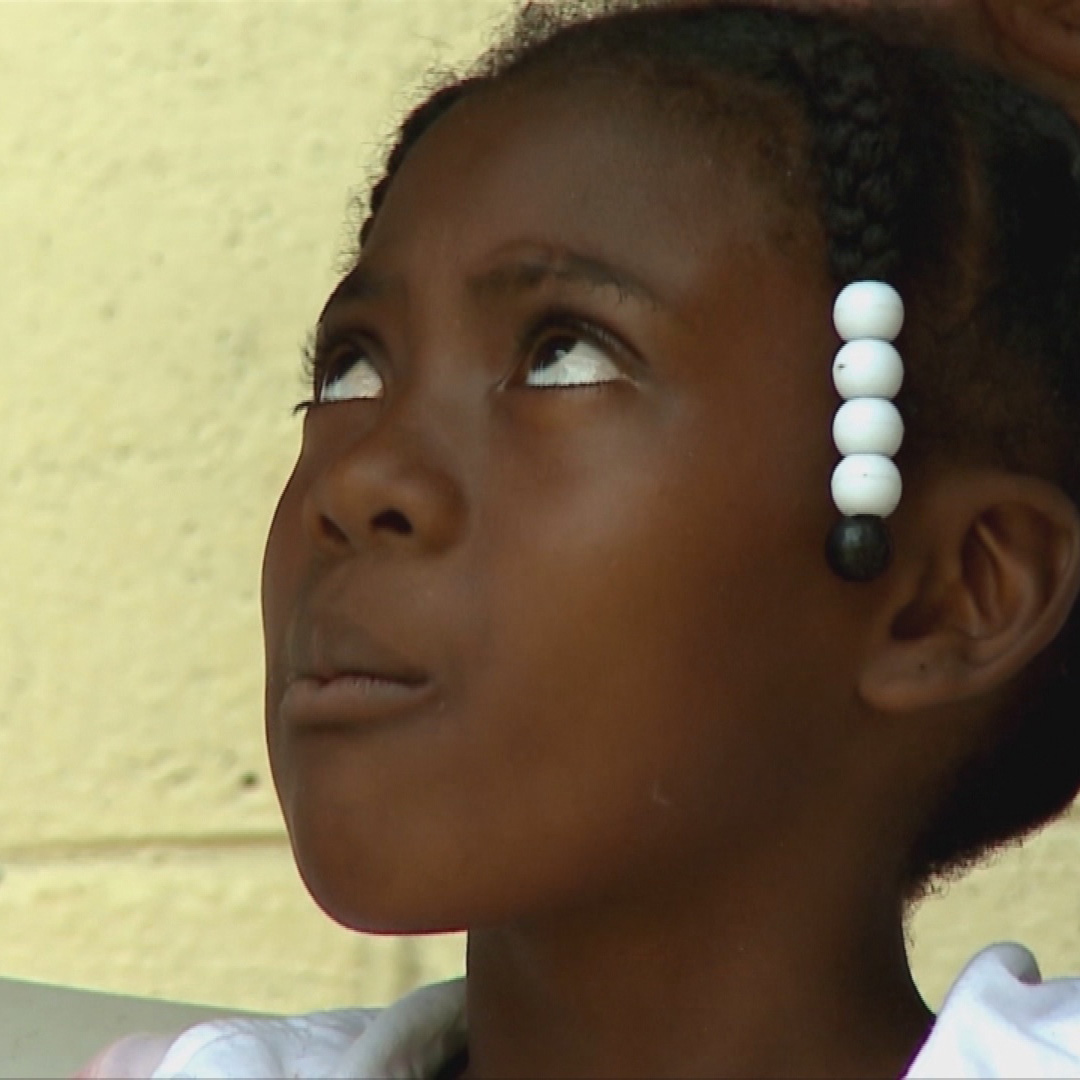
- Afro-Honduran girl from La Mosquita, Honduras.

Total population
- 1-2% of population (non-official estimates)

Regions with significant populations
- Creole people: Bay Islands and some Caribbean coastal Honduran cities like Puerto Cortes, Tela and La Ceiba; Garifuna people: Roatan Island, Trujillo, Colon, Santa Fe, Colon, La Ceiba, Tela African people: La Ceiba, Roatan, Trujillo, Gracias a Dios, El Progreso, Islas de la Bahia, La Paz, Olancho, Tegucigalpa, San Pedro Sula, and Tela

Languages
- Majority: Spanish; Minority: Garifuna, Miskito, and Bay Islands English

Religion
- Protestantism, Roman Catholicism,

Related ethnic groups
- Afro-Latin Americans, Caribs

Afro-Hondurans or Black Hondurans are Hondurans of Sub-Saharan African descent. Research by Henry Louis Gates and other sources regards their population to be around 1-2%. They descended from: enslaved Africans by the Spanish, as well as those who were enslaved from the West Indies and identify as Creole peoples, and the Garifuna who descend from exiled zambo Maroons from Saint Vincent. The Creole people were originally from Jamaica and other Caribbean islands, while the Garifuna people were originally from Saint Vincent and the Grenadines. Garifunas arrived in the late seventeen hundreds and the Creole peoples arrived during the 1800s. About 100,000-300,000 Hondurans are of Garífuna descent that are a mix of African and indigenous as of Afro Latin Americans. Honduras has one of the largest African communities in Central America.

== History ==
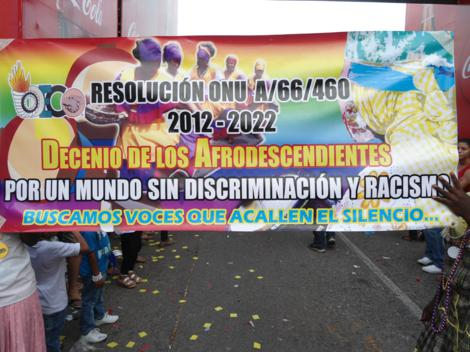
Banner at Carnival de La Ceiba

One of the first African slaves who arrived in Honduras, Juan Bardales, participated in the Spanish conquest of the province, especially in Trujillo. Shortly thereafter, Berdales was awarded his freedom. In Honduras, slaves played an important role in the mining industry. Many of them came from Africa, from places like Angola or Senegambia, while others came from the Caribbean. In 1542, 165 slaves came via Portugal and 150 from Santo Domingo. In Honduras, were imported slaves Mandinka kangkurao of the Gambia River in Senegambia.

By the mid-sixteenth century, between 1,000 and 1,500 enslaved blacks worked in the gold washings of Olancho; these slaves likely hailed from Africa. In Honduras, 300 Africans arrived in Olancho and at Rio Guayape in 1590; they were sent to both areas for mining woo. A crew of Angolans worked in the mines and businesses in San Miguel. Although many mulattoes and browns also worked in Tegucigalpa on the same dates. Between 1750 and 1779, a larger group of African slaves, Carabali and mondongos (a Kongo tribe) people, were taken to Honduras to build the military fort San Fernando de Omoa, the most important in the region.

In 1796, approximately 300 "French black" from the French colony of Saint Domingue came to Trujillo, in the context of the conflict that gave rise to the independence of Haiti. In 1797, the British exported between 2,000 and 4,000 Black Caribs - mixture of Carib Indians and African Blacks - to the island o Roatán in Honduras, because they rebelled against them on the island St. Vincent. After this, these Garifuna, as called themselves, migrated to Trujillo and from there, scattered along the coasts of all the Central American mainland until Costa Rica (without reaching this place), especially by the persecutions to which they were subjected by the Spanish authorities. Some of them were involved in the civil wars of the time.

In the late eighteenth century records tell of significant percentages of blacks and mulattoes in Tegucigalpa. But at the end of the colonial period, slaves were already mainly mulattoes. Between the late eighteenth and mid-nineteenth century, the British introduced black slaves from Jamaica, Cayman Island and Belize in Honduras.

According to Luis Pedro Taracena, in these years, Tegucigalpa was populated by 80% mulattoes and this percentage was increasing over time, at least until 1815 (when they were 86% of the population). During the twentieth century, mulattoes and browns were progressively neutralized under the category of "Ladino". According to historian Marbin Barahona, the racial mixture enters blacks with whites and Amerindians occurred since the 1520s, due to the decline of the indigenous population, the Spanish immigration scanty, and the meager arrival of African slaves. The recovery of the hegemony of silver and indigo, the prohibition of non-indigenous groups living in Indian villages, and the population growth recorded in the same century, miscegenation, primarily among Amerindian and Spanish, not only increased significantly at this time but concentrated in certain regions, especially in the current Francisco Morazán Department, and Choluteca and Comayagua departments.

These departments attracted many mixed-race people (mestizo, mulatto, pardo, Ladino, etc.), unlike the indigenous concentration departments West. In 1775, lived in San Fernando de Omoa between 300 and 400 Africans and about 75 white families. They remained there until the early nineteenth century. So, in the late eighteenth century, the Spanish-origin population would have been a minority compared to the racially mixed populations ("Ladino").

The Spanish Crown considered Ladinos as those subjects of the Crown, originally non-Hispanics, and they learned the official languages of the empire or Vulgar Latin. In the Americas, the Ladinos were often identified as those groups of nonwhites who were Amerindian or Spanish - speaking (and most people who were not white or Amerindians in the Americas at the time were mestizos and Afro-descendants), including possibilities such as "black ladino," "mulatto Ladin", etc. According to Barahona, Ladinos were the majority of the population in 1800 (60% of the population).

Because these days, most African - Hondurans were mulatto, sambo, and browns. Although the seventeenth century had five categories in the census of Spanish America, "white", "Indians", "mestizos", "black" and "mulatto", already in the eighteenth century, the last three categories alone in a bind: "Ladino". During the nineteenth and twentieth centuries, the Spanish authorities considered Honduran even entire regions populated mostly as mulatto, sambo, or brown. Such is the case of places like Olancho, Yoro, Colon and Atlántida, regions that eventually could have remixed with whites, Amerindians, and mestizos.

It was in the early nineteenth century when slavery was abolished in Honduras. After 1820, Afro-Hondurans were simply considered citizens and obtained the rights of any citizen to be excluded from the category of "free blacks". This was perhaps because the General Francisco Ferrera, Honduran politician who was part of the government of Honduras at the time, had ancestors who were mulattoes. Nonetheless, he decreed the expulsion of the country's Garifuna (but ultimately this is not carried out).

The Honduran historian Antonio Canelas Diaz says that by the year 1870, was organized in the city of La Ceiba - the point where, emerged on a large scale banana production in Honduras - a company called "New Orleans and Bay Island Company" whose executives, imported the first black Creoles hired by fruit, since they were labor" [...] more qualified than the Honduran "in banana cultivation, and who had previously worked in their respective nations that sector. Other black anglophone contingents arrived in Honduras with the arrival of black workers from Jamaica and other English-speaking islands arrived to work for the banana transnationals.

In 1931, the intellectual, Alfonso Guillen Zelaya Honduran, raised the huge black presence on the north coast and the fear that it increased what he called the "black import" Honduras ended up being a country of mulatto people, however, as the country was mostly mestizo and the indigenous population had been growing over the years.

== Demography ==
=== Background ===
The African Cultural legacy is evident in some places of Honduras. Trujillo held certain dance parties, whose dancers carry specific masks. Both the dance and the masks are of Mandinka kangkurao origin. In addition to the Afro-Hondurans that descended from slaves imported by the Spanish, there are other Afro communities in Honduras, also present in Nicaragua y Guatemala: Miskito, Creoles, and Garifuna.

=== Ethnic groups ===
==== Miskito Sambus ====
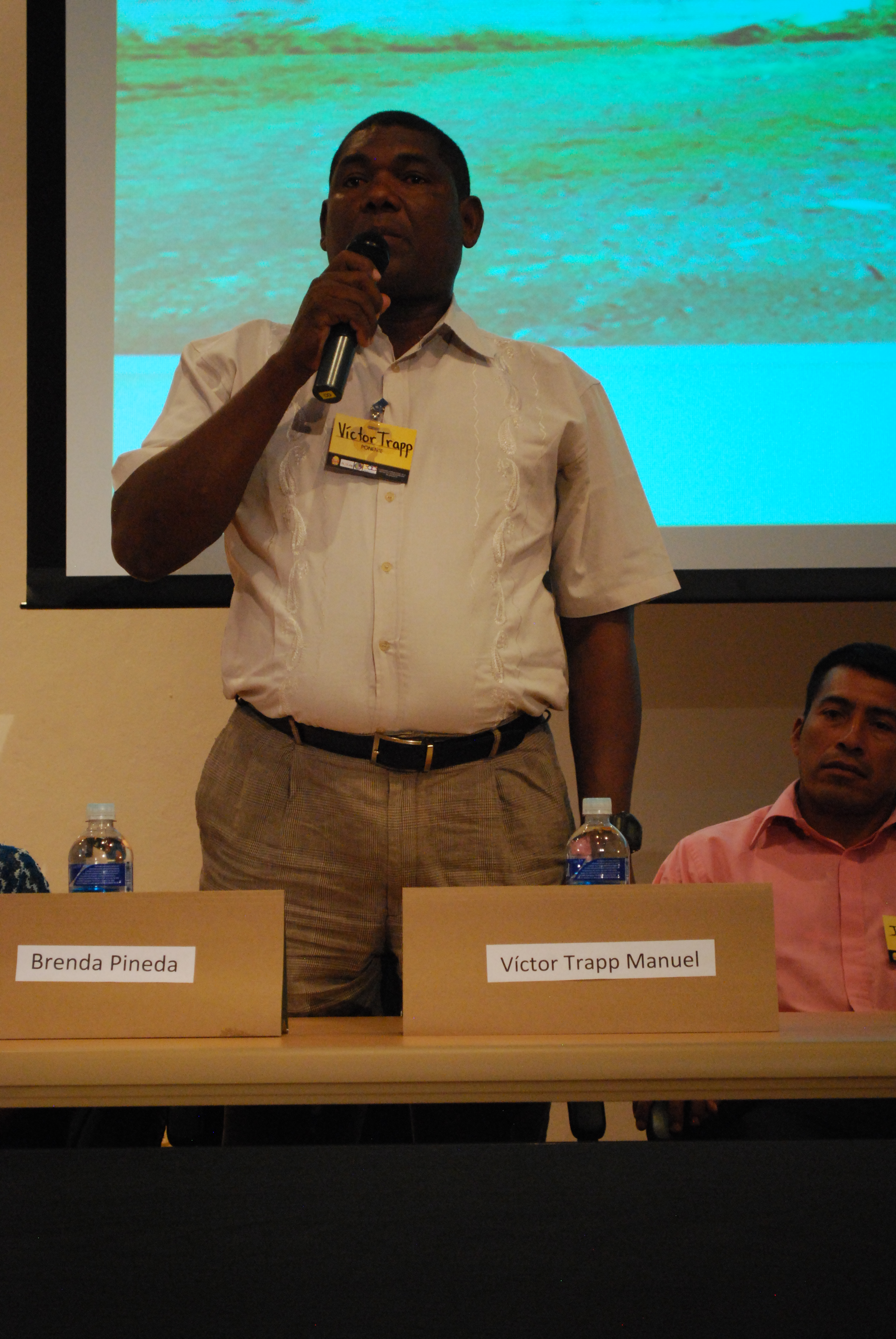
Victor Trapp Manuel (a Miskito Sambu) representing the Miskito people at a forum of the ACAL conference at the Universidad Nacional Autonoma de Honduras

The Miskito are an indigenous ethnic group in Central America, of whom many are mixed race. In the northern end of their territory, the people are primarily of African-Native American ancestry; others are of mixed African-Native American and English descent. Their territory extends from Cape Camarón, Honduras, to Río Grande de Matagalpa, Nicaragua, along the Mosquito Coast, in the Western Caribbean Zone. Their population is estimated at 180,000 people as of 2016.

The indigenous people speak a native Miskito language, but large groups also speak Miskito Coast Creole, Spanish, which is the language of education and government, and other languages. Miskito Coast Creole, an English-based Creole language, came about through frequent contact with the British for trading, as they predominated along this coast. Many are Christians. A 1987 peace agreement afforded them land rights over traditional lands. However, despite significant political struggles throughout their history, today the Miskito face human rights violations over land rights disputes, as recognized by the Inter-American Commission on Human Rights. Before the 1700s arrival of Europeans in the region, the area was divided into numerous small, egalitarian indigenous groups, possibly speaking languages related to the Sumo languages. The Spanish listed 30 "nations" in Taguzgalpa and Tologalpa, as the Spanish understood their geography. Karl Offen's analysis of this historic data suggests there were about a half-dozen entities, groups who were distinct by their language dialects, who were situated in the river basins. Miskito hut in Nicaragua The Spanish were unable to conquer this region during the sixteenth century. Much of the Caribbean coast of Nicaragua and northeastern Honduras was outside any Spanish authority. The region became a haven for northern Europeans, especially Dutch, English, and Welsh privateers during the early seventeenth century, for example, Henry Morgan, Daniel Montbars and William Dampier. A number of Africans reached the coast from shipwrecked slave ships, notably one in the mid-seventeenth century. The survivors of shipwrecks and escaped slaves from the Providence Island colony, settled around Cape Gracias a Dios. They intermarried with the indigenous people.

The Spanish referred to their mixed-race descendants as "Mosquito Zambo" (Mosquito was their transliteration of Miskito). Those Miskito living in the southern (Nicaraguan) region were less racially mixed. Modern scholars have classified them as Tawira Miskito. Rivalries between these two groups and competition for territory often led to wars, which were divisive in the eighteenth century. British-Miskito alliance.

English privateers working through the Providence Island Company made informal alliances with the Miskito. These English began to crown Miskito leaders as kings (or chiefs); their territory was called the Mosquito Kingdom (the English adopted the Spanish term for the indigenous people). A 1699 written account of the kingdom described it as spread out in various communities along the coast but not including all the territory. It probably did not include the settlements of English traders. The king did not have total power. The 1699 description noted that the kings and governors had no power except in wartime, even in matters of justice. Otherwise, the people were all equal. Their superior leaders were named by the English as the king, a governor, a general, and, by the 1750s, an admiral. Historical information on kings is often obscure as many of the kings were semi-mythical.

In the late seventeenth and early eighteenth centuries, the Miskito Zambo began a series of raids attacking Spanish-held territories and the still independent indigenous groups in the area. Miskito raiders reached as far north as the Yucatán, and as far south as Costa Rica. Many of their captives were sold into slavery to European slave traders, and many of them ended up working on Jamaican sugar plantations. In addition, from 1720 onwards, the Jamaican colonial authorities commissioned the Miskito to capture Maroons in the Blue Mountains, as they were effective trackers.

The Miskito king and the British concluded a formal Treaty of Friendship and Alliance in 1740. The British appointed John Hodgson as Superintendent of the Shore. The British established a protectorate over the Miskito Nation, often called the Mosquito Coast (related to the original Spanish name).

The Miskito kingdom aided Britain during the American War of Independence by attacking Spanish colonies to draw off their forces. It gained several victories alongside the British. But, at the conclusion of the peace in 1783, Britain had to cede control over the coast to Spain. The British withdrawal was completed at the end of June 1787. To compensate their Miskito supporters, the British re-settled 537 Miskitos, together with their 1,677 slaves, from Mosquitia to the Bay settlement in British Honduras, present-day Belize. Despite their official withdrawal, Britain maintained an unofficial protectorate over the kingdom. They often intervened to protect Miskito's interests against Spanish encroachments.

===== Miskito Zambo during Independence era =====
In addition to the area's geographic isolation, the Miskito military capacity and British support allowed the people to retain their independence when Spain controlled the Pacific side of Central America. The Miskito Coast remained independent throughout much of the period of the Federal Republic of Central America, but Nicaragua finally absorbed the territory in 1894.

Once the Central American republics became independent in the early to mid-nineteenth century, they had less power in relation to other nations than did Spain and struggled to protect their own territorial interests against filibusters and the United States government, which took an increasing strategic interest in the area.

Great Britain took an interest in the affairs on the Mosquito Coast, as it had trade positions in Belize/British Honduras and Jamaica. In addition, US trading interests began to develop in the region. British governors in Belize began issuing commissions and appointments to Miskito kings and other officials, such as King Robert Charles Frederick, crowned in Belize in 1825. British officials regularly officially recognized the various Miskito offices; it worked to protect Miskito's interests against the Central American republics and against the United States.

The latter contested British influence as per the Monroe Doctrine. The United States' involvement in the war with Mexico prevented it from enforcing the doctrine. As Britain gradually became less interested in its commissioning of Miskito nobility, the Miskito effectively began to operate as an independent state. Due to British economic interest in Central America (particularly British Honduras, now Belize), they regularly traded with the Miskito.

After Nicaragua declared independence in 1821, combined Miskito-Zambo raiders began to attack Honduran settlements. They sometimes rescued enslaved Miskito before they could be transported beyond their reach. They also enslaved women from other tribes for use as sexual partners.

Their society allowed polygamy. The Miskito population boomed as the men had more children with their slave women. These raids continued for many years after animosity between Britain and Spain ended at the international level. For a long time, the Miskito considered themselves superior to other indigenous tribes of the area, whom they referred to as "wild". The Miskito commonly adopted European dress and English names.

From the middle of the nineteenth century, British interest in the region began to wane. At the Treaty of Managua in 1860, Great Britain allowed Nicaragua to have an uncontested claim over the Mosquito Coast. The treaty provided for a Miskitu reserve, a self-governing entity that enjoyed semi-sovereign rights. Nicaraguan forces occupied the area in 1894 and took over the state. The British restored the Miskito Reserve in July, but Nicaraguan forces reoccupied in August 1894 and ended its independence.

Various major American fruit companies such as the United Fruit Company, which had begun large-scale production of bananas in the Miskito reserve, supported Nicaragua's takeover of power in the area. The American companies preferred Nicaraguan authority to the Miskito, especially as the Miskito elite was more prepared to protect the rights of small landholders than the Nicaraguan government.

==== Bay Island Creoles ====
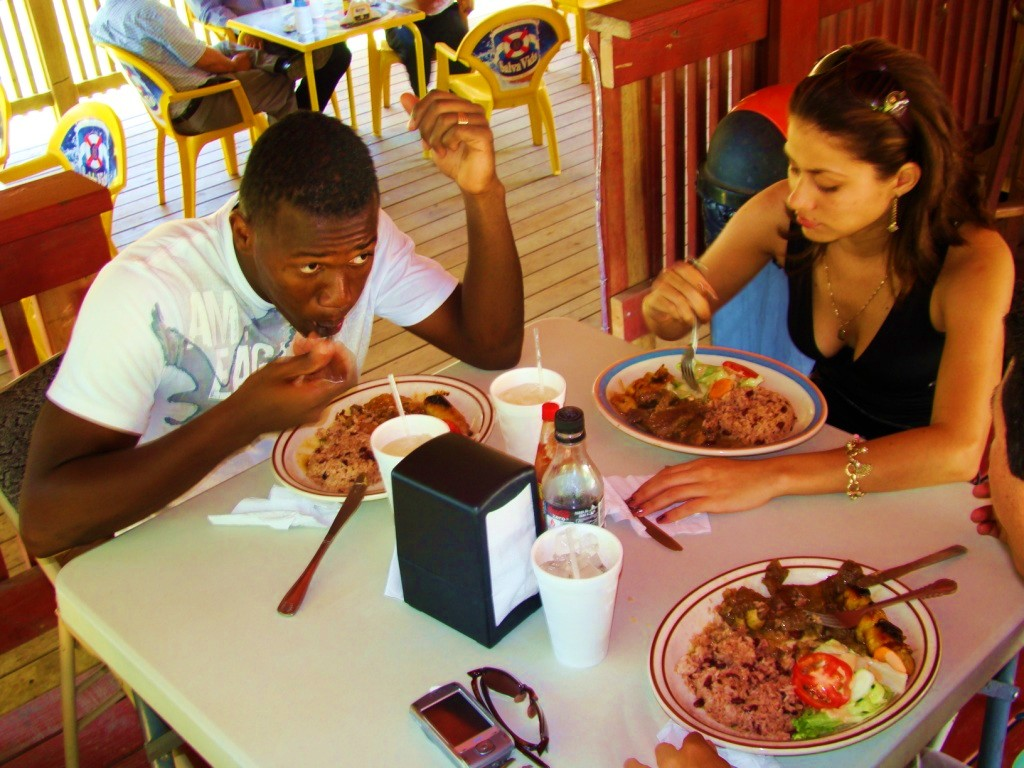
A Bay island Creole eating at the Saloon Rotan in Roatán, Honduras.

British blacks or Creoles arrived originally with the introduction of enslaved Africans to Jamaica, Cayman, and Belize by the British during the late eighteenth and mid-nineteenth century who later arrived in Honduras. Creoles also arrived with the immigration of black workers from Jamaica, Cayman Island, Trinidad and Tobago and other English-speaking islands, who arrived in the early twentieth century to work in transnational banana companies, workers in the construction of railways, dockworkers and in some cases "scabs", are concentrated mainly in the Bay Islands, especially the Roatan Island and Guanaja and some Caribbean coastal Honduran cities like Puerto Cortes, Tela and La Ceiba.

In the 2000s, some Creoles migrated to the major cities of Tegucigalpa, San Pedro Sula, and other urban centers in the interior. Like the Garifuna, many work as sailors and emigrated to the United States or Grand Cayman Island with which there are strong trade and cultural relations. Over time, blacks brought by the British were learning the customs and the English language, which managed to keep up today. Like white citizens, long blacks were not considered Hondurans. Although the Bay Islands were eventually recognized as Honduran territory by the British in 1861, by the Treaty "Wike-Cross", in 1904, people still continued to believe that these lands were English possessions.

Even in the 1930s, during the dictatorship of Gen. Tiburcio Carias (1933–1949), many islanders be Honduran nationals refused, and still clinging to their English traditions, practicing the Protestant religion and speaking only English. As shown, this process represents the first contingent of blacks settled in British Honduras, which was a result of the transfer of slaves from the British to the Bay Islands and some places on the Honduran coast between the late eighteenth and mid-century.

Over time, the black English originally came with the illusion of wealth and then return to their countries, they fell in Honduras and evidently were acquiring some Honduran customs, but in essence, they brought many manifestations of their lands, such as religion, music, traditions and language in many cases, are still preserved and that makes, therefore, constitute a distinct ethnic group from the rest of the Honduran population, however, naturally feel today Hondurans and, in fact, a major instances by which have been "integrating" the Honduran has been through sport. Indeed, many black British have been in recent decades some major national athletes, especially in football clubs and the national team of Honduras, but also have excelled in other sports such as athletics, baseball, and basketball. Finally, many black British, before the decline of the banana industry and the emergence of other productive sectors, were emigrating from the 1950s to the United States and enrolled in marine commercial fishing fleets throughout the Caribbean. Currently, it is estimated that the number of black English or Creole is around 32,000 people.

==== Garifunas ====
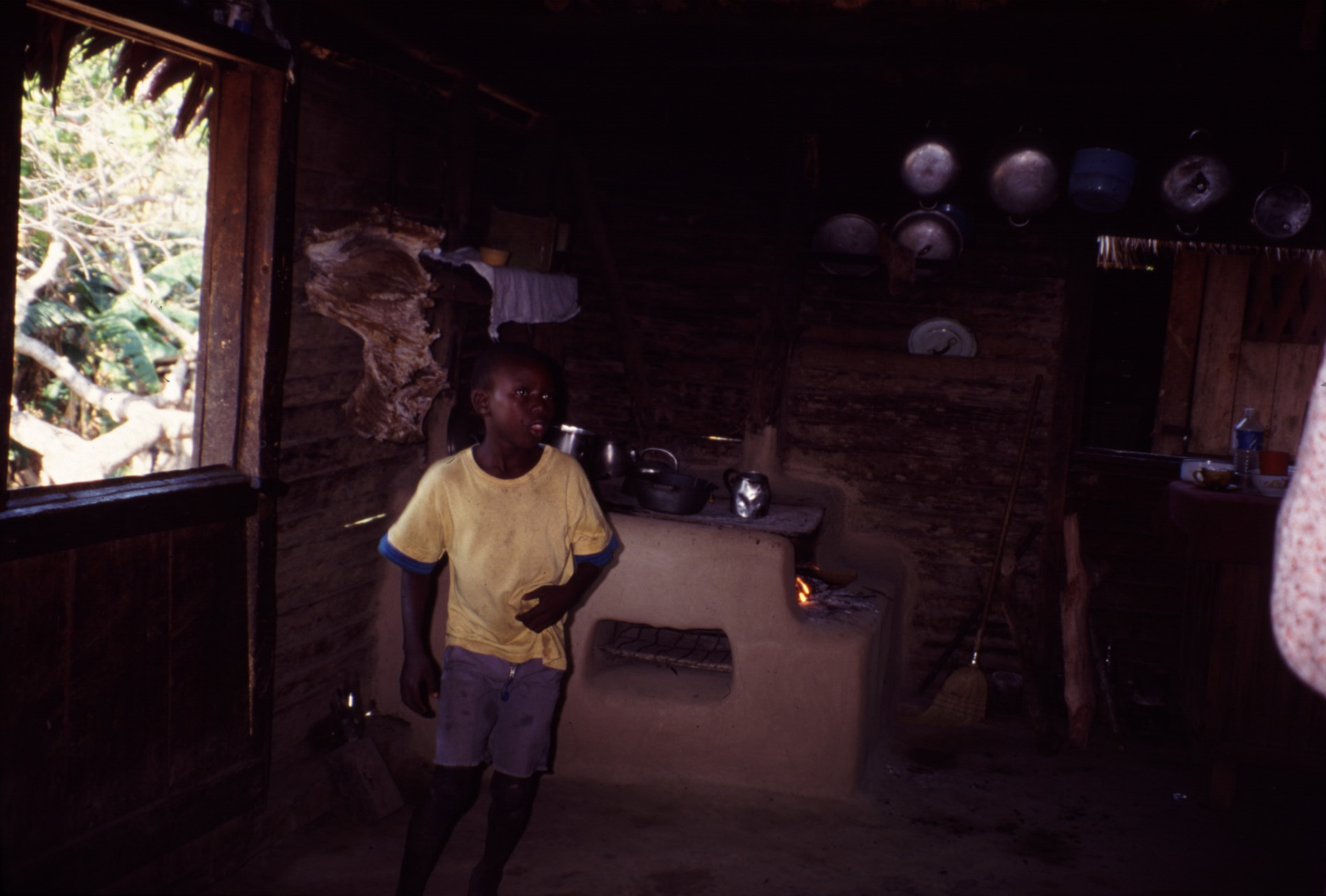
A Garifuna boy at his house in La Mosquitia, Honduras.

In 1797, the British exported between 2,000 and 4,000 Black Caribs - a mixture of Indigenous Caribs and Africans - to the island of Roatán in Honduras, because they rebelled against them on the island St. Vincent. While the British ships that carried to Black Caribes to the island addressed her, the Spanish captured one of the British ships, bringing it to Trujillo, Honduras where the Garifunas were released. In addition, the Spanish captured 1,700 Garifunas on the island of Roatan and they took them to Trujillo where they lacked manpower, the Garifuna people were regarded as skillful for crops, so they went to work and prospered enough in Trujillo, some of these were recruited by the Spanish army where they served with distinction.

Many Garifunas of Trujillo, especially due to the persecutions to which they were subjected by the Spanish authorities, emigrated and scattered were them along the coasts of all the Central American mainland until Costa Rica (without reaching this place), Later, because of great resentment against the Spanish, others many Garifuna fled to the coast of Belize where already lived other Garifunas. It is this migration that is celebrated annually on November 19 as Garifuna Settlement Day, and is the largest celebration of this community. Some of them were involved in the civil wars of the time.

During the twentieth century, some Garifuna worked on American and British boats during World War II and traveled around the world. As a result of these trips, there are now Garifuna small communities in Los Angeles, New Orleans, and New York City who send monthly remittances to Honduras worth $360,000.

The Garifuna culture is very strong, with great emphasis on music, dance, and history. They have their own religion, the Dugu, consisting of a mixture of Catholicism and African and Caribbean beliefs.

Today the Garifuna in Honduras struggling not to be deprived of their lands on the coast for tourism enterprises and try to keep their customs and culture at all costs. Garifuna music, Punta (tip), is a very rhythmic music, accompanied by a fast-paced sensual dance with a lot of hip movement. This music has been released recently by bands mostly Hondurans, including the most famous: Kazabe, Garifuna Kids, Banda Blanca, Silver Star, and Los Roland. Especially the song Sopa de Caracol, of Kazabe has popularized this music internationally. Is difficult to determine the exact number of English-speaking black Garifunas because, in the last decades, the ethnic category has not been considered in national population censuses. The Garifunas have formed 47 communities in the departments of Cortes, Atlantida, Bay Islands Colon and Gracias a Dios. April 12th marks the annual celebration of the arrival of the Garifuna community in Honduras.

===== Garifuna naming controversy =====
In March 2014, members of the Garifuna community made a formal complaint to the public prosecutor's office concerning the use of the term Afro when relating to members of the Garifuna community by the state of Honduras, claiming the term “afrohondureño” (Afro-Honduran in English) is incorrect because black people in Honduras were born there and are citizens of the country as much as members of other races. They claim such a term is being used to end the ethnic identity of the 46 communities which live along the Atlantic north coast.

===== Civil Rights =====
Racism against Afro-Hondurans has been a well-documented issue, even receiving international attention in several high-profile cases.

== Notable Afro-Hondurans ==
=== Film ===
- Alonzo Bodden, American comedian and actor, season 3 winner of Last Comic Standing
- Hype Williams, American film and music video director
- Maximiliano Hernández, American actor
- Skai Jackson, American actress, YouTuber, and author who was included in Time's list of Most Influential Teens in 2016
- Demi Singleton, American actress

=== Fashion ===
- Keylin Suzette Gómez, model and beauty pageant title holder

=== Military ===
- Juan Francisco Bulnes, lieutenant during the Central American civil war.

=== Music ===
- Evil E, disk jockey
- Sauce Walka, Honduran-American rapper and songwriter from Houston, Texas
- Sha EK, rapper
- Schoolboy Q, rapper

=== Herbalism ===
- Alfredo Bowman (Professionally known as Dr. Sebi), was a Honduran self-proclaimed herbalist and healer

=== Sports ===
- Gerald Young, baseball player
- Brian Flores, Honduran-American american football coach
- Edwin Solano, footballer
- Sherrie Arzú, footballer
- Elexa Bahr, footballer
- Douglas Martínez, footballer
- Alberth Elis, footballer
- Alex Güity, footballer
- Boniek Garcia, footballer
- Brayan Beckeles, footballer
- Bryan Róchez, footballer
- Carlos Pavón, footballer
- Danilo Turcios, footballer
- Darixon Vuelto, footballer
- David Suazo, footballer
- Deiby Flores, footballer
- Denilson Costa, footballer
- Dewan Hernandez, basketball player
- Domingo Drummond, footballer
- Edrick Menjívar, footballer
- Eduardo Bennett, footballer
- Elvin Oliva, footballer
- Elvis Scott, footballer
- Franklin Flores, footballer
- Franklin Webster, footballer
- Félix Crisanto, footballer
- Georgie Welcome, footballer
- Gerson Chávez, footballer
- Gilberto Yearwood, footballer
- Harold Calderon, boxer
- Jack Jean-Baptiste, footballer
- Jerry Bengtson, footballer
- Jerry Palacios, footballer
- Jimmy Bailey, footballer
- Jimmy Steward, footballer
- John Bodden, footballer
- Johnny Palacios, footballer
- Jorge Benguché, footballer
- Juan Carlos Obregón, footballer
- Marvin Brown, footballer
- Maylor Núñez, footballer
- Maynor Figueroa, footballer
- Milton Núñez, footballer
- Milton Palacios, footballer
- Mitchel Brown, footballer
- Osman Chávez, footballer
- Rigoberto Rivas, footballer
- Roberto Bailey, footballer
- Romell Quioto, footballer
- Ronnie Aguilar, footballer
- Rubilio Castillo, footballer
- Rudy Williams, footballer
- Shannon Welcome, footballer
- Teofimo Lopez, boxer
- Víctor Bernárdez, footballer
- Walter Martínez, footballer
- Walter Williams, footballer
- Wesly Decas, footballer
- Wilson Palacios, footballer
- Wisdom Quaye, footballer
- Anthony Lozano, footballer
- Hendry Thomas, footballer
- Richardson Smith, footballer
- Milson Palacios, footballer
- Luis López, footballer
- David Ruiz, footballer
- Kevin Álvarez, footballer
- Carlo Costly, footballer

== See also ==
- Demographics of Honduras
