= Margarita Murillo =

Honduran human rights activist

- Born: 1958
- Died: 27 August 2014 (aged 55–56); Villanueva, Cortés, Honduras
- Cause of death: Assassination
- Citizenship: Honduran
- Occupation: Human rights activist

Margarita Murillo (1958 - 27 August 2014) was a Honduran human rights activist. She was an advocate for the environment and an icon of the peasant defense for their lands.

== Biography ==
Murillo was the mother of Kenia Murillo, Franklin Octavio, Samuel David Flores and Margarita Montserrat.

Murillo was affiliated with the Union of Rural Workers (UNC). Her life was dedicated to the struggle for access to land for Honduran peasant women. In the Lenca tradition, female spirits reside in rivers and women are their main guardians, which is why Murilllo was one of the leaders of the movement against the granting of rivers to private companies and the construction of hydroelectric plants, due to their environmental impact and cultural in lands historically inhabited by indigenous people. She was one of the founders of the National Central of Farm Workers (CNTC) in the 1980s. During the 1980s, while she was active in the Lorenzo Zelaya insurrectionary movement, Murillo was kidnapped and tortured for political reasons by the Battalion 3-16 of Gustavo Álvarez Martínez when the National Security Doctrine was maintained. This event led her into exile. She also defended national sovereignty. Murillo was one of the founders and coordinator of the National Popular Resistance Front (FNRP) after the 2009 coup d'état. Murillo led the seizure of the central park of San Pedro Sula.

In 2013, Murillo was a candidate for Deputy of the National Congress, for Cortés, in the general election, representing Liberty and Refoundation coordinated by former President Manuel Zelaya.

== Death ==
In 2014, Murillo had returned to the field after running for election campaigns. She had suffered from diabetes. On 27 August, she was killed, shot in the forehead after defending herself, by a hit man while working the land on the North Coast of Honduras, in Planón, Villanueva, Cortés. Murillo was legalizing the ownership of her plot in El Venado.

The prosecutor in charge of the investigation of her death, Marlene Banegas, coordinator of the Office of the Prosecutor for Crimes against Life, and the prosecutor Patricia Eufrahio, were also murdered on 10 October, while investigating her murder. The suspects in both crimes were also murdered. David Edgardo Ordoñez, an alleged hit man, was killed by suffocation while in police custody. On 17 September, the Inter-American Commission on Human Rights (IACHR) urged the Honduran government to conduct a due diligence investigation into her murder, but to this day her case remains unpunished.

== See also ==
- Jeannette Kawas
- Berta Cáceres
- Lesbia Urquía
