= Murder of Vicky Hernández =

Murder in Honduras

Vicky Hernández
- Born: 1983
- Died: 28 June 2009 (aged 25–26); San Pedro Sula, Honduras
- Cause of death: Assassination
- Occupation: LGBT rights activist

The murder of Vicky Hernández was a hate crime that took place in Honduras. Hernández was a transgender woman who gained fame domestically as an LGBT activist.

In 2022, Honduran president Xiomara Castro apologized for the act, it being the first time in Honduras' history that the government apologized for a violent act against a member of the LGBT community.

== Victim ==
Vicky Hernández was a Honduran transgender woman who was assigned male at birth. She was a prostitute who later became an activist, fighting for the rights of LGBT people in her country. She has been described by newspapers such as The New York Times as a "passionate activist, who was a beloved sister and daughter". Hernández was diagnosed as having HIV before she retired from prostitution.

== Crime ==
Hernández was murdered during the 2009 Honduran coup d'état. On 28 June 2009, as the crisis took over the country, Hernández was shot in the head, dying from her wounds.

The crime took place in San Pedro Sula, a city that has had a problem with crime for decades.

== Afterwards ==
The state of Honduras investigated Hernández's death. One year after Hernández's murder, two other transgender women who had witnessed her killing and testified that they had seen members of the police on a patrol car approach Hernández the day of her death, were themselves murdered.

The Robert F. Kennedy Human Rights organization and the Red Lesbica Cattrachas, a lesbian feminist organization in Honduras founded by Indyra Mendoza, represented Hernández's family on the Inter-American Court of Human Rights (ICHR), arguing that Hernández's murder was an extrajudicial murder and that the case was negligently investigated by the country's government. The ICHR also found evidence that agents acting for the government were involved in the crime.

On 9 May, 2022, Honduran president Xiomara Castro apologized to Hernández's family and recognized the government's responsibility for the murder.

== In media ==
A documentary about Hernández and her murder, titled 28 de Junio: Vicky vs Honduras (transl. June 28: Vicky vs Honduras), was released in May 2022.

== See also ==
- Femicides in Honduras
- Ana Mirian Romero
- Máxima Acuña, Peruvian water activist
- Jeannette Kawas, slain Honduran environmentalist
- Berta Cáceres
