= María Jacinta Xón Riquiac =

Maya Kʼicheʼ anthropologist

María Jacinta Xón Riquiak
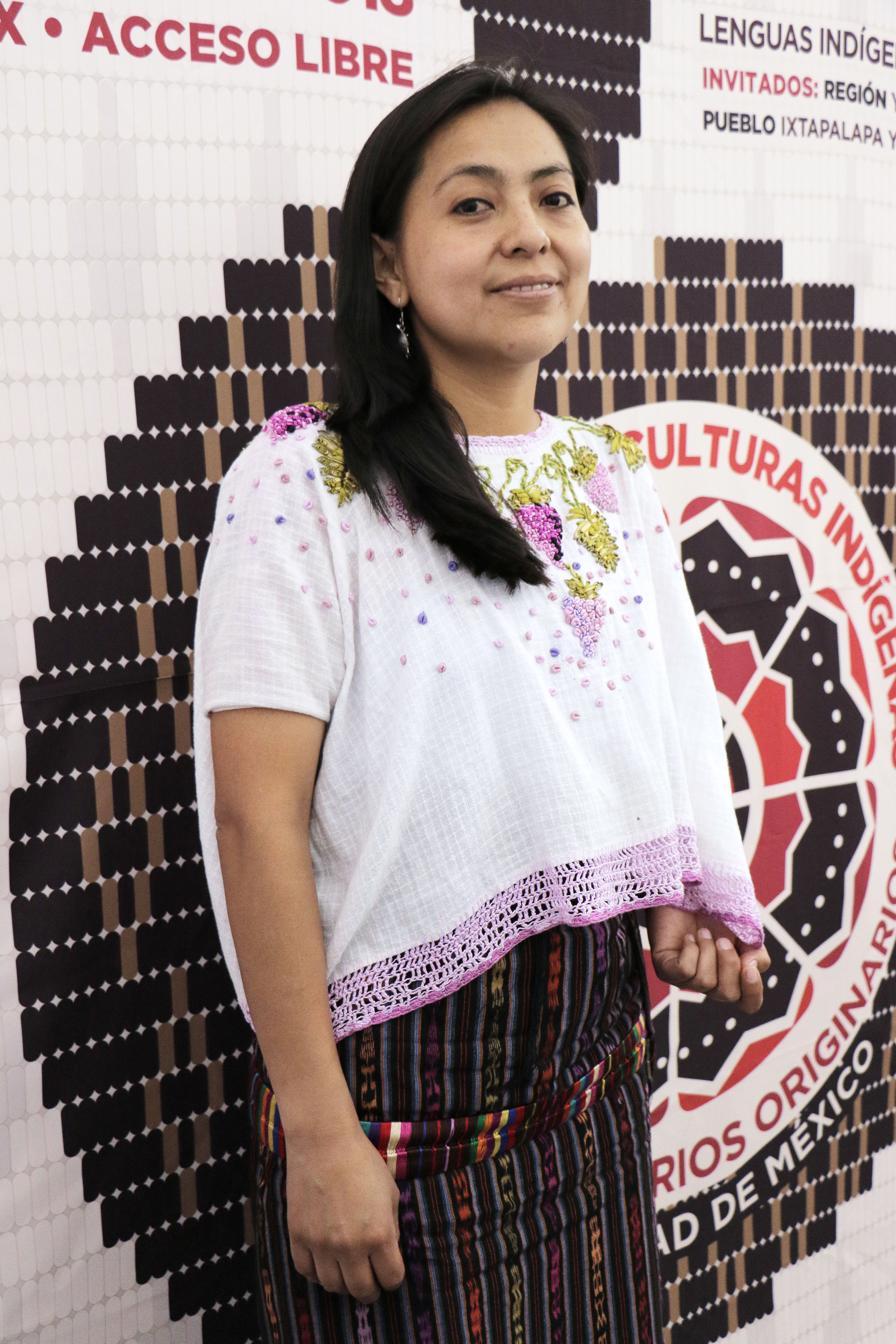
- María Jacinta Xón at the Festival of Indigenous Cultures, Peoples and Original Neighborhoods in 2018.
- Born: Chichicastenango, Guatemala
- Other name: María Jacinta Xón

María Jacinta X. Riquiac is a Maya Kʼicheʼ anthropologist and indigenous rights activist from Guatemala.

== Biography ==
Xón Riquiac studied anthropology at the University of San Carlos of Guatemala and with the support of the Ford Foundation received a master's degree in the history of science from the Pontifical Catholic University of São Paulo.

She has served as a representative of Guatemala's indigenous peoples at some international events. Xon Riquiac was featured as one of fifty Guatemalan women "writing history" profiled in the book Entre Chapinas (2020).

== Activism and research ==
Described as a "Mayan feminist," Xón Riquiac researches contemporary Guatemalan culture from an intersectional, anti-capitalist, feminist point of view.

Her 2004 thesis was titled "The Maya as a Political Identity in Indigenous Women," and this has remained a key research interest. Xón Riquiac has stressed the importance of clothing to Mayan communities, particularly how traditional designs are both preserved and modernized; she posits that these garments provide a stable sense of identity, especially for women. Xón Riquiac wears huipil and corte (a traditional skirt). Her interest in contemporary textiles has also led her to become an art critic for contemporary art related to indigenous textiles and weaving, such as the work of Tz’utujil artist Antonio Pichillá. She has also participated in art exhibitions.

Xón Riquiac has written about the damage of "othering" and stereotyping in contemporary Guatemalan culture that persist despite the promises of respect for indigenous persons established in the Peace Accords of 1996; she argues that indigenous women suffer the most because they have limited educational and economic opportunities.

Another of her research interests is the complex relationship between the state, dominant cultural groups and norms, and indigenous culture and beliefs. Reporting on a 2014 conflict in which a Tz’utijil/K’iche’ community wanted to remove a Haredi Jewish community from San Juan la Laguna, Xón Riquiac argues that government actions and accusations of racism, antisemitism, and religious intolerance, failed to take into account the specific circumstances of this conflict, perpetuated racist, anti-indigenous stereotypes, and privileged the rights of the Haredi community over those of the indigenous community. Her historical report on the Lenca was submitted as evidence in the trial about the construction of the Agua Zarca dam, in which she also served as an expert witness.

Xón Riquiac challenges perceived notions of empiricism in anthropology, which traditionally situated outsiders as more knowledgeable and scientific observers than members of the culture under observation. She also studies the academic field of indigenous studies itself.

== Tourism ==
Xón Riquiac has established "El Proyecto Tux Cocina Gourmet de Origen," an ethical tourism program, academic research project, and restaurant that promotes pre-Hispanic, pre-industrial Mayan food. In a 2020 interview, she said, "Our goal is to strengthen indigenous epistemology through [recognizing] the science of indigenous women [in food preparation] and both their oppression and resistance in domestic spaces."
