= Lesbia Urquía =

- Born: Lesbia Yaneth Urquía; 1967; La Esperanza, Honduras
- Died: 6 July 2016 (aged 48–49); Marcala, Honduras
- Cause of death: Assassination
- Occupations: Environmentalist, indigenous rights activist

Lesbia Yaneth Urquía (1967 - 6 July 2016) was a Honduran human rights activist. She was an advocate for the environment.

== Biography ==
Lesbia Urquía was a community leader of the Council of Popular and Indigenous Organizations of Honduras (COPINH), the same organization which Berta Cáceres belonged to. Urquía was opposed to the privatizations of the rivers, because they are diverted and stop giving water to the indigenous communities. In addition, dams promote the deforestation of these areas by companies and affect the flora and fauna of these lands. She had fought the construction of a hydroelectric dam of international investors in La Paz. The Lencas considered that the dams would affect their access to water, food and medical supplies, so that their traditional way of life would be jeopardized. The construction of this dam caused the Gualcarque River to stop supplying them with water.

On 6 July 2016, authorities found Urquía's body in the city of Marcala, near the landfill Mata Mula. She had been killed by two hit men with a machete to her head. The Council held the government responsible for her death, specifically the president of the National Party and her husband.

Urquía had three children and was 49 years of age at the time of her death.
