= Anolis caceresae =

Scientific classification
- Kingdom: Animalia
- Phylum: Chordata
- Class: Reptilia
- Order: Squamata
- Suborder: Iguania
- Family: Anolidae
- Genus: Anolis
- Species: A. caceresae

Binomial name
- Anolis caceresae (Hofmann & Townsend, 2018)

Species of lizard

Anolis caceresae, Berta's anole, is a species of lizard in the family Dactyloidae. The species is found in Honduras. It was named to recognize the indigenous environmental activist Berta Cáceres, who was assassinated in March 2016 over her protests against a proposed Agua Zarca dam on the Gualcarque River.
