= MILPAH =

Indigenous rights group in Honduras

MILPAH (Movimiento Independiente Indígena Lenca de La Paz Honduras) is an Indigenous rights group, based in the La Paz region of Honduras.

The group was formed in 2010 when Honduran Indigenous communities organised in response to the effect of mining companies and hydroelectric projects on territories of the Lenca people. The presence of the companies was by the group claimed to have a negative impact on natural resources such as mountains, forests and rivers.

The group has claimed that they were not sufficiently consulted in accordance with ILO Convention 169, with reference to Article 15 which states that Indigenous peoples have the right to participate in the use, management and conservation of resources, and that Indigenous peoples should be consulted in cases where such resources are the subject of exploration and exploitation.

MILPAH has been the subject of human rights campaigns from Amnesty International. The organisation has raised criticism towards the corporate interests on Lenca land, and regarding threats and assaults that MILPAH-members have been exposed to.
