= Indyra Mendoza =

Honduran LGBTQ+ activist (born 1968)

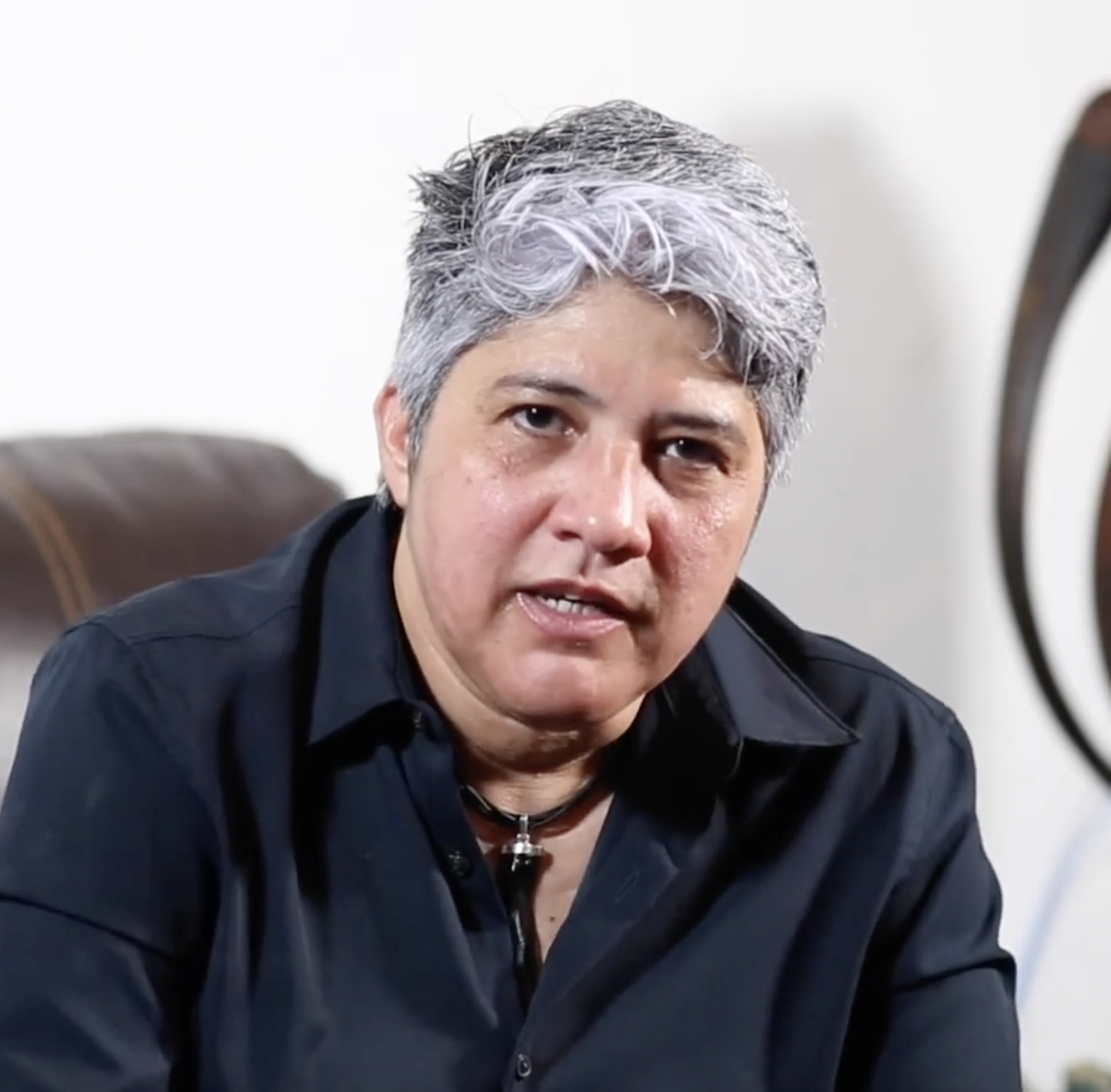
- Mendoza in 2021
- Born: 4 May 1968 (age 58); Tegucigalpa, Honduras
- Education: Universidad Nacional Autónoma de Honduras
- Occupations: LGBTQ+ activist, human rights defender, economist and numismatist
- Organization: Cattrachas Lesbian Network

Indyra Mendoza Aguilar (born 4 May 1968) is a Honduran LGBTQ+ activist, human rights defender, economist and numismatist. She is coordinator of the Cattrachas Lesbian Network. In 2021, Time magazine named Mendoza among the 100 most influential people in the world.

== Biography ==
Mendoza was born on 4 May 1968 in Tegucigalpa, Honduras. She studied economics at the Universidad Nacional Autónoma de Honduras (UNAH).

Mendoza came out as a lesbian aged 28, with her newly-found identity clashing with her former Roman Catholic ideals. Mendoza has since written children's books and short stories about lesbian life.

Mendoza is coordinator of the Cattrachas Lesbian Network (originally named the Red de Respuesta Lésbica CATTRACHAS), the first lesbian feminist organization in Honduras, founded in 2000. The network is a nongovernmental organization that carries out investigations for legal cases in defence of members of the LGBTQ+ community and tracks anti-LGBTQ+ crimes.

In 2012, Mendoza and the Cattrachas Lesbian Network with the Robert F. Kennedy Human Rights organization sued Honduras before the Inter-American Court of Human Rights (ICHR) in Costa Rica over the murder of Vicky Hernández, a transgender woman and activist, during the 2009 Honduran coup d'état. In June 2021, the Inter-American Court ruled in favour of the plaintiffs, declared Honduras responsible for Hernández's death and issued protection measures for transgender people in Latin America. In 2022, Honduran president Xiomara Castro publicly apologized.

In 2020, 16 LGBTQ+ people from Honduras applied for asylum in the United States, citing a threat to their lives because of their sexual orientation. Mendoza compiled reports and accompanied them to their legal hearings.

In December 2021, the Cattrachas Lesbian Network was awarded the European Human Rights Award by the European Union and its Member States. In 2021, Time magazine named Mendoza among the 100 most influential people in the world.

Alongside activism, Mendoza is also an economist and numismatist. She is the author of the Honduran coin collecting guides La vuelta al mundo en 80 monedas (2007) and El delito de falsificación de moneda en Honduras, 1880-2017 (2017).

== See also ==
- Femicides in Honduras
