= Bertha Zúñiga =

Honduran social activist (born 1990)

Bertha Zuniga Cáceres
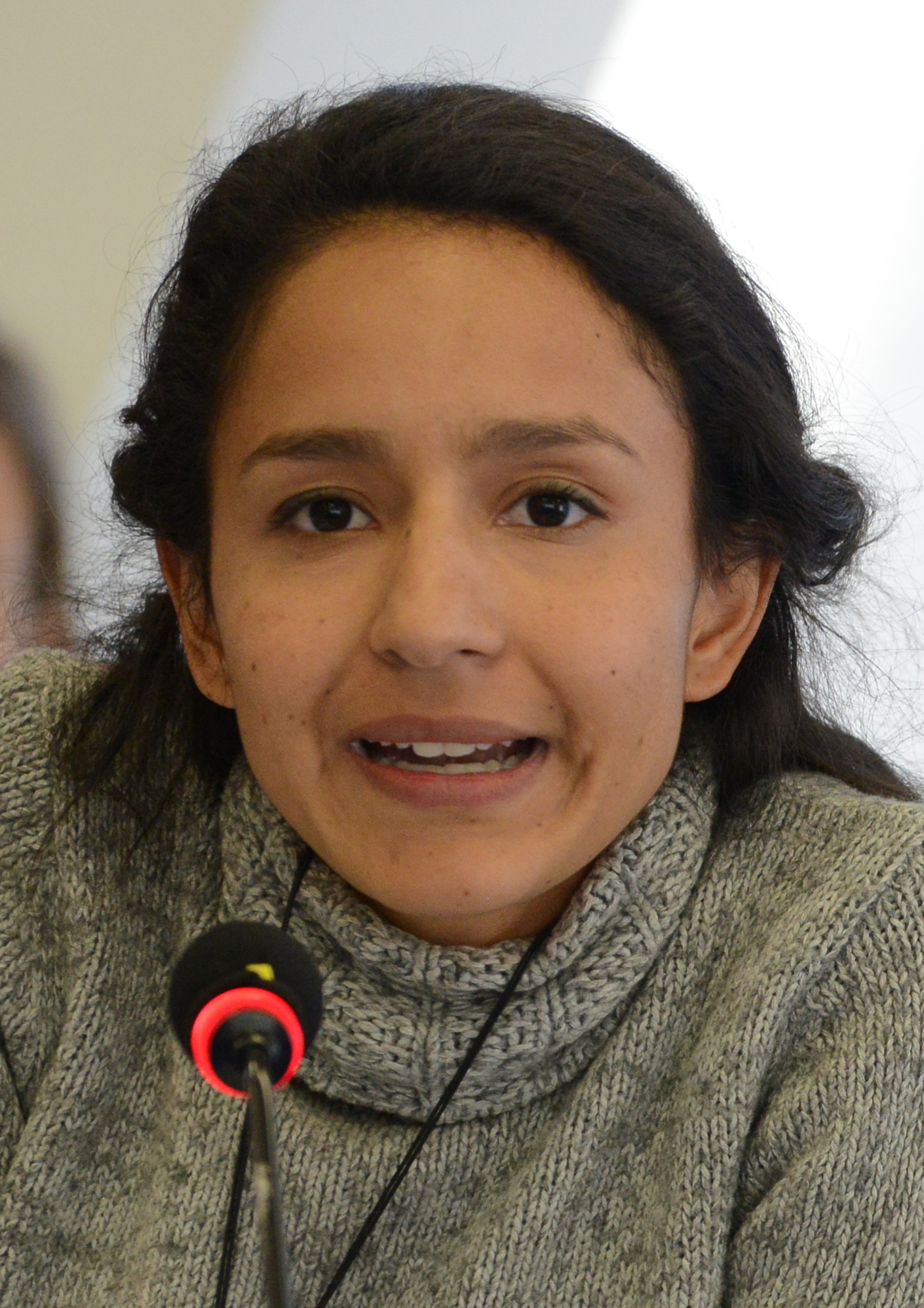
- Bertha Zuniga Cáceres, in 2016
- Born: 24 December 1990 (age 35); Puerto Cortés, Honduras
- Occupations: Environmentalist, indigenous rights activists
- Years active: 1990s -
- Known for: work to defend Lenca habitat and rights

Bertha Zuniga Cáceres (born 24 September 1990) is a Honduran social activist of Lenca descent. She is the daughter of social leader Berta Cáceres, murdered in 2016. Soon after assuming her mother's role of general coordinator of the Civic Council of Popular and Indigenous Organizations of Honduras (COPINH) in May 2017, Zúñiga Cáceres survived an attempt on her own life.

== Early life ==
Zuniga Cáceres was born in 1990, the daughter of Berta Cáceres and Salvador Zúñiga. She is second of four children, with two sisters and a brother. Her parents separated before she was ten. She was raised by her mother in the home of her grandmother, Austra Berta Flores, a civil servant who served as mayor of La Esperanza, governor of Intibucá, and deputy in the National Congress, unusual roles for women in the area at that time.

When Zuniga Cáceres was three, her mother founded COPINH, with her father as one of the original members. The organization is dedicated to the defense of the rights of the Lenca people and the defense of the environment, two of her mother's great passions, along with combatting sexual discrimination and the oppression of women and LGBT communities, all issues Berta Cáceres saw as interconnected. COPINH from the start had many detractors, which contributed to a turbulent early life for Zuniga Cáceres, whose family experienced death threats, physical assaults, and the imprisonment of Zuniga. Zuniga Cáceres grew up joining in the activities of COPINH with her family. Like her siblings, after a brief period in regular schools, she attended popular education schools, where she received anti-capitalist and anti-patriarchal training. She graduated from college in Cuba before beginning to work towards a master's degree in Latin American Studies in Mexico City.

== Murder of her mother ==
After the 2009 Honduran coup d'état, repression against COPINH and other social organizations escalated. Zuniga Cáceres' mother, one of the main indigenous leaders, was persecuted and threatened in particular for her struggle against the environmental and social consequences of the Agua Zarca hydroelectric project. At 23:40 on March 2, 2016, Berta Cáceres was murdered by two armed invaders to her home. Initially, the Honduran government pursued the matter as a crime of passion or as internal political struggles within COPINH, denying a connection to Berta Cáceres's political activism. Zuniga Cáceres demanded both national and international investigations into the crime and also began campaigning to support a bill in the United States for that country to suspend military support to Honduras until the latter state can demonstrate that it has taken action against the murders of human rights activists. By March 2018, nine men, including retired and active Honduran military and two of the developers of the Agua Zarca project, had been accused of complicity in the crime, with one declaring that the murder had been a paid assassination. In February 2018, Zuniga Cáceres expressed her belief that the government involved in the investigation are focusing on lower level conspirators to avoid acknowledging possible involvement of higher placed officials. Allegations have been made by former Honduran military that Berta Cáceres's name was included in a military hit list. In Honduras, since the 2009 coup, at least 124 activists for environmental and land protection have been killed.

== General Coordinator of COPINH ==
After Berta Cáceres's murder, Zuniga Cáceres left her studies in Mexico City to take up the leadership of COPINH, and in May 2017 she was elected general coordinator of that body, the same position her mother had occupied. From this position, she has continued her social and environmental struggle, especially against the installation of megaprojects that COPINH assert threaten economic, social, cultural and environmental rights of the Lenca people. A few weeks after assuming the leadership, Zuniga Cáceres survived an attack perpetrated against her and other members of that organization by armed attackers who came upon the vehicle holding the group with rocks and machetes and attempted to force them off the road over a cliff.
