= Femicide in Honduras =

Aspect of domestic violence

Femicide in Honduras is a concept referring to murders committed against women (i.e., femicide) in Honduras since 1990. According to the Penal Code in force until 2018, the crime of femicide is defined as a man or men killing a woman for reasons of gender, with hatred and contempt for her condition as a woman. Between 2002 and 2013, 3,923 women were murdered in Honduras. The number of femicides makes up 9.6% of the total number of homicides in the country. In 2013, 53 women were killed every month, and more than 90% of those cases (like murders generally in Honduras) went unpunished. More recent data reports that the level of impunity for femicides continues to be high, as it reached 95% for the 338 cases that occurred during 2017 through early 2018.

In 2015, the Honduran government allocated 30 million Honduran lempiras to the creation of a special unit in the 2016 budget for femicide investigation. Efforts to further combat the high rate of femicide in Honduras were seen in 2018 with the creation of the Inter-Agency Commission to Monitor Investigations into Violent Deaths of Women and Femicide, which was created following the country’s establishment of the Ministry of Human Rights in 2017. In 1997 and 2000, the Honduran government passed two laws attempting to put up safeguards to prevent violence and discrimination against women with the Law Against Domestic Violence and the Law (1997) on Equal Opportunities for Women (2000), however, there wasn't a law specific to Femicide as a crime until 2013.

== National Civil Code reforms ==
In February 2013, the National Congress of Honduras approved a reform in the national civil code which classified femicide as a serious felony, permitting sentences of up to 40 years in prison when under the following circumstances:

1. When the perpetrator of the crime maintains or has maintained a partner relationship, either matrimonial, domestic partnership, cohabitation, or any other relation in between, including those in which an emotional relationship is or has been sustained;
2. When the crime is preceded by acts of domestic violence, whether or not previously reported;
3. When the crime is preceded by sexual violence, assault, harassment, or persecution of any nature;
4. When the crime is committed with unjustifiable malice or cruelty, or if the wounds inflicted are shameful, degrading, or mutilating before or after the taking of life.

In 2017, during the discussion of the new Civil Codes, there was a proposal to maintain the crime of femicide but reduce the punishment to 20 to 30 years in prison.

== Noted cases ==
Notable femicide victims in Honduras include:

- Riccy Mabel Martínez Sevilla
- Blanca Jeannette Kawas
- María José Alvarado
- Berta Cáceres
- Vicky Hernández

== See also ==
- Crime in Honduras
- Gender inequality in Honduras
- Female Homicides In Juárez City
