= Lordship of Sulaco-Manianí =

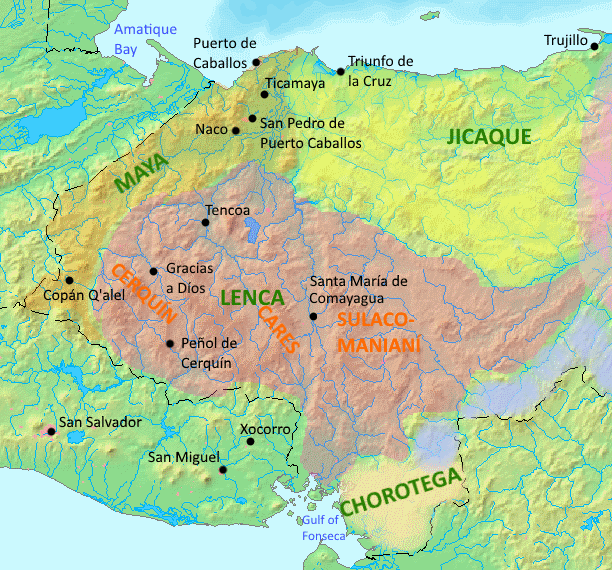
Location of the political entity.

The Lordship of Sulaco-Manianí, also referred to in some modern interpretations as the Sulaco-Manianí Confederation, was an Indigenous political entity located in what is now central Honduras. It appears in early colonial documentation as a province or territorial unit associated with two principal settlements: Sulaco and Manianí. Ethnohistorical studies, especially those by Honduran anthropologist Gloria Lara Pinto, suggest that Sulaco-Manianí formed part of the broader Indigenous political landscape of central Honduras during the late postclassic period and the early decades of Spanish conquest. Lara Pinto emphasizes that Spanish colonial documents often preserved valuable, though fragmentary, information about Indigenous political organization, migrations, trade networks, languages, religious practices, and territorial divisions at the moment of contact.

Sulaco-Manianí should be understood as a Lenca-affiliated Indigenous province, rather than as a state in the European sense. The term “province,” as used by Spanish conquerors, did not necessarily describe a centralized kingdom, but rather a native territorial unit composed of principal towns, dependent settlements, and spheres of political influence. Lara Pinto notes that the existence of a “Province of Sulaco-Manianí” did not exclude the presence of two separate settlements bearing those names; rather, it points to a geopolitical unit identified by the Spanish through its most prominent population centers.

== Toponymy and Etymology ==
The name Sulaco-Manianí is a compound designation derived from the two principal towns by which the Spaniards identified the province: Sulaco and Manianí. In colonial terminology, these towns may be interpreted as cabeceras, or head towns, around which smaller dependent settlements were organized. Spanish sources commonly distinguished between cabeceras and sujetos, meaning principal towns and subordinate communities respectively.

=== Sulaco ===
The most commonly repeated etymology for Sulaco interprets it as a Nahuatl-derived place name, traditionally translated as “in the land of the quails”. This interpretation appears in Honduran municipal and geographic traditions. However, as with many Indigenous place names recorded by Spanish scribes, the form of the word may have passed through phonetic adaptation, Spanish orthographic conventions, and later local reinterpretation. For that reason, the etymology should be presented as a traditional interpretation rather than as a fully proven linguistic reconstruction.

=== Manianí ===
The etymology of Manianí is more difficult to establish. The name is associated with the later settlement known as Lamaní, in the department of Comayagua. Honduran municipal sources state that Lamaní was known historically as Manianí and that the name is traditionally interpreted as meaning “place of potters” or “place of ceramic makers.” The Honduran National Institute of Statistics, drawing on Carmen Fiallos’s Historia de los municipios de Honduras, notes that Lamaní already appeared as a town under the name Manianí in 1684 and gives the meaning “Lugar de Alfareros.”

Because the name changed over time — Manianí / Aramaní / Lamaní — it is more cautious to say that Manianí was an Indigenous toponym associated with the later Lamaní area, whose traditional meaning is interpreted as “place of potters.”

== Geography ==
The province of Sulaco-Manianí was located in central Honduras, especially in relation to the Sulaco Valley and the northeastern portion of the Comayagua Valley, known historically as the Plain or Valley of Manianí. Lara Pinto identifies several major valleys in central Honduras as important for understanding Indigenous political geography, including Comayagua, Sulaco, Yoro, and Talanga. She specifically states that Sulaco was located in the Sulaco Valley, while Manianí occupied the portion of the Comayagua Valley known as the Plain of Manianí.

This geography is important because central Honduran valleys appear to have shaped political organization. Lara Pinto argues that the size and arrangement of these valleys likely played a determining role in the formation of political-territorial divisions. In this sense, Sulaco-Manianí was not merely a pair of towns, but a territorial unit rooted in valley systems, settlement hierarchies, and regional routes of interaction.

== Historical Sources ==
The earliest references to Sulaco-Manianí come from Spanish colonial documentation of the sixteenth century, especially records created in the context of conquest, tribute, resettlement, and administrative control. These sources must be used carefully. Lara Pinto warns that Honduran ethnohistory is fragmentary and that Spanish officials often recorded less information about Indigenous societies in Honduras than in areas such as central Mexico or highland Guatemala.

Spanish spellings of Indigenous place names were also unstable. Lara Pinto notes that colonial names did not always preserve their original orthography, partly because Spanish scribes wrote down unfamiliar languages according to what they heard and understood. This explains why names such as Manianí, Aramaní, and Lamaní may appear in different forms across time.

== Historical Development ==
Sulaco-Manianí likely emerged as a significant Indigenous territorial unit before or during the Late Postclassic period, although no known source provides an exact date of foundation. A cautious reconstruction would describe it as a regional Lenca-affiliated polity that became visible to Spanish observers in the early sixteenth century.

Its formation may have been related to the political importance of two principal settlements, Sulaco and Manianí, and their ability to organize or influence smaller communities within neighboring valleys. However, it is better to avoid presenting this as a confirmed “founding event” unless supported by a specific colonial source. What can be said with more confidence is that Spanish records treated Sulaco-Manianí as a recognizable Indigenous province composed of head towns and dependent settlements.

The area’s position in central Honduras would have allowed it to participate in broader networks of exchange between Mesoamerica and regions farther east and south. Archaeological research on Honduras has emphasized the country’s role in long-distance interaction networks. For example, studies of Postclassic Honduras describe local societies as important actors in exchange systems extending toward western Mesoamerica and southward into lower Central America. This broader regional context makes it plausible that Sulaco-Manianí was connected to trade, movement, and cultural exchange across central Honduras.

== Conquest and Colonial Incorporation ==
By the time Spanish conquest campaigns intensified in Honduras during the 1520s, central Honduras contained multiple Indigenous provinces and lordships. The Spaniards did not encounter a single unified Indigenous state, but rather a mosaic of local and regional political entities.

The Spanish invasion of Honduras involved competing expeditions and rival conquistadors, including figures connected to the campaigns of Gil González Dávila, Cristóbal de Olid, and Hernán Cortés. In this context, provinces such as Sulaco-Manianí became known to the Spaniards through military campaigns, tribute records, and administrative reorganization.

As Spanish control expanded, Indigenous political autonomy declined. Native communities were incorporated into colonial institutions such as encomienda, tribute systems, resettlement policies, and ecclesiastical jurisdictions. Linda Newson’s demographic work on colonial Honduras stresses that the Indigenous population of Honduras suffered severe disruption under Spanish colonial rule, although the demographic history remains difficult to reconstruct because of incomplete documentation.

Sulaco-Manianí’s autonomy likely disappeared gradually as its settlements were absorbed into Spanish colonial jurisdictions. Later documents, including seventeenth-century tribute and parish records, still preserve traces of older Indigenous territorial relationships. Lara Pinto notes that a 1689 tribute register for the Curato of Sulaco included Indigenous towns and suggests that colonial jurisdictions may have preserved, modified, or partially replaced earlier Indigenous geopolitical patterns.

== Government and Political Organization ==
Sulaco-Manianí may be described as a Lenca-affiliated chiefdom or lordship, possibly organized in a confederated or dual-centered manner. However, the word confederation should be used cautiously. It is useful as a modern descriptive term, but it does not mean that Sulaco-Manianí functioned like a modern federal state or a European monarchy. The political structure probably included one or more principal towns, and subordinate communities.

Lara Pinto’s discussion of the Spanish terms cabecera and sujeto is especially useful because it shows that the Spaniards understood Indigenous provinces as hierarchical territorial units. A cabecera functioned as a central town exercising some form of political control over dependent communities.

There are indications that Manianí may have held particular political importance. Lara Pinto describes Manianí as located in the northeastern portion of the Comayagua Valley and later notes that, like other important towns, it appears to have functioned as a cabecera. This does not necessarily mean that Manianí dominated Sulaco in a simple hierarchical way, but it does suggest that Manianí was more than a minor settlement.

== Society and Ethnic Composition ==
The population of Sulaco-Manianí was predominantly associated with the Lenca cultural and linguistic sphere, especially the Honduran Lenca world. The Lenca were one of the most important Indigenous peoples of pre-Hispanic and colonial Honduras, occupying large parts of western and central Honduras.

However, Sulaco-Manianí should not be imagined as ethnically or culturally isolated. Central Honduras was a zone of constant interaction among different Indigenous groups, languages, and ecological regions. Its northern and northeastern frontiers may have connected with Tolupan groups, while broader exchange networks linked central Honduras to both Mesoamerican and Intermediate Area traditions.

The linguistic situation also requires caution. Atanasio Herranz’s study of Honduran Lenca described the language as critically endangered by the late twentieth century and emphasized the poverty of surviving documentation. For the sixteenth century, this means that linguistic affiliation must often be reconstructed through place names, colonial references, settlement patterns, and later ethnographic evidence rather than through abundant written records in the Indigenous language itself.

== Economy and Regional Interaction ==
Sulaco-Manianí’s economy was probably based mainly on agriculture, local craft production, tribute relationships, and regional exchange. The Manianí/Lamaní etymology traditionally linked to pottery suggests that ceramic production may have been culturally remembered as significant in the area, although this should not be treated as direct proof of a sixteenth-century specialized pottery industry without archaeological confirmation.

The province’s central location made it strategically important. The Sulaco and Comayagua valleys were natural corridors connecting different regions of Honduras. In such a landscape, political power may have depended on control over agricultural lands, valley routes, river systems, and movement between highland and lowland zones.

Broader archaeological research supports the idea that Honduras was not a marginal or isolated region in pre-Hispanic times. Studies on Honduran exchange networks show that communities in the region participated in long-distance circulation of goods and cultural influences, including connections with western Mesoamerica and lower Central America.

== Historical Significance ==
The Sulaco-Manianí Lordship is significant because it illustrates the complexity of Indigenous political organization in central Honduras before and during the Spanish conquest. Rather than being a loose collection of villages, Sulaco-Manianí appears to have been a structured territorial unit composed of principal settlements, dependent communities, and regional spheres of influence.

Its history also shows the difficulty of reconstructing Honduras’s pre-Hispanic past. The available evidence comes mainly from Spanish colonial documents, later place-name traditions, archaeology, and ethnohistorical interpretation. These sources are valuable, but incomplete. For that reason, the history of Sulaco-Manianí should be written with a balance between reconstruction and caution.

Sulaco-Manianí was likely a Lenca-affiliated Indigenous province rooted in the valleys of central Honduras. It connected Sulaco, Manianí, and surrounding communities into a political landscape that was transformed — but not immediately erased — by Spanish conquest and colonial administration.

== See also ==
- Spanish conquest of Honduras
- Spanish conquest of Guatemala
- Comayagua
