= Council of Popular and Indigenous Organizations of Honduras =

Honduran indigenous organization

The Council of Popular and Indigenous Organizations of Honduras (COPINH) (Spanish: Consejo Cívico de Organizaciones Populares e Indígenas de Honduras) is a Honduran organization founded in 1993, dedicated to the defense of the environment in Intibucá and the defense of the indigenous Lenca people.

Known for its mobilizing capacity, it advocates for indigenous rights, participates in conflicts over resources, and opposes neoliberal economic policies, which it describes as "the pillage and re-colonization of our country." It has organized protests against water privatization, hydroelectric dams, and United States foreign policy. Anthropologist Mark Anderson describes it as "a pivotal force within the ethnic movement" in Honduras.

== History ==
COPINH was founded as the Civic Committee of Popular Organizations of Intibuca (Spanish: Comité Civico de Organizaciones Populares de Intibucá) on March 27, 1993 by human rights defender Berta Cáceres (Lenca). Soon thereafter, the organization began to focus on the Lenca people. The organization's 2004 history describes how the Lenca "began to discover their indigenous face, a face of resistance and national identity." In 1994, the organization affiliated with the Confederation of Autochthonous Peoples of Honduras (CONPAH). In the same year, Lenca activists from the group who wished to work more closely with the government and multilateral institutions created a rival Lenca organization, the National Indigenous Lenca Organization of Honduras (OLINH). By 1998, COPINH had adopted its current name.

Among its early acts in 1994, COPINH organized a march to the Honduran capital of Tegucigalpa demanding increased recognition of indigenous self-government through indigenous municipalities, a government moratorium on logging, and the investigation of violence against indigenous peoples, among other things. The Honduran government signed a 48-point agreement in response to the protests.

In October 1997, some 150 Lenca protesters led by COPINH destroyed a prominent statue of Christopher Columbus in Tegucigalpa. Leaders Salvador Zúñiga and Candido Martinez accepted responsibility, defending the action as protesting a history of exploitation of indigenous peoples. Zúñiga declared, "It would seem that in this country clay leaders matter more than the real problems faced by indigenous people. If there is justice, we will be released, but we are not sorry for the act of dignity carried out on October 12."

From 2013, Cáceres led COPINH and the local community in a year-long protest at the construction site of the DESA-backed Agua Zarca hydroelectric dam and project to prevent the companies from accessing the land by the Gualcarque River. Security officers regularly removed protesters from the site. On 15 July 2013, the Honduran military opened fire on the protesters, killing one member of COPINH, Tomás García, and injuring three others, including his 17-year-old son, Alan. The community reported regular threats and harassment from the company employees, security guards, and the military. In May 2014, members of COPINH were attacked in two separate incidents that resulted in two members dead and three seriously injured.

In late 2013, both Sinohydro and the International Finance Corporation withdrew from the project because of COPINH's protests. Desarrollos Energéticos (DESA) continued, however, moving the construction site to another location to avoid the blockade. Other local business leaders supported the project. Officials filed criminal charges against Cáceres and two other indigenous leaders for "usurpation, coercion and continued damages" against DESA for their roles in the protest, which was alleged to have incited others to cause damages to the company. In response to the charges, Amnesty International stated that, if the activists were imprisoned, Amnesty International would consider them prisoners of conscience. Dozens of regional and international organizations called upon the Honduran government to stop criminalizing the defense of human rights and to investigate threats against human rights defenders.

After Cáceres was found shot to death at home on March 3, 2016, the Inter-American Commission of Human Rights recommended precautionary measures for COPINH members. In mid-March, authorities moved to evict a COPINH-led land occupation in Río Chiquito, located in Rio Lindo, Cortés department. While returning to his home, community leader Nelson Garcia (also a Lenca) was fatally shot four times in the face and killed. A few weeks later, major international investors, the Netherlands Development Finance Co. (FMO), and FinnFund, announced they would suspend funding for the Agua Zarca project.

== The present ==
The danger continues for activists. In July 2016 Lesiba Yaneth, also a member of COPINH, was found killed. She had opposed the Aurora hydroelectric project, planned in the municipality of San Jose, in La Paz Province, Honduras. This project was very important to the government; "the vice-president of the National Congress, Gladys Aurora Lopez," was reported as having "direct ties" to it. On July 8, Secretary of Security Julian Pacheco said that the government had failed to provide adequate protection for Cáceres, who had received death threats. The police and military are expected to protect human rights defenders. Three suspects were arrested within a week in the Yaneth murder.

Bertha Zúñiga Cáceres, the daughter of the assassinated leader, Berta Cáceres, was elected general coordinator of the group in 2017.
