= Radio Progreso & ERIC-SJ =

Jesuit center in Honduras

Coordinates: 15°23′47.39″N 87°48′45.76″W

- Abbreviation: ERIC
- Established: January 1980; 46 years ago
- Purpose: Human rights advocacy
- Location: El Progreso, Yoro, Honduras
- Region served: Central America especially Honduras
- Director: Ismael Moreno Coto
- Affiliations: Jesuit, Catholic
- Website: ERIC-SJ
- Remarks: ERIC-SJ runs Radio Progreso

Radio Progreso & ERIC-SJ (Equipo de Reflexión, Investigación y Comunicación – ERIC) is a Jesuit center for reflection, research, and communications, founded in El Progreso, Honduras, in 1980. Its stated aim is to improve the human rights of the rural poor in Honduras. Its work has been extended to the rest of Central America.

== History ==
ERIC-SJ began from an initiative of Fernando Bandeiram, as a service to the Catholic parishes around El Progresso, Yoro District, to help the people reflect on the situation of their country as it impacted them. In May 1980 three other Jesuits joined Bandeiram and founded the Reflection, Research and Communication Center at what became Casa San Ignacio at the Jesuit property in El Progresso.

The work of the station and centre today includes grass-roots radio programming, training on human rights, urging greater government transparency and accountability, community organizing and empowerment, combating violence against women, formation of leadership committed to social change, and assisting returned migrants.

Patricia Murillo Gutiérrezstated that in a time when freedom of expression is not guaranteed in Honduras, Radio Progresso has contributed to the formation of a generation committed to ethics and politics, defended natural assets and territories, and promoted both a culture of peace and human rights and popular communication networks.

A survey taken by ERIC, consisting of 1,540 interviews between November 28 and December 8, 2012, and reported by Associated Press, showed the lack of confidence Hondurans had in their political culture.
