= Jeannette Kawas =

Honduran–Palestinian environmental activist (1946–1995)

- Born: Blanca Jeannette Kawas Fernández; 16 January 1946; Tela, Atlántida, Honduras
- Died: 6 February 1995 (aged 49); Tela, Atlántida, Honduras
- Cause of death: Homicide by firearm
- Occupation: Environmental activist
- Spouse: Jim Watt
- Children: 2

Blanca Jeannette Kawas Fernández (16 January 1946 – 6 February 1995) was a Honduran–Palestinian environmental activist known for her role in saving more than 400 species of flora and fauna.

== Biography ==
Kawas was born on 16 January 1946 in Tela, Atlántida to a Honduran–Palestinian family.

Kawas started her studies at the Miguel Paz Barahona School and earned her title of Expert Accountant and Certified Public Accountant in 1967, after which she began working in financial institutions during the 1970s.

In the early 1980s she moved with her children to the city of New Orleans, where she studied computation, obtaining various certificates, awards, and citations for her achievement and academic excellence. In the early 1990s she began working at the Honduran Ecology Association. Her activities and the progress made to preserve 449 plant species, diversity of flora and fauna, coastal lagoons, rocky outcrops, swamps, mangroves, rocky shores, sandy beaches, and rainforest located in a coastal strip of 40 kilometers, were an obstacle to business projects.

== Murder ==
On 6 February 1995 around 7:45 PM, Kawas was shot by two unidentified suspects at her house in Barrio El Centro in Tela, Atlántida. Among the murder suspects were Colonel Mario Amaya (known as Tigre Amaya), who reportedly met with sergeant Ismael Perdomo and Mario Pineda (a.k.a. Chapin) at the police headquarters in Tela.

=== Aftermath ===
Since there was no more interest on the Honduran justice system's part in resolving this crime, on 13 January 2003, the Team of Reflection, Research and Communication (ERIC) of the Society of Jesus and the Centre for International Justice (CEJIL) sent three individual requests to the Inter-American Commission on Human Rights, in which they declared the State of Honduras responsible for the murders of Jeannette Kawas, Carlos Escaleras, and Carlos Luna.

In 2005, the Inter-American Court of Human Rights found Kawas v. Honduras admissible; its ruling in 2009 set international legal precedent for the requirement that governments must protect at-risk environmental human rights defenders.

== Personal life ==
Between 1977 and 1979 she met and married Jim Watt, giving birth to two children, Damaris and Jaime.

== See also ==
- Jeannette Kawas National Park
- Berta Cáceres another Honduran environmentalist
- Margarita Murillo
- Lesbia Urquía
