= Ana Mirian Romero =

Honduran human rights activist

- Born: Santa Elena, La Paz, Honduras
- Known for: Land defending
- Awards: Front Line Defenders Award (2016)

Ana Mirian Romero is a Honduran human rights activist who won a Front Line Defenders Award in 2016

== Activism ==
Romero is a human rights activist based in Santa Elena, La Paz, Honduras. She a member of the Lenca Indigenous Movement a leader of the San Isidro Labrador Indigenous Council.

She campaigns against a hydroelectric dam, concerned about its impact on the natural resources. Her advocacy has made her the target death threats and of police violence, including in October 105 when her house was raided.

Romero won a Front Line Defenders Award in 2016. Former Irish president Mary Robinson gave her the award on the 9th June in Dublin. The trip to Ireland was her first international journey.

== Personal life ==
Romero lives with her husband and has five children, including a daughter who was born in 2016.

== See also ==
- Berta Cáceres
- Human rights in Honduras
- History of Honduras
