= Bertha Cáceres =

Honduran environmental activist and indigenous leader (1971–2016)

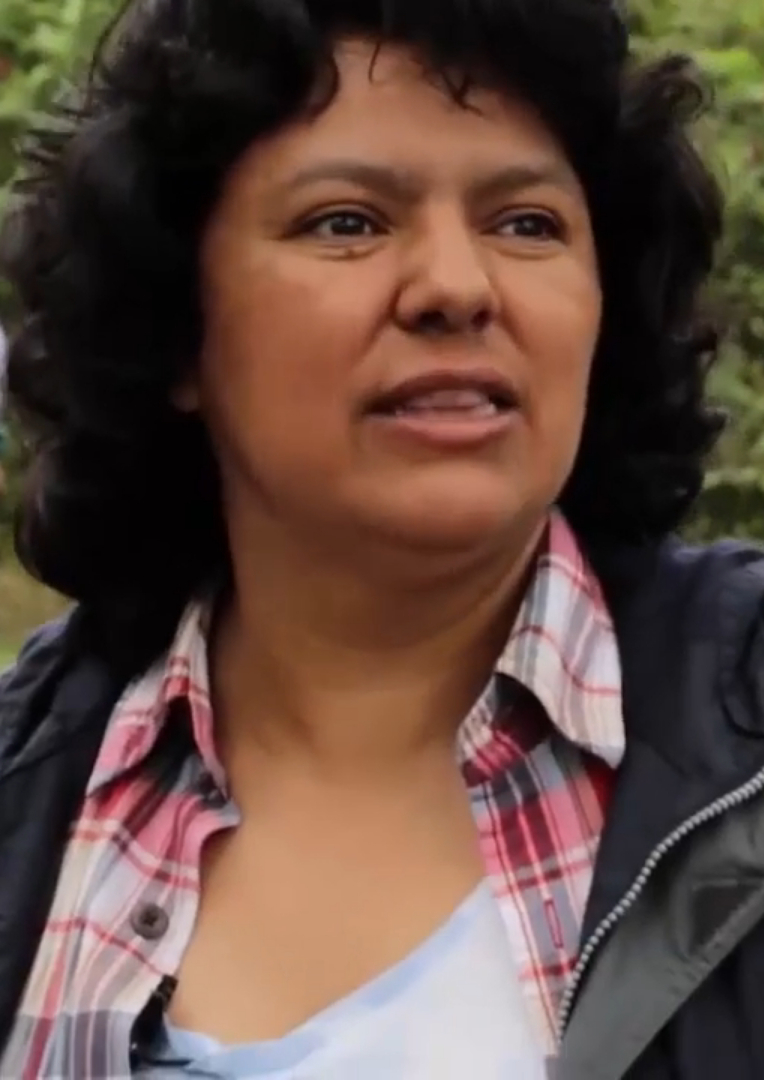
- Born: Bertha Isabel Cáceres Flores; 4 March 1971; La Esperanza, Honduras
- Died: 2 March 2016 (aged 44); La Esperanza, Honduras
- Cause of death: Assassination by firearm
- Occupations: Environmentalist, indigenous rights activists
- Years active: 1993–2016
- Known for: Defending Lenca people's habitat and rights, and blocking dam at Río Gualcarque, for which she won Goldman Prize
- Children: 4, including Bertha

Bertha Isabel Cáceres Flores (Spanish pronunciation: [ˈbeɾtajsaˈβel ˈkaseɾes ˈfloɾes]; 4 March 1971 – 2 March 2016) was a Honduran (Lenca) environmental activist, indigenous leader, co-founder and coordinator of the Council of Popular and Indigenous Organizations of Honduras (COPINH). She won the Goldman Environmental Prize, one of the most prestigious awards for environmental activism, in 2015 for "a grassroots campaign that successfully pressured the world's largest dam builder to pull out of the Agua Zarca Dam" at the Río Gualcarque.

In 2016 she was assassinated in her home by armed intruders, after many years of threats against her life. A former soldier, with the US-trained special forces units of the Honduran military, asserted that Cáceres' name was on their hitlist for months prior to her assassination. As of February 2017, three of the eight arrested people have been linked to the US-trained elite military troops. Two had been trained at Fort Benning, Georgia, USA, at the former School of the Americas (SOA), now known as the Western Hemisphere Institute for Security Cooperation, or WHINSEC. Having been founded in 2001, WHINSEC has since been linked to thousands of murders and human rights violations in Latin America by its graduates. In November 2017, a team of international legal experts released a report finding "willful negligence by financial institutions." For example, the Central American Bank for Economic Integration (CABEI), the Netherlands Development Finance Institution (FMO) and the Finnfund pursued a strategy with shareholders, executives, managers, and employees of the Honduran company Desarrollos Energeticos SA (DESA), private security companies working for DESA, public officials and State security agencies "to control, neutralize and eliminate any opposition".

Twelve land defenders were killed in Honduras in 2014, according to research by Global Witness, making it the most dangerous country in the world, relative to its size, for activists protecting forests and rivers. Berta Cáceres' murder was followed by those of two more activists within the same month.

In July 2021, Roberto David Castillo, the former president of DESA, was found guilty of being a co-conspirator in her murder, and sentenced to 22 and a half years in prison.

== Early life ==
Berta Isabel Cáceres Flores was born in La Esperanza, Honduras into the Lenca people, a predominant Indigenous group in southwestern Honduras. The youngest of 12, she grew up in the 1970s during a time of civil unrest and violence in Central America. Her mother Austra Bertha Flores Lopez was a role model of humanitarianism: She was a midwife, assisting in thousands of natural births in the Honduran countryside, and social activist who took in and cared for refugees from El Salvador. Austra Flores was elected and served as a two-term mayor of their hometown of La Esperanza, as a congresswoman, and as a governor of the Department of Intibucá.

After attending local schools, Cáceres studied education at a university and graduated with a teaching qualification. Fr. Ismael Moreno, a priest and director of Radio Progreso & ERIC-SJ, became a close friend and collaborator of Cáceres.

== Activism ==
In 1993, as a student activist, Cáceres co-founded the Council of Popular and Indigenous Organizations of Honduras (COPINH), an organization to support indigenous people's rights in Honduras. She led campaigns on a wide variety of issues, including protesting illegal logging, plantation owners, and the presence of US military bases on Lenca land. She supported feminism, LGBT rights, as well as wider social and indigenous issues. Early on in her life of activism, she understood the value and the implications of the LGBT struggle, as she recognized that they experienced the same discrimination and oppression that her and her people did.

In 2006, a group of indigenous Lenca people from Río Blanco asked Cáceres to investigate the recent arrival of construction equipment in their area. Cáceres duly investigated and informed the community that a joint venture project between Chinese company Sinohydro, the World Bank's International Finance Corporation, and Honduran company Desarrollos Energéticos, S.A., also known as DESA, had plans to construct a series of four hydroelectric dams on the Gualcarque River.

The developers had breached international law by failing to consult with the local people on the project. The Lenca were concerned that the dams would compromise their access to water, food and materials for medicine, and therefore threaten their traditional way of life. Cáceres worked together with the community to mount a protest campaign. She organized legal actions and community meetings against the project, and took the case to the Inter-American Commission on Human Rights.

From 2013, Cáceres led COPINH and the local community in a year-long protest at the construction site to prevent the companies from accessing the land. Security officers regularly removed protesters from the site. On 15 July 2013, the Honduran military opened fire on the protesters, killing one member of COPINH, Tomás García, and injuring three others, including his 17-year-old son, Alan. The community reported regular threats and harassment from the company employees, security guards, and the military. In May 2014, members of COPINH were attacked in two separate incidents that resulted in two members dead and three seriously injured.

In late 2013, both Sinohydro and the International Finance Corporation withdrew from the project because of COPINH's protests. Desarrollos Energéticos (DESA) continued, however, moving the construction site to another location to avoid the blockade. Other local business leaders supported the project. Officials filed criminal charges against Cáceres and two other indigenous leaders for "usurpation, coercion and continued damages" against DESA for their roles in the protest, which was alleged to have incited others to cause damages to the company. In response to the charges, Amnesty International stated that, if the activists were imprisoned, Amnesty International would consider them prisoners of conscience. Dozens of regional and international organizations called upon the Honduran government to stop criminalizing the defense of human rights and to investigate threats against human rights defenders.

On 20 February 2016, more than 100 protesters were detained by security while protesting, and threats against their organization began to increase.

Cáceres singled out Hillary Clinton for her involvement in legitimizing the 2009 Honduran coup d'état:

"The return of the president, Mel Zelaya, became a secondary issue. There were going to be elections in Honduras. And here, she, Clinton, recognized that they didn't permit Mel Zelaya's return to the presidency. There were going to be elections. And the international community—officials, the government, the grand majority—accepted this, even though we warned this was going to be very dangerous and that it would permit a barbarity, not only in Honduras but in the rest of the continent. And we've been witnesses to this."

Clinton claimed that her method of handling the situation was better for the Honduran people.

== Threats and human rights concerns ==
The Inter-American Commission on Human Rights (IACH) included "Bertha Cáceres" [sic] on its 28 June 2009 list of people under threat during the 2009 Honduran coup d'état. The following day the IACH issued so-called "precautionary measures (MC 196-09)" in defense of her and other activists, while acknowledging reports that military forces had surrounded her home.

In 2013, Cáceres told Al Jazeera:

The army has an assassination list of 18 wanted human rights fighters with my name at the top. I want to live, there are many things I still want to do in this world but I have never once considered giving up fighting for our territory, for a life with dignity, because our fight is legitimate. I take lots of care but in the end, in this country where there is total impunity I am vulnerable... When they want to kill me, they will do it.

During the campaign against the dam, Cáceres and other organizers were frequently intimidated by the military; on one occasion they were stopped and their vehicle was searched while traveling to Rio Blanco. Cáceres claimed that during this search, a gun was planted in the vehicle; the organisers were subsequently arrested on weapons charges and detained overnight in jail. The court placed Cáceres under precautionary measures, forcing her to sign in at the court every week and preventing her from leaving the country. The measures were in effect until the case was dismissed in February 2014.

Court records from 2014 publicized in May 2016 showed that "the government and DESA repeatedly sought to tar Caceres and her colleagues as violent anarchists bent on terrorizing the population through their protests, [...] usurpation, coercion and continued damage and even attempting to undermine the democratic order."

One of Berta's favorite expressions was "They are afraid of us because we are not afraid of them," according to Mexican environmentalist Gustavo Castro Soto.

== Honors and legacy ==
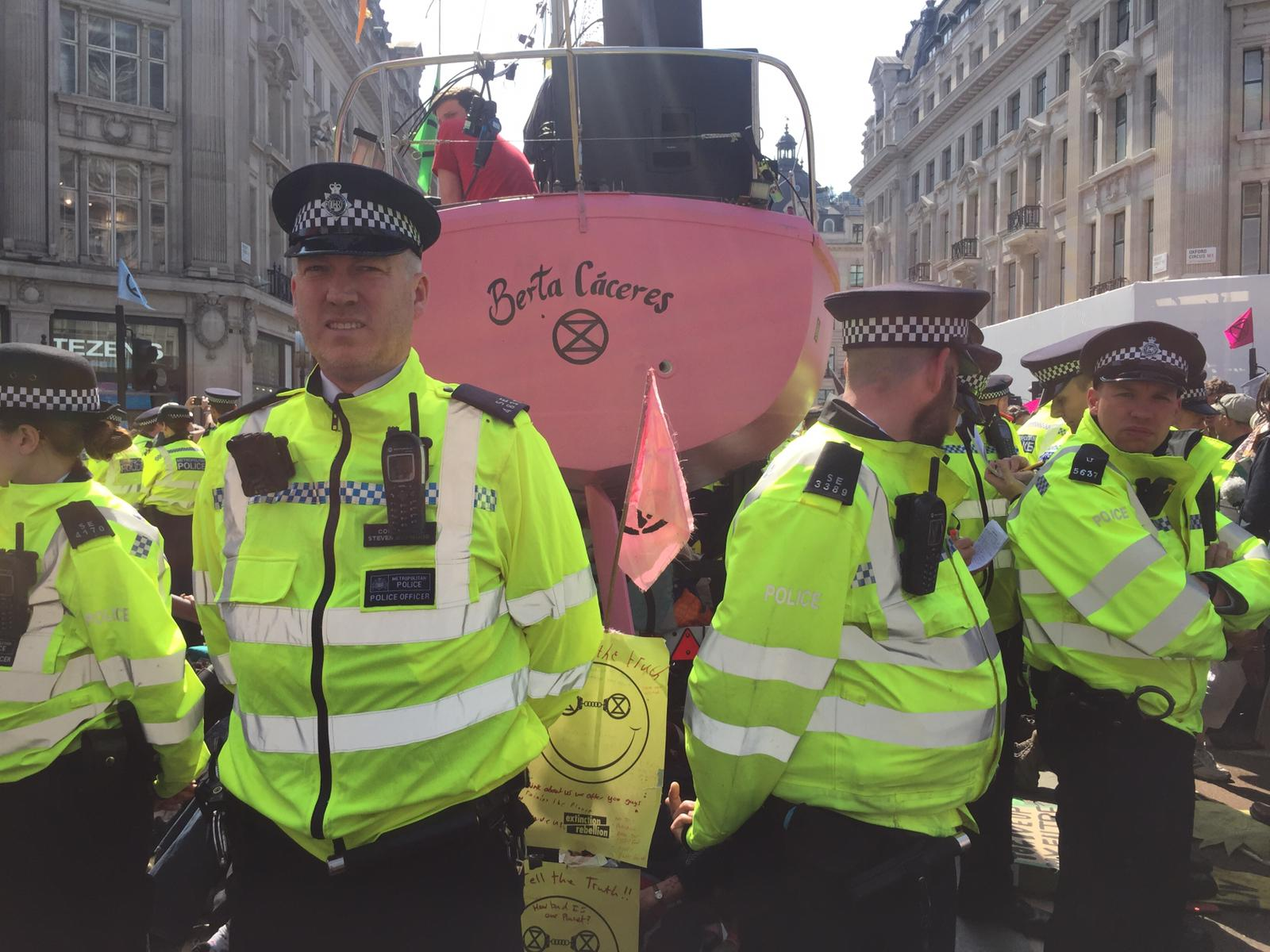
The boat named after her by Extinction Rebellion in Oxford Circus

- In 2012, Cáceres was awarded the Shalom Award by the Society for Justice and Peace at the Catholic University of Eichstätt-Ingolstadt.
- In 2014, she was nominated as a finalist for the Front Line Defenders Prize.
- In 2015, she was awarded the Goldman Environmental Prize.
- In April 2015, the international human rights organization Global Witness highlighted Cáceres' case as emblematic of the severe risks environmental activists face in Honduras, which had the highest number of killings of environmental and land defenders per capita in the world.
- In December 2018, ecologists Erich P. Hofmann and Josiah H. Townsend named a newly identified Honduran anole species after her with the binomial name Anolis caceresae with a common name of Berta's anole.
- In April 2019, the Extinction Rebellion group fixed a pink boat named Berta Cáceres in the centre of London's busy intersection of Oxford Street and Regent Street (Oxford Circus) and glued themselves to it, blocking traffic; it was removed by police with angle grinders after five-days.
- In March 2021, Singer & Songwriter Damien Rice, along with JFDR, Sandrayati Fay wrote a song inspired by the Honduran environment activist 'Song for Berta', which honored the activist on her 50th birthday, with all the sales & royalties of the record proceeding to Council of Popular and Indigenous Organizations of Honduras.
- In December 2021, a new species of Carpotroche, a small tree native to eastern Honduras and Nicaragua, was named in her honor.
- In January 2026, the Central Bank of Honduras released into circulation a new 200 lempira banknote which pays tribute to Berta Cáceres; the banknote features her portrait.

== Assassination ==
Cáceres was shot dead in her home by armed intruders on the night of 2 March 2016. Mexican environmental activist Gustavo Castro Soto was also wounded, by two gunshots, to the cheek and the hand. Gustavo had arrived in La Esperanza a day prior for a meeting with 80 others "to discuss alternatives to the hydro-electric project". Berta invited him to stay at her place for the night, "as her place had a better internet connection than his accommodation".

He said:

I was working on a presentation when I heard a loud bang. I thought something had fallen, but when Berta screamed, 'Who's there?', I knew it was bad, that it was the end. [...] When the hitman arrived, I covered my face. He was three meters away. I moved as he fired, and the bullet passed my ear. He thought he'd killed me. It's a miracle I survived.

Under the so-called "precautionary measures" recommended by the Inter-American Commission on Human Rights, the Honduran government was required to protect Cáceres, but on the day of her death she was not under any protection. The Honduran security minister said that she was not at the place which she had identified as her home. She had recently moved into a new house in La Esperanza.

Cáceres is survived by her four children with former husband and co-leader, Salvador Zúniga.

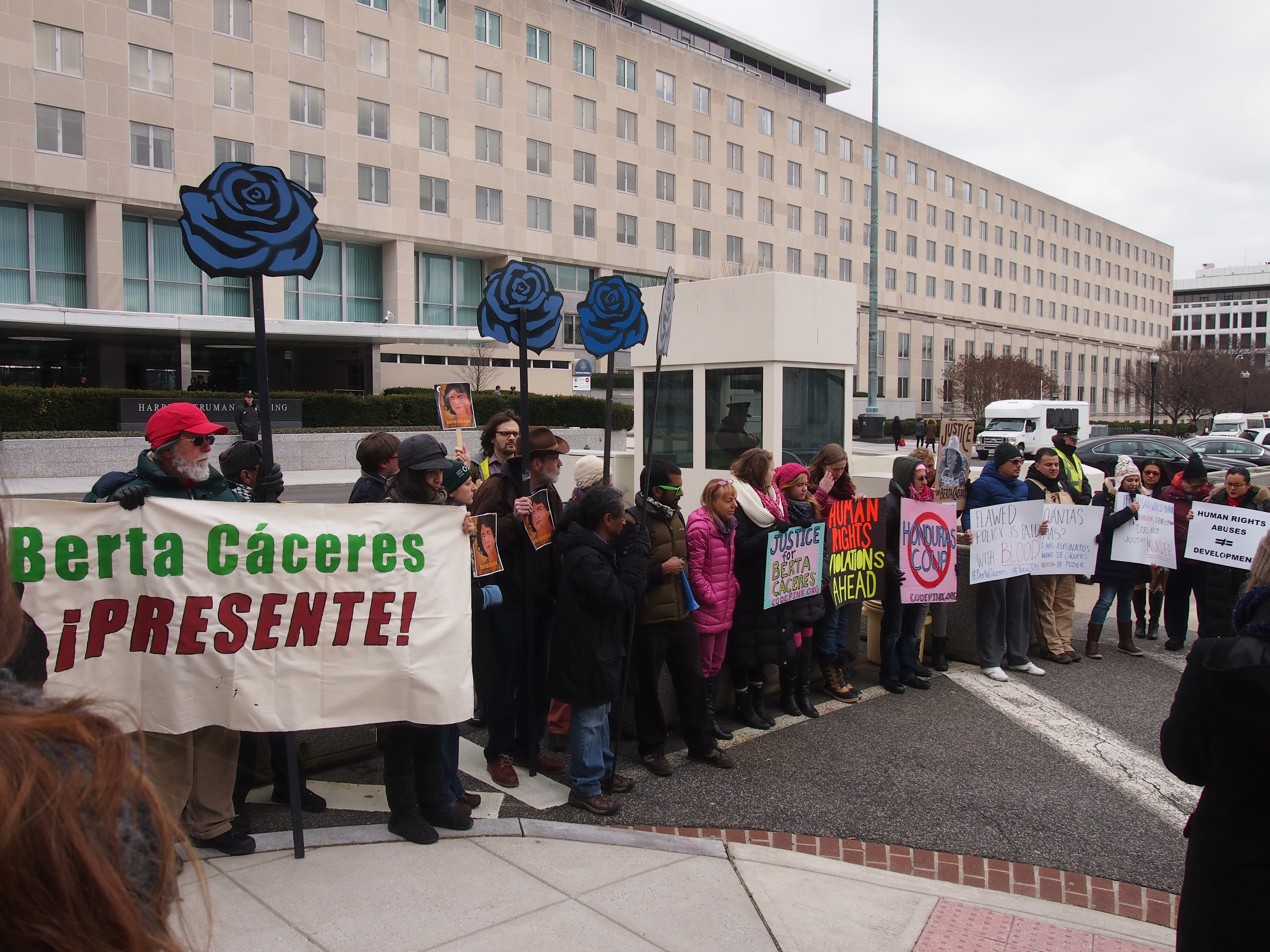
"Justice for Berta Cáceres!" protest in Washington, D.C.

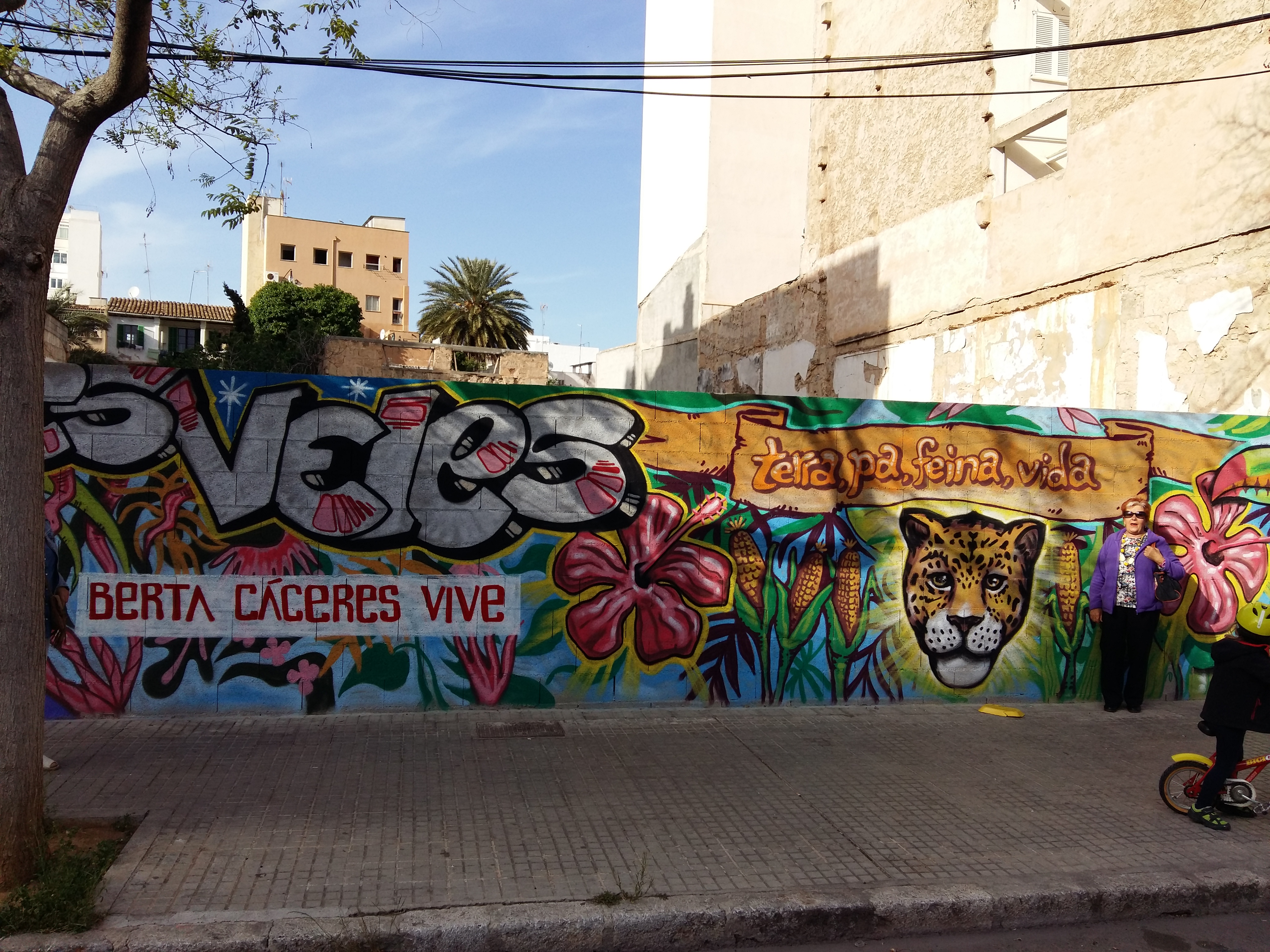
A graffiti tribute to Berta Cáceres in Palma, Spain

=== Reactions ===
Berta Isabel Zúniga Cáceres, the then-25-year-old daughter of Berta Cáceres, said in an interview she holds the company that wanted to build the Agua Zarca hydroelectric dam responsible for her mother's death. She said it is "very easy to pay people to commit murders in Honduras, but those who are behind this are other powerful people with money and an apparatus that allows them to commit these crimes" and that "they had paid assassins on several occasions to kill her."

Cáceres' death was widely condemned, with calls for an investigation coming from the Organization of American States (OAS), the U.S. Ambassador to Honduras, and the United Nations High Commissioner for Human Rights. Honduran president Juan Orlando Hernández declared the investigation of the murder a priority, and Luis Almagro, the Secretary General of the OAS, reiterated the OAS's previous call for special protection of indigenous human rights defenders in Honduras.

Other expressions of support came from American actor and environmentalist Leonardo DiCaprio, Canadian author and activist Naomi Klein, Amnesty International, Puerto Rican singer René Pérez of Calle 13, former Colombian senator Piedad Córdoba, Oxfam, the Mayor of Barcelona Ada Colau, U.S. Senator Patrick Leahy, and Venezuelan president Nicolás Maduro.

A group of around 100 COPINH members marched to the provincial police station after her death, to demand an independent international investigation into her murder. There was a protest at the Harry S. Truman Building, in Washington, D.C. On 4 March 2016, students at the National Autonomous University of Honduras staged a protest over Cáceres' death, angry that she was not given more protection during her lifetime, demanding an independent investigation and throwing rocks, while police used tear gas to break up violent clashes during the protest. Protests were also held outside the Embassy of Honduras in Bogotá, San Cristóbal de las Casas, Vienna, Berlin, and Barcelona.

=== Investigation results ===
==== 2016 ====
On 3 March 2016, the day of her death, government officials performed an autopsy of Cáceres' body without oversight, even though her family had requested an independent forensics expert, an independent investigation by the Inter-American Commission on Human Rights. The same day, the government began its investigation and activated its Violent Crimes Unit (Unidad de Delitos Violentos) on the case, which coordinates its work with the United States. COPINH member Aureliano Molina Villanueva was detained on 3 March as a suspect in the killing. COPINH denounced this action, saying it was an attempt to falsely blame him for the murder. On 5 March, Molina was released for lack of evidence linking him to the crime. Security guard José Ismael Lemus was also detained and released. Judicial orders required Ismael and Castro, the sole survivor of the attack, to remain in the country as the investigation continued.

Attack survivor and sole witness Castro later said he was "paraded through ministries and court houses, ordered to tell his story over and over again,[...] prevented from leaving the country for a month and effectively treated as a suspect [...]. After a month, the judge in charge of the case suspended my lawyer. They violated all my rights. I was very scared every day. I thought that something could happen to me at any time. I felt like a scapegoat."

In a 5 March press conference, Cáceres' four children: Olivia, Berta, Laura, and Salvador, expressed their lack of confidence in the Honduran government investigation. Describing their mother's murder as a political act, they called for an international investigation into the homicide. On 6 March 2016, President Hernández asked UN High Commissioner on Human Rights Zeid bin Ra'ad Al-Hussein to assist in the investigation into Cáceres' death.

In the days following the murder, an Amnesty International (AI) delegation met with the Minister of Human Rights, Justice, Interior and Decentralization and representatives from the Ministry of Security, the Ministry of Foreign Affairs, the Attorney General's Office, the Prosecutor's Office, and civil society, as well as Cáceres' family members. Amnesty criticized President Hernández for his refusal to meet with Cáceres' relatives, human rights defenders, and AI. Amnesty condemned "the Honduran government's absolute lack of willingness to protect human rights defenders in the country" and noted that the Honduran authorities had failed "to follow the most basic lines of investigation, including the fact that Berta had been receiving serious death threats related to her human rights work for a very long time."

One month after Cáceres' death, Honduran authorities announced that on 13 March they had searched DESA's offices and taken testimonies from the company's employees.

On 2 May 2016, the government arrested four men; one is DESA's manager for social and environmental issues, another a former employee of a security company hired by DESA; the other two are an army major and a retired captain. The US ambassador to Honduras applauded the government.

In June 2016, a former soldier with the US-trained special forces units of the Honduran military confirmed that Caceres' name was on their hitlist months before her assassination.

==== 2017 ====
In February 2017 The Guardian reported, that three of eight people arrested are linked to the US-trained elite troops. Two, namely Maj Mariano Díaz and Lt Douglas Giovanny Bustillo, received military training at Fort Benning, Georgia, USA the former School of the Americas (SOA), renamed WHINSEC, linked to thousands of murders and human rights violations in Latin America.

In November 2017, a team of international legal experts (GAIPE) released a report detailing their findings, which establish "the willful negligence by financial institutions" as for example the Central American Bank for Economic Integration (CABEI), the Netherlands Development Finance Company (FMO) and the Finnfund. GAIPE found "the participation of executives, managers and employees of DESA, of private security personnel hired by the company, of state agents and parallel structures to State security forces in crimes committed before, during and after March 2, 2016, the day of the assassination."

=== Arrests and trials ===
==== 2018 ====
In March 2018, Honduran authorities arrested a former military intelligence officer David Castillo, accused of masterminding Cáceres' murder. This new arrest, of the executive president of the company building the dam which Cáceres campaigned against, was the ninth person arrested for the murder, and the fourth with ties to the Honduran military. In September 2018, Honduras' Supreme Court suspended indefinitely the trial of eight men accused of Cáceres murder. After the trial resumed, seven of the eight men were convicted of murder in November 2018.

==== 2019 ====
Sentencing was delayed until December 2019. At that time, the four assassins were sentenced to 34 years for the murder of Berta Cáceres, plus 16 years for the attempted murder of Gustavo Castro Soto. The three other defendants received 30-year sentences for helping to organize the assassination.

==== 2021 ====
On 6 July 2021, David Castillo, former president of the hydroelectric corporation DESA, was found guilty of plotting the assassination of Berta Cáceres by the Honduran Supreme Court in a unanimous ruling. The trial lasted 49 days. The ruling stated that Castillo used paid informants and military contacts to monitor Cáceres. Castillo coordinated, planned and obtained the money to pay for the assassination.

==== 2022 ====
On June 20, 2022 David Castillo was sentenced to 22 years and 6 months in prison.

== Awards ==
- In 2012, The Society for Justice and Peace awarded Cáceres the Shalom Award.
- In 2015, she won the Goldman Environmental Prize.
- In 2016, she received the UN's highest environmental honor, the Champions of the Earth award.

== See also ==
- Femicides in Honduras
- Ana Mirian Romero
- Máxima Acuña, Peruvian water activist
- Jeannette Kawas, slain Honduran environmentalist
