= Gualcarque River =

- Location within Honduras
- Native name: Río Gualcarque (Spanish)

Location
- Country: Honduras
- Departments: Intibucá and Santa Bárbara

Physical characteristics
- Source: Reserva Biológica Opalaca
  - location: San Francisco de Opalaca
  - coordinates: 14°31′N 88°18′W
- Mouth
  - location: Río Grande de Otoro
  - coordinates: 14°45′39″N 89°09′45″W

Basin features
- River system: Ulúa

The Gualcarque River (Spanish: Río Gualcarque) is a river in Intibucá, western Honduras. It is sacred to the indigenous Lenca, who depend on the river for their subsistence. It is the site of the proposed Agua Zarca hydroelectric dam, a joint Honduran-Chinese project.

Since 2006, Sinohydro, the World Bank's International Finance Corporation (IFC), and Honduran company Desarrollos Energéticos (DESA) have made preparations for four hydroelectric dams without consulting the Lenca, including the Agua Zarca dam. Construction began in 2012, and in 2013 river access was blocked, after which the Lenca started to protest. They have been met with violence, detention and torture.

In July 2013 during a peaceful protest near the dam construction site, Tomas García was shot and killed, allegedly by the Honduran Army. In March 2016, Berta Cáceres, an internationally known indigenous activist who was a leader of the opposition to the dam, was also shot and killed. In June 2017, the banks financing the project suspended and withdrew funding because of the controversy.

== Geography ==
The Gualcarque originates in the Reserva Biológica Opalaca in Intibucá flowing eastward for 2.4 miles (3.9 km) to the reserve's border, where it is crossed by the only road in its entire course, the V-608. It then turns to the north, flowing through the entire length of the Reserva de Vida Silvestre Montaña Verde at its eastern border and upon exiting it discharges into the Río Grande de Otoro.

The river is considered sacred to the indigenous Lenca. It provides drinking water, is used to fish, irrigate fields, and is used for washing. Berta Cáceres has stated: "In our worldviews, we are beings who come from the Earth, from the water and from corn. The Lenca people are ancestral guardians of the rivers, in turn protected by the spirits of young girls, who teach us that giving our lives in various ways for the protection of the rivers is giving our lives for the well-being of humanity and of this planet."

The Gualcarque River belongs to the geothermal sites in northwest Honduras, the Azacualpa thermal springs, surrounding the Yojoa Lake, which is affected by a rough east–west extensional tectonic regime and by Holocene magmatism. The river emerges from a north-northwest to south-south east trending normal fault system just southwest of the Yojoa Lake. Water samples had the lowest measured temperature at 52.5 °C (126.5 °F) and the lowest salinity in the whole Azacualpa area, where thermal springs abound.

== Development ==
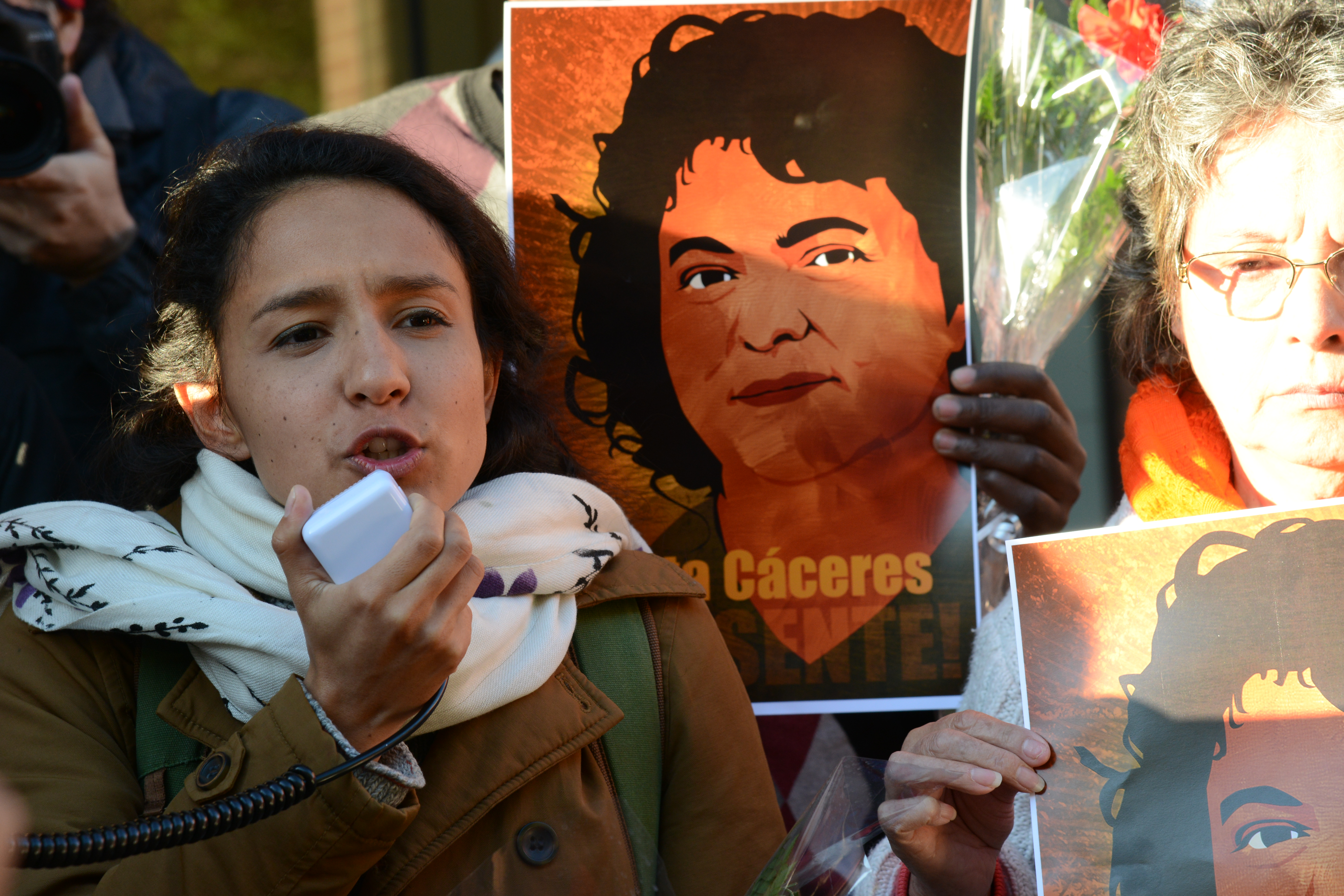
Cáceres' daughter at a protest in Washington D.C. in April 2016, with a portrait of Berta Cáceres

Since 2006, the Chinese company Sinohydro, the World Bank's International Finance Corporation (IFC), and Honduran company Desarrollos Energéticos S.A. (DESA) had been planning to construct four hydroelectric dams at the Gualcarque, the so-called Agua Zarca Dam. DESA financed the projects by loans from the FMO, Finnish finance company FinnFund and the Central American Bank of Economic Integration. The purpose was to create a 300 metres (980 ft) long reservoir, divert 3 kilometres (1.9 mi) of the river and generate 22 MW hydroelectric power. When construction machinery arrived in 2006, community members of Río Blanco asked the National Council of Popular and Indigenous Organizations of Honduras (COPINH) for help; the Lenca have said that the project would "jeopardize their water resource and livelihood" and that they have not been consulted about the project, per international law. Together with Berta Cáceres, they organized a local assembly which formally voted against the dam, filed complaints with government authorities in Tegucigalpa, organized and conducted protests against the project, and brought the case to the Inter-American Human Rights Commission.

In 2012, DESA started construction on the land it had acquired, destroying corn and bean fields, fruit trees and coffee plantations. At the end of March 2013 DESA security officers blocked access to the river, and affected communities started a street blockade. Protesters were "attacked with machetes, discredited, detained, and tortured", and a leader from Río Blanco named Tomas García was shot and killed during a peaceful protest.

In late 2013, Sinohydro terminated its contract with DESA; the IFC, concerned about human rights violations, withdrew its funding. In March 2016, Berta Cáceres was shot in her home and killed as well. FMO and Finnfund suspended their loans 16 days after her assassination. In 2021, a court ruled that Roberto David Castillo, President of the dam company, DESA, had planned the murder and hired the gunmen.

In June 2017, the banks financing the project suspended and withdrew funding because of the controversy.

== See also ==
- List of rivers of Honduras
