= Lenca =

Honduran-Salvadoran native group

- Lenca flag

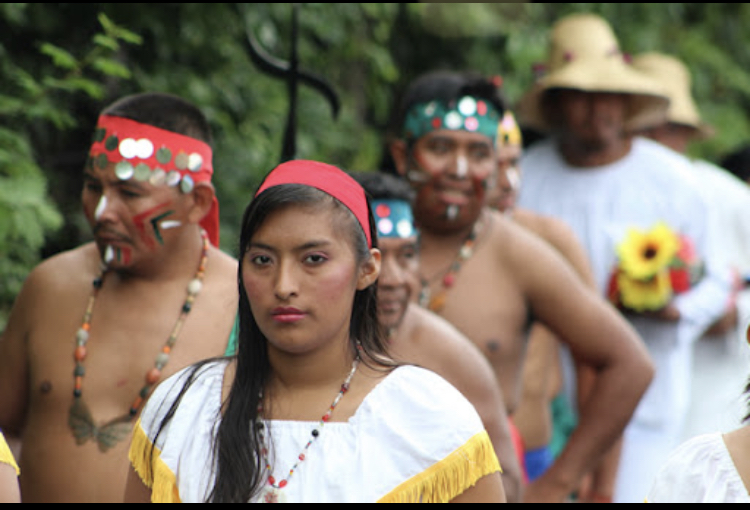
- Lenca people in El Salvador (2014)

Total population
- 453,670

Regions with significant populations
- Honduras: 360,611 (est. 60% of tribal Hondurans)
- El Salvador: 89,389 (est.)

Languages
- Honduran Spanish • Salvadoran Spanish • Lenca language

Religion
- Roman Catholic, Lencan mythology

Related ethnic groups
- Cacaopera, Xinca, Chibcha

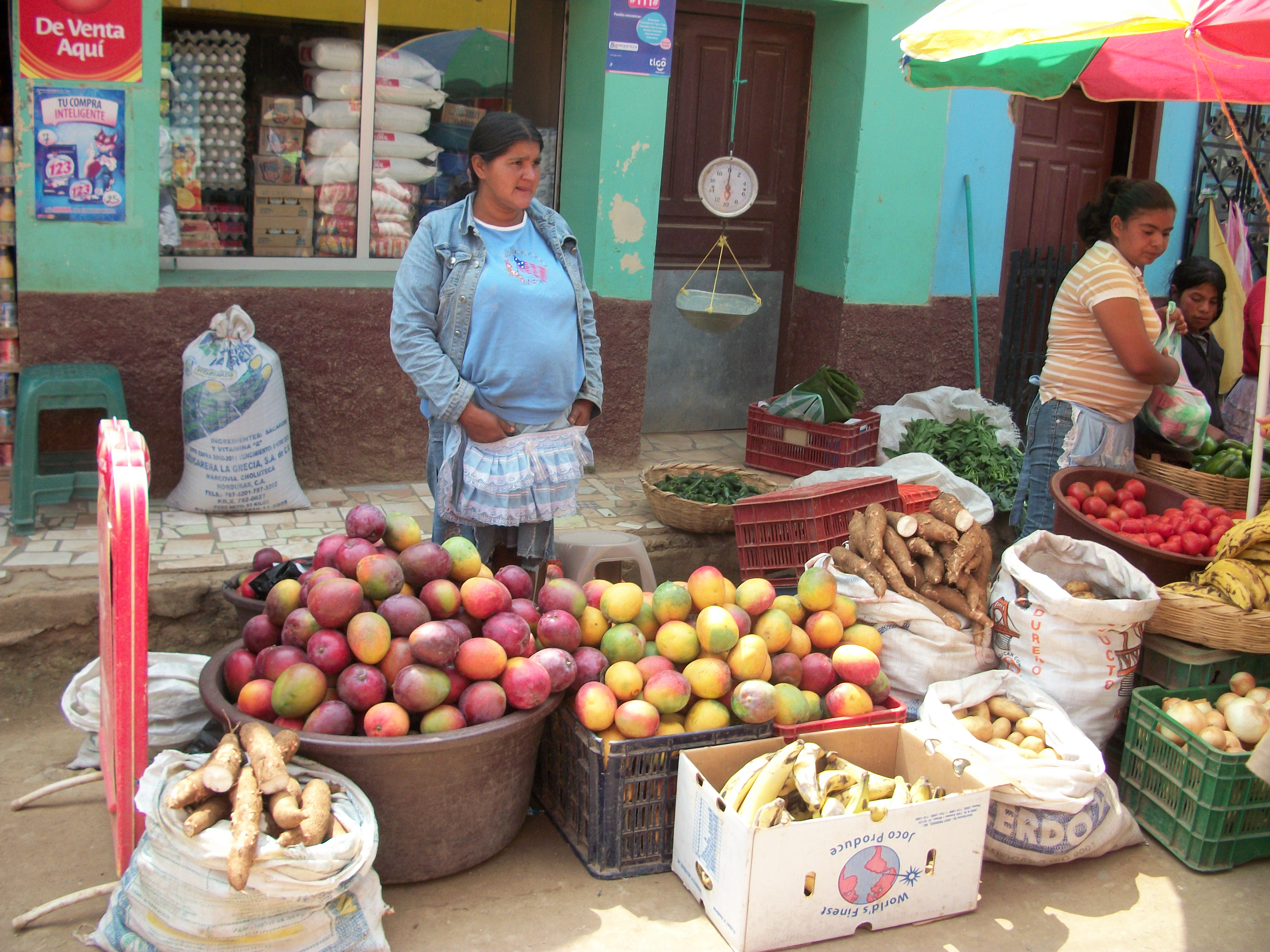
Lencas at a market in La Esperanza, Honduras

The Lenca are an Indigenous people from present day southwest Honduras and eastern El Salvador in Central America. They historically spoke various dialects of the Lencan languages such as Chilanga, Putun (Potón), and Kotik, but today are mostly native speakers of Spanish. In Honduras, the Lenca are the largest Indigenous group, with an estimated population of more than 450,000.

== Name ==
The term 'Lenca' is of unknown origin and probably is an exonym originating from a language other than Lenca itself. The suggestion that it comes from le(m) (wattle) and ke (stone) is unlikely. The earliest known references in western discourse about the term Lenca dates back to 1548, in the Provanzas de Juan Ruiz de la Vega. Raphael Girard, who wrote about the origin of the Kʼicheʼ and other Maya groups, also addresses a brief section on the question of the Lenca. According to one theory, the word "Lenca" originated from the Taulepa subgroup, and means "the common wealth of the people". Efraim Squier established the term "Lenca" in 1859 as a blanket term covering all of the historic subgroups, taking it from the autonym of the Indigenous people of Guajiquiro.

Historically, certain Lenca subgroups were referred to as Chontal or Pupuluca, both of which are generic Nahuatl terms for non-Nahuas.

== History ==
=== Precolonial era ===
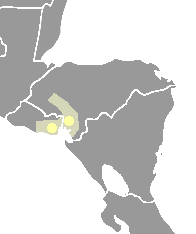
Suspected extension of the historical Lenca people

Since pre-European times, the Lencas occupied various areas of what is now known as Honduras and El Salvador. The Salvadoran archaeological site of Quelepa (which was inhabited from the preclassic period to the beginning of the early postclassic period) is considered a site that was inhabited and ruled by the Lencas. Another important center of the Lencas is Yarumela in the Comayagua Valley of central Honduras, which was an active city in the late preclassic and early classic periods; archaeologists have come to believe that it was a very important commercial center for this culture. Other minor settlements are Tenampúa and Los Naranjos, also located in central Honduras.

The Lencas were historically divided into multiple subgroups, each with their own dialect. These include the Care (in the departments of Intibucá, La Paz, northern Lempira and southern Santa Bárbara), the Cerquín (in central and southern Lempira and southern Intibucá), the Potón (in El Salvador and the islands of the Gulf of Fonseca), the Taulepa (on the shores of Lake Yojoa), the Colo (in Agalteca and the Comayagua Valley), the Ulua (in the Pacific lowlands of Honduras) and the Xucap or Jucap (north of the Jicatuyo River in Santa Bárbara).

At the beginning of the 16th century, each subgroup had its own confederation, such as the Lordship of Sulaco-Manianí corresponding to the location of the Colo group. Each confederation was ruled by one supreme lord and was divided into several manors, themselves constituted by several towns. Each town was governed by a main head man who was assisted by four lieutenants who helped him in the tasks of their society. He was succeeded by his first-born or selected by the clan mothers. Lenca towns, found in valleys or occasionally on fortified crags, were comparatively small and mainly constructed out of adobe rather than stone.

Wars were not common, except when clan members tried to overthrow the leadership. Lencas were multilingual, learning languages such as Nahuat, Chʼortiʼ, Xinca, Mangue etc. for the purpose of trade. At certain times of the year, the different Lenca lordships agreed to truces, which are remembered by the Lencas as the wankasku (Guancasco) ceremony.

Lenca society was divided into nobility (including priests and justices) and commoners, and the latter paid tribute to the former in honey and cotton cloaks. The commoner Lencas dedicated themselves mainly to planting cornfields, roots such as yuca (manioke), potato (patewa), sweet potato (kumarewa), cacao (kaukau), beans, squash, chiles, cotton, etc. This was supplemented by hunting deer, armadillo, agouti, paca, wild turkey, duck and macaw using wooden lances and bows with poisoned arrows. The Lencas used a version of the 365-day Mesoamerican calendar composed of 18 months (veintenas) of twenty days each.

The Lenca population in the early 16th century may have been more than 500,000, and this likely made the Lenca region a source of slaves for neighboring Maya and Pipil polities. Resources exported by the region included honey, cacao, and in the northeast part of their territory, gold and other minerals.

=== Spanish conquest ===
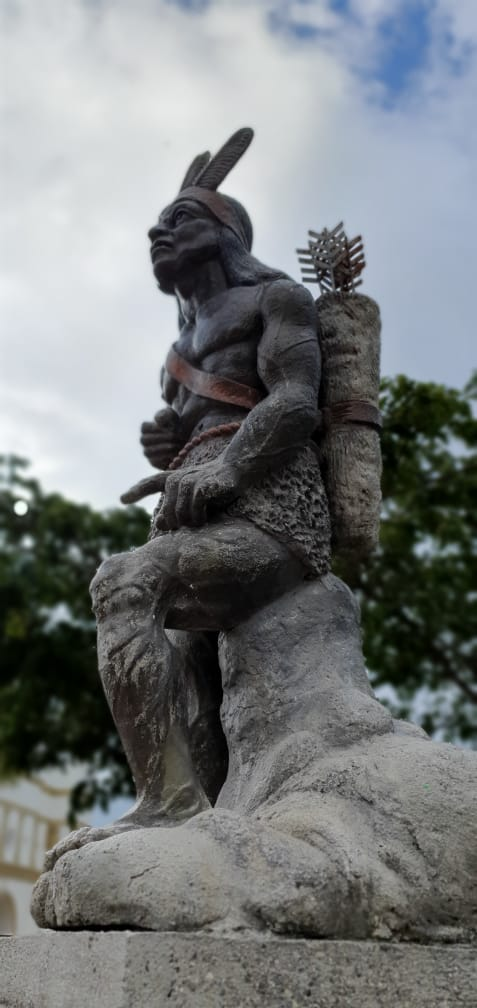
Monument to Lempira, Lencan sovereign ruler.

During the conquest, Lenca towns were evangelized. Some more conservative communities resisted converting to Catholicism, while others converted more peacefully. Only five Lencas are named in conquest-era Spanish documents: Antú Silan Ulap, Lempira, Mota, Entepica, and Guancince.

Lempira organized a war of resistance that lasted about twelve years and ended with his death in 1537. When the Spaniards arrived, their population, together with that of the Pipil and Poqomam, was 116,000 to 300,000 souls. Other estimates speak that the Lencas themselves numbered 300,000 (1520s) and about 25,000 in 1550.

The Lempira resistance and defense of 1537-1538 managed to arm more than 30,000 warriors, indicating a large population, but some mention that the population in 1537 was barely 15,000 and it dropped to 8,000 two years later due to diseases brought from the European continent. Mota led the Lenca war defence in the surrounding settlement of Gracias a Dios, in the current department of Lempira and the exterior Coco River in Miskito territories from the Spaniards; Entepica was chief of Piraera and lord of Cerquín.

=== Independence ===
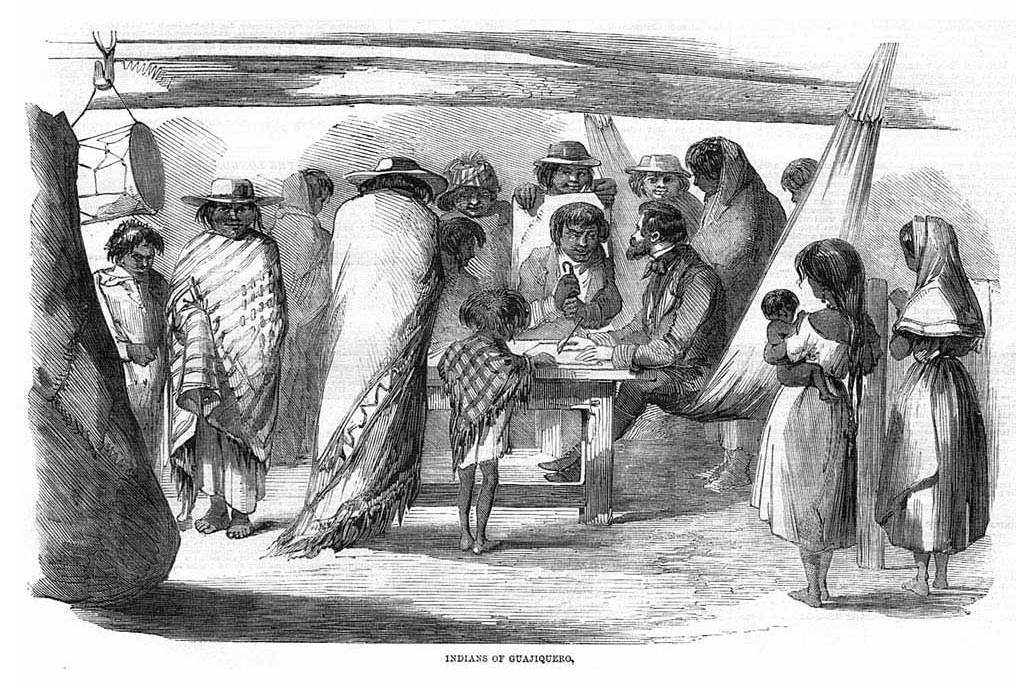
Lenca people in a 19th-century engraving, showing the condition in which they lived in at the time

After independence from Spain in 1821 and the formation of the Republic of Honduras, the formation of a new country was legalized through the constitution, of which tribal clans and ethnic groups were not part of the spoils of war or receiving total sovereignty back even though tribals participated as combatants.

=== 21st century ===
Lenca celebration in El Salvador

Despite the adoption of Catholicism, Spanish language, and the loss of their tribal language, the Lenca still preserve several features of their original culture today. In 1993, the tribal leader and Lenca activist Berta Cáceres co-founded the Civic Council of Popular and Indigenous Organizations of Honduras (COPINH). In 2015 she won the Goldman Environmental Prize and in March 2016 she was cruelly murdered, being honored both in her country and abroad thanks to her constant and long environmental struggle and for the rights of the tribal peoples of Honduras.

In March 2024, the United North American Council of the Lenka Nation was founded by several Lenca Clans living in diaspora across the United States of America and Canada, the creation of this council in diaspora was approved by the Lenca communities of Honduras and El Salvador

== Culture ==
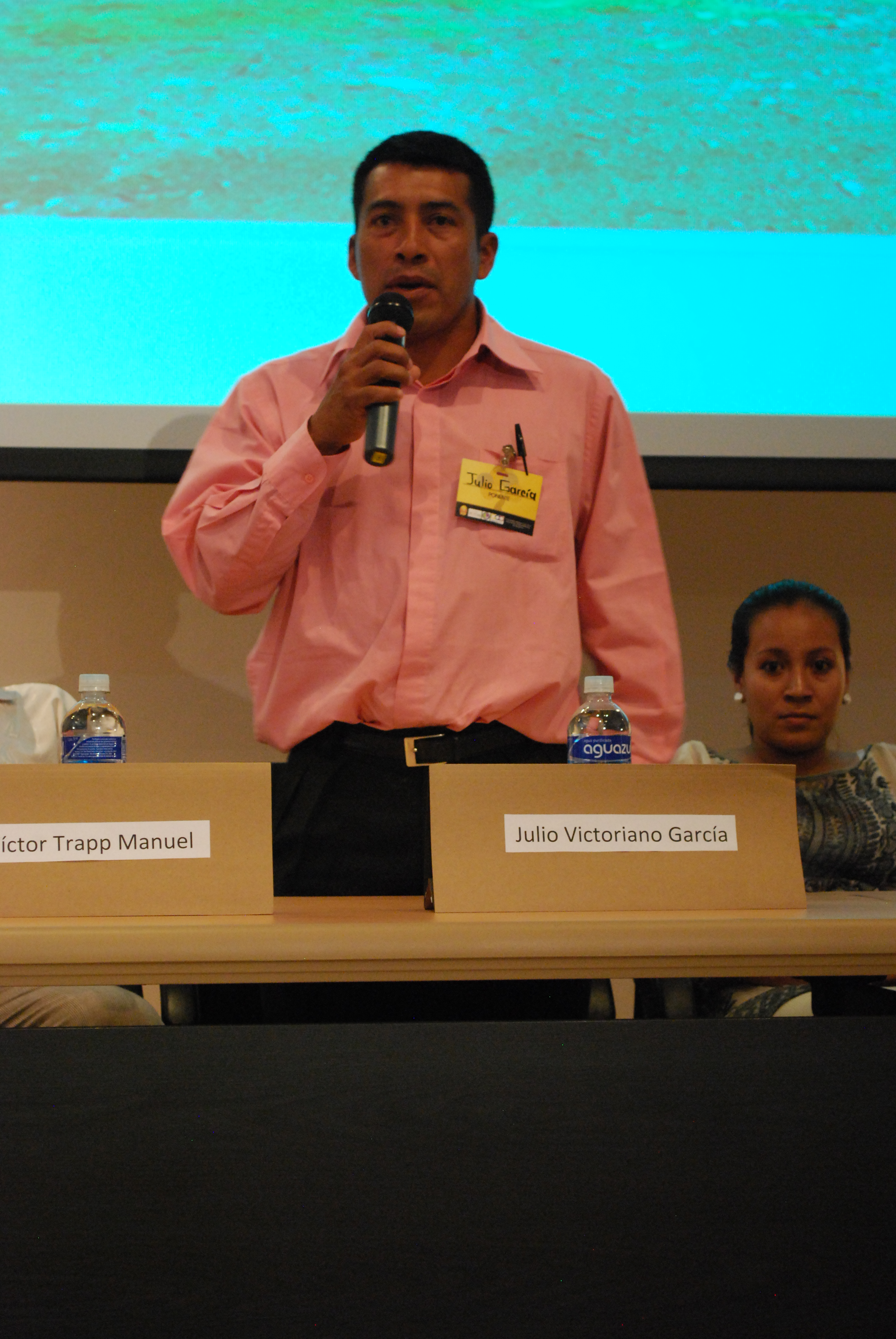
Julio Victoriano García representing the Lenca people at a Universidad Nacional Autónoma de Honduras conference

While there are ongoing political problems in contemporary Central America over tribal sovereignty, land rights and identity, the Lenca have retained many of their pre-European customs of usage of land by international laws. Although their tribal language is nearly extinct, and their culture has changed in other ways over the centuries due to the Spanish influence, the Lenca continue to preserve some customs and identify as tribal people. There are programs and dictionaries to help revitalize the Lenca language and culture. Aside from that, the Lenca still eat traditional foods such as Atol Shuko (a black corn paste that looks purple), Tamales Pisques, Miel de Jocote (jocote syrup), Miel De Mango (mango syrup), Panal De Abeja (bee hives), Cuzuco (armadillo), Garrobo (stone iguana), Chakalines (river shrimp), Punches (river crab) etc.

=== Economy ===
Modern Lenca communities are centered on the milpa crop-growing system. Lenca men engage in agriculture, including the cultivation of coffee, cacao, tobacco, varieties of plantains, and gourds. Other principal crops are maize, wheat, beans, squash, sugarcane, and chili peppers. In El Salvador peanuts are also cultivated. Within their communities, Lenca traditionally expect all members to participate in communal efforts.

While there has been a growing national acceptance of tribal rites and culture in both Honduras and El Salvador, the Lenca continue to struggle in both nations over tribal territorial sovereign rites of custom and usage of the land. In the mid-1990s, tribal leaders formed political groups in order to petition the government over issues of land ownership and tribal rites. Due to the unresolved land issues and constitutional amendments in those countries that favor land ownership by large-scale investors and agro-industrialists, there has been a decreasing amount of land for tribal people. Many Lenca men have had to find employment in neighboring cities.

Many Lenca communities still have their communal territory. They devote the majority of cultivation to commodity crops raised for export to foreign markets. Most Lenca still use traditional agricultural practices on their own crops, as well as the crops for investors.

=== Material culture ===
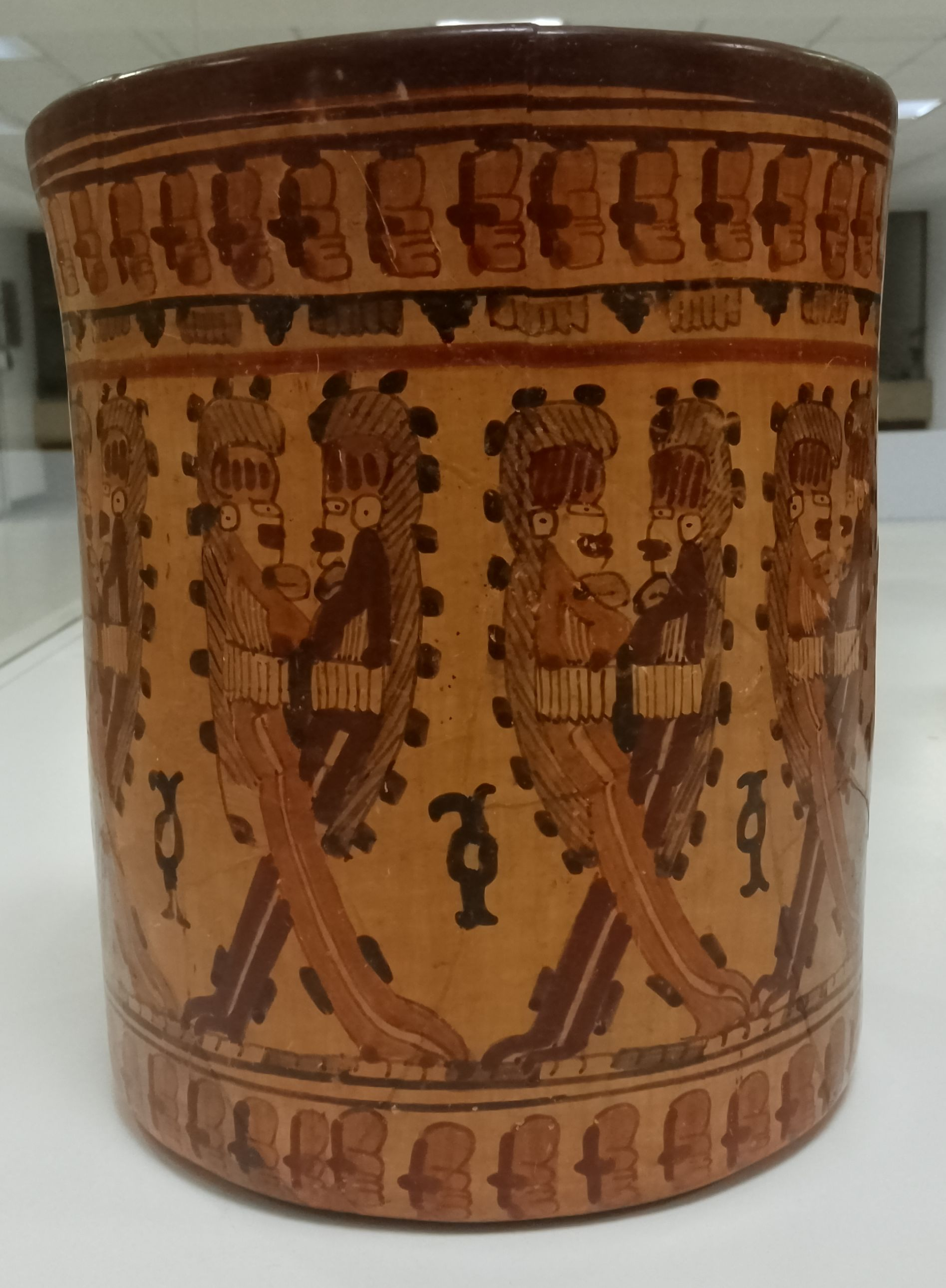
Ancient Lencan Vessel, dated to the classic period

During the Pre-European Era, Lencan pottery was very similar to that of other Mesoamerican groups, especially Mayan pottery and that of several groups from central Mexico. Today, Lencan pottery is very distinctive. Handcrafted by Lenca women, the modern custom pottery is considered an ethnic marking of their culture, as is common among custom Lenca people. Many handmade pieces are sold at very high prices in the United States and Europe.

In the mid-1980s, NGO cooperatives of women artisans were created in order to market their pottery. To increase sales of their works, the cooperatives were encouraged to orient their designs and styles to meet the tastes of urban buyers and to expand their market. In the 21st century, Lenca women are making modern painted pottery (often painted black and white) not based on traditional designs in an effort to appeal to foreign buyers.

Custom Lencan pottery is still made by women in the town of Gracias, Honduras and the surrounding villages, most notably in La Campa. The pieces are usually a dark orange or brick color. Visitors can watch demonstrations of how custom pottery is made.

=== Spirituality ===
The original religion of the Lencas showed certain parallels to other Mesoamerican religions, being polytheistic and featuring elements of nahualism and a strong connection to the environment.

The contemporary Lenca primarily practice Roman Catholicism, adopted, often by force, during the colonial Spanish era after the first war. As with other indigenous groups, their practices often incorporate pre-European custom, and some Lenca communities retain more exclusively indigenous customs. Some practices are associated with the cultivation and harvest of crops. During different crop seasons, for instance, Lenca men participate in ceremonies where they consume chicha and burn incense.

==== Guancasco ====
Guancasco is the annual ceremony by which neighboring communities, usually two, gather to establish reciprocal obligations in order to confirm peace and friendship. The guancascos take many forms and have adopted many Catholic representations, but they also include traditional customs and representations. Processions and elaborate exchanges of greetings and folk dancing are performed for the statue of the patron saint of the town. Towns in central and western Honduras such as Yamaranguila, La Campa, La Paz, etc., Or Eastern El Salvador south of Honduras like Lolotique, Yucuaiquin, Guatajiagua etc. all host the annual celebration.

== Archaeology ==
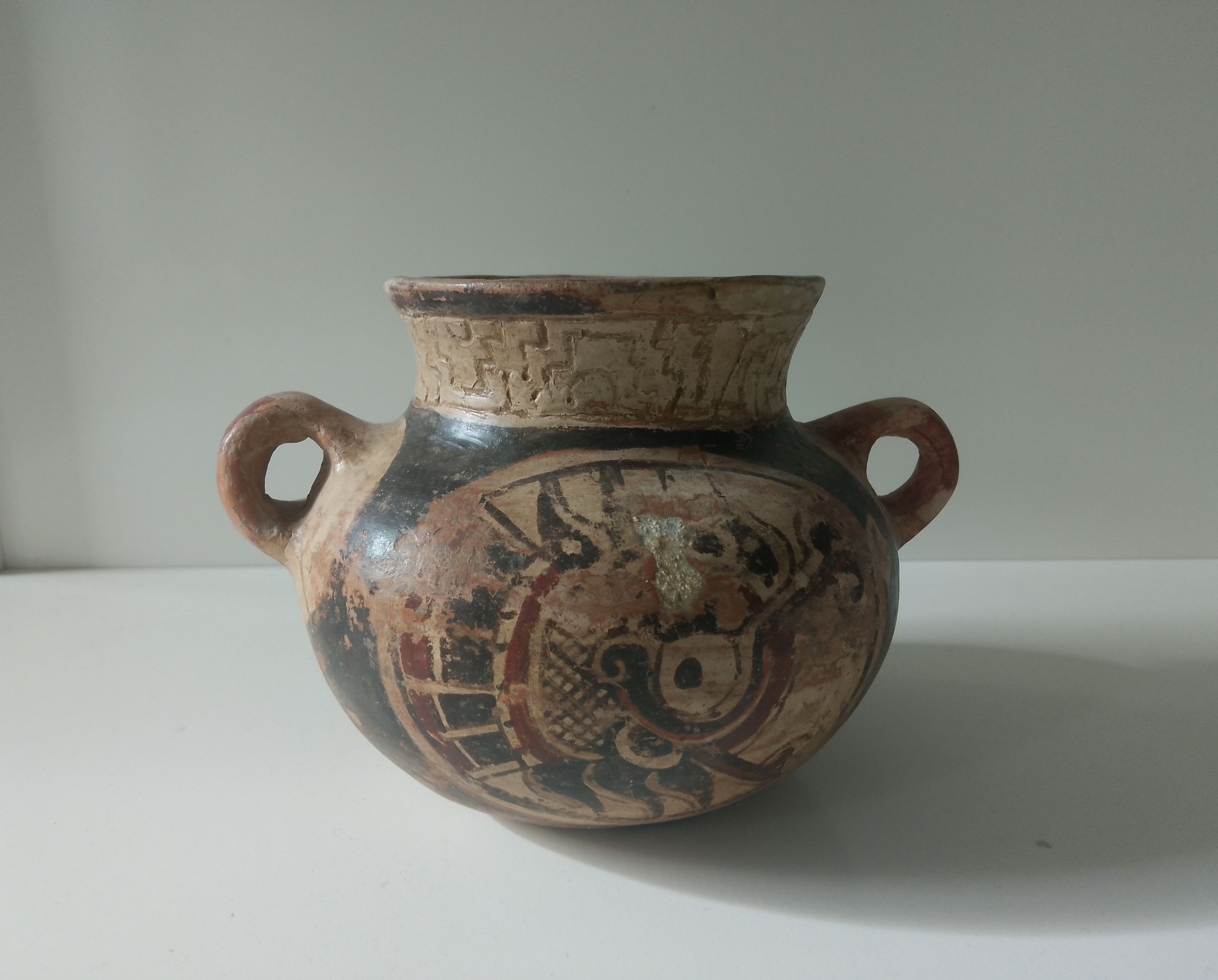
Vessel found at the Tenampua site.

Until recently, archaeological research and investigation of Lenca settlements had been limited. In studies of how the tribal and colonial cultures affected each other, more attention had been given to colonial-era settlements influenced by Europeans. In addition, many tribal sites are isolated and difficult to access. Researchers may also have difficulty conducting excavations because the sites are found in agricultural fields under cultivation. Surface evidence in rural areas reveals that pre-European tribal settlements existed in many regions. Many surface-visible earthwork mounds have been damaged from being plowed over by rural farmers.

The evidence for pre-European Lenca has come from research and excavation of several sites in Honduras and El Salvador. It shows that Lenca occupation was characterized by a relatively continuous pattern of growth.

The Comayagua Valley is located at the highland basin linking the Pacific and Caribbean drainage systems of Honduras. The valley provides evidence for a rich setting of cross-cultural relationships and Lenca settlements. According to Boyd Dixon, research in the area has revealed a complex history spanning approximately 2500 years from the early pre-classic period to the Spanish Conquest of 1537. Prehistoric Lenca settlements were typically located along major rivers to afford access to water for drinking and washing and to waterways for transportation. The lowlands were typically fertile areas. The Lenca built relatively few and small monumental public structures, except for military fortifications. Most constructions were made of adobe rather than stone.

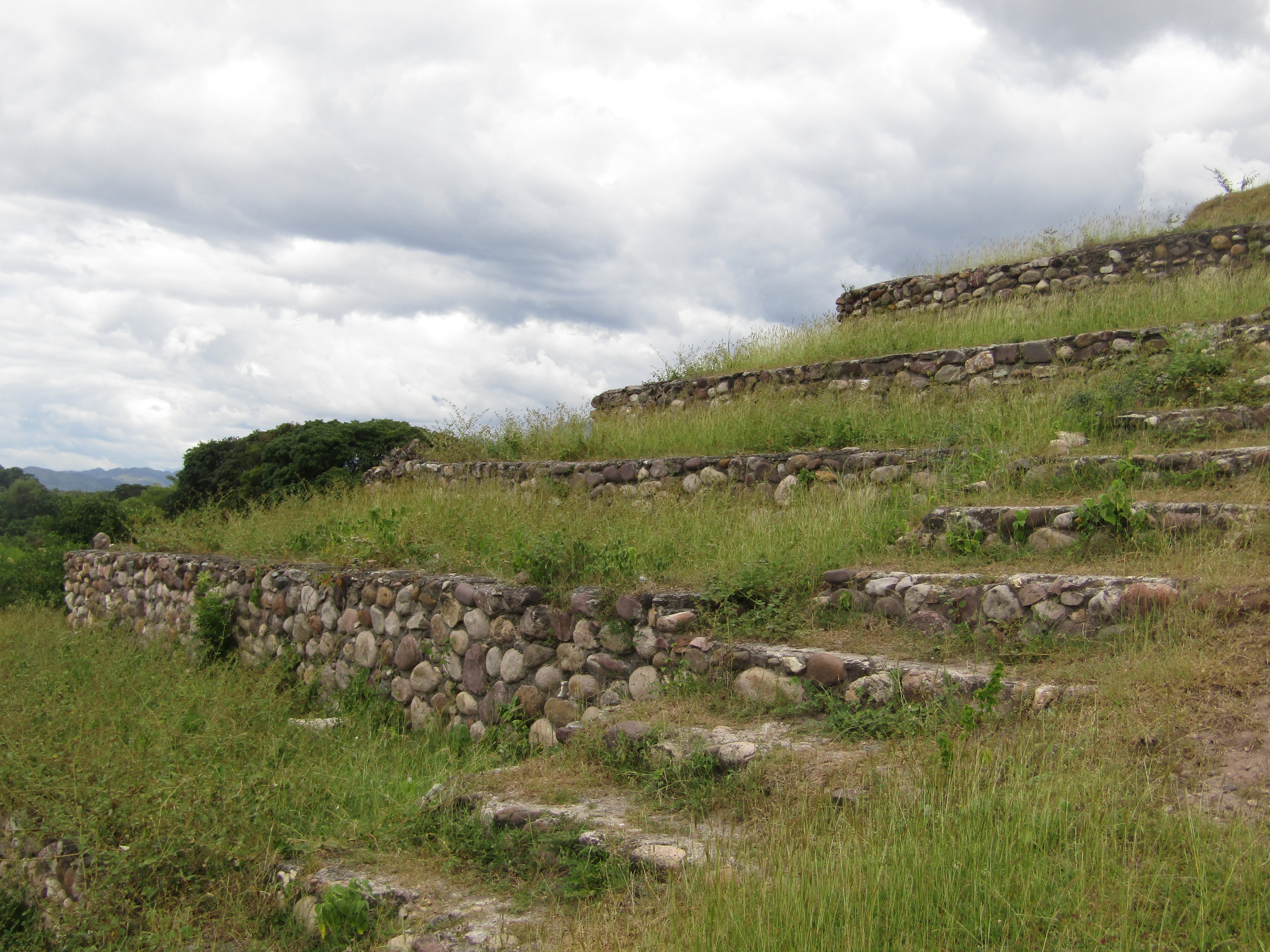
Structure 102 of Yarumela in Honduras.

In his research of the Comayagua Valley region, Dixon finds ample evidence of cross-cultural relationships; many artifacts have been found that show that settlements were linked through ceramics. The production of Usulua Polychrome ceramics has been shown to link Lenca settlements with neighboring chiefdoms during the classic period. The Lenca sites of Yarumela and Los Naranjos in Honduras, and Quelepa in El Salvador, all contain evidence of Usulután-style ceramics.

Yarumela is an archaeological site in the Comayagua Valley believed to be a primary Lenca center during the middle and late formative periods. The site contained a large primary residential center several times the size of that of its neighboring settlements which were secondary centers in the region. The site was most likely chosen because of its proximity to some of the major floodplains in the valley, whose fertile soil was cultivated for agriculture. The pattern and scale of the late pre-classic settlements suggest the existence of a ranked society. All corners of the basin were located within a half-day walk of Yarumela.

Other features found in the area are at the sites of Los Naranjos and Chalchuapa in El Salvador, each dominated by a single constructed earthen mound. Many other sites appear to share site-planning principles and structural forms with these examples, having large, open, flat plazas, leveled by manual grading, and dominated by a massive two- to three-tiered pyramidal earthwork mound.

Map of El Salvador's Indigenous Peoples at the time of the Spanish conquest: 1. Pipil people, 2. Lenca people, 3. Kakawira o Cacaopera, 4. Xinca, 5. Maya Ch'orti' people, 6. Maya Poqomam people, 7. Mangue o Chorotega.

Quelepa is a major site in eastern El Salvador. Its pottery shows strong similarities to ceramics found in central western El Salvador and the Maya highlands. Archaeologists speculate that Quelepa was settled by Lenca speakers from Honduras. Population pressure may have prompted their migrations to new territory. Another site is Tenampua, a city located in the valley of Comayagua of the Classic period, the city was protected by a series of walls still visible today. Various vases managed to be rescued from the site and taken to national museums.

Since the late 20th century, scholars have focused on researching and exploring settlement patterns of the Lenca in order to better understand the chronology of settlement during the pre-Columbian era.

== Tourism ==
Lenca heritage tourism is expanding. It has brought attention to indigenous Lenca traditions and culture, especially in Honduras. The Honduran Tourism Institute, along with the United Nations Development Program, has developed a cultural heritage project dedicated to the Lenca and their culture called La Ruta Lenca. This tourist route passes through a series of rural towns in southwestern Honduras within traditional Lenca territory. The route has designated stops in the departments of Intibuca, La Paz, Lempira, and adjacent valleys.

Stops include La Campa, where traditional Lenca pottery is handcrafted by a cooperative; the archaeological sites of Los Naranjos and Yarumela; the town of Gracias, and other towns with Lenca heritage. La Ruta Lenca was designed to attract tourism to Lenca communities and to encourage preservation of remaining indigenous cultural practices by increasing the economic return for artisans and providing new markets. The project has had some successes.

== Environmental activism ==
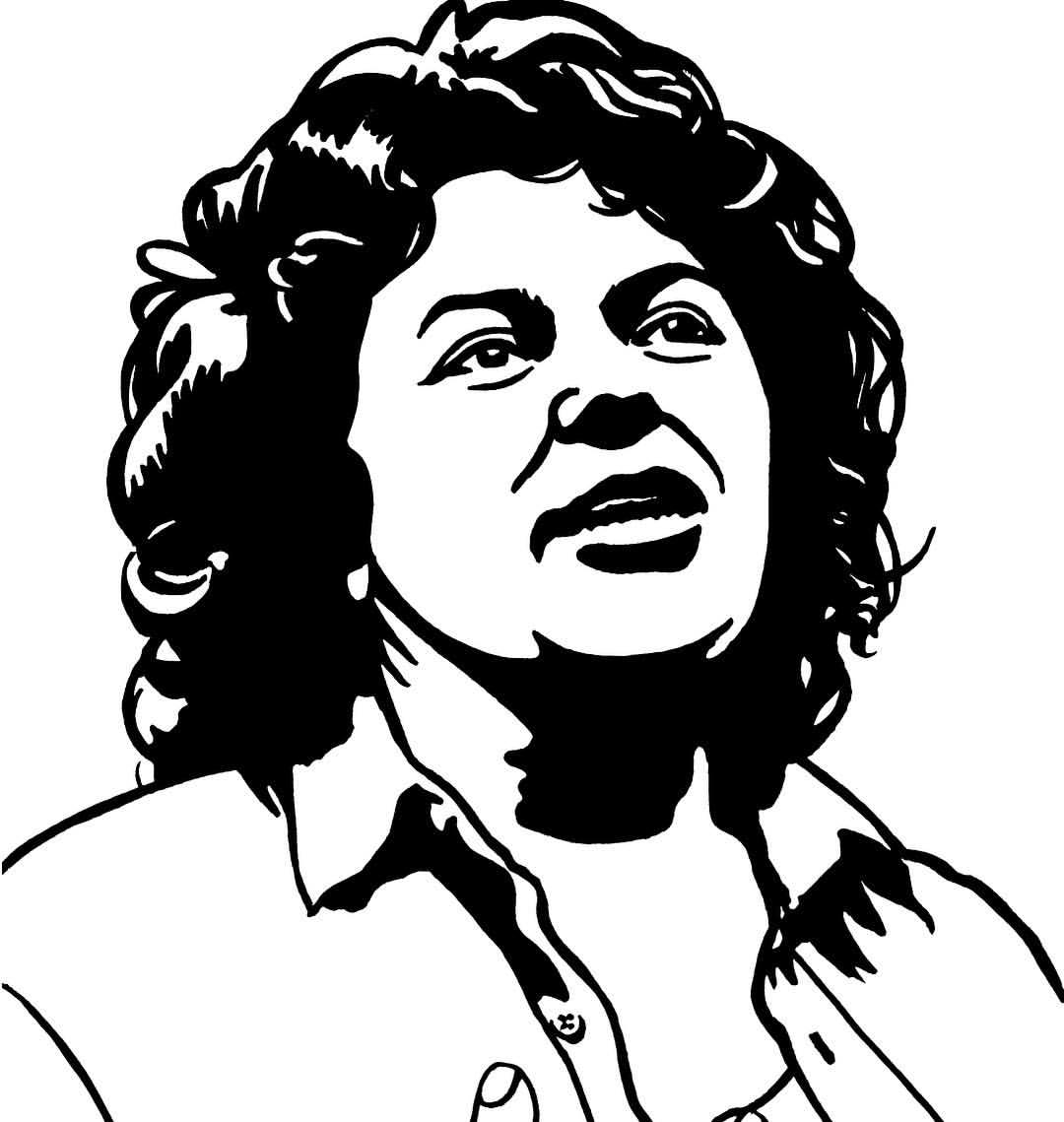
Berta Caceres, Honduran environmental activist.

Members of the Lenca community have taken larger national roles since the late 20th century, primarily in the areas of human and land rights for the indigenous peoples, which are seen as inextricably linked. They have also been active in a variety of environmental issues, particularly in trying to protect their territories against major development projects that would alter their lands and ecology. The risk of speaking out has been great; indigenous people opposing such major developments have been murdered.

Berta Cáceres was an important leader of the Lenca and founder of the Council of Popular and Indigenous Organizations of Honduras (COPINH). Cáceres strongly protested the development of the DESA Agua Zarca Hydro Project and dam on the Gualcarque River in Honduras. Cáceres won the 2015 Goldman Environmental Prize for her work with the Lenca and her leadership in environmental movements. She was discovered murdered at her home on 3 March 2016.

In a news report published on June 21, a former soldier of Honduras’ Inter-Institutional Security Force (known as Fusina) alleged that Cáceres’ name, along with the names of other environmentalists in Honduras, had appeared on a military hit list. A few weeks after her murder, major international investors—the Netherlands Development Finance Co. (FMO) and FinnFund—announced that they would suspend funding for the Agua Zarca project. On July 8, Secretary of Security Julian Pacheco said that the government had failed to provide adequate protection for Cáceres, who had received death threats previously.

Lesbia Yaneth was another Lenca activist who opposed the Aurora hydroelectric project which was planned in the municipality of San José, La Paz. This project was very important to the government; "the vice-president of the National Congress, Gladys Aurora Lopez," was reported as having "direct ties" to it. Yaneth's body was found on 7 July 2016; she had been murdered the previous day in the Matamulas sector of Marcala. Police initially claimed that Yaneth was killed during the robbery of her professional bike. Because she was active in COPINH, however, fellow members and supporters believe that she was assassinated because of her political work. United Nations and European Union officials protested her death. Three suspects were arrested within a week of the Yaneth murder.

== Notable Lencas ==
- Lempira
- Berta Cáceres
- Bertha Zúñiga
- Johnny Leverón
- America Ferrera
- Raffi Freedman-Gurspan

== See also ==
- Peñol de Cerquín

== Sources ==
- Adams, Richard. 1956. "Cultural Components of Central America." American Anthropologist, Vol 58(5), 881–907
- Black, Nancy. 1995. The Frontier Mission and Social Transformation in Western Honduras: The Order of Our Lady of Mercy, 1523–1773. E.J. Brill, Leiden. ISBN 90-04-10219-1
- Bosshard, Peter, 2016 "Who Killed Berta Cáceres?" "The Huffington Post", - 03/04/2016
- Brady, Scott. 2009. "Revisiting a Honduran Landscape Described by Robert West: An Experiment in Repeat Geography," Journal of Latin American Geography – Vol 8(1),7–27
- Carmack, Robert M. with Janine L. Gasco and Gary H. Gossen. (2007). The Legacy of Mesoamerica: History and Culture of a Native American Civilization – 2nd ed. New Jersey: Pearson Education, Inc.
- Chapman, Anne. 1985. Los Hijos del Copal y la Candela: Ritos agrarios y tradicion oral de los lencas de Honduras. Universidad Nacional Autonoma de Mexico, Mexico City.
- Dixon, Boyd. 1989. "A Preliminary Settlement Pattern Study of a Prehistoric Cultural Corridor: The Comayagua Valley, Honduras", Journal of Field Archaeology. Vol 16(30, 257–271, JSTOR 5297388
- Healy, P. 1984. "The Archaeology of Honduras", in The Archaeology of Lower Central America. Edited by F. Lange and D. Stone. Albuquerque: University of New Mexico Press, 113–161
- 2007. "Honduras and the Bay Islands", from Lonely Planet Publications Pty. Ltd.
- McFarlane, W. and Stockett, M. (2007). Archaeology and Community Development in the Jesus de Otoro Valley of Honduras. Paper presented at the 72nd Annual Meeting of the Society for American Archaeology, Austin, Texas, April 26
- Minority Rights Group International, World Directory of Minorities and indigenous Peoples – Honduras: Lenca, Miskitu, Tawahka, Pech, Chortia and Xicaque, 2008
- Minority Rights Group International, World Directory of Minorities and indigenous Peoples – El Salvador: indigenous peoples, 2008
- Nuwer, Rachel. 2016. "The Rising Murder Count of Environmental Activists" "New York Times", – 6/27/2016
- Sheets, P. 1984. "The Prehistory of El Salvador: An Interpretive Summary", in The Archaeology of Lower Central America. Edited by F. Lange and D. Stone. Albuquerque: University of New Mexico Press, 85–112
- Stone, Doris. 1963. "The Northern Highland Tribes: the Lenca", in Handbook of South American Indians. Vol. 4: the Circum-Caribbean Tribes, 205–217
- https://www.brisbanetimes.com.au/lifestyle/a-princely-story-20080922-geadd1.html
