= Environmental issues =

Concerns and policies regarding the biophysical environment

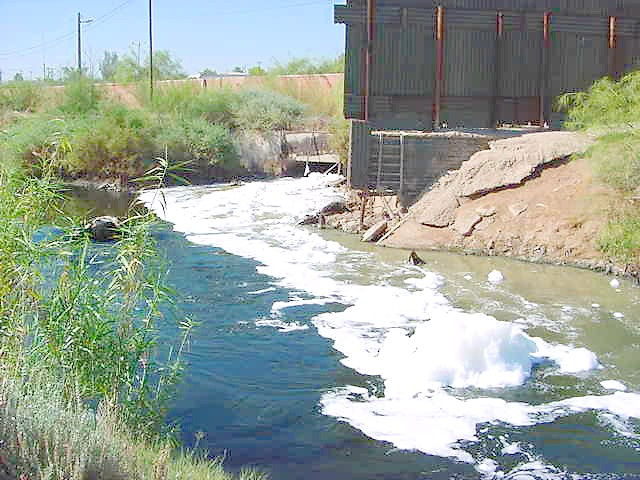
Water pollution is an environmental issue that affects many water bodies. This photograph shows foam on the New River as it enters the United States from Mexico.

Environmental issues are disruptions in the usual function of ecosystems. Further, these issues can be caused by humans (human impact on the environment) or they can be natural. These issues are considered serious when the ecosystem cannot recover in the present situation, and catastrophic if the ecosystem is projected to certainly collapse.

Environmental protection is the practice of protecting the natural environment on the individual, organizational or governmental levels, for the benefit of both the environment and humans. Environmentalism is a social and environmental movement that addresses environmental issues through advocacy, legislation education, and activism.

Environment destruction caused by humans is a global, ongoing problem. Water pollution also cause problems to marine life. Some scholars believe that the projected peak global population of roughly 9–10 billion people could live sustainably within the earth's ecosystems if humans worked to live sustainably within planetary boundaries. The bulk of environmental impacts are caused by excessive consumption of industrial goods by the world's wealthiest populations. The UN Environmental Program, in its "Making Peace With Nature" Report in 2021, found addressing key planetary crises, like pollution, climate change and biodiversity loss, was achievable if parties work to address the Sustainable Development Goals.

In response to the unprecedented challenges of climate change, global warming, and environmental degradation, governments and institutions across the world are searching for ways to reduce carbon emissions from the energy, industrial, transportation sectors and the global food system.

Over the past few decades, global meat production and consumption have increased drastically. To meet this growing demand, livestock farming and the meat industry have expanded at an unprecedented scale, resulting in deforestation, excessive water consumption, land degradation, air and water pollution, and significant greenhouse gas emissions. Scientific studies identify the livestock sector as a major contributor to global greenhouse gas emissions. Roughly half of all agricultural greenhouse gas emissions are produced by ruminant live stock. In particular, methane and nitrous oxide, released in large quantities through livestock production, possess a much higher global warming potential than carbon dioxide.

== Types ==
Major current environmental issues may include climate change, pollution, environmental degradation, resource depletion, and genetically modified foods. The conservation movement lobbies for protection of endangered species and protection of ecologically valuable natural areas. The UN has adopted international frameworks for environmental issues in three key areas, which has been encoded as the "triple planetary crisis": climate change, pollution, and biodiversity loss.

== Human impact ==
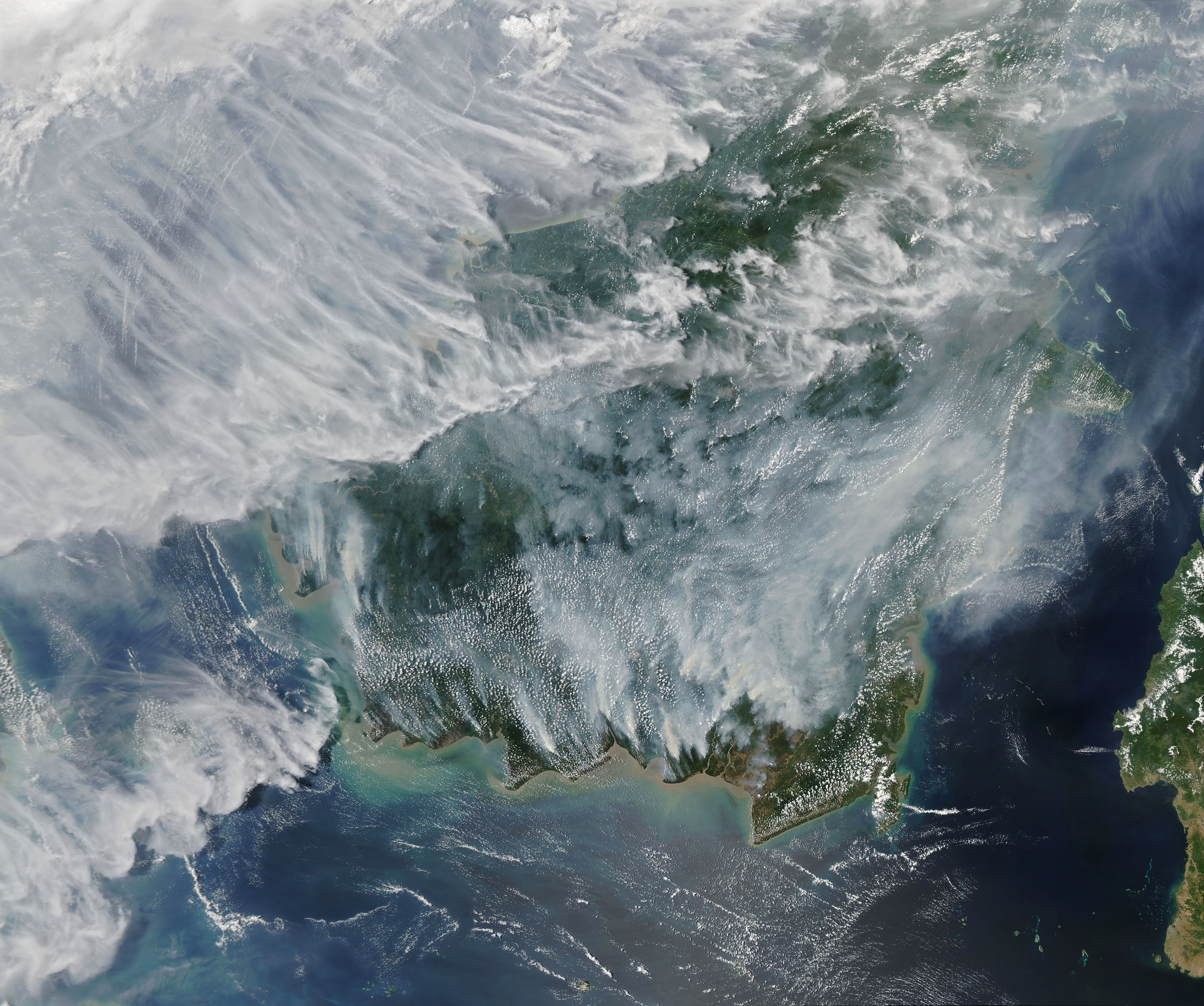
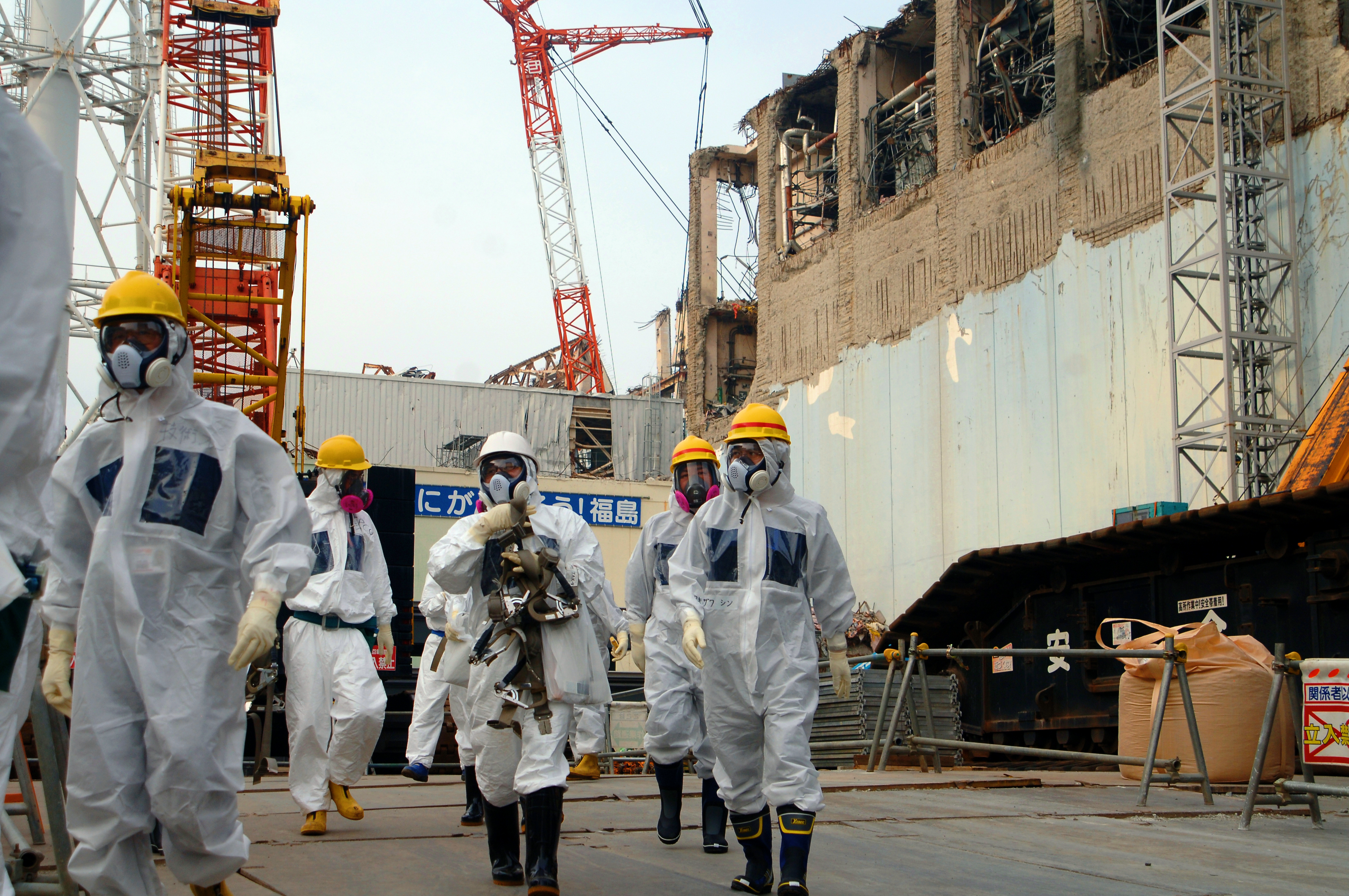
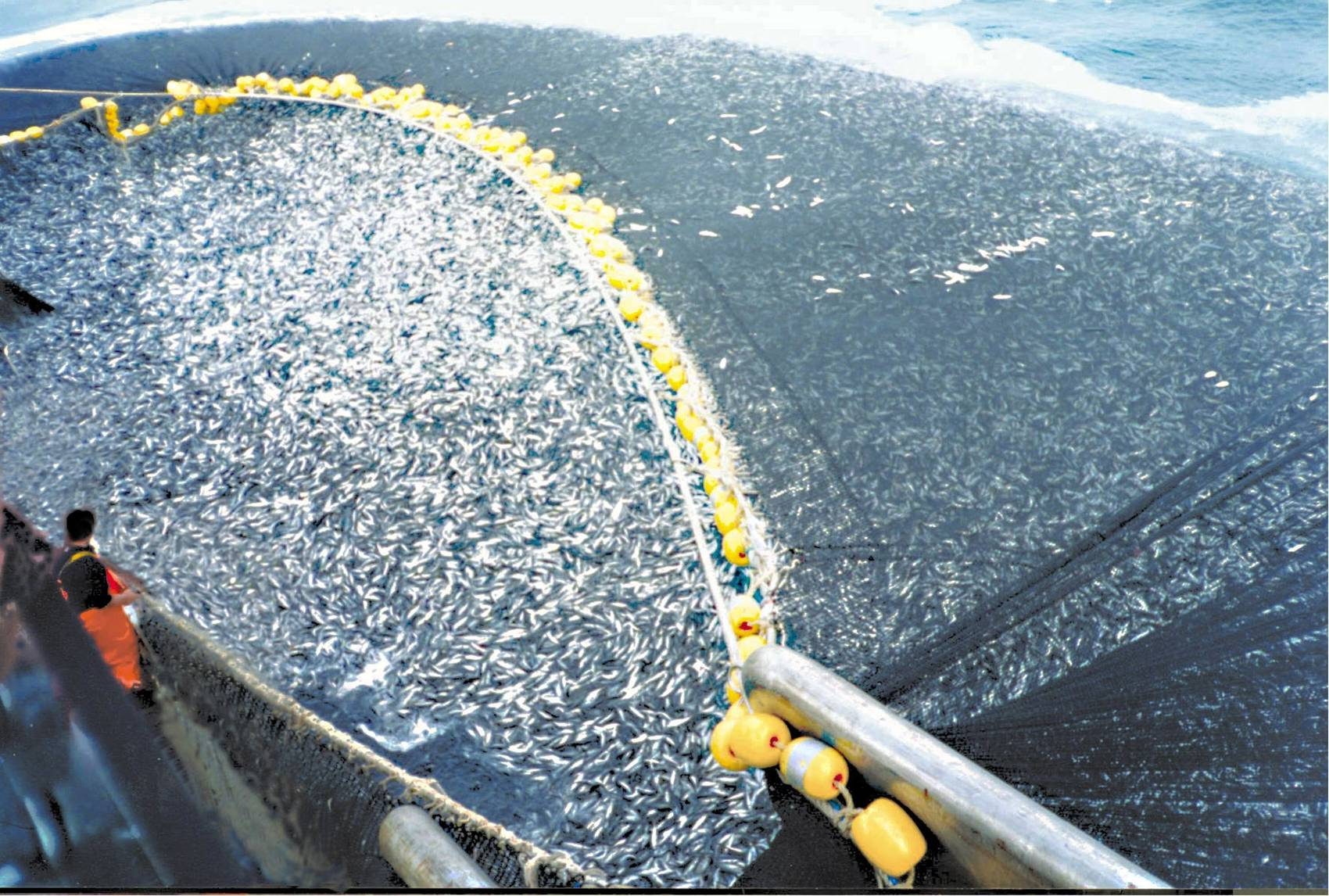
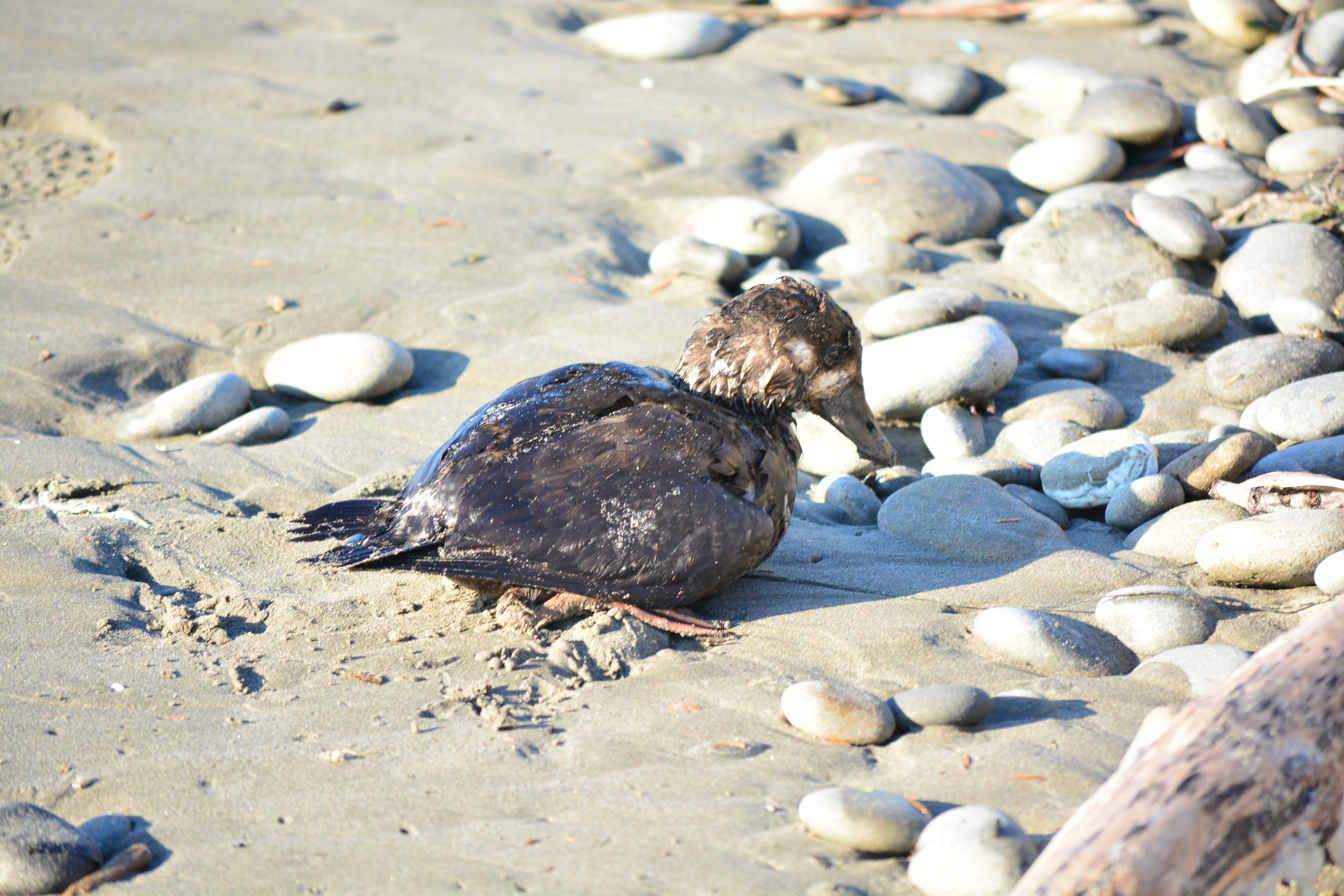
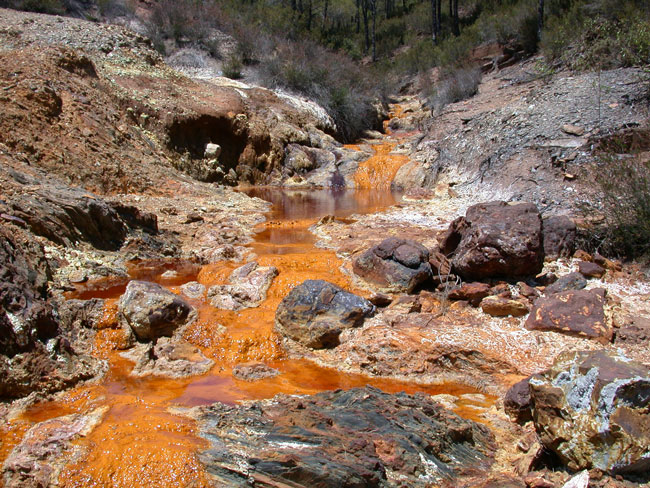
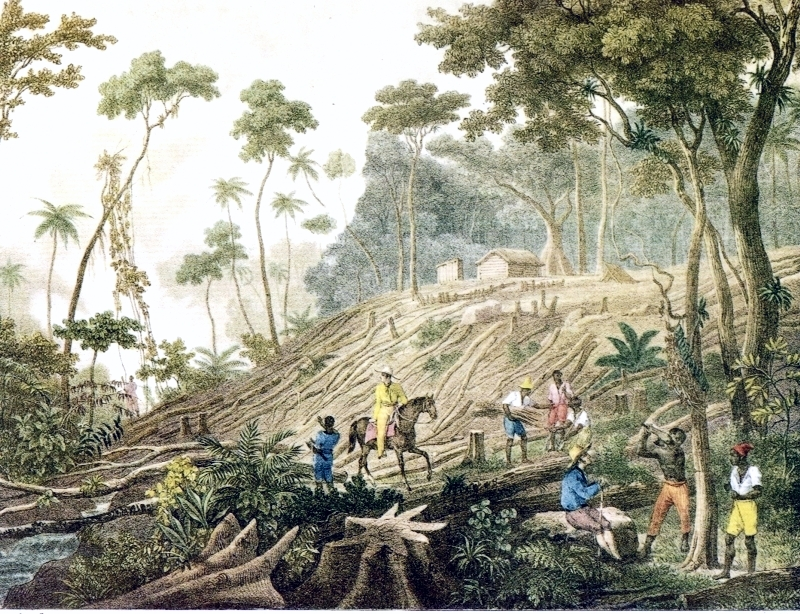
Human impact on the environment. From top left, clockwise: satellite image of Southeast Asian haze; IAEA experts investigate the Fukushima disaster;. a seabird during an oil spill; slaves clearing the Brazil's Atlantic forest on behalf of the Portuguese settlers, c. 1820–1825; acid mine drainage in the Rio Tinto; industrial fishing in 1997, a practice that has led to overfishing.

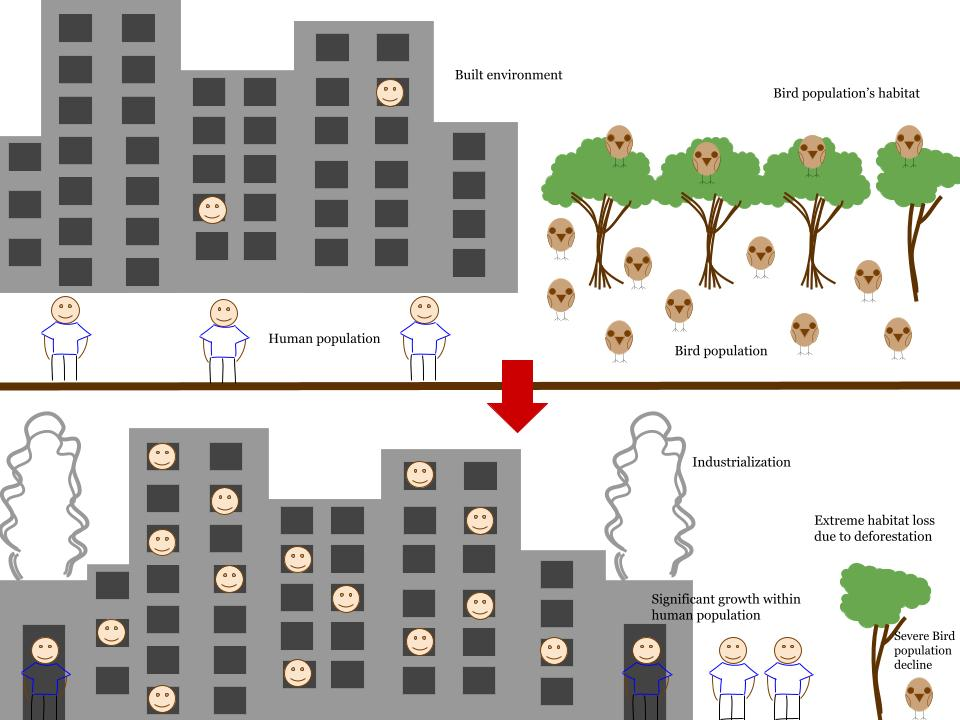
The impact of human expansion on ecosystems, highlighting how industrialization and deforestation for urban development lead to significant habitat loss and a severe decline in bird populations.

Human impact on the environment (or anthropogenic environmental impact) refers to changes to biophysical environments and to ecosystems, biodiversity, and natural resources caused directly or indirectly by humans. Modifying the environment to fit the needs of society (as in the built environment) is causing severe effects including global warming, environmental degradation (such as ocean acidification), mass extinction, and biodiversity loss, ecological crisis, and ecological collapse. Some human activities that cause damage (either directly or indirectly) to the environment on a global scale include population growth, neoliberal economic policies, and rapid economic growth. Overconsumption, overexploitation, pollution, and deforestation are also contributing to this problem. Some of the problems, including global warming and biodiversity loss, have been proposed as representing catastrophic risks to the survival of the human species.

The term anthropogenic designates an effect or object resulting from human activity. The term was first used in the technical sense by Russian geologist Alexey Pavlov, and it was first used in English by British ecologist Arthur Tansley in reference to human influences on climax plant communities. The atmospheric scientist Paul Crutzen introduced the term "Anthropocene" in the mid-1970s. The term is sometimes used in the context of pollution produced from human activity since the start of the Agricultural Revolution but also applies broadly to all major human impacts on the environment. Many of the actions taken by humans that contribute to a heated environment stem from the burning of fossil fuel from a variety of sources, such as electricity, cars, planes, space heating, manufacturing, or the destruction of forests.

=== Pollution ===
Pollution is the introduction of contaminants into the natural environment that cause harm. Pollution can take the form of any substance (solid, liquid, or gas) or energy (such as radioactivity, heat, sound, or light). Pollutants, the components of pollution, can be either foreign substances/energies or naturally occurring contaminants.

Although environmental pollution can be caused by natural events, the word pollution generally implies that the contaminants have a human source, such as manufacturing, extractive industries, poor waste management, transportation or agriculture. Pollution is often classed as point source (coming from a highly concentrated specific site, such as a factory, mine, construction site), or nonpoint source pollution (coming from widespread distributed sources, such as microplastics or agricultural runoff).

Many sources of pollution were unregulated parts of industrialization during the 19th and 20th centuries until the emergence of environmental regulation and pollution policy in the later half of the 20th century. Sites where historically polluting industries released persistent pollutants may have legacy pollution long after the source of the pollution is stopped. Major forms of pollution include air pollution, water pollution, litter, noise pollution, plastic pollution, soil contamination, radioactive contamination, thermal pollution, light pollution, and visual pollution.

Pollution has widespread consequences on human and environmental health, having systematic impact on social and economic systems. In 2019, pollution killed approximately nine million people worldwide (about one in six deaths that year); about three-quarters of these deaths were caused by air pollution. A 2022 literature review found that levels of anthropogenic chemical pollution have exceeded planetary boundaries and now threaten entire ecosystems around the world. Pollutants frequently have outsized impacts on vulnerable populations, such as children and the elderly, and marginalized communities, because polluting industries and toxic waste sites tend to be collocated with populations with less economic and political power. This outsized impact is a core reason for the formation of the environmental justice movement, and continues to be a core element of environmental conflicts, particularly in the Global South.

Because of the impacts of these chemicals, local, country-level, and international policy have increasingly sought to regulate pollutants, resulting in increasing air and water quality standards, alongside regulation of specific waste streams. Regional and national policy is typically supervised by environmental agencies or ministries, while international efforts are coordinated by the UN Environmental Program and other treaty bodies. Pollution mitigation is an important part of all of the Sustainable Development Goals.

=== Degradation ===
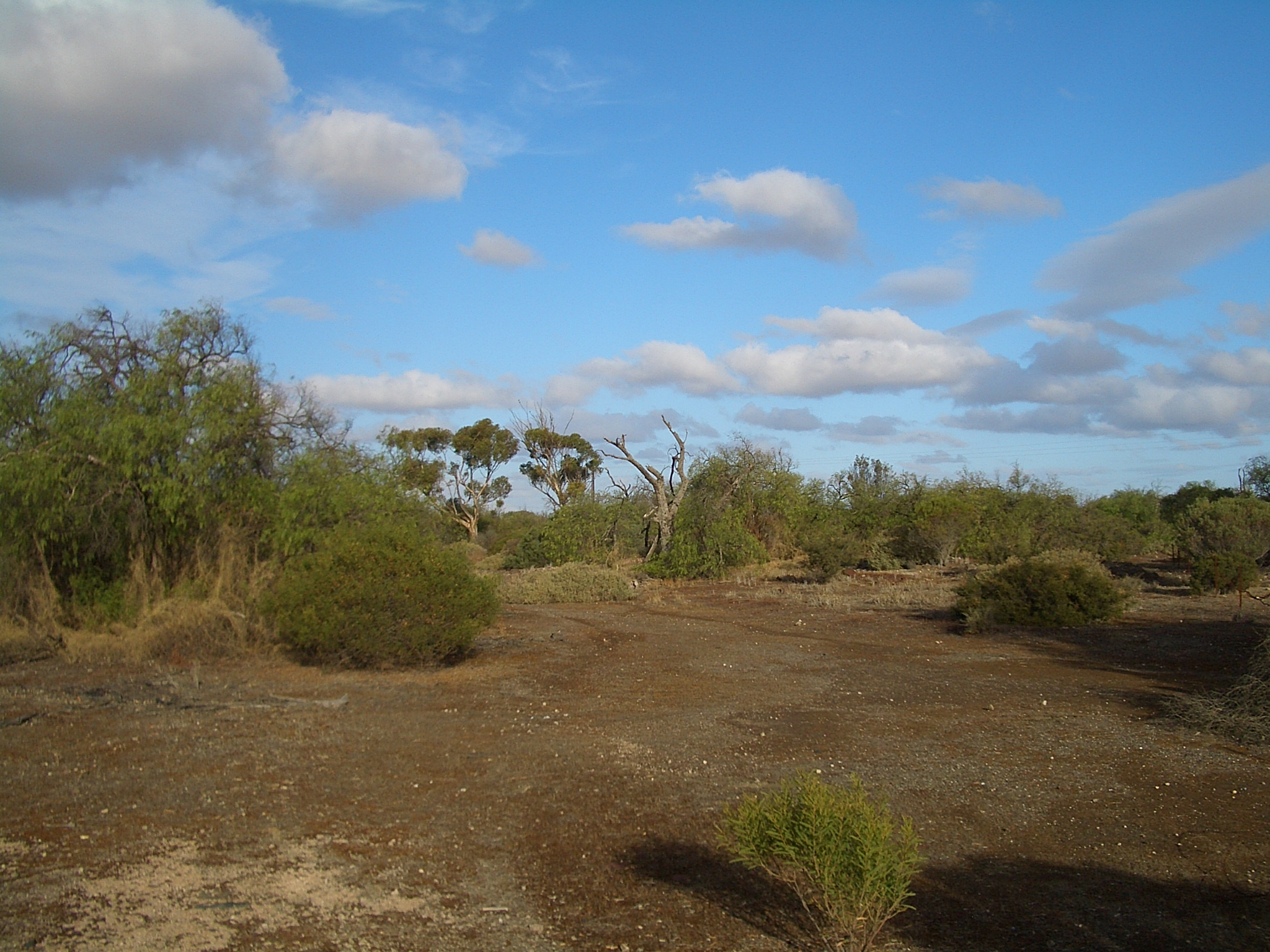
More than eighty years after the abandonment of Wallaroo Mines (Kadina, South Australia), mosses remain the only vegetation in some areas of the site's grounds.

Environmental degradation is the deterioration of the environment through depletion of resources such as quality of air, water and soil; the destruction of ecosystems; habitat destruction; the extinction of wildlife; and pollution. It is defined as any change or disturbance to the environment perceived to be deleterious or undesirable. The environmental degradation process amplifies the impact of environmental issues which leave lasting impacts on the environment.

Environmental degradation is one of the ten threats officially cautioned by the High-level Panel on Threats, Challenges and Change of the United Nations. The United Nations International Strategy for Disaster Reduction defines environmental degradation as "the reduction of the capacity of the environment to meet social and ecological objectives, and needs".

Environmental degradation comes in many types. When natural habitats are destroyed or natural resources are depleted, the environment is degraded; direct environmental degradation, such as deforestation, which is readily visible; this can be caused by more indirect process, such as the build up of plastic pollution over time or the buildup of greenhouse gases that causes tipping points in the climate system. Efforts to counteract this problem include environmental protection and environmental resources management. Mismanagement that leads to degradation can also lead to environmental conflict where communities organize in opposition to the forces that mismanaged the environment.

=== Conflict ===
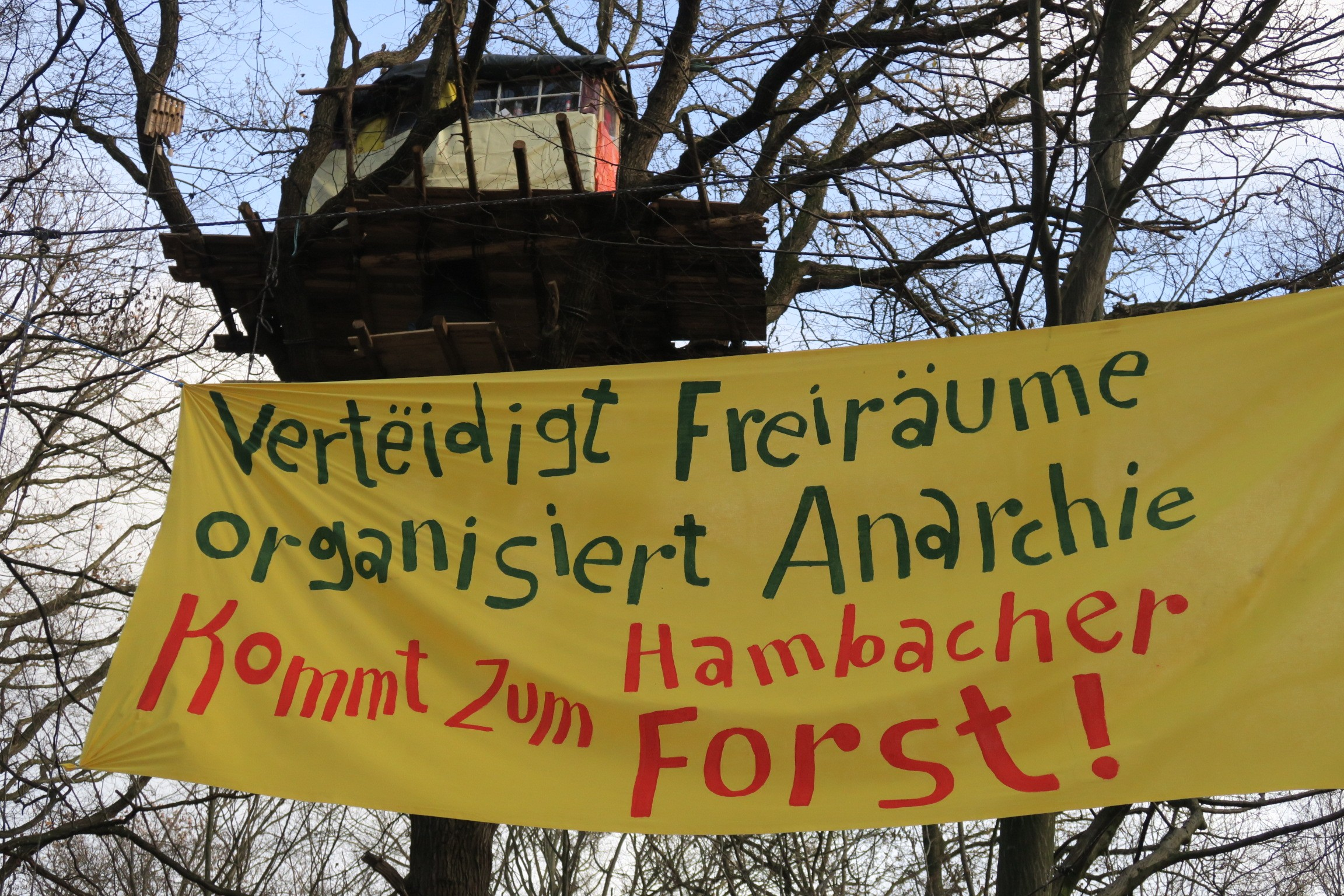
Hambach Forest protest against coal mine expansion

Environmental conflicts, socio-environmental conflict or ecological distribution conflicts (EDCs) are social conflicts caused by environmental degradation or by unequal distribution of environmental resources. The Environmental Justice Atlas documented 3,100 environmental conflicts worldwide as of April 2020 and emphasised that many more conflicts remained undocumented.

Parties involved in these conflicts include locally affected communities, states, companies and investors, and social or environmental movements; typically environmental defenders are protecting their homelands from resource extraction or hazardous waste disposal. Resource extraction and hazardous waste activities often create resource scarcities (such as by overfishing or deforestation), pollute the environment, and degrade the living space for humans and nature, resulting in conflict. A particular case of environmental conflicts are forestry conflicts, or forest conflicts which "are broadly viewed as struggles of varying intensity between interest groups, over values and issues related to forest policy and the use of forest resources". In the last decades, a growing number of these have been identified globally.

Frequently environmental conflicts focus on environmental justice issues, the rights of indigenous people, the rights of peasants, or threats to communities whose livelihoods are dependent on the ocean. Outcomes of local conflicts are increasingly influenced by trans-national environmental justice networks that comprise the global environmental justice movement.

Environmental conflict can complicate response to natural disaster or exacerbate existing conflicts – especially in the context of geopolitical disputes or where communities have been displaced to create environmental migrants. The study of these conflicts is related to the fields of ecological economics, political ecology, and environmental justice.

== Costs ==
Environmental issues impose a heavy and wide-ranging economic burden affecting public health, infrastructure, productivity, ecosystems, and long-term economic growth.

- Health and public-health costs: In the United States alone, the annual health costs from air pollution and climate change, including increased illness, hospitalizations, lost wages, and premature deaths — have been estimated to exceed US$820 billion per year.
- Global economic losses from climate change and extreme weather: Worldwide, climate change–related damage to infrastructure, property, agriculture, and human health is projected to cost between US$1.7 and US$3.1 trillion per year by 2050. World Economic Forum Across the period 2000–2019, extreme weather events alone caused roughly US$2.8 trillion in cumulative losses.
- Costs of environmental externalities and nature-decline: Sectors that drive biodiversity loss, such as agriculture, fossil-fuels, forestry, infrastructure, fisheries, and mining, generate substantial environmental externalities. Recent estimates put the global cost of these negative externalities at US$10.5 to US$ 22.6 trillion annually.
- Lost economic potential and productivity: Declines in ecosystem services, biodiversity, and natural capital can undermine long-term economic stability. For example, widespread deforestation, land degradation, and ecosystem collapse erode resources for agriculture, fisheries, water supply, and climate regulation, thereby threatening livelihoods and economic resilience.

== Action ==
=== Justice ===
Environmental justice is a social movement that addresses perceived injustice which are alleged to occur when poor or marginalized communities are harmed by hazardous waste, resource extraction, and other land uses from which they do not benefit. The movement has generated hundreds of studies which contend exposure to environmental harm is inequitably distributed. Additionally, it is argued many marginalized communities, including Black/racialized communities and the LGBTQ community, are disproportionately impacted by natural disasters.

Environmental justice is broadly defined by proponents as fair treatment and meaningful involvement of all people regardless of race, color, national origin, or income with respect to the development, implementation, and enforcement of environmental laws, regulations, and policies. Over time, scholars have elaborated multiple dimensions of the concept.

The movement began in the United States in the 1980s. It was heavily influenced by the American civil rights movement and focused on environmental racism within rich countries. The movement was later expanded to consider gender, LGBTQ people, international environmental injustice, and inequalities within marginalized groups. As the movement achieved some success in more developed countries, it was argued environmental burdens were shifted to the Global South (for example through extractivism or the global waste trade). The movement for environmental justice has thus become more global, with some of its aims now being articulated by the United Nations. The movement overlaps with movements for Indigenous land rights and for the human right to a healthy environment.

The goal of the environmental justice movement is to achieve what proponents believe is agency for marginalized communities in making environmental decisions that affect their lives. The global environmental justice movement arises from local environmental conflicts in which environmental defenders frequently confront multi-national corporations in resource extraction or other industries. Local outcomes of these conflicts are increasingly influenced by trans-national environmental justice networks.

Environmental justice scholars have produced an interdisciplinary body of social science literature that includes contributions to political ecology, environmental law, and theories on justice and sustainability.

The 2023 IPCC report highlighted the disproportionate effects of climate change on vulnerable populations. The report's findings make it clear that every increment of global warming exacerbates challenges such as extreme heatwaves, heavy rainfall, and other weather extremes, which in turn amplify risks for human health and ecosystems. With nearly half of the world's population residing in regions highly susceptible to climate change, the urgency for global actions that are both rapid and sustained is underscored. The importance of integrating diverse knowledge systems, including scientific, Indigenous, and local knowledge, into climate action is highlighted as a means to foster inclusive solutions that address the complexities of climate impacts across different communities.

In addition, the report points out the critical gap in adaptation finance, noting that developing countries require significantly more resources to effectively adapt to climate challenges than what is currently available. This financial disparity raises questions about the global commitment to equitable climate action and underscores the need for a substantial increase in support and resources. The IPCC's analysis suggests that with adequate financial investment and international cooperation, it is possible to embark on a pathway towards resilience and sustainability that benefits all sections of society.

=== Law ===
Environmental laws are laws that protect the environment. The term "environmental law" encompasses treaties, statutes, regulations, conventions, and policies designed to protect the natural environment and manage the impact of human activities on ecosystems and natural resources, such as forests, minerals, or fisheries. It addresses issues such as pollution control, resource conservation, biodiversity protection, climate change mitigation, and sustainable development. As part of both national and international legal frameworks, environmental law seeks to balance environmental preservation with economic and social needs, often through regulatory mechanisms, enforcement measures, and incentives for compliance.

The field emerged prominently in the mid-20th century as industrialization and environmental degradation spurred global awareness, culminating in landmark agreements like the 1972 Stockholm Conference and the 1992 Rio Declaration. Key principles include the precautionary principle, the polluter pays principle, and intergenerational equity. Modern environmental law intersects with human rights, international trade, and energy policy.

Internationally, treaties such as the Paris Agreement (2015), the Kyoto Protocol (1997), and the Convention on Biological Diversity (1992) establish cooperative frameworks for addressing transboundary issues. Nationally, laws like the UK's Clean Air Act 1956 and the US Toxic Substances Control Act of 1976 establish regulations to limit pollution and manage chemical safety. Enforcement varies by jurisdiction, often involving governmental agencies, judicial systems, and international organizations. Environmental impact assessments are a common way to enforce environmental law.

Challenges in environmental law include reconciling economic growth with sustainability, determining adequate levels of compensation, and addressing enforcement gaps in international contexts. The field continues to evolve in response to emerging crises such as biodiversity loss, plastic pollution in oceans, and climate change.

=== Assessment ===
Environmental impact assessment (EIA) is the assessment of the environmental consequences of a plan, policy, program, or actual projects prior to the decision to move forward with the proposed action. In this context, the term "environmental impact assessment" is usually used when applied to actual projects by individuals or companies and the term "strategic environmental assessment" (SEA) applies to policies, plans and programmes most often proposed by organs of state. It is a tool of environmental management forming a part of project approval and decision-making. Environmental assessments may be governed by rules of administrative procedure regarding public participation and documentation of decision making, and may be subject to judicial review.

The purpose of the assessment is to ensure that decision-makers consider the environmental impacts when deciding whether or not to proceed with a project. The International Association for Impact Assessment (IAIA) defines an environmental impact assessment as "the process of identifying, predicting, evaluating and mitigating the biophysical, social, and other relevant effects of development proposals prior to major decisions being taken and commitments made". EIAs are unique in that they do not require adherence to a predetermined environmental outcome, but rather they require decision-makers to account for environmental values in their decisions and to justify those decisions in light of detailed environmental studies and public comments on the potential environmental impacts.

=== Movement ===
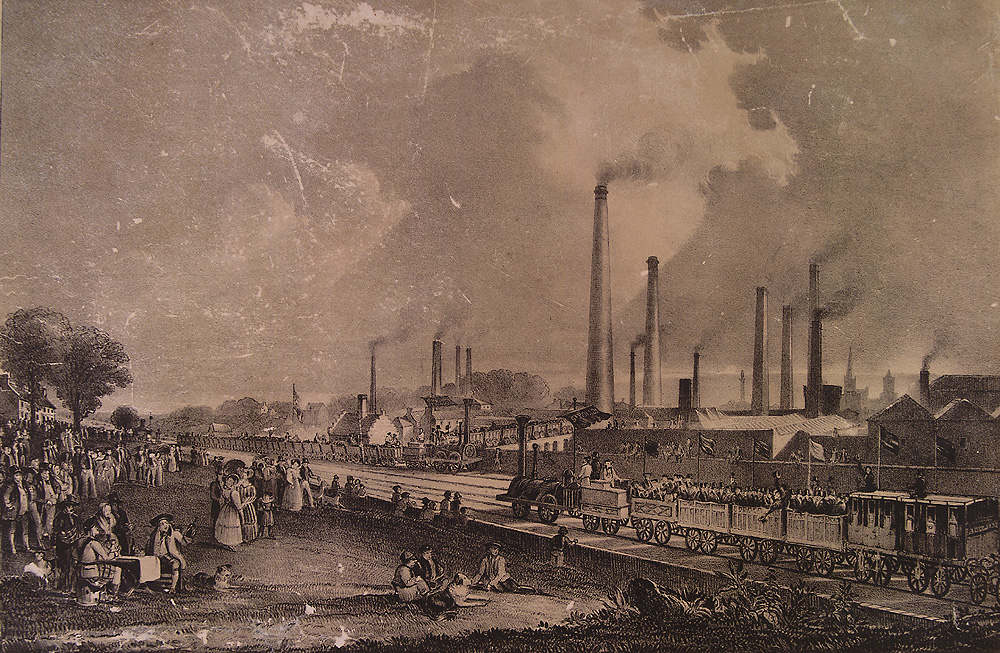
Levels of air pollution rose during the Industrial Revolution, sparking the first modern environmental laws to be passed in the mid-19th century.

The environmental movement, sometimes referred to as the ecology movement, is a social movement that aims to protect the natural world from harmful environmental practices in order to create sustainable living. In its recognition of humanity as a participant in (not an enemy of) ecosystems, the movement is centered on ecology, health, as well as human rights.

The environmental movement is an international movement, represented by a range of environmental organizations, from enterprises to grassroots and varies from country to country. Due to its large membership, varying and strong beliefs, and occasionally speculative nature, the environmental movement is not always united in its goals. At its broadest, the movement includes private citizens, professionals, religious devotees, politicians, scientists, nonprofit organizations, and individual advocates like former Wisconsin Senator Gaylord Nelson and Rachel Carson in the 20th century.

Since the 1970s, public awareness, environmental sciences, ecology, and technology have advanced to include modern focus points like ozone depletion, climate change, acid rain, mutation breeding, genetically modified crops and genetically modified livestock. The climate movement can be regarded as a sub-type of the environmental movement.

=== Organizations ===
Environmental issues are addressed at a regional, national or international level by government organizations.

The largest international agency, set up in 1972, is the United Nations Environment Programme. The International Union for Conservation of Nature brings together 83 states, 108 government agencies, 766 Non-governmental organizations and 81 international organizations and about 10,000 experts, scientists from countries around the world. International non-governmental organizations include Greenpeace, Friends of the Earth and World Wide Fund for Nature. Governments enact environmental policy and enforce environmental law and this is done to differing degrees around the world.

== Film and television ==
There are an increasing number of films being produced on environmental issues, especially on climate change and global warming. Al Gore's 2006 film An Inconvenient Truth gained commercial success and a high media profile.

== See also ==
- Citizen science
- Ecotax
- Environmental impact statement
- Environmentalism
- Green politics
- Index of environmental articles
- Nature-based solutions
- Triple planetary crisis

Issues

- List of environmental issues (includes mitigation and conservation)

Specific issues

- Air pollution
- Environmental impact of agriculture
- Environmental impact of aviation
- Environmental impact of reservoirs
- Environmental impact of the energy industry
- Environmental impact of fishing
- Environmental impact of irrigation
- Environmental impact of mining
- Environmental impact of paint
- Environmental impact of paper
- Environmental impact of pesticides
- Environmental implications of nanotechnology
- Environmental impact of shipping
- Environmental impact of war
- Marine pollution
- Pollution
