= The Environmentalism of the Poor: A Study of Ecological Conflicts and Valuation =

2002 non-fiction book by Joan Martinez Alier

The Environmentalism of the Poor
- Author: Joan Martinez Alier
- Subject: Environmentalism of the poor
- Genre: Non-fiction
- Publisher: Edward Elgar Publishing
- Publication date: 2002
- ISBN: 978-1-84064-909-3

The Environmentalism of the Poor: A Study of Ecological Conflicts and Valuation is a 2002 non-fiction book by Joan Martinez Alier about the environmentalism of the poor.

== Publication ==
The Environmentalism of the Poor was written by Joan Martinez Alier, an ecological economist and a professor emeritus of Universitat Autònoma de Barcelona. The 328-page book was published by Edward Elgar Publishing in 2002.

== Synopsis ==
The book documents advocacy and efforts of environmental justice and organized labour efforts in Latin America and Asia. Examples cover the 19th-century onwards. In the book, Martinez Alier links environmental harm to industrialisation and economic growth. He notes how the harm impacts populations inequitably.

== Critical reception ==
Varun Nayar writing for Himal Southasian described the book as an "influential framework". Pat Devine, writing in Environmental Values described the book as "wonderful" noting it to be "rich inn empirical details, full of theoretical insights, offering hope in a bleak world, altogether inspiring".

Natalie Oswin from the University of British Columbia, writing in Antipode journal, criticised the author's for a lack of critique of neo-Malthusianism and for "homogenised notion of the 'poor.'"
