= Triple planetary crisis =

Three intersecting global environmental crises

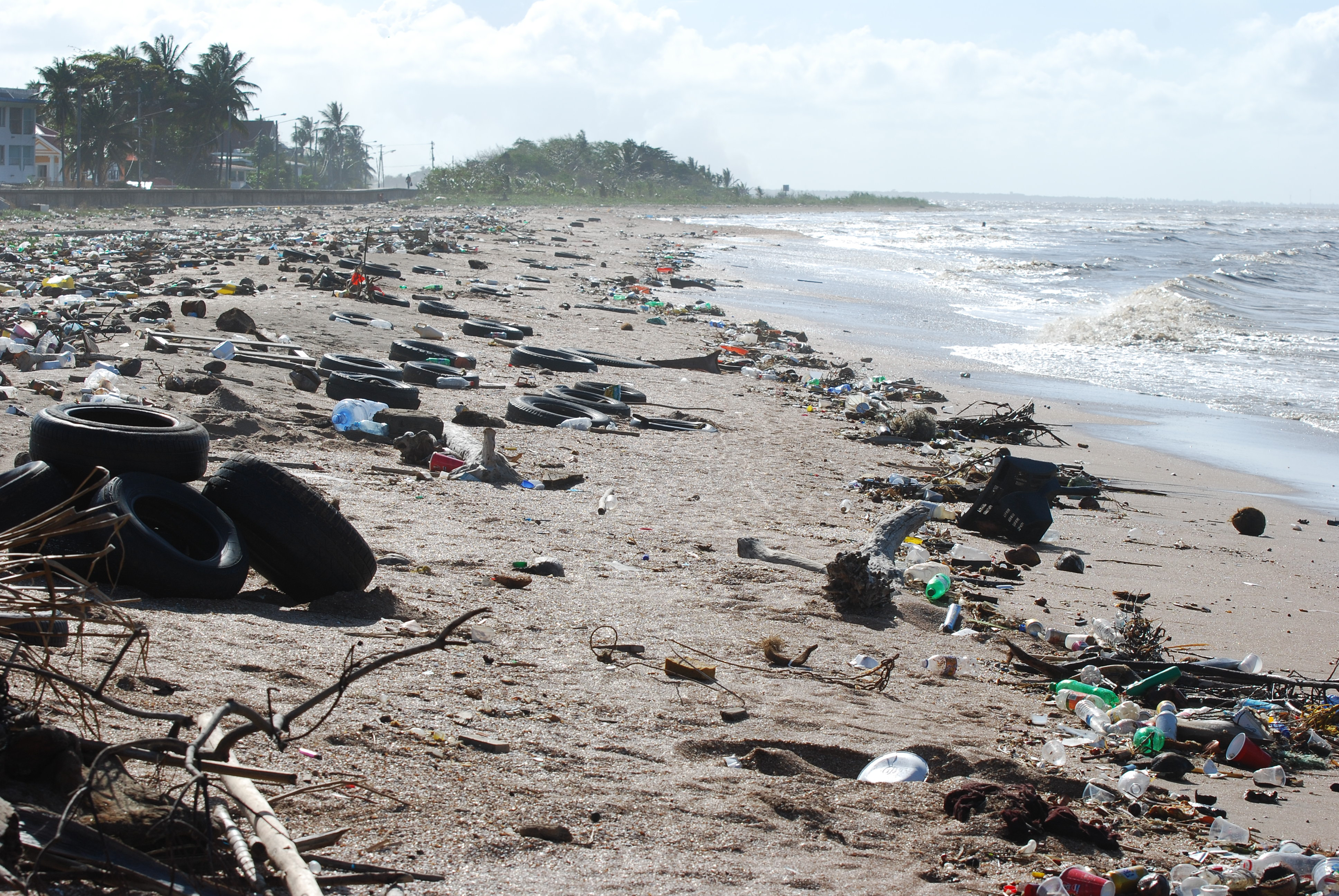
Pollution on a beach in Guyana

Triple planetary crisis is a term and framework adopted by the United Nations system to describe the three intersecting global environmental crises of pollution, climate crisis, biodiversity loss and/or ecological crises. This term underscores the interdependence of these issues and their collective impact on the planet's ecosystems, societies, and economies.

The three crises interconnect to increase environmental risks and cause global economic loss. The framework is designed to address the need to mitigate and adapt to the challenges posed by pollution, climate crisis, and biodiversity loss.

The framework is similar to other multidimensional analyses of human impacts on the environment including global catastrophic risk and planetary boundaries. For further information about human impacts on the environment, see environmental issues.

== Pollution ==
The pollution crisis includes various forms of pollution, including air pollution, water pollution, and soil contamination. It is characterized by the release of pollutants and harmful chemicals such as synthetic organic chemicals, plastics, and metals into the environment, impacting both human health and ecosystems. As reported by The Lancet Commission on pollution and health, pollution stands as the leading environmental cause of disease and death. In 2015, an estimated 9 million premature deaths were attributed to illnesses linked to pollution. With over 80% of urban populations currently exposed to air quality levels greater than World Health Organization limits, air pollution levels in many urban cities, particularly those from low and middle income countries, are rising. Furthermore, pollution can impact the ecosystem through albedo reduction, ocean acidification, ozone depletion, and more.

== Climate crisis ==
The climate crisis encompasses global warming and climate change, which have resulted from the excessive accumulation of greenhouse gases in the Earth's atmosphere. It leads to rising temperatures, sea-level rise, and extreme weather events such as extreme precipitation, flooding, extreme heat events, severe storms, drought and more. Furthermore, these conditions can lead to food and water insecurity, displacement and migration from coastal areas, an increase in transmission of water-borne diseases, and more.

== Biodiversity loss ==
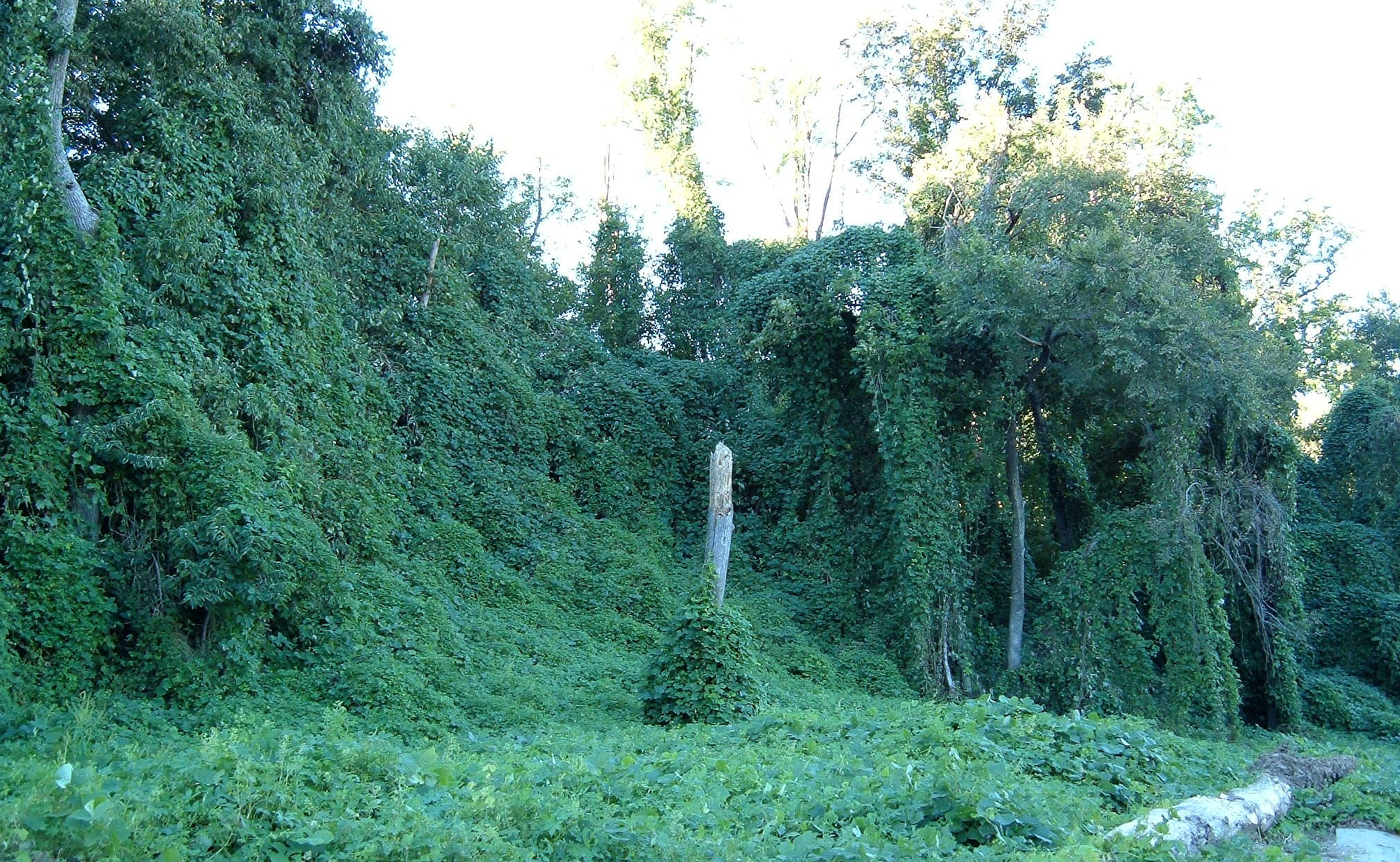
Kudzu, an invasive species, on trees in Atlanta, Georgia

Biodiversity loss or ecological crisis refers to the significant reduction in the variety and abundance of species in ecosystems worldwide. Anthropogenic activities such as habitat destruction, overexploitation, and invasive species contribute to this crisis. The consequences of biodiversity loss on ecological processes have as significant of an impact as various other prominent drivers of global environmental change such as climate change, forms of pollution, and more. With up to one million plant and animal species facing the threat of extinction, biodiversity loss hurts an ecosystem's ability to properly function, making it harder for it to maintain a healthy environment. Furthermore, a loss in biodiversity makes it harder for ecosystems to adapt to climate change. With over half the global GDP being dependent on nature and the livelihoods of over 1 billion people worldwide connected to forests, the consequences of biodiversity loss are extensive.

== The role of the United Nations ==
The United Nations system, through various agencies and initiatives, work to address the crisis alongside its member states. Currently, these include UN Climate Change, UN Environment, UN Biodiversity, the UN Convention to Combat Desertification and the UN High Commissioner for Refugees, which aims to provide aid to refugees displaced by the climate crisis.

For further information on consequences of the climate crisis, see effects of climate change.

== See also ==
- Sustainable Development Goals
- Wildlife Conservation
- Environmental Policy
- United Nations Environment Programme
- Intergovernmental Panel on Climate Change
- Intergovernmental Science-Policy Platform on Biodiversity and Ecosystem Services
- Intergovernmental Science-Policy Panel on Chemicals, Waste and Pollution
