= Environmental defender =

Individuals or collectives protecting the environment

Environmental defenders or environmental human rights defenders are individuals or collectives who protect the environment from harms resulting from resource extraction, hazardous waste disposal, infrastructure projects, land appropriation, or other dangers. In 2019, the UN Human Rights Council unanimously recognised their importance to environmental protection. The term environmental defender is broadly applied to a diverse range of environmental groups and leaders from different cultures that all employ different tactics and hold different agendas. Use of the term is contested, as it homogenizes such a wide range of groups and campaigns, many of whom do not self-identify with the term and may not have explicit aims to protect the environment (being motivated primarily by social justice concerns).

Environmental defenders involved in environmental conflicts face a wide range of threats from governments, local elites, and other powers that benefit from projects that defenders oppose. Global Witness reported 1,922 murders of environmental defenders in 57 countries between 2002 and 2019, with indigenous people accounting for approximately one third of this total. Documentation of this violence is incomplete. The UN Special Rapporteur on human rights reported that as many as one hundred environmental defenders are intimidated, arrested or otherwise harassed for every one that is killed.

== Background ==
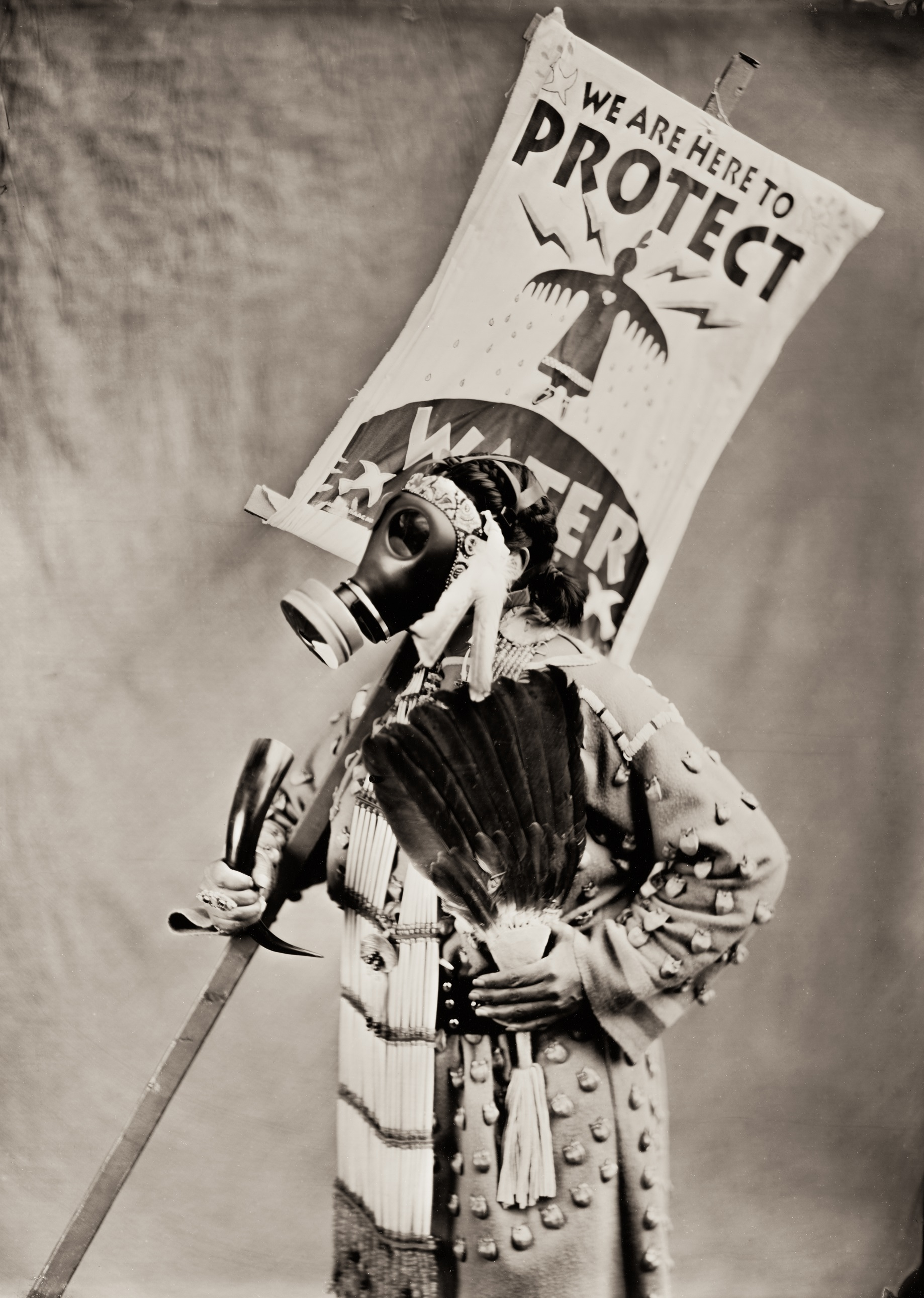
Water protector - No Spiritual Surrender" with Floris White Bull, Hunkpapa Lakota - Cochiti Pueblo. Holding protest sign with image of Thunderbird Woman created by Isaac Murdoch, Serpent River First Nation.

There is a long history of people protecting their environment from the harms associated with economic production. This has previously been discussed in terms of environmental justice, environmentalism of the poor, ecological distribution conflicts, settler colonialism, and other theories that closely relate to the environmental defender framework. Academic papers, the media, and various NGOs have increasingly used the term environmental defender, environmental human rights defender, and land defender to describe people struggling to protect their land from pollution or dispossession, especially since the UN Declaration on Human Rights Defenders in 1998. This increasing use of the term has been accompanied by expanded infrastructure to protect defenders engaging in this work. Environmental defenders are typically viewed as a subset of human rights defenders and are associated with the legal theory of fundamental human rights promoted by the United Nations. They work to establish or protect the fundamental right to a healthy environment.

The environmental defender framework is not evenly used across languages and may have different connotations in different regions. For example, the French défenseurs de l'environnement may refer to environmentalists in general and be largely applied to people in the Global North. Many front-line defenders do not self-identify with the term, preferring a very broad range of other identifications such as: water protector, grassroots environmentalist, life defender, nature defender, ecologist, environmentalist, community leader, and many others. Environmental conflicts in urban areas or middle to high income countries tend to draw terminology from the environmental justice framework. Conflicts in rural areas and low income countries often use terms related to environmentalism of the poor. Indigenous scholars point out that they have been defending their lands for centuries, and describe their struggles in terms of settler colonialism. Environmental protection may not be the explicit agenda of some environmental defender communities who may be primarily motivated by issues of social justice or Indigenous land rights. However, the scope of resource extraction projects carried out by local rural communities is dwarfed by multinational mining and agri-business interests, so even when local environmental defender communities are motivated by their own resource extraction agendas, the net effect is to preserve the environment. Thus, environmental defenders' involvement in conflicts over land and resources often explicitly promote environmental protection, but not always.

=== Global movement ===
Environmental defenders are on the front-lines of a global environmental justice movement in which individual place-based conflicts (ie, ecological distribution conflicts) contribute to a growing environmental justice framework that continually contributes new concepts to the narratives of environmental protection and social justice. Ecological economists suggest that industrialised economies continually require new frontiers for resource extraction, leading to increasing ecological distribution conflicts. The last strongholds of biodiversity protected by Indigenous people are now being targeted for resource extraction. Several researchers and the UN Human Rights Council have concluded that continued protection of these strongholds by environmental defenders may be indispensable to environmental protection and the mitigation of climate change.

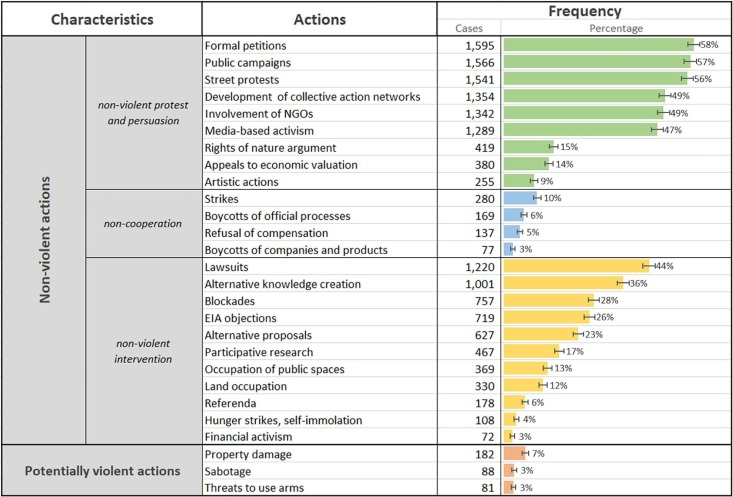
Environmental defenders use a wide range of tactics

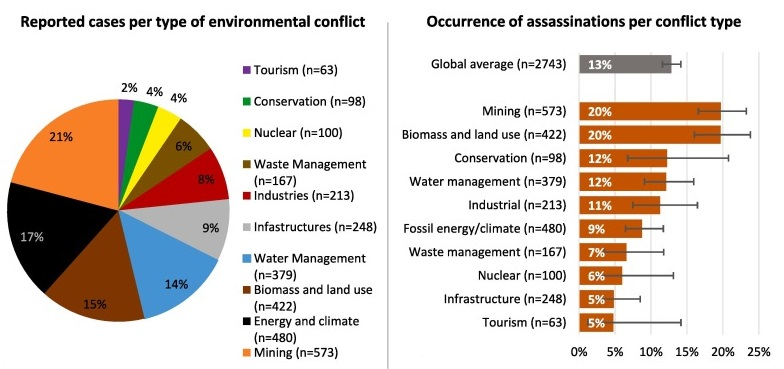
Most environmental conflicts are in the mining, energy, and waste disposal sectors.

The Environmental Justice Atlas documents over 3500 ecological distribution conflicts globally. Studies drawing upon this database and other information sources have revealed a number of patterns that researchers are hoping will better enable understanding of global environmental justice trends and protection of environmental defenders. Salient patterns include:

- Greater rates of assassinations are associated with conflicts in the mining and agrarian sectors.
- Low income countries have more conflicts in rural areas related to conservation, biomass, land use, and water management. High income countries have more conflicts in urban or semi-urban areas related to waste disposal, tourism, nuclear power, industrial and infrastructure projects.
- Indigenous people are most frequently mobilised against environmental harms and are involved in 41% of documented cases. Involvement of Indigenous people is associated with much higher rates of assassination.
- Successful environmental justice campaigns (resulting in cancellation of a project or favorable legal ruling) typically utilise a wide variety of non-violent tactics. Project cancellation resulted in 26.7% of reported campaigns.
- Women may be disproportionally impacted by ecological distribution conflicts owing to gendered division of labor and unequal power distribution. Women environmental defenders also face gendered violence such as forced prostitution, rape, and disappearances of indigenous women.

== Violence against defenders ==
Global Witness reported 1,922 murders of environmental defenders in 57 countries between 2002 and 2019, with indigenous people accounting for approximately one third of this total. On average, three defenders are killed every week. Documentation of this violence is also incomplete. The UN Special Rapporteur on human rights reported that as many as one hundred environmental defenders are intimidated, arrested or otherwise harassed for every one that is killed.

=== Multi-dimensional violence ===
While violence in environmental conflicts is commonly understood as discrete events (such as a disappearance, rape, or assassination), some studies indicate that complete understanding of violence against environmental defender communities requires a multidimensional approach. In addition to commonly reported direct violence, structural violence (embedded in social, political and economic structures), cultural violence (embedded in language, religion, or ideology), slow violence (such as cumulative exposure to low-level toxins), and ecological violence (such as degradation of subsistence resources) all contribute to violence experienced by defender communities.

== Legal framework ==
The Aarhus Convention (1998) states that individuals have the right to access to environmental information, participate in environmental decision-making, and have access to justice. These consideration are also protected in article 10 of the Rio Declaration. The right to a healthy environment is protected in several regional international agreements including the African Charter on Human and Peoples' Rights, the American Convention on Human Rights, the Escazu Agreement, the Arab Charter on Human Rights, and the ASEAN Declaration on Human Rights.

== Criticism and response ==
Opposition to environmental defenders may take the form of criminalisation or political ostracisation that frames environmental defender actions in terms of larger political debates. For example, in Colombia líderes ambientales (environmental leaders) are frequently cast as leftist radicals and targeted by paramilitary and government security forces. In the Global North, the war on terror has resulted in increased criminalization of environmental defenders.

Although environmental defenders rarely use potentially violent tactics, governments and others may criticise defender actions on the occasions when they do engage in property damage or similar actions. For example, Jessica Reznicek was prosecuted in the USA for damaging construction equipment being used to build the Dakota Access Pipeline, and the judge applied additional time to her sentence in a 'terrorism enhancement'.

There are also important critiques of the environmental defender concept or environmental defender communities based in historical context or moral ambiguities. These include individualisation of collective action, colonial origins of the term, and complex situations involving conservation or renewable energy projects.

=== Individualisation ===
Although most academic sources and the United Nations define environmental defenders to include groups of people, the media and advocacy groups typically report on individual defenders, resulting in the term having an individualizing effect on public perception of ecological distribution conflicts. This may obscure the collective nature of ecological distribution conflicts, further endanger individual leaders, and exacerbate internal conflicts among defender communities.

Individualisation of environmental defenders can also result in martyrisation. Martyrs can have the effect of broadening support for ecological distribution conflicts, consolidating alliances, and improve chances of success. For example in the Philippines, the murder of Macli-ing Dulag led to widespread mobilisation against the Chico River dam and cancellation of the project. However, martyrisation does not uniformly contribute to the success of ecological distribution conflicts. Under particularly repressive regimes, deaths of defenders may simply lead to attrition; in countries with high murder rates, deaths of defenders may pass essentially unnoticed.

=== Renewable energy and conservation ===
Many ecological distribution conflicts result from resource extraction or land uses associated with renewable energy or conservation. Environmental defenders protecting their land from these dangers have been criticised for interfering with development that may be perceived necessary for climate change mitigation, protection of endangered species, or the "public good". These instances highlight moral ambiguities that may exist in struggles by environmental defender communities. For example, protection of the Virunga National Park in the Democratic Republic of the Congo has been militarized, and rangers have had conflicts with local Indigenous people, leading to criticism of 'militarized conservation'.

Land uses and infrastructure projects related to renewable energy frequently result in environmental conflict; there are several hundred conflicts listed on the EJAtlas related to renewable energy infrastructure. For example, hydroelectric dams are integral to many experts' plans for climate change mitigation, but they displace large numbers of people and are the most frequent causes of conflicts in the renewable energy sector. Siting of utility scale wind and solar projects also have environmental justice implications, as do resource extraction for copper, lithium, and other critical minerals required for renewable energy infrastructure. Thacker Pass lithium mine in the USA is an example of a conflict in the renewable energy sector where environmental defenders oppose an open-pit mine that other environmentalists believe necessary to supply lithium for electric car batteries to support a proposed climate change mitigation strategy.

=== Colonialism ===
Association with the legal framework of universal human rights has led to criticism of the environmental defender concept as a colonial label imposed upon communities who do not identify with the concept or the Western enlightenment ideology that produced the human rights framework. Colville scholar Dina Gilio-Whitaker points out that emphasis on the right to a healthy environment and environmental justice may presume a capitalistic commodification of land that is inconsistent with Indigenous worldviews. UN special rapporteur John Knox has suggested that adoption of the right to a healthy environment has been led by countries in the Global South and may contribute to the decolonisation of human rights law.

== See also ==
- Eco-socialism
