= Environmental conflict =

Social conflict caused by environmental factors

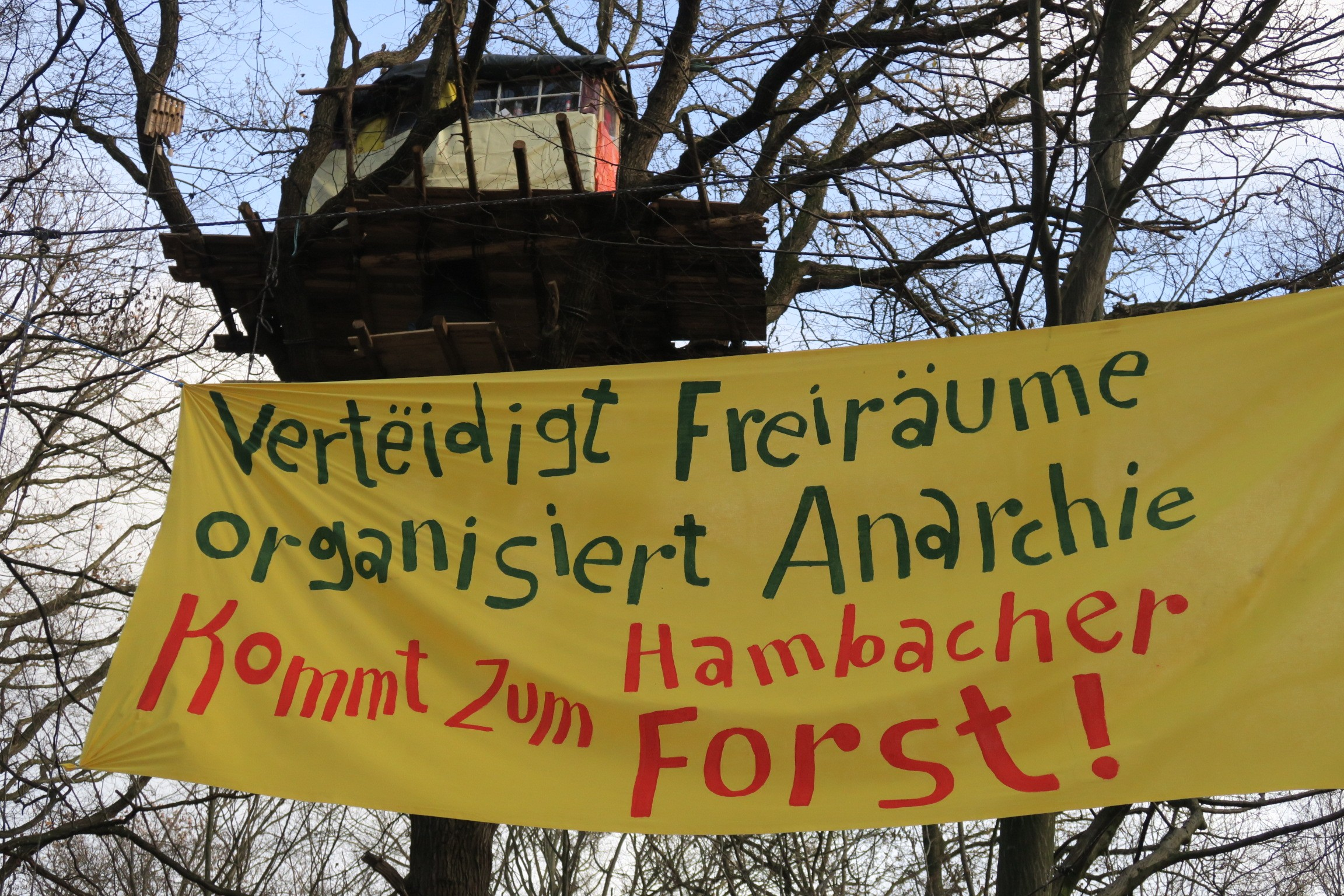
Hambach Forest protest against coal mine expansion

Environmental conflicts, socio-environmental conflict or ecological distribution conflicts (EDCs) are social conflicts caused by environmental degradation or by unequal distribution of environmental resources. The Environmental Justice Atlas documented 3,100 environmental conflicts worldwide as of April 2020 and emphasised that many more conflicts remained undocumented.

Parties involved in these conflicts include locally affected communities, states, companies and investors, and social or environmental movements; typically environmental defenders are protecting their homelands from resource extraction or hazardous waste disposal. Resource extraction and hazardous waste activities often create resource scarcities (such as by overfishing or deforestation), pollute the environment, and degrade the living space for humans and nature, resulting in conflict. A particular case of environmental conflicts are forestry conflicts, or forest conflicts which "are broadly viewed as struggles of varying intensity between interest groups, over values and issues related to forest policy and the use of forest resources". In the last decades, a growing number of these have been identified globally.

Frequently environmental conflicts focus on environmental justice issues, the rights of indigenous people, the rights of peasants, or threats to communities whose livelihoods are dependent on the ocean. Outcomes of local conflicts are increasingly influenced by trans-national environmental justice networks that comprise the global environmental justice movement.

Environmental conflict can complicate response to natural disaster or exacerbate existing conflicts – especially in the context of geopolitical disputes or where communities have been displaced to create environmental migrants. The study of these conflicts is related to the fields of ecological economics, political ecology, and environmental justice.

== Causes ==
The origin of environmental conflicts can be directly linked to the industrial economy. As less than 10% of materials and energy are recycled, the industrial economy is constantly expanding energy and material extraction at commodity frontiers through two main processes:

1. Appropriating new natural resources through territorial claims and land grabs.
2. Making exploitation of existing sites more efficient through investments or social and technical innovation

EDCs are caused by the unfair distribution of environmental costs and benefits. These conflicts arise from social inequality, contested claims over territory, the proliferation of extractive industries, and the impacts of the economic industrialization over the past centuries. Oil, mining, and agriculture industries are focal points of environmental conflicts.

== Types of conflicts ==
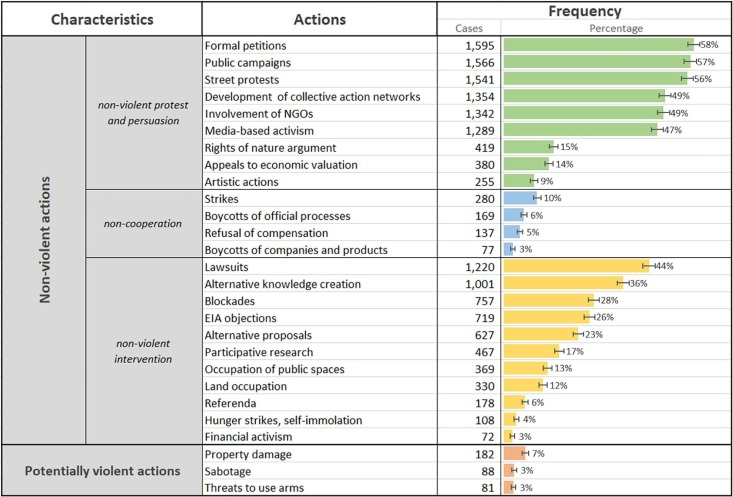
Environmental defenders use a wide range of tactics

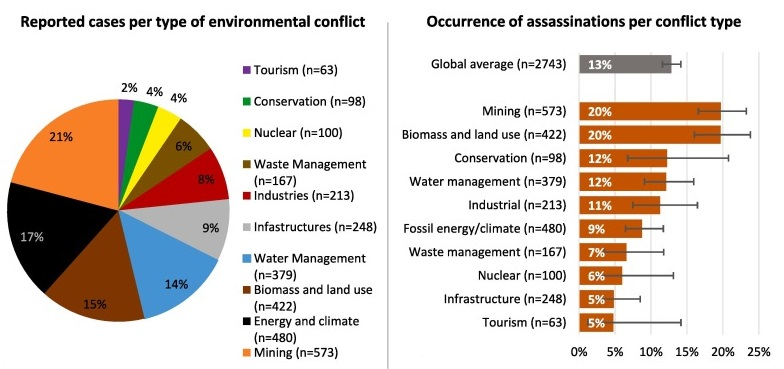
Most environmental conflicts are in the mining, energy, and waste disposal sectors.

A 2020 paper mapped the arguments and concerns of environmental defenders in over 2743 conflicts found in the Environmental Justice Atlas (EJAtlas). The analysis found that the industrial sectors most frequently challenged by environmental conflicts were mining (21%), fossil energy (17%), biomass and land uses (15%), and water management (14%). Killings of environmental defenders happened in 13% of the reported cases.

There was also a distinct difference in the types of conflict found in high and low income countries. There were more conflicts around conservation, water management, and biomass and land use in low income countries; while in high income countries almost half of conflicts focused on waste management, tourism, nuclear power, industrial zones, and other infrastructure projects. The study also found that most conflicts start with self-organized local groups defending against infringement, with a focus on non-violent tactics.

Water protectors and land defenders who defend indigenous rights are criminalized at a much higher rate than in other conflicts.

Environmental conflicts can be classified based on the different stages of the commodity chain: during the extraction of energy sources or materials, in the transportation and production of goods, or at the final disposal of waste.

=== EJAtlas Categories ===
The EJAtlas was founded and is co-directed by Leah Temper and Joan Martinez-Alier, and it is coordinated by Daniela Del Bene. Its aim is “to document, understand and analyse the political outcomes that emerge or that may emerge” from ecological distribution conflicts. It is housed at the ICTA of the Universitat Autonoma de Barcelona. Since 2012, academics and activists have collaborated to write the entries, reaching 3,500 by July 2021.

The EJ Atlas identifies ten categories of ecological distribution conflicts:

1. Biodiversity conservation conflicts:
2. Biomass and land conflicts (Forests, Agriculture, Fisheries and Livestock Management)
3. Fossil Fuels and Climate Justice/Energy
4. Industrial and Utilities Conflicts
5. Infrastructure and Built Environment
6. Mineral Ores and Building Materials Extraction
7. Nuclear
8. Tourism Recreation
9. Waste Management
10. Water Management

== Ecological distribution conflicts ==
Ecological Distribution Conflicts (EDCs) were introduced as a concept in 1995 by Joan Martínez-Alier and Martin O'Connor to facilitate more systematic documentation and analysis of environmental conflicts and to produce a more coherent body of academic, activist, and legal work around them. EDCs arise from the unfair access to natural resources, unequally distributed burdens of environmental pollution, and relate to the exercise of power by different social actors when they enter into disputes over access to or impacts on natural resources. For example, a factory may pollute a river thus affecting the community whose livelihood depends on the water of the river. The same can apply to the climate crisis, which may cause sea level rise on some Pacific islands. This type of damage is often not valued by the market, preventing those affected from being compensated.

Ecological conflicts occur at both global and local scales. Often conflicts take place between the global South and the global North, e.g. a Finnish forest company operating in Indonesia, or in econonomic peripheries, although there is a growing emergence of conflicts in Europe, including violent ones. There are also local conflicts that occur within a short commodity chain (e.g. local extraction of sand and gravel for a nearby cement factory).

=== Intellectual history ===
Since its conception, the term Ecological Distribution Conflict has been linked to research from the fields of political ecology, ecological economics, and ecofeminism. It has also been adopted into a non-academic setting through the environmental justice movement, where it branches academia and activism to assist social movements in legal struggles.

In his 1874 lecture ‘Wage Labour and Capital’, Karl Marx introduced the idea that economic relations under capitalism are inherently exploitative, meaning economic inequality is an inevitability of the system. He theorised that this is because capitalism expands through capital accumulation, an ever-increasing process which requires the economic subjugation of parts of the population in order to function.

Building on this theory, academics in the field of political economy created the term ‘economic distribution conflicts’ to describe the conflicts that occur from this inherent economic inequality. This type of conflict typically occurs between parties with an economic relationship but unequal power dynamic, such as buyers and sellers, or debtors and creditors.

However, Martinez Allier and Martin O’Connor noticed that this term focuses solely on the economy, omitting the conflicts that do not occur from economic inequality but from the unequal distribution of environmental resources. In response, in 1995, they coined the term ‘ecological distribution conflict’. This type of conflict occurs at commodity frontiers, which are constantly being moved and reframed due to society's unsustainable social metabolism. These conflicts might occur between extractive industries and Indigenous populations, or between polluting actors and those living on marginalised land. Its roots can still be seen in Marxian theory, as it is based on the idea that capitalism's need for expansion drives inequality and conflict.

Unfair ecological distribution can be attributed to capitalism as a system of cost-shifting. Neoclassical economics usually consider these impacts as “market failures” or “externalities” that can be valued in monetary terms and internalized into the price system. Ecological economics and political ecology scholars oppose the idea of economic commensuration that could form the basis of eco-compensation mechanisms for impacted communities. Instead, they advocate for different valuation languages such as sacredness, livelihood, rights of nature, Indigenous territorial rights, archaeological values, and ecological or aesthetic value.

== Social movements ==
Ecological distribution conflicts have given rise to many environmental justice movements around the globe. Environmental justice scholars conclude that these conflicts are a force for sustainability. These scholars study the dynamics that drive these conflicts towards an environmental justice success or a failure.

Globally, around 17% of all environmental conflicts registered in the EJAtlas report environmental justices 'successes', such as stopping an unsustainable project or redistributing resources in a more egalitarian way.

Movements usually shape their repertoires of contention as protest forms and direct actions, which are influenced by national and local backgrounds. In environmental justice struggles, the biophysical characteristics of the conflict can further shape the forms of mobilization and direct action. Resistance strategies can take advantage of ‘biophysical opportunity structures’, where they attempt to identify, change or disrupt the damaging ecological processes they are confronting.

Finally, the ‘collective action frames’ of movements emerging in response to environmental conflicts becomes very powerful when they challenge the mainstream relationship of human societies with the environment. These frames are often expressed through pithy protest slogans, that scholars refer to as the ‘vocabulary of environmental justice’ and which includes concepts and phrases such as ‘environmental racism’, ‘tree plantations are not forests’, ‘keep the oil in the soil’, ‘keep the coal in the hole’ and the like, resonating and empathizing with those communities affected by EDC.

=== Environmentalism of the poor ===
Some scholars make a distinction between environmentalist conflicts that have an objective of sustainability or resource conservation and environmental conflicts more broadly (which are any conflict over a natural resource). The former type of conflict gives rise to environmentalism of the poor, in which environmental defenders protect their land from degradation by industrial economic forces. Environmentalist conflicts tend to be intermodal conflicts in which peasant or agricultural land uses are in conflict with industrial uses (such as mining). Intramodal conflicts, in which peasants dispute amongst themselves about land use may not be environmentalist.

In this division movement such as La Via Campesina (LVC), or the International Planning Committee for Food Sovereignty (IPC) can be considered in the halfway between these two approaches. In their defense of peasant agriculture and against large-scale capitalist industrial agriculture, both LVC and the IPC have fundamentally contributed to promoting agroecology as a sustainable agriculture model across the globe, adopting an intermodal approach against industrial agriculture and providing new sources of education to poor communities that could incentive an aware integration in the redistribution of resources. A similar attitude has shaped the action of the Brazilian Landless Farmworkers movement (MST) in the way it has struggled with the idea of productivity and the use of chemical products by several agribusiness realities that destroy resources rich in fertility and biodiversity.

Such movements often question the dominant form of valuation of resource uses (i.e. monetary values and cost-benefit analyses) and renegotiate the values deemed relevant for sustainability. Sometimes, particularly when the resistance weakens, demands for monetary compensation are made (in a framework of ‘weak sustainability’). The same groups, at other times or when feeling stronger, might argue in terms of values which are not commensurate with money, such as indigenous territorial rights, irreversible ecological values, human right to health or the sacredness of redefining the very economic, ecological and social principles behind particular uses of the Mother Earth, implicitly defending a conception of ‘strong sustainability’. In contesting and environment, such intermodal conflicts are those that are most clearly forced towards broader sustainability transitions.

== Conflict resolution ==
A distinct field of conflict resolution called Environmental Conflict Resolution, focuses on developing collaborative methods for deescalating and resolving environmental conflicts. As a field of practice, people working on conflict resolution focus on the collaboration, and consensus building among stakeholders. An analysis of such resolution processes found that the best predictor of successful resolution was sufficient consultation with all parties involved.

A new tool with certain potential in this regard is the development of video games proposing distinct options to the gamers for handling conflicts over environmental resources, for instance in the fishery sector.

== Critique ==
Some scholars critique the focus on natural resources used in descriptions of environmental conflict. Often these approaches focus on the commercialization of the natural environment that doesn't acknowledge the underlying value of a healthy environment.

== See also ==
- US Institute for Environmental Conflict Resolution
- Inventory of Conflict and Environment
