= Inventory of Conflict and Environment =

Computer system to investigate conflicts

The Inventory of Conflict and Environment (ICE) is a project initiated by Jim Lee, School of International Service (SIS) at American University in Washington, D.C. He has also written extensively on environment and conflict, including the book "Hot and Cold Wars". The ICE project makes use of case research and computer applications in international relations research. The cases can be searched through a pattern matching tool. ICE establishes a perspective in which disaggregated data is combined with geographic information in the study of conflicts.

ICE Case studies are sets of categorical research projects meant to spur further research in specific areas of international dispute. The ICE cases are related to the Trade and Environment Database project (TED). Since 1991, the TED and ICE projects have produced over a range of case study projects. ICE has about 300 cases. Among the practical uses of such case studies, ICE provides information on environmental refugees, conflict dimensions, countries involved and related issues. ICE case studies have been of interest in both research and policy arenas. The ICE cases can be found HERE.

Conflict and environment are modern and age-old problems and the cases represent this continuum of impact. The history of conflict and environment dates back many thousands of years. AT the root of these cases are control over resources and migrations of peoples. These two drivers will remain at the core of environmental conflict cases, now and in the future.

== ICE cases and the ICE search engine ==
ICE project is an evolving search engine and a tool for looking at international conflicts in the context of events and in contexts of similar and/or different typologies. It is also a tool for scenario creation for analyzing new cases. Several researchers, students and universities have been part of the ICE project. It is the product of melding together approaches to the separate fields of environment and conflict studies.

The ICE system identifies the elements of conflict as aspects of a parsed scenario. Using ICE, an evaluation of any specific event or series of events facilitates consideration of an array of factors. These factors include several types of information, including general, environmental, conflict, and decisions. These are represented by a series of indicators grouped into basket of categories. These factors are also searchable items on the search engine.

Environment Indicators
1. Continent
2. Region
3. Country
4. Habitat
5. Environ Problem
6. Scope
Conflict Indicators
1. Trigger
2. Type
3. Outcome
4. Conflict Level
5. Time Period
6. Duration

The "inferential" ICE search engine offers a pattern matching system and an additional weighting component for the researcher's evaluation and analysis. The Ice Search and Create Scenario Tool is an upgraded version with more user options. The SST lets the user imagine new cases, input relevant attributes and see how it compares to other ICE cases. These scenarios come with a simple automated case analysis and can be saved or results downloaded.
