= Environmentalism of the poor =

Environmental protection by the global poor

Environmentalism of the poor is a set of social movements that arise from environmental conflicts when impoverished people struggle against a powerful state or private interests that threaten their livelihood, health, sovereignty, and culture. Environmentalism of the poor differs from mainstream environmentalism by emphasizing social justice issues instead of concentrating on conservation and eco-efficiency. It is becoming an increasingly important in discussing global sustainability.

As described by Joan Martinez Alier, the environmentalism of the poor is a set of struggles and practices in which the so-called poor people engage whenever they are threatened by ecological distribution conflicts. Ecological distribution conflicts, also defined by Martínez-Alier, are social conflicts that appear when the ecological impacts of an economic activity are unevenly and unjustly distributed among society; usually, the ecological impacts are disregarded and not taken care of by businesses, and affect much more those who have less resources to fight them. Therefore, in this sense, the environmentalism of the poor consists of the struggles of those poor people against the economic activities that unjustly affect them. Past examples include the Chipko movement and the Indigenous people's struggles against Brazilian agribusiness.

Environmentalism of the poor includes a myriad of environmental movements in the global South that are strikingly under-represented in the discourse of mainstream environmentalism. However, impoverished people embroiled in local conflicts are becoming more aware of the global environmental justice movement, and trans-national environmental justice networks enable these environmental defenders to potentially leverage international support for their struggles.

== Background ==
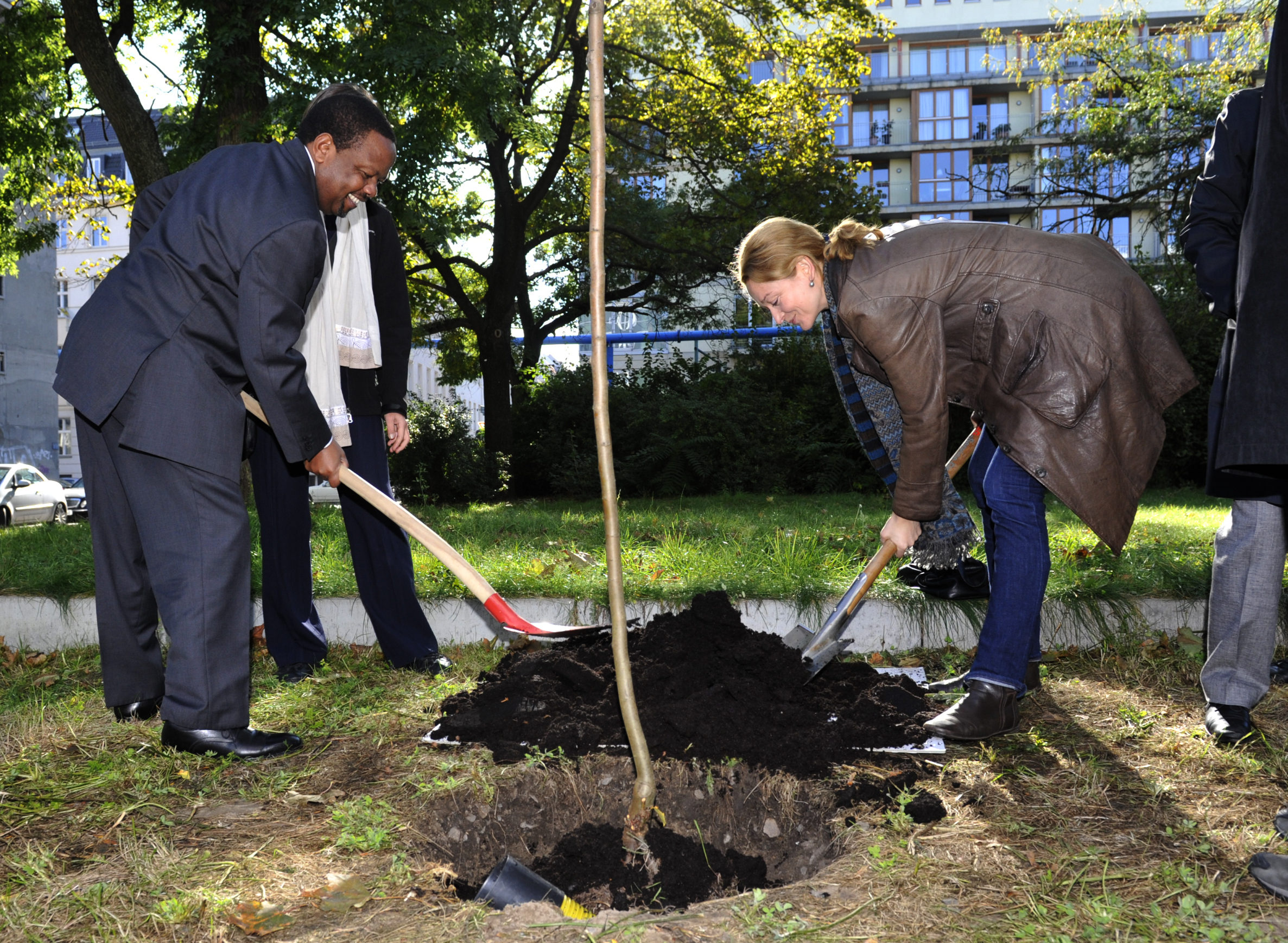
In October 2011, the Kenyan Ambassador to Germany, Ken Osinde, planted a tree in honor of Wangari Maathai of the Green Belt Movement in the garden of the Heinrich Böll Foundation's office in Berlin.

In 1988, Peruvian historian Alberto Flores Galindo suggested the term 'environmentalism of the poor' to describe eco-socialist peasant resistance movements, being inspired by the narodniki movement. In 1997 Joan Martinez-Alier and Ramachandra Guha contrasted these movements with the 'full-belly environmentalism' of the global North and drew parallels between rural and third-world 'environmentalism of the poor' and the more urban environmental justice movement arising in the United States.

=== Varieties of environmentalism ===
In his 2002 book, Environmentalism of the Poor, Martinez-Alier describes three different currents within environmentalism: the 'cult of the wilderness'; the later 'gospel of eco-efficiency' and the growing environmental justice movement or 'environmentalism of the poor'.

==== Cult of Wilderness ====
The Cult of the Wilderness, also called "wilderness thinking" by Ramachandra Guha, is associated with the conservation movement and people like John Muir, and Henry David Thoreau. This movement arose in the 19th century with organizations such as the Sierra Club and the Audubon Society; Aldo Leopold, with his 1949 book A Sand County Almanac, was also one of the main figures

The cult of wilderness is not inherently against economic activity, but rather the conservation movement tries to limit its effects on the natural environment. Aldo Leopold said that "a thing is right when it tends to preserve the integrity, stability, and beauty of the biotic community. It is wrong when it tends otherwise". The main course of action proposed by conservationists is to separate economic activity and the environment, limiting the effects of the former on the latter. The main tools to do so are natural reserves and protected areas, in which human activity is regulated. By creating these spaces, the conservationists intend to perform a "rearguard action" to preserve nature. This rearguard action consists of conservation practices such as ecosystem management, habitat restoration, or recuperation of endangered species.

The main reasons given for this type of environmentalism are very diverse. Some authors take a utilitarian approach: Nature is seen as essential to economic and social development, and the creation of reserves and protected areas aims to preserve it for it to keep providing ecosystem services and natural capital for society. Thus, biodiversity loss is the main concern, since biodiversity is crucial for providing natural capital and ecosystem services (both crucial to economic development).

Other reasons usually given are the inherent aesthetic value of nature, the religious value of nature, the inherently humane tendency to be attracted by nature (biophilia), and the right of nature and its species to exist by their own right.

Milestones of this type of conservationism are the Convention on Biological Diversity in Rio de Janeiro (1992), the Endangered Species Act of 1973, or the creation of the Yellowstone and Yosemite National Parks in the USA. Currently, it is institutionally represented by the International Union for Conservation of Nature (IUCN), the World Wide Fund (WWF) and The Nature Conservancy. On the activist side, it is represented by deep ecology and the conservationist movement.

==== The "gospel of eco-efficiency" ====
The "gospel of eco-efficiency," or "scientific industrialism," originated with the 19th-century writings of Malthus and William Stanley Jevons and grew during the 20th century when the effects of pollution and resource exhaustion were more apparent. As Martinez Alier puts it, the gospel of eco-efficiency is "worried about the effects of economic growth not only on pristine areas but also on the industrial, agricultural and urban economy." Alier named the term in reference to Samuel P. Hays, who in his book Conservation and the Gospel of Efficiency (1959) described the Progressive Conservation Movement during the Progressive Era and the US Government's emphasis on resource management as a "gospel of efficiency."

The gospel of eco-efficiency asks questions such as, How is pollution going to affect economic development?; How can we minimize pollution?; How can we remediate its consequences?; How can we minimize the consumption of resources?; and How can we turn waste into a resource?.

Usually, the answers given go in the line of sustainable development, which the Brundtland report defines as ''development that meets the needs of the present without compromising the ability of future generations to meet their own needs''. The 'gospel of eco-efficiency' usually defends economic growth, but not at any cost. Instead, it searches for a growth that needs less and less resources and generates less and less pollution and waste, therefore minimizing its impacts and improving its sustainability: the so-called dematerialization of the economy. The defenders of the gospel usually argue that through improving the efficiency of technology it is possible to achieve high levels of economic development with very low levels of waste production and resource-consumption that are manageable for the ecosystems, thus becoming sustainable. However, many criticisms have been raised against the theory of dematerialization: mainly, that the entropy law makes it impossible to infinitely improve the efficiency of a technology; and that the decoupling of local rich economies is only possible because they outsource the production of material-intensive goods to the developing countries.

The main tools proposed by the 'gospel of eco-efficiency' concern (1) economic, eco-taxes and markets in emission permits, and (2) technological support for materials and energy-saving changes.

1. The 'gospel of eco-efficiency' is concerned with the efficiency of the production process, that is, the efficiency of the technologies involved in it. It focuses on finding solutions that improve the efficiency of resource use and of waste/pollution generation, mainly through investment in research and development.
2. It is also concerned with the efficiency of the economic market, and sees environmental problems as inefficiencies of it, not as structural problems of it. Therefore, it focuses on finding solutions to these inefficiencies, mainly through internalizing them in market accounts. The gospel is championed by environmental economics, a discipline that stands that the market has Negative Externalities that are not accounted as economic costs, and that if those are accounted as such, the market will readjust to reduce those costs, thus reducing the externalities. Some tools that environmental economics propose for accounting those costs are eco-taxes and emission permits.

According to Joan Martinez Alier, some of the most prominent proponents of the 'gospel of ecoefficiency are Gifford Pinchot in the US and the Wuppertal Institute for Climate, Environment and Energy in Europe. Pinchot was the head of the United States Forest Service during the Progressive Era, and advocated the conservation of the nation's reserves by planned use and renewal. The Wuppertal Institute pioneered industrial ecology in Europe during the 90s, and designed several high-efficiency products such as the Passive house and also developed indicators such as the material input per unit of service (MIPS).

== Environmentalism of the poor ==
=== Environmental Classism ===
Karen Bell describes environmental issues that stem from income inequalities, structural issues, class discrimination and hostilities between workers and environmentalists in addressing environmental justice as environmental classism. Rob Nixon covered the inequality of environmentalism in his 2011 book Slow violence and environmentalism of the poor coining the term slow violence.

In addition, there are issues in approaching environmental justice that occur from class inequalities. Both the 'cult of wilderness' and the 'gospel of eco-efficiency' are a bit technocratic (although it is not always the case). The 'cult of wilderness' has been associated with middle to upper-class people, with scientists, and with statisticians. The 'gospel of eco-efficiency' has been associated with state policies, with private businesses, and with scientists and engineers. And they have been historically associated with the Global North, and with white, cis-hetero males.

Environmentalism has therefore been historically seen as elitist, and poverty has been associated with environmentally damaging practices and disinterest in environmental concerns. For instance, the Brundtland Report concluded that poverty is one of the most important drivers of environmental degradation; political scientist Ronald Inglehart also argued that affluent societies are more likely to protect nature. Similarly, Kuznets curves associate environmental improvements with higher per-capita income, implying that the cure for environmental degradation is more growth. However, numerous case studies pointed out that poor people protect the environment against powerful interests to defend their livelihoods and cultures. Therefore, according to Martínez Alier, 'poor people' engage in this third current of environmentalism: the 'environmentalism of the poor' (or livelihood ecology, liberation ecology, the environmental justice movement, popular environmentalism, etc.).

The environmentalism of the poor emphasizes social justice and the protection of land for the use of marginalized people. Martinez-Alier draws upon political ecology and ecological economics to create a theoretical basis for a global environmental justice movement that arises from local environmental conflicts. This current of environmentalism arises from the uneven distribution of environmental harms among different sectors of society (what Martínez Alier and Martin O'Connor call ecological distribution conflicts), caused by economic activity and economic growth. This current of environmentalism, therefore, stands that the Global North exports environmental damage to the Global South, or that poor people are more likely to suffer environmental damage than rich people, or even that racialized people have a greater chance of suffering it than white people.

Therefore, it is composed of a myriad of different movements, all of which have one thing in common: the fact that due to this uneven distribution of environmental harms, their livelihoods are threatened (understanding livelihood in a broad sense; not only the material basis of human life, but also the cultural, communitarian and individual basis). Martínez Alier argues that, as the scale of the economy increases, 'poor people' are deprived of access to environmental resources and services, and they endure a disproportionate amount of pollution. Those 'poor people', whose livelihoods are threatened, struggle against the environmental harms that threaten them and against those responsible of the environmental harms.

In doing so, they protect their livelihoods, and this often means that they protect traditional ways of life that have coevolved in equilibrium with the environment, and that therefore are sustainable. This theory stands that traditional livelihoods have been historically shaped by the environmental conditions, and have learned to adapt to them, using sustainably the resources and the sinks available. Therefore, protecting them means protecting sustainable ways of life. For instance, traditional peasants have been actively protecting their sustainable, local way of life from the intensive, transnational model of agribusiness.

Martínez Alier argues that poor people simply protecting their livelihoods are often on the side of resource conservation and a clean environment, although they may not claim to be environmentalists and may use other language to describe their agendas (such as sacredness, sovereignty, etc.). Instead, he argues that people will resist environmental destruction that threatens their livelihood, culture, and prospects for survival, even if they aren't interested in protecting nature for its own sake. People will not easily give away their livelihoods in exchange for economic investment and development that offers them money, because values such as sovereignty and sacredness cannot be compared by monetary terms. For example, some cultures would deem money as valueless compared to the value of a sacred place, or compared to their freedom and sovereignty. Therefore, "poor people" often reject even the most economically profitable projects if they harm things that they value and that are part of their livelihood. Environmentalism of the poor is thus partly a struggle to control the valuation language applied to the costs and benefits of resource extraction, gentrification, and other processes that threaten poor people's use of their land.

Examples of environmentalism of the poor include the struggles against environmental racism in the United States, urban air pollution, and struggles against mines and struggles for access to water, struggles forests, etc.

=== Ecofeminism ===
Ecofeminism

Female leadership is common to environmentalism of the poor and creates intersections with eco-feminism. Women more often have social roles that bring them into direct contact with nature such as collecting water, growing crops, tending animals, gathering, etc. For example, in urban settings, women are most likely to take action against the dumping of waste or other pollution, even if gendered hierarchies prevent their participation. Ecological distribution conflicts not only affect unevenly poor people in general, but also affect women more because of their closer relationship with Nature and pollution. Therefore, women tend to participate more in environmental struggles. According to Johanna oksala, ''for women living under harsh material conditions, environmental activism is simply a form of self-defense'', because they want to protect their livelihood.

This tendency of women activists to take the leading role in the environmentalism of the poor is manifested in examples such as the Chipko movement in India, the Green Belt Movement in Kenya, and the opposition to the Agua Zarca Hydroelectrical Project in Honduras and is embodied in persons such as Berta Cáceres, Lesbia Urquía, Jeannette Kawas, and Margarita Murillo, all of whom fought environmental degradation in Honduras and so were assassinated.

=== Global movement ===
Political ecology scholars and environmental justice organizations are pointing toward a global environmental justice movement, led by environmental defenders from the global poor. Local movements need international support to challenge major trans-national corporations, and environmentalism of the poor would need global influence to affect global issues such as the Holocene extinction crisis and climate change.

Increasingly, local conflicts are finding international support and wider influence. For example, the struggle against the Tipaimukh Dam in India originated with poor people whose water source was being threatened, and that conflict became a dynamic and international resistance movement.

International networks such as Oilwatch have also arisen from direct action taken by Indigenous peoples fighting against oil pollution in places like the Niger Delta, Colombia, and Peru.

There has been a lack of mitigation from governments and improper oil cleanups in resource extraction sectors. Peru experienced two major oil spills in 2014 and 2022, both of which lacked sufficient media coverage or government response. Rural communities rely on river water for consumption and cleaning, but studies have revealed that the rivers are full of toxic metals and petroleum hydrocarbons.

Before Indigenous mobilization in Peru, there was little media coverage of oil spills and the water contamination of Indigenous water sources. The state-owned petroleum company, Petroperú, denied any responsibility of the 2014 oil spill, and after the 2022 spill the government declared a state of emergency but took no actions to fix the problem. Given the lack of action from the state, the responsibility fell onto the locals, who were able to attract media attention to the issue, and global NGOs and humanitarian assistance organizations called for Petroperú to be held accountable.

== Conflicts and alliances with other forms of environmentalism ==
Although there are some clear differences, the 'gospel of eco-efficiency', the 'cult of wilderness', and the 'environmentalism' of the poor overlap and intertwine in certain topics, and can form alliances. In the words of Martínez Alier, they have a lot in common, and all three are opposed by anti-environmentalists or despised or neglected by them, and in the Global South they are even attacked and killed.

=== The 'environmentalism of the poor' and the 'cult of wilderness' ===
The 'cult of wilderness' historically took a pragmatic approach and engaged in protecting natural, 'pristine' areas of wilderness from human activity by banning or at least regulating human activity in the area, creating nature reserves or national parks. The basic assumption was that human activity as a whole was prejudicial to the environment. Therefore, some currents within this movement tended to see human population as the core cause of environmental destruction.

Thus, the 'cult of wilderness' has historically been elitist and racist. For example, poor people or Indigenous people are deemed ignorant and incapable of respecting the environment; therefore, they are sometimes banned from accessing it. In multiple cases, they are even expelled from the lands they inhabited, to create natural reserves (see, for example, the case of the Kruger National Park, the case of Batwa people being expelled from the Kahuzi-Biéga National Park by WWF-trained guards, or the case of Indigenous Indians being expelled from their communal forests by governmental policy).

However, poor and Indigenous people are not ignorant, and in fact are much more conscious of the necessity of biodiversity and the environment as a positive asset worthy of conservation. Over time, they have learned its value because their livelihoods depend on it. For example, poor farmers are often interested in preserving the environment and the soil because they know it is crucial for their material livelihood. In addition, Indigenous people often want to preserve the value of the environment because they have spiritual connections with it, which is also crucial for their livelihood.

Here lies the possibility of an alliance. Recent studies have shown that Indigenous people are effective conservators of the majority of biodiversity on the planet: therefore, protecting them is also a way to manage biodiversity. For example, Indigenous people in Brazil have demonstrated to play a key role in avoiding deforestation in the Amazon rainforest. In Canada, Indigenous-led fire stewardship enhances ecosystem diversity, assists with the management of complex resources, and reduces wildfire risk by lessening fuel loads. Often Indigenous people are better managers of the biodiversity than private companies or than the State itself.

Thus, an alliance between conservationists and poor environmentalists could lead to an effective protection and management of wilderness. Conservationists have begun to understand that 'poor people' will defend wilderness if they consider it as part of their livelihood. Conservationists are beginning to understand that nature should be protected by protecting its protectors.

=== The 'gospel of eco-efficiency' and the 'environmentalism of the poor' ===
While the environmentalism of the poor focuses on protecting livelihoods, the gospel of eco-efficiency focuses on optimizing the use of resources. The ideological basis for the gospel comes from an economistic view of nature and resources. Traditionally, the gospel has not been used to protect people's livelihoods, but rather to protect economic production and prolong it by making it more sustainable; they sought to optimize resources use not to preserve them, but to be able to keep exploiting them for a longer period. Furthermore, sometimes the 'gospel of ecoefficiency' has been the main cause of ecological distribution conflicts. For example:

- The south of Catalonia has been affected by a large concentration of solar and eolic energy macroprojects that, according to the Platform Against the Concentration of Wind Turbines, has endangered the natural environment and has negative consequences for people's health. They demand an energetic transition that puts its benefits in the hands of the people instead of in the hands of corporate businesses.
- In Montcada i Reixac (Catalonia) a large cement factory managed by Lafarge-Holcim shifted from burning coal to burning waste. This change was justified by its promoters as a form of preserving fossil fuels, reducing emissions associated with coal, and as a form of reducing the amount of waste thrown away. However, this caused the factory to become more polluting than before, since the burning of waste produces toxic particles that affects the entire Montcada i Reixac. This negative impact on people's livelihood added itself to the list of negative impacts that the factory already had prior to shifting to burning waste (noise pollution, emission of particles of cement, etc.). The Montcada i Reixac Anti-Incineration Platform "Montcada Aire Net" has since opposed this, organizing people to protect their livelihoods.
- In Europe, the Common Agricultural Policy implemented by the European Union had the objective of making agricultural production more efficient by optimizing its processes to maximize its production. It included a shift from extensive to intensive agriculture, benefiting mainly large landowners. As large monocultures managed with high-tech substituted smaller crops managed with low-tech, the environmental impacts associated also augmented. Widespread soil erosion and contamination, along with peasants dispossession caused by the expansion of monocultures, endangered the livelihoods of those small peasants.
- The widespread adoption of genetically modified crops (GMOs) which are publicized as the solution to food insecurity and environmental impacts by big corporations such as Bayer-Monsanto, has impacted the livelihood of smaller peasants due to genetic contamination of seeds. Crops planted with GMOs pollinate plants planted in nearby crops that do not use GMOs, allowing for the owners of the GMOs patent to claim the ownership of the genetic code of the contaminated plants, thus negatively affecting the livelihood of the peasant who had planted them. Negative effects of GMO crops are strongly opposed by environmentalism of the poor movements such as La Via Campesina

This shows that a lot of times the 'gospel' is aligned with economic interests, thus endangering people's livelihoods. However, this is not always the case: if it is not driven by the logic of maximizing benefits, an improvement in a certain production process can indeed reduce the impact of that economic activity, thus opening up space for livelihoods to develop more freely.

For example, in locations that have implemented an efficient waste management program, environmental pollution has been effectively reduced. This is an example of how the 'gospel' can, through acting on the production side, open up space for non-productive activities.

In addition, on a lot of occasions the 'gospel' can have a positive impact by acting on livelihoods side: on a lot of occasions to protect livelihoods it is necessary to optimize the use of resources that sustain that livelihood. For example:

- For example, several rural communities around the world, that did not have access to the general electricity network before, have installed solar panels in their own houses to improve their accessibility to electricity.
- Some other communities have implemented new techniques of forestry to make forestry more efficient, not to augment production, but to reduce the amount of resources that they use to sustain their livelihoods.
- Another example would be the improvements made in health. Even though it is more complicated than that because there are a lot of economic interests in the healthcare industry, a lot of the advances in health science are made to improve people's livelihoods rather than just making production more efficient. For example, health improvements in cancer treatment will have a direct positive impact in people's livelihoods.
- In Ahmedabad (India), an improvement of waste management policies opened up opportunities for informal waste pickers, which were formalized into public servants, thus improving their livelihoods while still having competitive rates of recycling.

All those positive examples have one thing in common: in them technology is not used with a logic of maximizing economic production. It is rather used as a tool for conviviality, which Ivan Illich described as those which give each person who uses them the greatest opportunity to enrich the environment with the fruits of his or her vision. Illich also wrote that industrial tools deny this possibility to those who use them and they allow their designers to determine the meaning and expectations of others. Most tools today cannot be used in a convivial fashion. In the examples given, the technology is used as a tool to improve people's livelihoods or making them more sustainable, rather than just as a tool for production.

=== The 'gospel of eco-efficiency' and the 'cult of wilderness' ===
The 'gospel of eco-efficiency' is strongly focused on the optimization of the use of resources. This can be seen either as an effort to minimize the impact of economic activities on the environment and society, or as an effort to optimize the costs of production to increase the benefit margin and increase the investment in new capital. In the first case, improving efficiency can have a positive outcome for nature, whereas in the second case, this improvement has either neutral or bad outcomes. There are examples of both cases:

- For example, due to technological improvement, electro domestics no longer needed clorfluorocarbon gases (CFC) to work, thus reducing the emission of this gas that destroys de ozone layer, thus helping to reduce the ozone hole.
- On the contrary, there is evidence that due to the Jevons paradox, the majority of improvements in the cost-efficiency of economic activity does not result in reducing the costs themselves, but in being able to produce more with the same costs.

The 'gospel of eco-efficiency' worries a lot about resources provided by natural capital and ecosystem services. In some instances, assuring those resources may involve the creation of natural areas, or even the restoration of degraded spaces. For example, forest management was born with the utilitarian objective of managing sustainably some forests to provide wood and other resources. Some Natural Parks were created with the objective of regulating human activity in natural environments to avoid depletion to ensure the availability of resources. In this case, the 'gospel of eco-efficiency' involves protecting natural areas. Another case in which the 'gospel' involves protecting nature is when the creation of some natural spaces serves as the moral scapegoat for increasing the economic activity in non-natural spaces. For instance, carbon offsetting, or ecosystem restoration by businesses have been deemed as a form of greenwashing by some of those authors.

In general, the degree of antagonism between the 'gospel of eco-efficiency' and the 'cult of wilderness' varies with the degree of conservationism and the environmental impact of an eco-efficient activity.

For instance, deep ecologists usually stand against any form of economic activity, even if it is very efficient, because they praise the untouchedness of nature and argue that any form of economic activity should be banned, even if it is eco-efficient. However, some deep ecologists are practical and argue for the creation of separated and untouched natural reserves that can coexist with forms of economic activity, thus legitimizing the 'gospel of eco-efficiency' as long as it protects pristine natural areas.

Less radical forms of conservationism argue that economic activity can coexist with natural spaces as long as this economic activity is eco-efficient. It is precisely in this context that the 'gospel of eco-efficiency' and the 'cult of wilderness' find the strongest alliance. For example, some authors argue that forest fires can be avoided by introducing extensive farming. Other authors argue that an eco-efficient industry based on nature-based solutions can coexist with conservationism. In general, less radical forms of conservationism see economic activity as something neutral as long as it does not threaten natural spaces. As Martínez Alier argues, they assert that technical change will make the production of commodities compatible with ecological sustainability, thus emphasizing the preservation of that part of Nature which is still outside the economy. In sum, they argue for sustainable development with the preservation of natural spaces.

== Examples of 'environmentalism of the poor' ==
Some examples of environmental struggles are:

- The Chipko movement
- The opposition to the Agua Zarca Dam for which the activist Berta Cáceres was assassinated.
- The Green Belt Movement led by Wangari Maathai.
- The struggles against solar and wind energy macroprojects in Southern Catalonia
- The "empates" organized by the National Council of Rubber Tappers, which, led by Chico Mendes, fought against the destruction of "seringes" (sustainably managed rubber forests). Mendes was later assassinated to halt grassroots organizing.
- The legal battle of activist Saúl Luciano Lliuya against RWE for its polluting activities.
- The neighborhood struggles in Montcada i Reixac (Catalonia) against a Lafarge-Holcim cement factory that burns waste as a source of energy, and which causes toxic pollution and noise pollution.
- The Great Sioux War of 1876, in which the Sioux fought for the preservation of their sacred mountains, the Black Hills
- The struggle against the Fenix Nickel Project in Guatemala
- The Cochabamba Water War in Bolivia
- The struggle to protect a water body in Llinars del Vallès (Catalonia) from being built on by private developers. The struggle involved a resistance camp in the place, and ended up in the local government protecting the water.
- The struggle against the privatization of water in Sainte-Soline (France) involved 30.000 people clashing with the police.
- Residents and activists in Memphis, Tennessee have expressed concern about Elon Musk's xAI's supercomputer, which raised concerns about pollution from the number of methane generators being used without permits.
