= Environmental Justice Atlas =

Nonprofit website

- Founded: 2012
- Country of origin: Spain
- Area served: Global
- Owner: EnvJustice Project
- Founders: Leah Temper, Daniela Del Bene, Joan Martínez-Alier.
- Services: Environmental Justice
- Website: ejatlas.org
- Commercial: No

The Environmental Justice Atlas, sometimes known as EJAtlas is a website that documents environmental conflict.

The website was published by Environmental Justice Organisations, Liability and Trade (Ejolt) and moderated by the Autonomous University of Barcelona. Management of the website is done by university staff Leah Temper, Daniela Del Bene and Joan Martínez-Alier. The project was launched in 2012. As of 2019, it was managed by the EnvJustice Project.

As of 2018, the website documented approximately 2,500 conflicts and enables users to filter conflicts using over 100 fields. While the website continues to be actively maintained by a range of collaborators including from academia and NGOs, and in early 2024 contained over 4,000 conflicts, with conflicts tracked across 10 broad environmental conflict categories.
