= Joan Martinez Alier =

Catalan economist (born 1939)

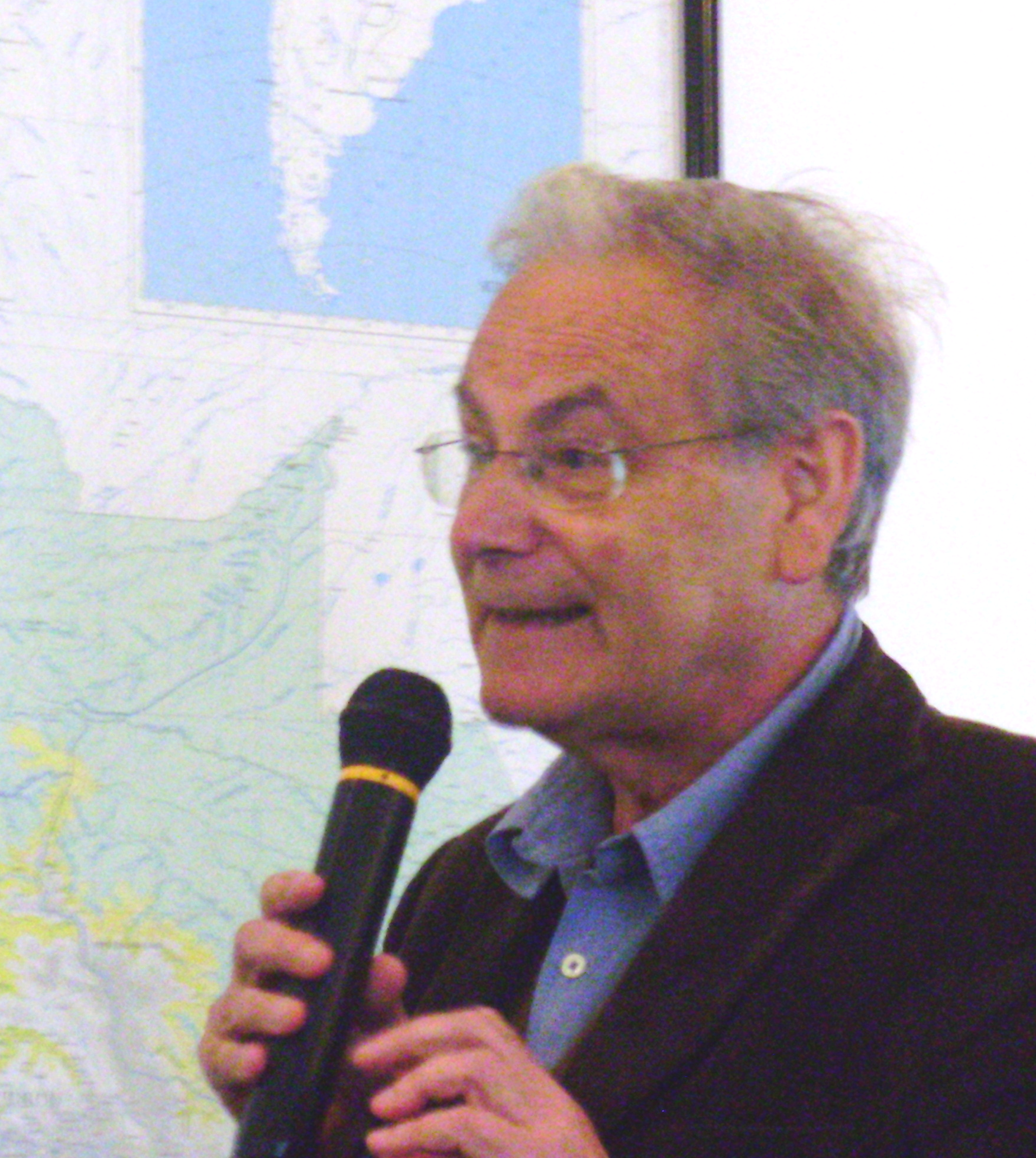
Joan Martinez Alier

Joan Martinez Alier (born 1939, Barcelona, Spain) is a Spanish economist, Emeritus Professor of Economics and Economic History and researcher at ICTA at the Autonomous University of Barcelona. He has made important contributions in ecological economics and political ecology, which he synthesised in his work on environmentalism of the poor.

== Biography ==
Martinez Alier has a Lic. Economics, Universitat de Barcelona (1961), after which he went abroad to escape Francoist Spain, and studied agricultural economics at Oxford University and Stanford. He then received a scholarship to return to Oxford (B.Litt. St Antony's College, 1967). His PhD was in Economics from the Universitat Autonoma de Barcelona (1976). He cooperated with the exile publishing house Ruedo Iberico in Paris between 1966 and 1979.

He remained as a researcher at St Antony's College, Oxford into the early 1970s (1966–73 and 1984–85), working on agrarian conflicts, land reform, rural unemployment and the capitalist logic of sharecropping in Southern Spain and also conducting research in Cuba (on smallholders in the early years of Castro's administration); and in Peru (on the hacienda peasantry). He was visiting professor at the State University of Campinas (Brasil) in 1974, before returning to his home town to join the Department of Economics and Economic History at the Universitat Autònoma de Barcelona in Spain, in 1975. He has also been a visitor at the Free University of Berlin (1980–81), Stanford University, the University of California, Davis (1988–89), Yale University (1999-2001), and FLACSO Sede-Ecuador (1994–95 and 2007–15).

He directed the CEECEC and EJOLT research projects on ecological economics and political ecology between 2008 and 2015. He is officially retired from AUB, but still professionally active and in 2016, aged in his mid-70s, he received a €2 million Advanced Grant from the European Research Council (ERC) for a further five-year project: A Global Environmental Justice Movement - The EJAtlas.

He is a founding member and past president of the International Society for Ecological Economics. He was a member (2000–08) of the European Environment Agency Scientific Committee.

== Contributions ==
Martinez Alier's interests are agrarian studies, ecological economics and political ecology. In the late seventies Martinez Alier became interested in agricultural energetics and the work of Sergei Podolinsky (1850-1891), publishing a text on this with J.M. Naredo in 1982. He has also described and mapped the anti-extractivist Blockadia movement.

He has defined many of the key concepts and approaches in ecological economics. He argues, against neoclassical economists, that the economy is not circular, but entropic. Calculations of social metabolic flows of energy and materials need to figure in neoclassical and marxist economics. Energy is not recycled and materials are only partially recycled - and resource extraction and waste disposal manifest themselves in ecological systems. They are visible through the drawing down of physical resources, pollution, and through socio-ecological distribution conflicts. The latter are hastened by an increase in social metabolism and human appropriation of nature. "In environmental struggles, reproduction of human society and of nature's functions are more important or just as important as fights over the (purported) economic surplus."

== Recognition ==
- ISEE Kenneth Boulding Award for Ecological Economics, 2010
- Leontief Prize for Advancing the Frontiers of Economic Thought, GDAE, 2017
- Balzan Prize for Environmental Challenges: Responses from the Social Sciences and the Humanities. 2020. For his exceptional contributions to the foundation of ecological economics, his pathbreaking analysis of the relationships between economies and the environment, his interdisciplinary as well as comparative approach, and his active role in the promotion of environmental justice.
- Holberg Prize 2023. The 2023 Holberg prize is awarded to Spanish scholar Joan Martinez-Alier for his ground-breaking research in ecological economics, political ecology and environmental justice.
- Festshrift volume. Villamayor-Tomas, S. & Muradian, R. (eds.). 2023. The Barcelona School of Ecological Economics and Political Ecology: A Companion in Honour of Joan Martinez-Alier. Springer Open Access. https://doi.org/10.1007/978-3-031-22566-6

== Selected books (in English) ==
- 1971: Labourers and Landowners in Southern Spain
- 1977: Haciendas, Plantations and Collective Farms (Cuba and Peru)
- 1987: Ecological economics: Energy, environment and society
- 1994: The environment as a luxury good or "too poor to be green"?
- 1996: Getting down to earth: practical applications of ecological economics (with Robert Costanza and Olman Segura)
- 1997: Varieties of Environmentalism. Essays North and South (with Ramachandra Guha)
- 2002: The Environmentalism of the Poor: A Study of Ecological Conflicts and Valuation
- 2007: Rethinking Environmental History: World-Systems History and Global Environmental Change (with Alf Hornborg and John Mc Neill)
- 2008: Recent Developments in Ecological Economics 2 vols. (with Inge Ropke)
- 2012: Ecological Economics from the Ground Up (with Hali Healy et al.)
- 2015: Handbook of Ecological Economics (with Roldan Muradian)
- 2023: Land, Water, Air and Freedom. The Making of World Movements for Environmental Justice, open access, https://www.elgaronline.com/monobook-oa/book/9781035312771/9781035312771.xml

== Interviews (in English) ==
- Interview with Lorenzo Pellegrini in Development & Change, 2012
- Ecological Economics, Video Interview at The Montreal Degrowth Conference 2012
- ESEE Interview 2023.
- Leontief-prize/recipients
