= La Unión, Huánuco =

La Unión Aguamiro
- Village
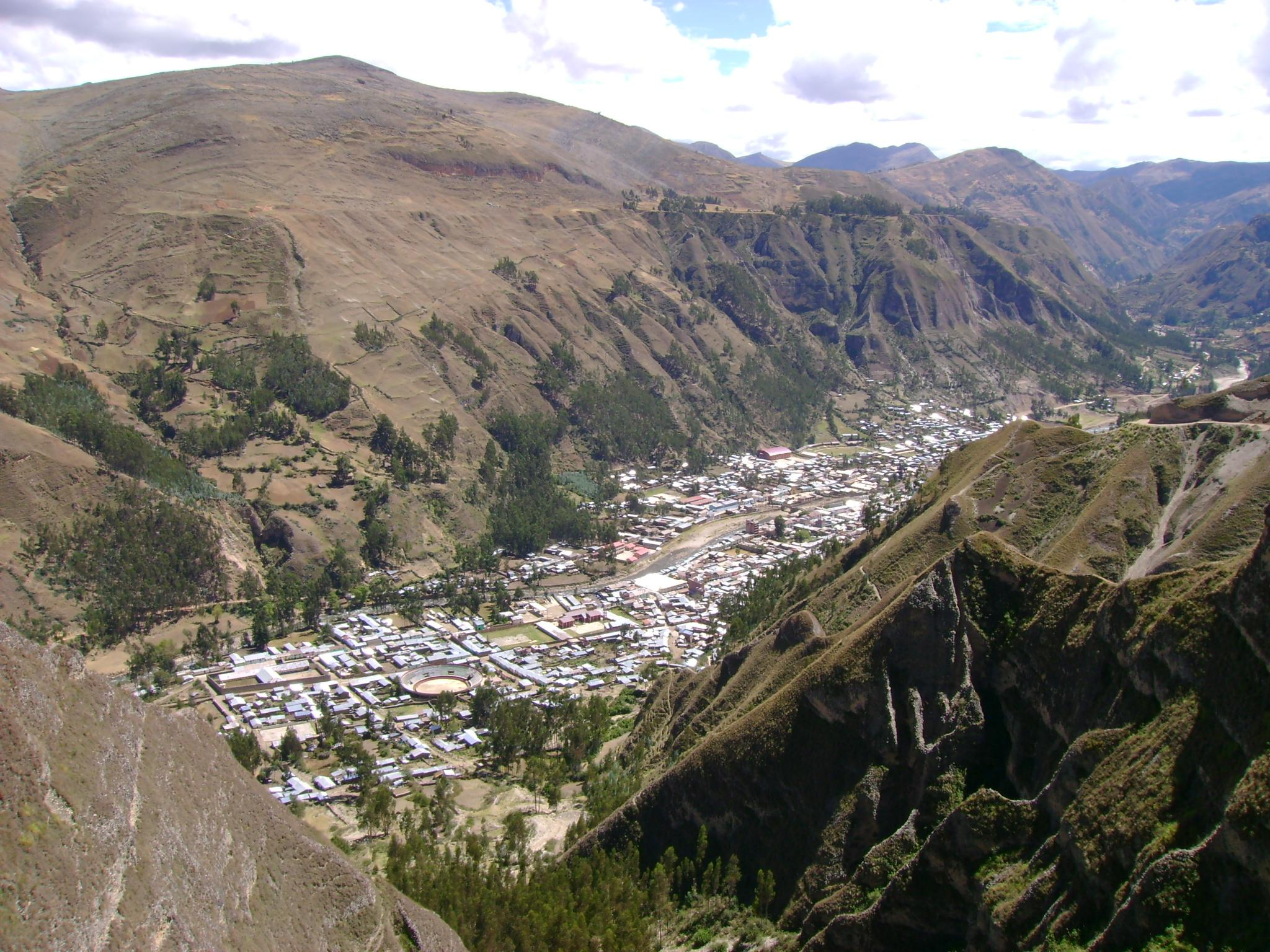
- La Unión from Gangash.

- Location within Peru
- Coordinates: 9°46′S 76°47′W
- Country: Peru
- Region: Huánuco
- Province: Dos de Mayo
- District: La Unión

Government
  - Mayor: Luis Maldonado Rivera
- Elevation: 3,204 m (10,512 ft)

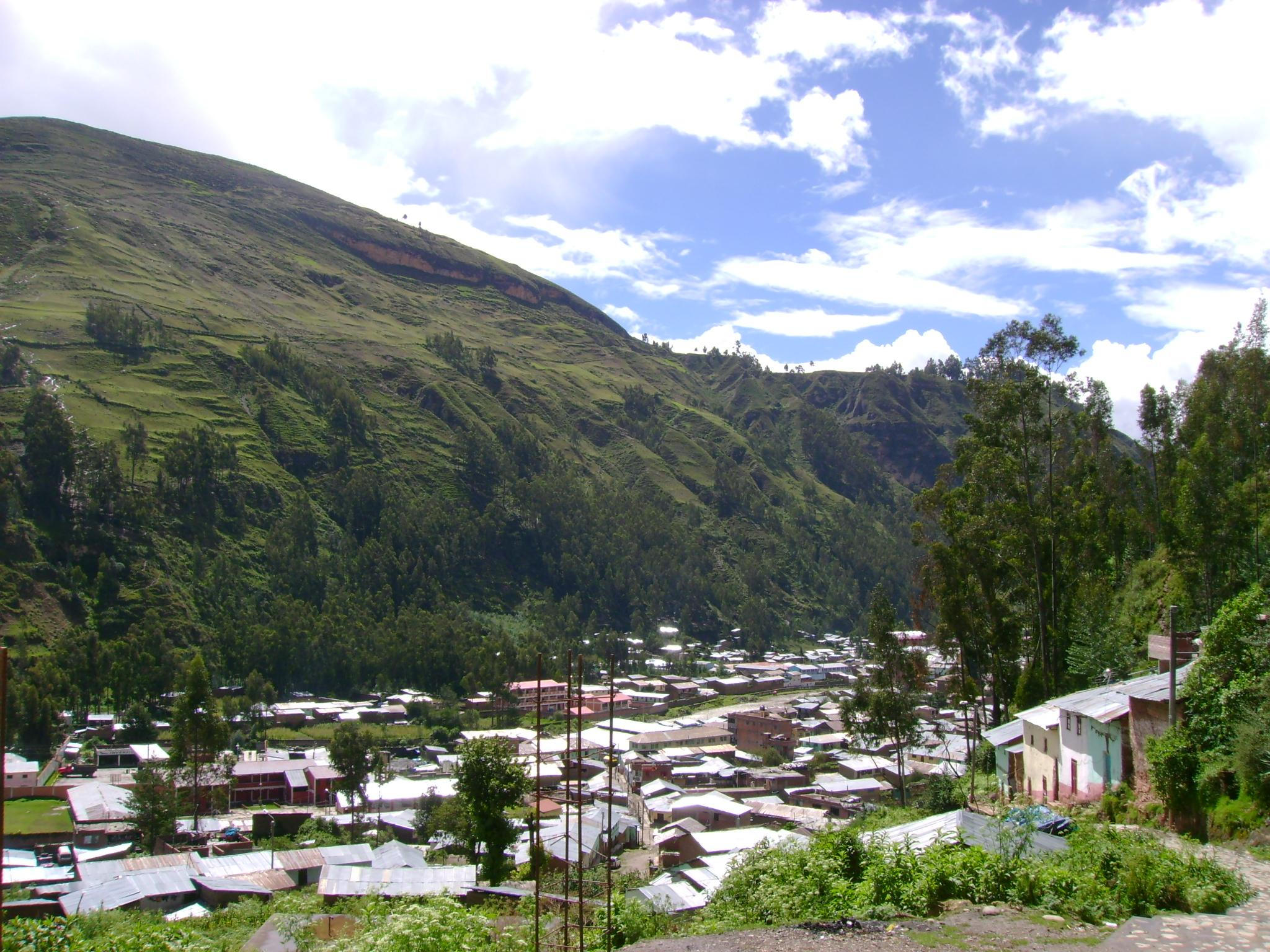
La Unión from noon to late.

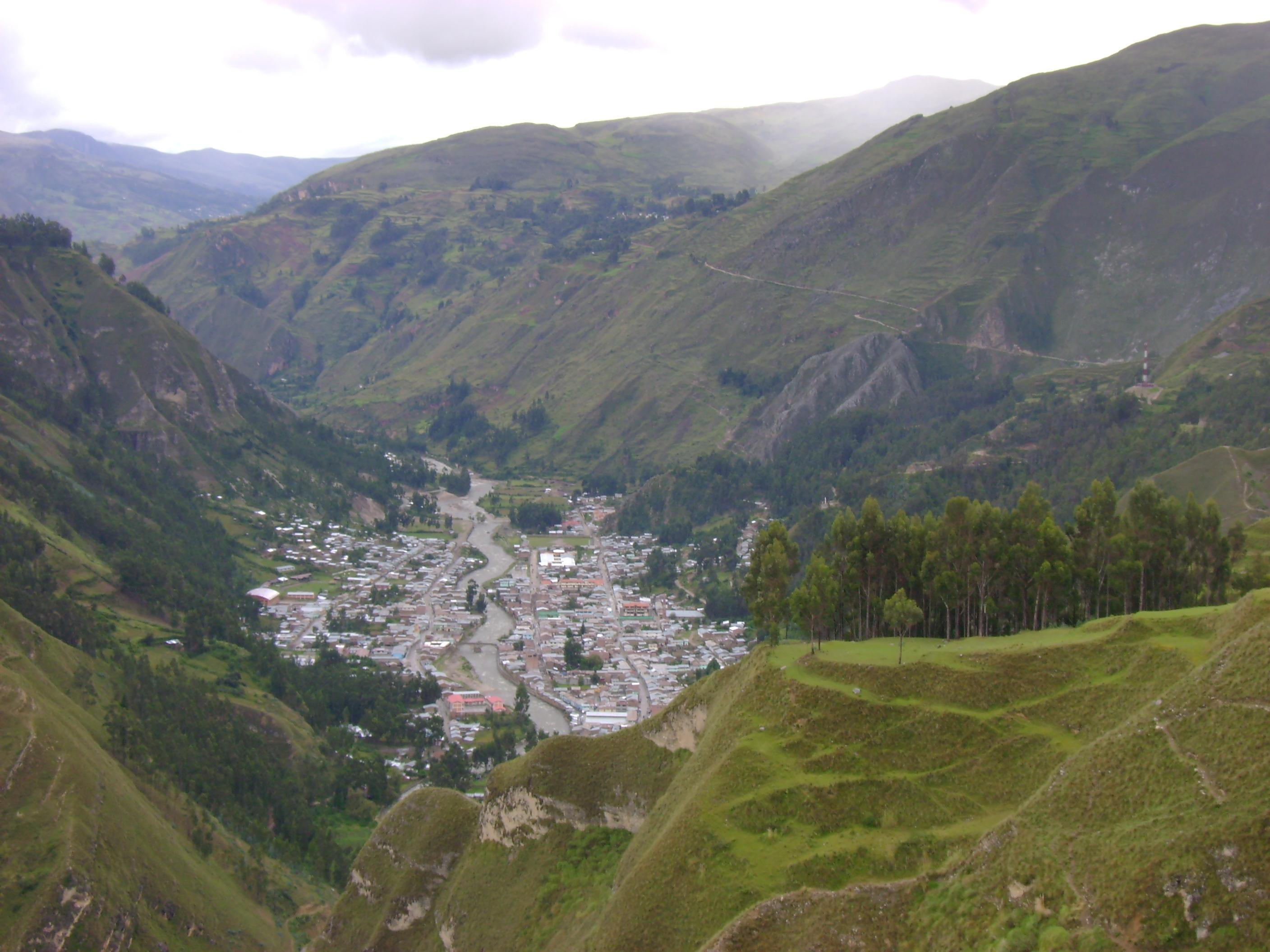
La Unión from the edge of Huánuco Pampa, right the new antenna Movistar.

La Unión is a town in central Peru, capital of the province Dos de Mayo in the region Huánuco. The city lies over the Vizcarra River and is divided between two of the nine districts of the province, La Unión on the right bank and Ripán on the left bank. It has a regional hospital. Close to the city, over a flat highland or meseta (12,000 feet over sea level) is the old famed Inca city called Wanuku Pampa, Wanuku Marka or Wanuku Viejo. The most important festival is by the end of July and it is called "La Fiesta del Sol".

During the Inca period, the town saw the relocation of the mitmakuna, later referred to as mitimaes by the Spanish, under the state’s policy of population resettlement. Named Aguamiro (Quechua for textile factory) for its association with textiles, these relocated groups became part of the resource and production network of the provincial capital of Wanuko. This focus on textiles persisted into the colonial era, when the town became a center for obrajes.

After independence, the growth and conurbation of Aguamiro with Ripán (Quechua ripa, meaning small, with the possessive/affirming suffix -n) led to the city being renamed La Unión by law on February 5, 1875, symbolizing their union. However, Aguamiro and Ripán maintain administrative independence within their respective districts. Today, Aguamiro (La Unión) is the seat of government for the La Unión district, while Ripán serves as the capital of its own namesake district.

== Geography ==
=== Location ===
The coordinates are: 9°49′4.48″S 76°48′04.73″W.

It occupies an area of the Urqumayu valley which serves as a boundary with the Ripán District, with which it communicates by two bridges, at an altitude of 3204 m, corresponding to the region Quechua, according to Javier Pulgar Vidal in his classification of eight natural regions of Peru. The closeness of the valley gives a configuration elongated north–south, bounded on the east by the plateau of Wanuku Pampa and the hill Pallqa, on the west by the foothills of the upper valley, where villages are located Anchacgrande, Quchapampa and Liriopampa in the Ripán District. Because of the proximity to the town Rípan (just one of the only cross two bridges), often in both villages is mentioned with the name of La Unión, sometimes called La Unión – Rípan.

The two bridges that cross the river, have different characteristics:

- The first bridge made of stone masonry bridge called Cáceres, only used for pedestrian and bicycle traffic.
- The second made of steel and wood (floor of the bridge), called the Union bridge, if used for motorized transport (buses, trucks, etc.) and pedestrian.

Due to its location the city is the access point to other locations in the provinces bordering Dos de Mayo, like Llata, Chavinillo, Huánuco, Rondos, etc. as well as with the other districts of the province: Sillapata, Pachas, Yanas, Marias, etc. Including Wallanka to Huaraz or Chiquián in the region Ancash, in terms of road has the characteristic of being a central city.

=== Hydrography ===
The river Urqumayu crosses the city from south to north and for being a tributary of the river Marañón, the village is located in the area of Huanuco territory belonging to the catchment of the second.

=== Climate ===
Because of its altitude, the climate is temperate. In the months from November to April is the season of summer, the rainy season, and in the remaining months (May to September) the dry season (drought) or winter, which is best time to visit the village.

During the summer, torrential rains are frequent and occasionally occur hailstorm and in the months of winter insolation is strong and the high temperature range with high temperatures during the day, which descend well below the average for night, as well as between the lit and shadow areas, due to low humidity.

== Infrastructure and Services ==
It has electric lighting, water and sewer service. In telecommunications and Internet service coverage through the operator Claro and Movistar recently.

== Roads and Transportation ==
It comes through the route through the Panamericana north from Lima to Paramonga, then a turn northeast to Chaskitampu, Cajacay, Qunuqucha and Wallanka, at night, the road is paved only until Wallanka, from there to La Unión the track is a path in the extension project. In this section you will find a narrow, low semitunel height Huajtahuaro called, also known as The cave cat because of a local legend, which is a challenge for drivers of buses that arrive and leave the village.

During daylight hours Qunuqucha understood from Chiquián, Aquia, and Wallanka Raqrachakra. In this turn the road from the plateau Qunuqucha Raqrachakra is going to trail (unpaved or state), the rest of the way is paved as mentioned above.

In both turns to reach Wallanka from Pachapaki, located at the foot of the Wallanka mountain range should cross the mountain range above, through the opening of Yanashallash.

=== Transport Companies ===
- Tourism Cavassa
- Tourism Armonia
- Royal Bus
- Estrella Polar

=== Road Map ===
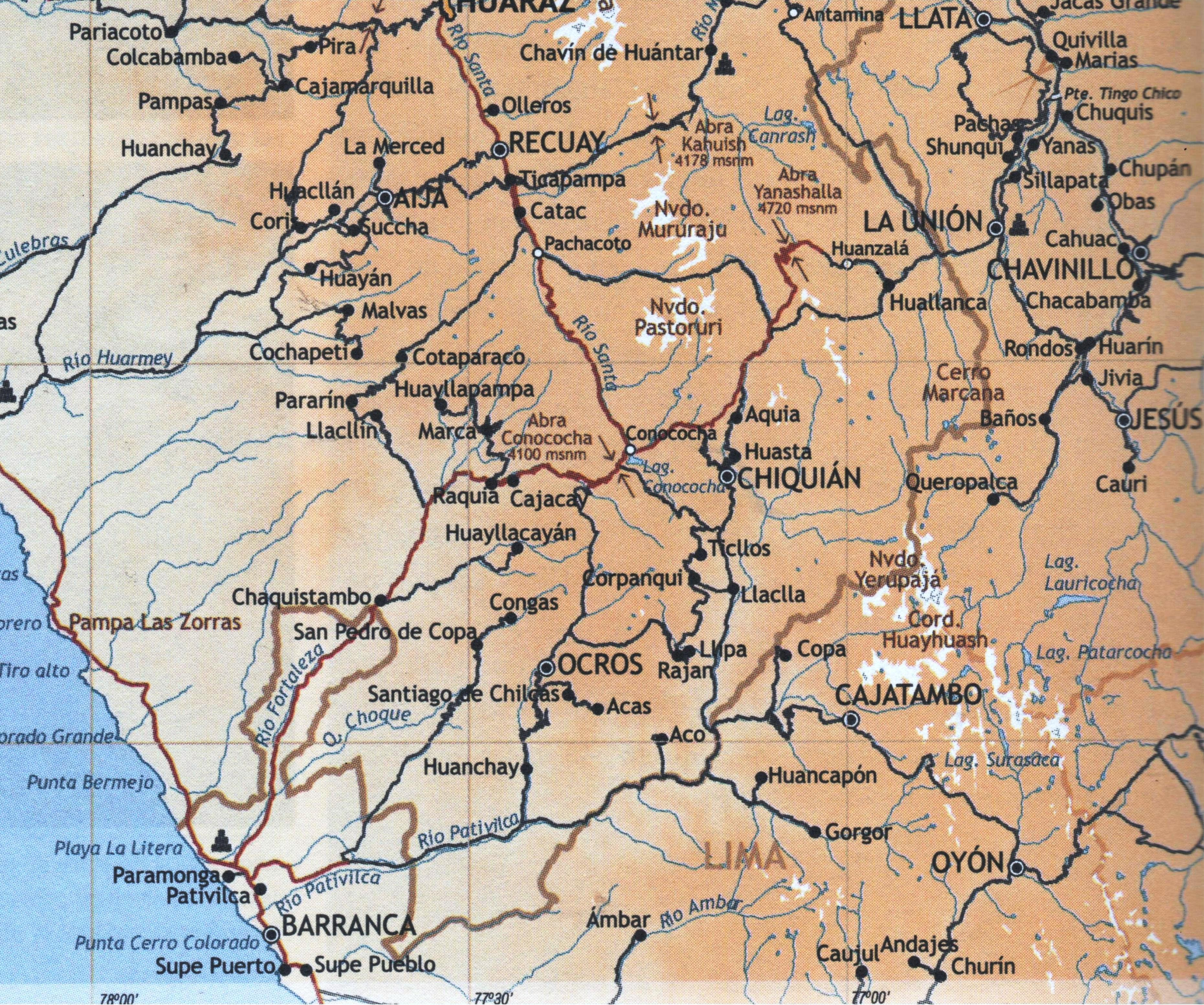
Road Map of La Union, from Paramonga, see Chaskitampu, Raquia, Cajacay, Qunuqucha, Chiquián, Aquia, Wansala and Wallanka.

The map shows the road to La Union, from the town of Paramunqa adjacent portions of the regions of Ancash, Huanuco and Lima.

== Economic Activities ==
For its geographical location and being the provincial capital, the main economic activity is the trade, catering to the surrounding areas of products that the province can not produce arriving from other cities from Lima and Huanuco, such as fruit, appliances, etc.. Other activities that are linked to above are the agriculture, the livestock and making clothes and costumes for everyday and holidays. And finally, to a lesser extent but are increasing the tourism.

It has a central market.

== Tourism ==
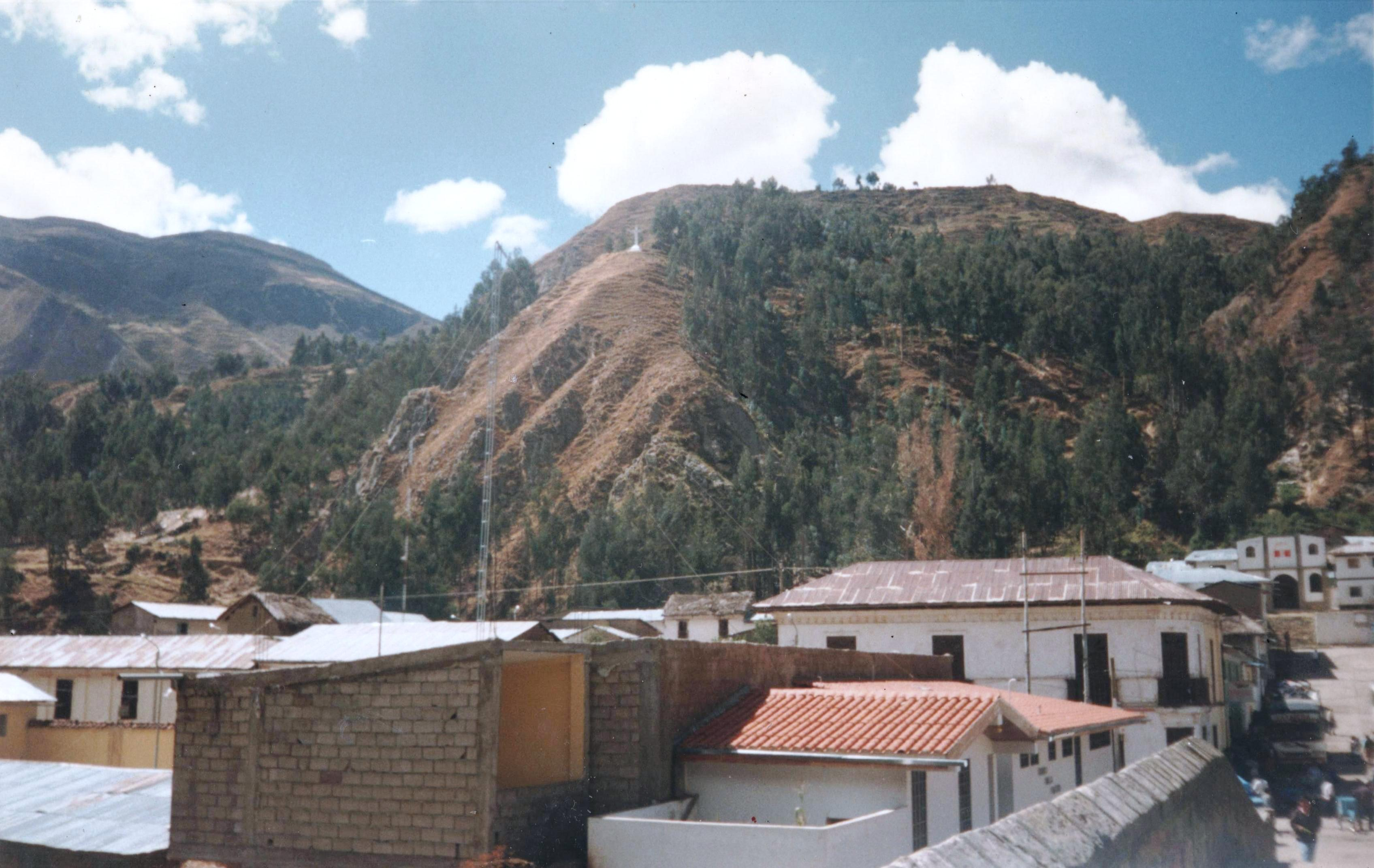
Cerro San Cristobal – La Union in the summer of August 1997

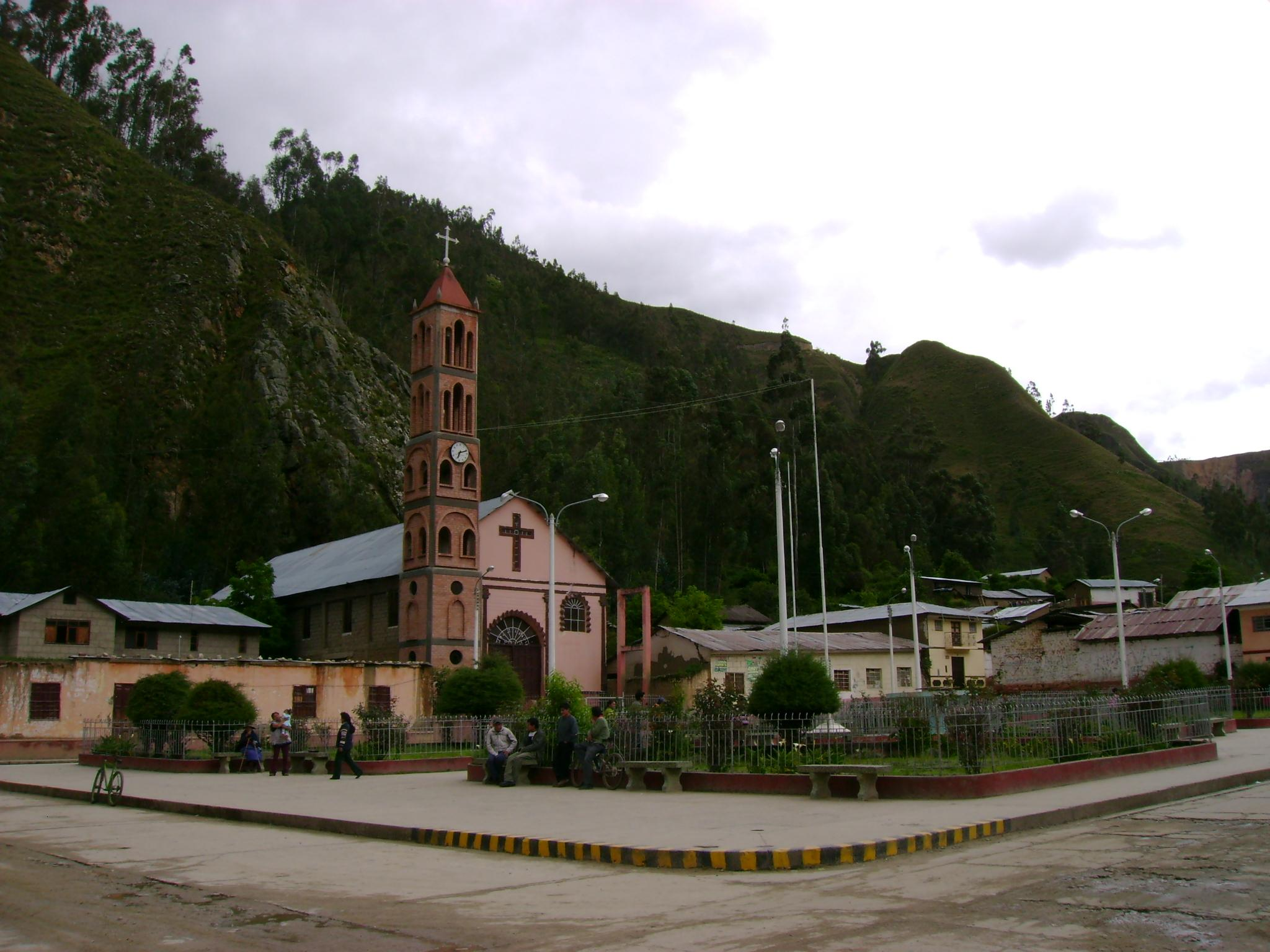
Previous Plaza de Armas

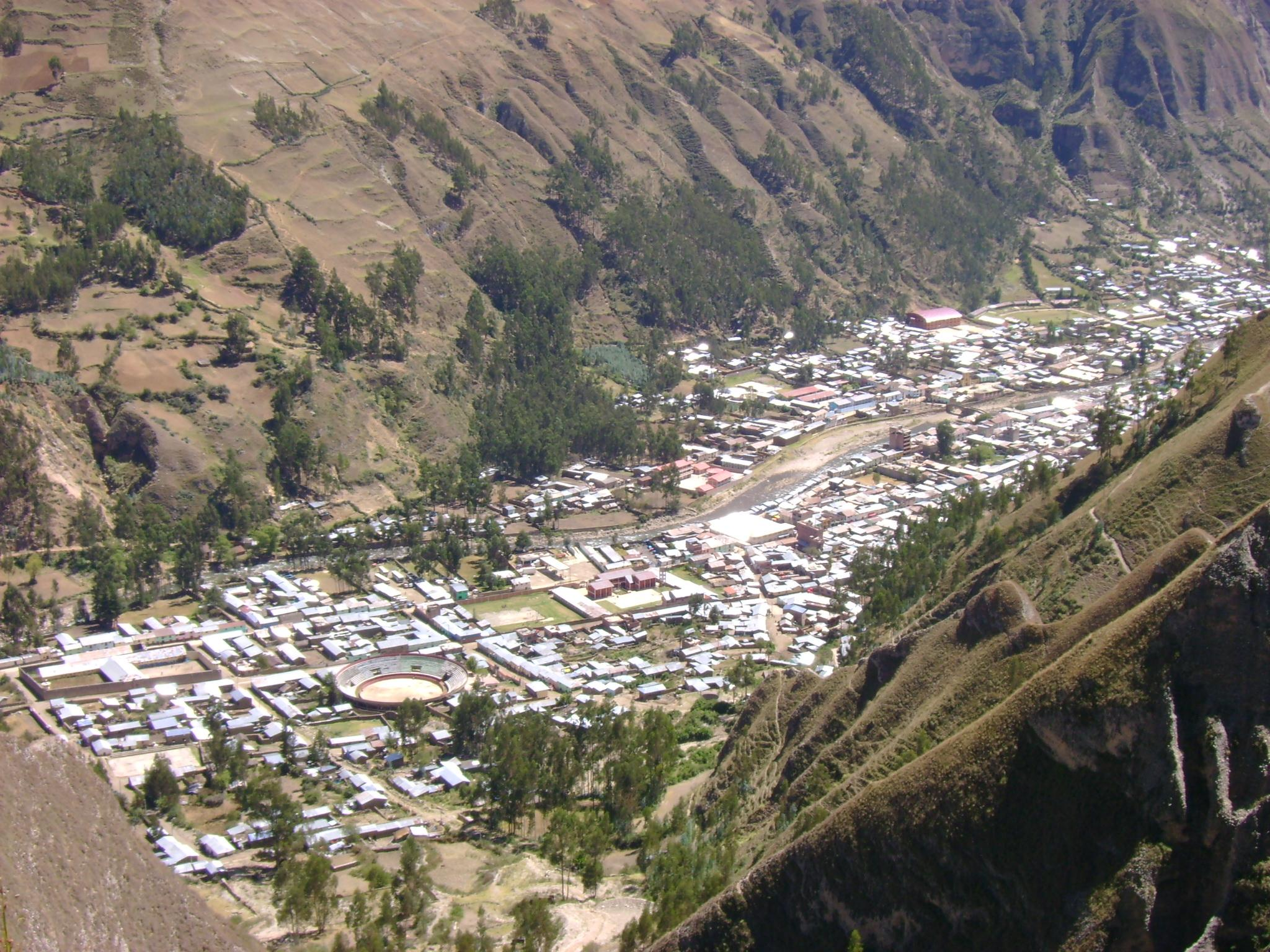
La Unión from Gangash

There are inns and restaurants for tourists' attention. Because of its altitude and location in the valley enjoys a temperate dry climate which makes it ideal to visit people with respiratory diseases, and the aroma of the environment to the sky, silence and stillness.

Is the starting point for access to the Inca ruins of Wanuku Pampa which is accessed via a dirt road, Huanuco Pampa Union or walk up through the valley of Markaraqra, also at different locations of the provinces of Lauricocha, Ambo, Huánuco, Yarowilca and Huamalies, as mentioned above. You can also reach the thermal baths of Quñuq, located at 2 km of La Unión in the district Rípan.

From the viewpoint atop Cerro San Cristobal can panoramic views of the city from where one can get panoramic view of the town and part of the valley Vizcarra is from hill Gangash located in Wanuku Pampa near and at the top of the ravine Markaraqra and also from one edge of a ravine on the plateau that marks the edge of the canyon, near Gangash.

== Notable people ==
- Augusto Cárdich
