= La Unión =

La Union or La Unión (in Spanish for The Union) may refer to:

== Places ==
=== Argentina ===
- La Unión, Buenos Aires
- La Unión, Salta

=== Chile ===
- La Unión, Chile

=== Colombia ===
- La Unión, Antioquia
- La Unión, Nariño
- La Unión, Sucre
- La Unión, Valle del Cauca

=== Costa Rica ===
- La Unión Canton

=== Cuba ===
- La Unión, Cienfuegos

=== El Salvador ===
- La Unión Department
- La Unión, El Salvador

=== Honduras ===
- La Unión, Copán
- La Unión, Olancho

=== Mexico ===
- La Unión, Guerrero
- La Unión, Quintana Roo

=== Peru ===
- La Unión Province, Peru
- La Unión District, Dos de Mayo, district of the Dos de Mayo province in Huánuco
- La Unión District, Piura, district of the Piura province in Piura
- La Unión District, Tarma, district of the Tarma province in Junín
- La Unión, Huánuco, capital of the Dos de Mayo province in Huánuco

=== Philippines ===
- La Union, Ilocos Region, Philippines

=== Spain ===
- La Unión, Murcia

=== United States ===
- La Union, New Mexico

== Other uses ==
- La Unión (ship), a ship used to traffick enslaved Mayans from Mexico to Cuba from 1855 to 1861
- La Unión (band), a Spanish pop/rock band

== See also ==
- Unión (disambiguation)
- Union (disambiguation)
