= La Unión, Honduras =

La Unión, Honduras may refer to:

- La Unión, Atlántida - a village in the department of Atlántida in Honduras
- La Unión, Copán - a municipality in the department of Copán in Honduras
- La Unión, Lempira - a municipality in the department of Lempira in Honduras
- La Unión, Olancho - a municipality in the department of Olancho in Honduras

== See also ==
- La Unión (disambiguation)
