= Puka Hirka (Huánuco) =

Mountain in Peru

- Location within Peru

Highest point
- Elevation: 4,000 m (13,000 ft)
- Coordinates: 9°35′16″S 76°28′24″W

Geography
- Location: Huánuco Region
- Parent range: Andes

Puka Hirka (Quechua puka red, hirka mountain, "red mountain", also spelled Pucajirca) is a mountain in the Andes of Peru which reaches a height of approximately 4,000 m (13,000 ft). It is located in the Huánuco Region, Dos de Mayo Province, Marías District. Puka Hirka lies northeast of Saqra Waqra.
