= Wayta Hirka Punta =

Mountain in Peru

- Location within Peru

Highest point
- Elevation: 4,400 m (14,400 ft)
- Coordinates: 9°38′53″S 76°28′25″W

Geography
- Location: Huánuco Region
- Parent range: Andes

Wayta Hirka Punta (Quechua wayta crest; wild flower; the whistling of the wind, Ancash Quechua hirka mountain, punta peak; ridge; first, before, in front of, also spelled Huayta Jirca Punta) is a mountain in the Andes of Peru which reaches a height of approximately 4,400 m (14,400 ft). It is located in the Huánuco Region, Dos de Mayo Province, Marías District. Wayta Hirka Punta lies south of Tikti Punta and southeast of a lake named Saqsaqucha ("multi-colored lake").
