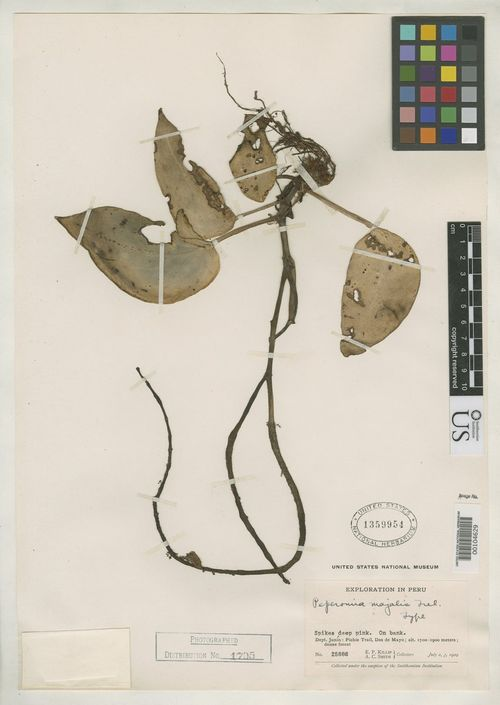

Scientific classification
- Kingdom: Plantae
- Clade: Tracheophytes
- Clade: Angiosperms
- Clade: Magnoliids
- Order: Piperales
- Family: Piperaceae
- Genus: Peperomia
- Species: P. majalis

Binomial name
- Peperomia majalis Trel.

= Peperomia majalis =

Species of plant

Peperomia majalis is a species of epiphytic herb in the genus Peperomia that is endemic to Peru. It grows on wet tropical biomes. Its conservation status is Threatened.

== Description ==
The type specimen were collected at near Dos de Mayo, Peru at an altitude of 1700-1900 meters above sea level.

Peperomia majalis is a medium-sized, tree-dwelling herb that is glabrous except for the ciliate leaf margins. The stem is 4 mm thick with short internodes. The alternate leaves are elliptic or typically ovate, somewhat acute, with a rounded to shortly cordate base, and are peltate near the base. They measure 6–10 cm long and 3.5–6.5 cm wide, with slender, multiple pinnate nerves. When dry, they are yellowish-brown and leathery. The petiole is 2–4 cm long. The terminal spikes are borne in pairs at the apex of a 1-bracteate branchlet. They are 40 mm long and 2 mm thick, with a 1 cm peduncle.

== Taxonomy and naming ==
It was described in 1936 by William Trelease in Publications of the Field Museum of Natural History, Botanical Series 13, from specimens collected by Ellsworth Paine Killip & Albert Charles Smith.

The epithet is derived from the Latin for "of May," referring to the type locality.

== Distribution and habitat ==
It is native to Peru. It grows as an epiphytic herb. It grows on wet tropical biomes.

== Conservation ==
This species is assessed as Threatened, in a preliminary report.
