= Quriqucha (Huánuco) =

Mountain in Peru

- Location within Peru

Highest point
- Elevation: 4,600 m (15,100 ft)
- Coordinates: 9°34′25″S 76°34′38″W

Geography
- Location: Huánuco Region
- Parent range: Andes

Quriqucha (Quechua quri gold, qucha lake, "gold lake", also spelled Joricocha) is a mountain at a small lake of that name in the Andes of Peru which reaches a height of approximately 4,600 m (15,100 ft). It is located in the Huánuco Region, Dos de Mayo Province, Marías District.

The lake named Quriqucha lies south of the peak at 9°34′53″S 76°34′32″W.
