= Huánuco Pampa =

Archaeological site in Peru

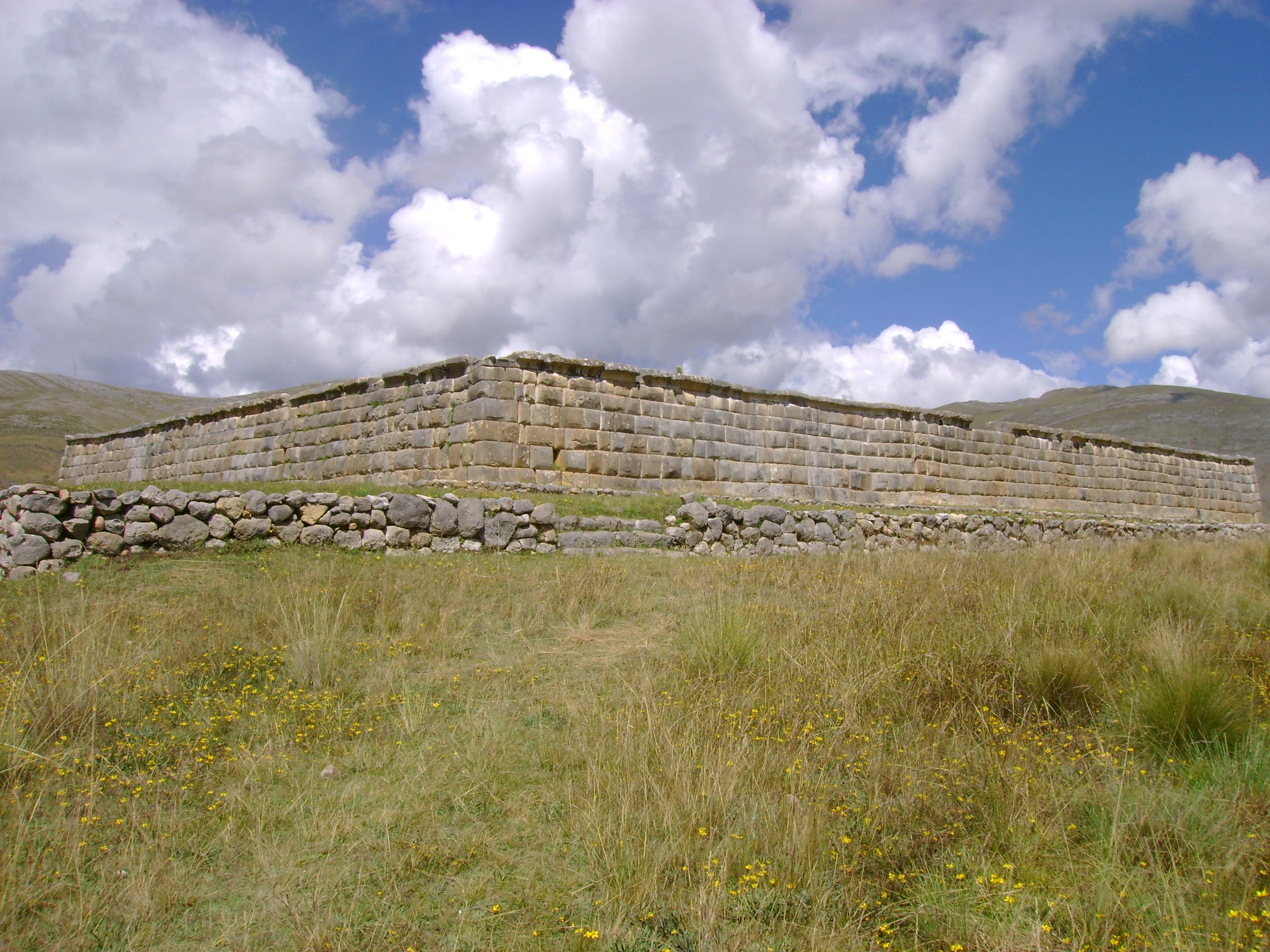
- Quadrangular walls of the Ushnu.

- Location within Peru
- 9°52′27″S 76°48′57″W
- Location: La Unión District, Dos de Mayo Province, Huánuco
- Region: Andes

Huánuco Pampa, Huánuco Marka (also spelled Huánuco Marca) or Huánuco Viejo, Wanako Pampa, Wanuku Pampa or simply Huánuco is a large archaeological site in Peru in the Huánuco Region, Dos de Mayo Province, La Unión District. The ruins of the city lie on a plateau above the Urqumayu or Vizcarra River in the central Andes. The Incas administered their large empire through a small number of administrative centers, such as Huánuco Pampa. The administrative centers were linked by the extensive Inca road system. The most important of the roads, the Qhapaq Ñan, which ran from Cusco to Quito, passed through Huánuco Pampa. The Inca authorities in Huánuco ruled at least five, and perhaps more, ethnic groups. The city is situated on an important commercial trade route and sits on top of a plateau with ravines on all sides in order to allow easy defense of the city. During the Spanish conquest of the Incas, Huánuco Pampa was briefly occupied by Gomez de Alvarado, who founded a Spanish city but it was quickly moved to Pillco because of the harsh climate of Huánuco and the raids of Illa Tupac, one of the captains of Manco Inca.

== Site Layout and Architecture ==
Huánuco Pampa is located at an elevation of 3,625 metres (11,893 ft) on a plateau overlooking the Vizcarra River.

This Inca center was designed after what is called the Architecture of Power, the concept where buildings and spaces are intended to reinforce the image of the empire's might. At Huánuco Pampa the immense rectangular plaza measured 550m by 350m which is more than 19 hectares (47 acres). The pyramidal platform that was invariably erected in the center of the plaza or to one side of it was a stage from which officials could preside over state ceremonies. The imperial highway typically took a southeast-to-northwest passage through the plaza, just as it did in Cusco. The central plaza of Huánuco Pampa created canals which could transport water into different architectures, baths and then into a pool and further reach a larger pool that reached 65x35m.

The city covered about 2 km^{2}, within which more than 4,000 buildings were erected. Pathways radiate out through architectural sectors from the plaza, so that the city can easily be divided up to 12 parts. Dr. Eduard Craig Morris believes that this design may have been a reflection of the relationships among the ethnic groups of the area. Much of the occupants of the land were not there to live permanently but rather many of them went in and out of the area to fulfill their duties or participate in ceremonial functions.

Huánuco Pampa is one of at least six sites that were called New Cuscos, built in the conceptual, if not actual, image of the capital.

== Roads ==
The Inca road system was extensive. The main north-south highway, the Qhapaq Ñan, extending from Cusco to Quito, Ecuador, passes through Huánuco Pampa. The Qhapaq Ñan and other roads in Wanuku Pampa featured extended paved surfaces, paved staircases, stone drainage channels, retention walls, bridges and causeways. In some areas, the Qhapaq Ñan was 15 m (49 ft) wide and one paved staircase was 16 m (52 ft) wide, while two roads ran parallel along some stretches.

== Ceremonial Sections ==
The ceremonial sections of Huánuco Pampa display rare, finely cut and fitted, Imperial Inca style masonry and appear as unusual building types. Most of the eastern part of the city is occupied by the Casa del Inca and the ushnu or castillo is the main central plaza. In order to get to the Casa del Inca, one must pass through gates made of high-quality Imperial Inca style masonry with figures and carved pumas on either side and the connecting walls are constructed from pirqa, fieldstone set in mud. The connecting walls on the eastern side of the central plaza is called the kallanka, large building made from high-quality pirqa masonry rather than cut and fitted stones. These large buildings may have functioned as barracks, counting houses or a variety of other purposes.

The interior of the Casa del Inca is made up of fifteen structures which open to the central courtyard and serve multiple purposes. There are houses, baths made of Inca style masonry, terraces, sunken gardens, pools and possibly a temple, which may have never been completely finished before the city was abandoned.

The ushnu is the main central plaza which is a solid platform constructed out of Imperial Inca style masonry. There are two smaller buildings on the east side of the lower terrace which may have been used for ceremonies performed on the ushnu. The gates of the ushnu are made of stone sculptures which may symbolize pairs of pumas. The ushnu is found at several other Inca sites and may have been used by important leaders for public events of political, administrative or ceremonial nature.

When it came to for ceremonies or other large event where people would come into the land for a set amount of time, it was not rare to find Inca art work. One of the more commonly used items at ceremonies were the pottery items. Textiles and metals were important to the Inca civilization, but pottery is what made the Inca's art work stand out. The Cusco-style polychrome pottery work is the archaeological hallmark of Inca presence. Pottery was especially important in ceremonies and would not be used during everyday tasks or by ethnic groups on a regular bases.

== Residential Districts ==
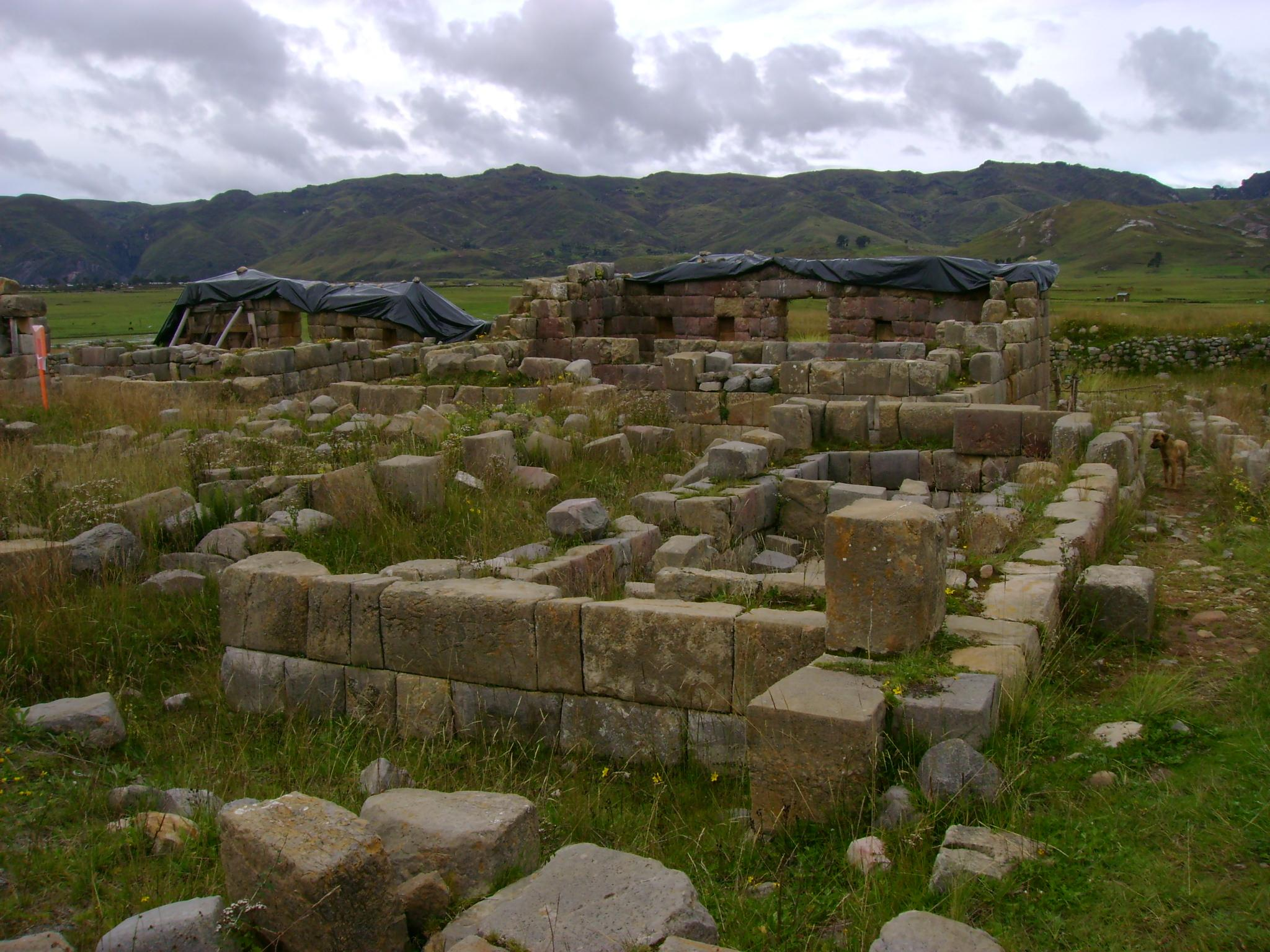
Partial view of Huánuco Pampa.

The north and south barrios, or quarters, of Huánuco Pampa were used mostly as residential districts. In some cases, the areas are very formally arranged, such as the cuartel in the northern barrio, which to a European, appears just as an army barrack. Many Inca people lived in rectangular houses with trapezoidally-shaped niches in the interior walls. All of these houses are built from pirqa masonry, typically bifacial walls with rubble and mud fill. Many of these houses are arranged around a central courtyard.

Ethnic groups moved in and out of the land constantly, because of ceremonies and duties, there is no real large group that have called the land home. However, archeological evidence suggests that one important group of permanent residents were the Aqllakuna.

It was at Huáanuco Pampa where the first conquerors founded a city in 1539 which due to the coldness of the climate was then transferred to the pleasant and temperate Pillco valley that lies on the Huallaga River.

== The Storage Area ==
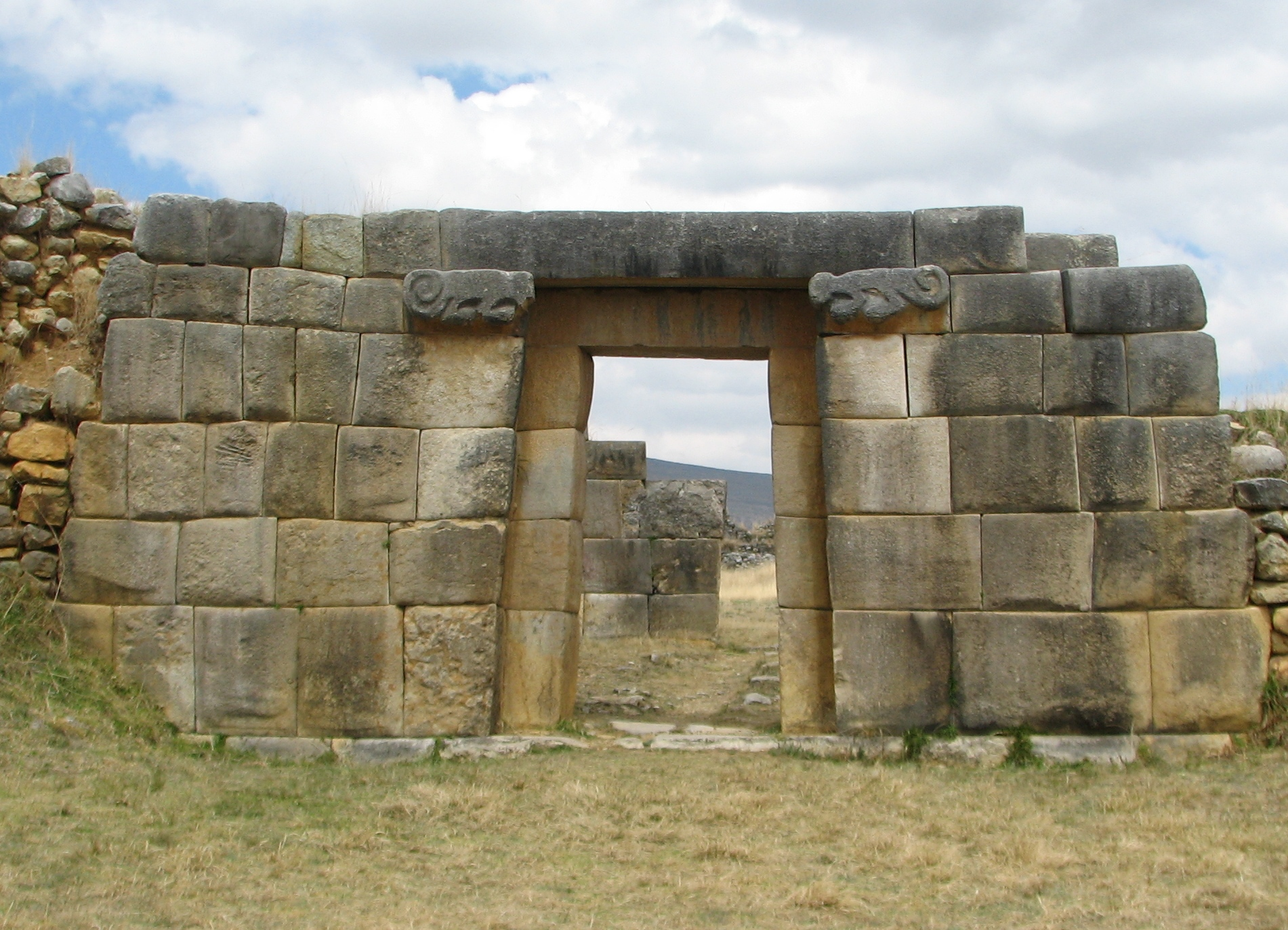
Trapezoidal door

The storage area at Huánuco Pampa includes 497 qullqas (storehouses) and 30 processing and administration buildings. The city may have been an extremely important redistributive center supplying the provincial villages of the area it administered with the products of other regions. Qollqas are constructed in rows and made of pirqa masonry, just as the residential districts. The groups of storehouses included: 1) a small zone of storehouses which may have held the stores, of the Sun, the state religion; 2) minor groups of single storehouses apparently devoted to special shrines or ceremonial activities; 3) an ill-defined section of buildings which may have held a wide variety of goods in temporary storage for more immediate uses; and 4), the largest group, which was devoted to long-term storage of various food stuffs and other goods in technologically specialized facilities. Storage was very diverse among crops, for example, root crops were placed in the middle of layers of straw, bound into bales with rope and stored in rectangular structures, while maize was stored shelled, in large jars which were put in circular storehouses with stone floors. Highland root crops made up 50-80% of the space, while maize made up 5-7%.

The influx of supplies at Huánuco Pampa was quite uneven. Famine or breakdown in the socio-political mechanisms that assured delivery may have complicated normal seasonal variations. The demand for goods was also in constant fluctuation. Large scale storage was crucial for keeping up a city such as Huánuco Pampa,
