= Dos de Mayo province =

Coordinates: 9.833°S 76.669°W

Dos de Mayo
- Province
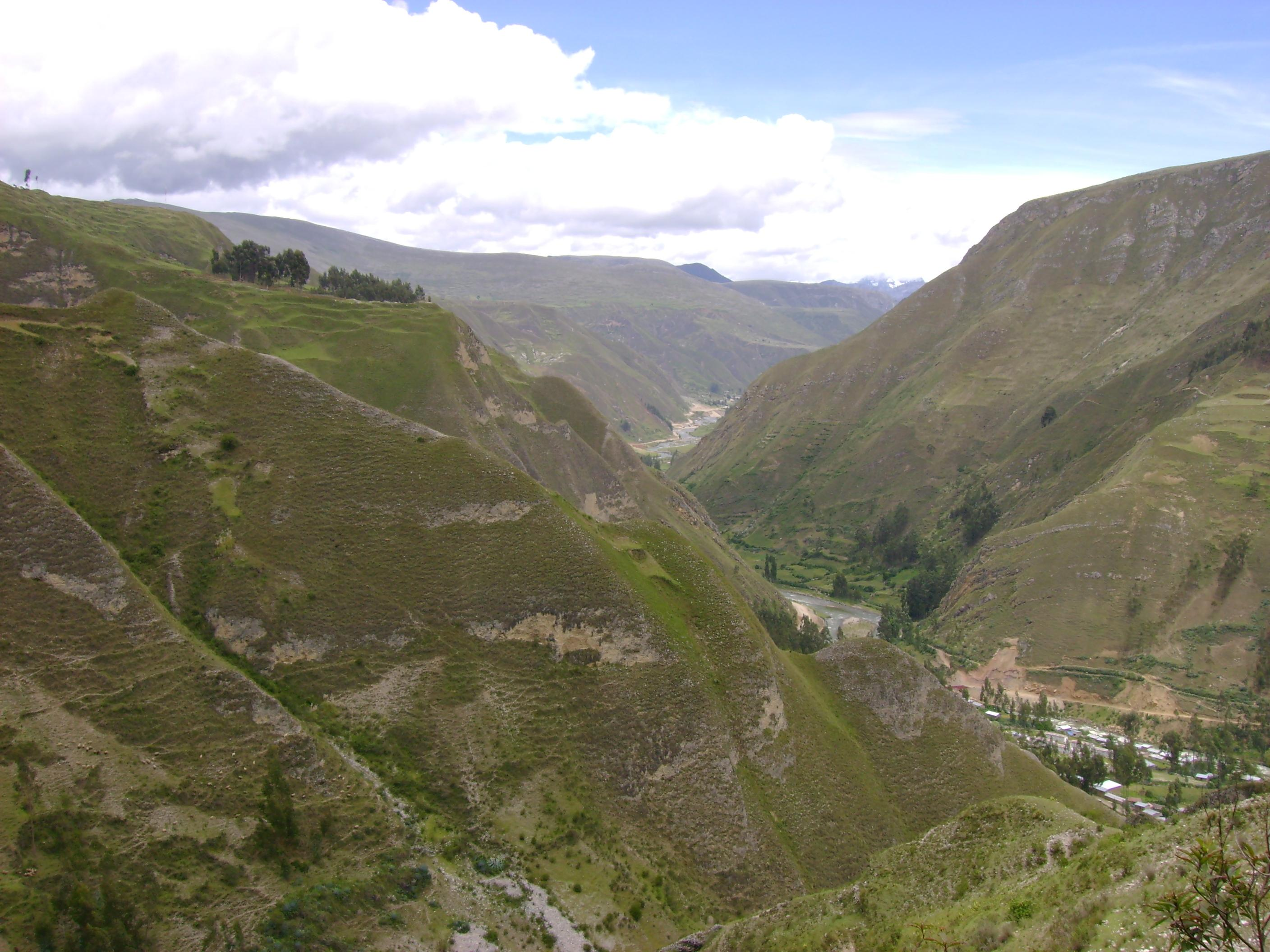
- Urqumayu valley

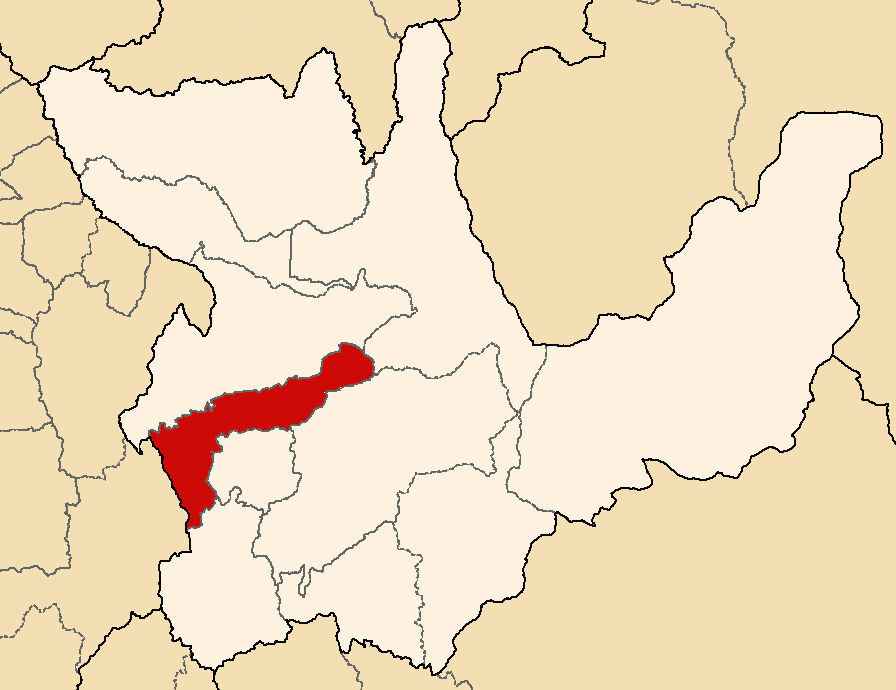
- Location of Dos de Mayo in the Huánuco Region
- Country: Peru
- Region: Huánuco
- Founded: November 5, 1870
- Capital: La Unión

Government
  - Mayor: Luis Maldonado Rivera (2019–2022)

Area
  - Total: 1,438.88 km^{2} (555.55 sq mi)
- Elevation: 3,226 m (10,584 ft)

Population
  - Total: 33,258
  - Density: 23.114/km^{2} (59.864/sq mi)
- UBIGEO: 1003
- Website: Official Website

Dos de Mayo (literally May 2) is one of eleven provinces of the Huánuco Region in Peru. The capital of this province is the city of La Unión.

== Boundaries ==
- North: province of Huamalíes
- East: province of Leoncio Prado
- South: provinces of Huánuco, Yarowilca and Lauricocha
- West: Ancash Region

== Geography ==
Some of the highest mountains of the province are listed below:

- Allqa Raqra
- Allqay
- Aquy P'itiq
- Chuskuqucha
- Hanka Punta
- Hanka Wasi
- Hatun Punta
- Hatun P'unqu
- Hirka Kancha
- Kimsa Qucha
- Kinwa Qucha
- Kunkayuq
- Kushuru
- Khuchi Mach'ay
- Mama Hirka
- Maray
- Millpu Punta
- Pampa Wasi
- Pinqullu
- Pishtaq Punta
- Puchka Punta
- Puka Hirka
- Puka Raqra
- Phiruruyuq Punta
- P'itiq
- Qisqi Punta
- Qiwlla Qucha
- Quchayuq Punta
- Quriqucha
- Raqra Punta
- Riku Hirka
- Rumi Sunqu
- Rupha Pampa
- Saqra Waqra
- Saqsa Kusma
- Tikti Punta
- Tinku Pampa Punta
- Tuna Kancha
- Tutu Punta
- Ukru Wayin
- Waka Mach'ay Punta
- Wamalla Punta
- Wamash Punta
- Wank'a Mayu
- Wank'a Ukru Punta
- Wayta Hirka Punta
- Winchus
- Wiru Wiru
- Yana Mach'ay
- Yana Phaqcha
- Yuraq Yaku
- Yuraq Yaku Punta

== Political division ==
The province is divided into nine districts, which are:

- Chuquis
- La Unión
- Marías
- Pachas
- Quivilla
- Ripán
- Shunqui
- Sillapata
- Yanas

== Ethnic groups ==
The province is inhabited by indigenous citizens of Quechua descent. Spanish, however, is the language which the majority of the population (59.82%) learnt to speak in childhood, 39.87% of the residents started speaking using the Quechua language (2007 Peru Census).

== See also ==
- Qiwllaqucha
- Huánuco Pampa
