= Chuquis District =

Coordinates: 9.6777°S 76.7053°W

Chuquis
- District
- Interactive map of Chuquis
- Country: Peru
- Region: Huánuco
- Province: Dos de Mayo
- Founded: September 18, 1960
- Capital: Chuquis, Peru

Government
  - Mayor: Victor Maulle Lavado Dimas

Area
  - Total: 151.25 km^{2} (58.40 sq mi)
- Elevation: 3,355 m (11,007 ft)

Population (2005 census)
  - Total: 4,333
  - Density: 28.65/km^{2} (74.20/sq mi)
- Time zone: UTC-5 (PET)
- UBIGEO: 100307

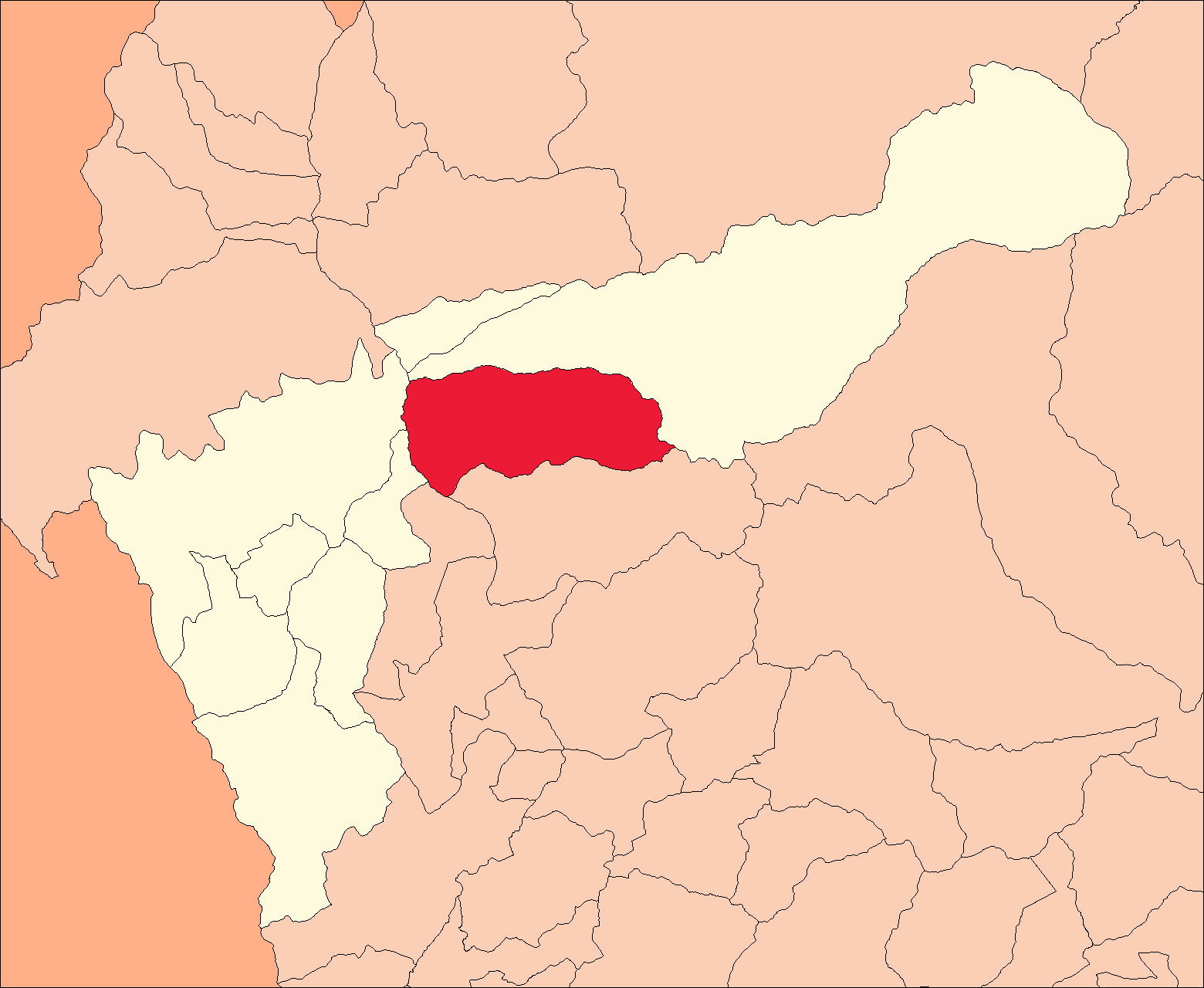

Chuquis District is one of nine districts of the province Dos de Mayo in Peru.

== Ethnic groups ==
The people in the district are mainly indigenous citizens of Quechua descent. Quechua is the language which the majority of the population (59.82%) learnt to speak in childhood, while 39.86% of the residents started speaking using the Spanish language (2007 Peru Census).
