= Belén, Honduras =

Belén
- Municipality
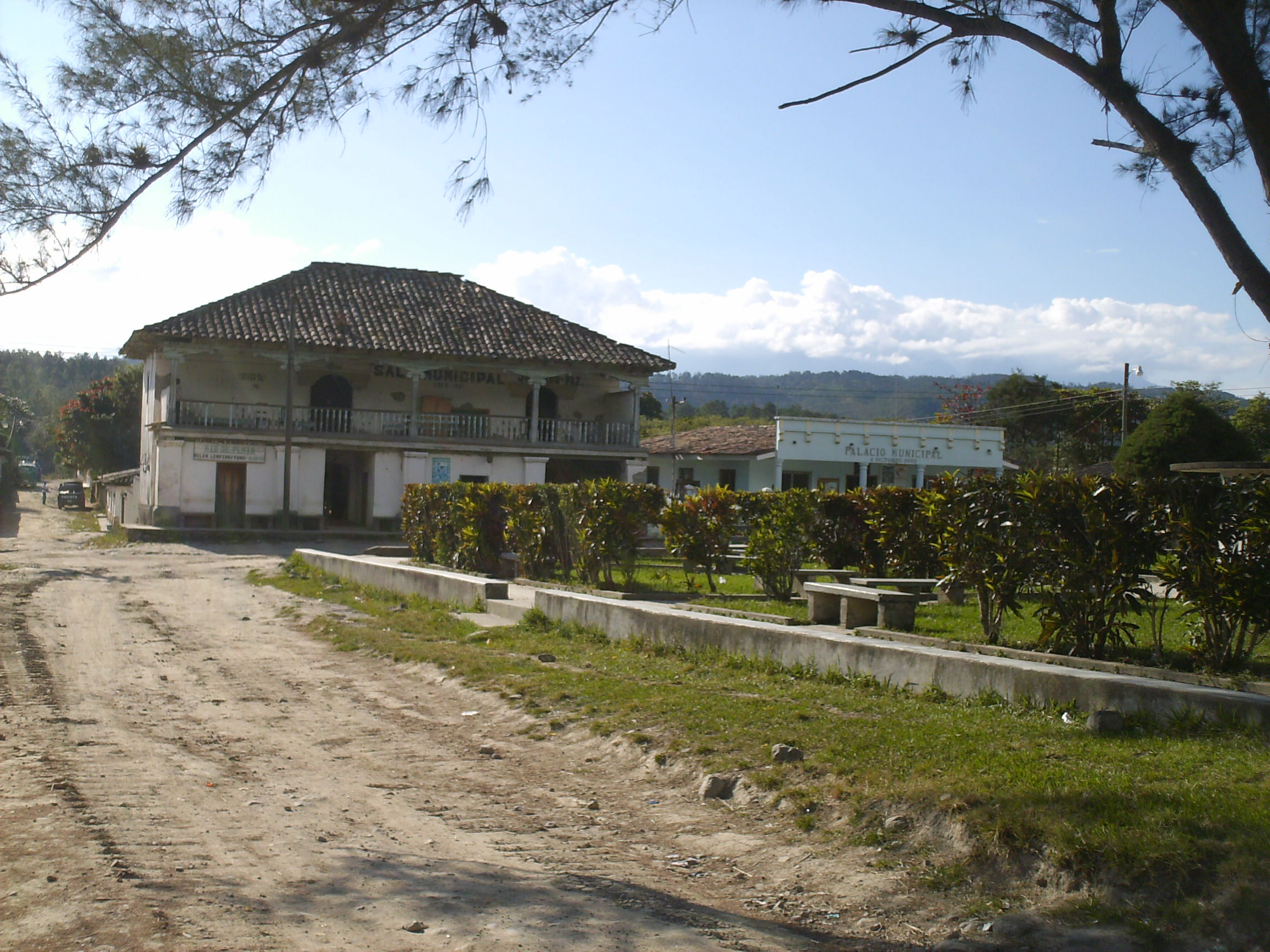
- Central Park in Belén

- Location in Honduras
- Coordinates: 14°30′N 88°30′W
- Country: Honduras
- Department: Lempira
- Municipality since: 1871

Area
  - Total: 198 km^{2} (76 sq mi)

Population (2015)
  - Total: 7,235
  - Density: 36.5/km^{2} (94.6/sq mi)

Belén is a municipality in the Honduran department of Lempira. The latitude is 15.75 north, the longitude is 87.93 west, and the altitude is 313 meters.

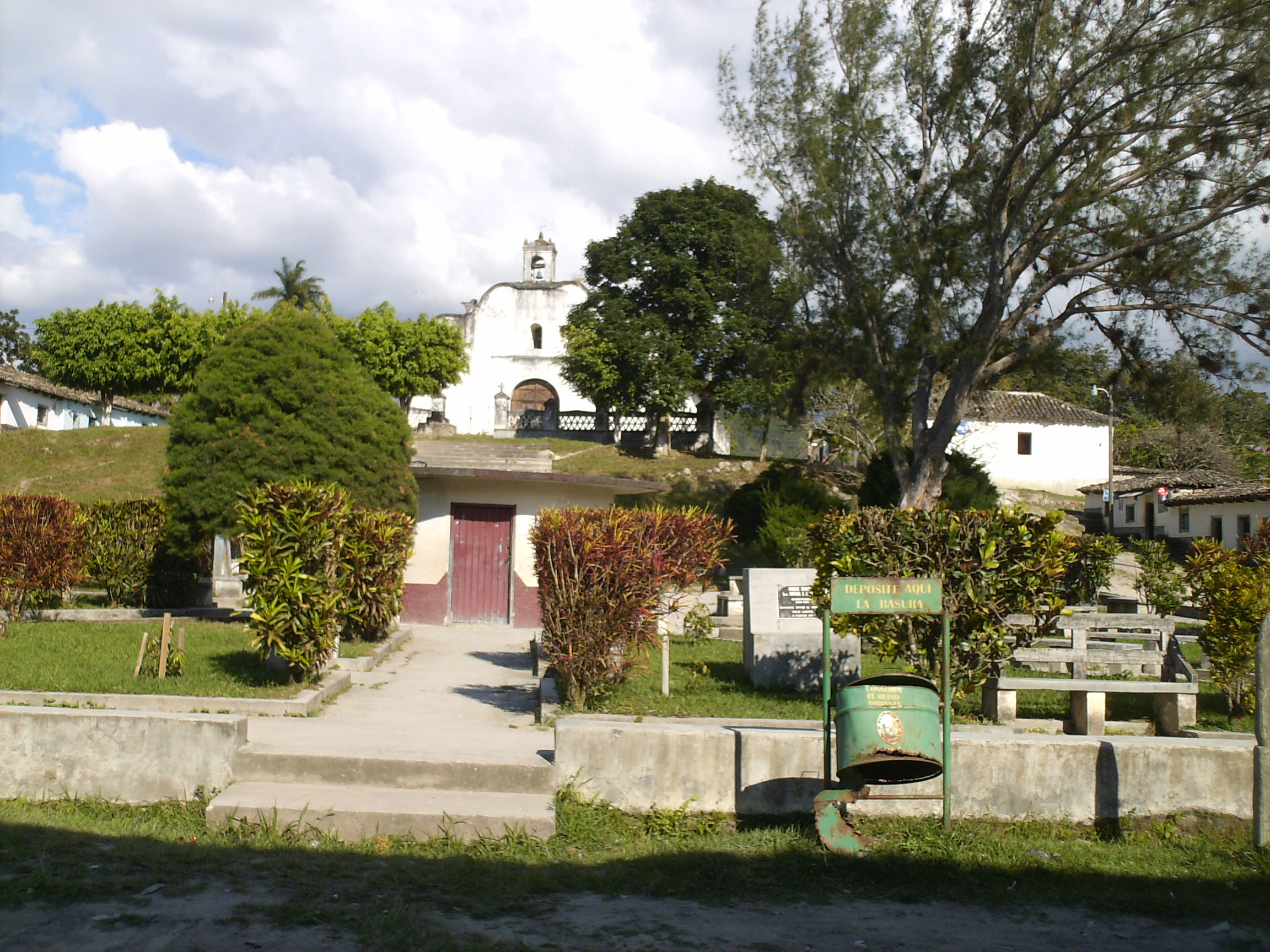
Old Church and Park in Belén

Belén is one of the municipalities of the Lempira department. It is located south east from the colonial city of Gracias, following the paved road heading to the Intibucá Department. The first big town in Intibucá is called San Juan (del Caite). To make it to the centre of the town, it is necessary to take a turn off at approximately 24 km from Gracias and then 3 km to the town. The paved road ends at the boundary of the Lempira and Intibuca departments. Currently, the government is still working on a road that was supposed to be finished 5 years ago.

== History ==
Belén was established as a municipality in 1871, according to old documents that are now kept in the mayor's office. The origin of its first settlers is uncertain, but it is believed that they were descendants of "Chorti" Indians, natives of the western part of the country. First known as "Curincunque", Belén appeared in the census of 1791, as part of the "Curato" of Gracias a Dios and in the national division of 1889 as part of Gracias district.

== Geography ==
Due to many pine forests all around the town and surrounding villages, locals enjoy very temperate weather throughout the year, except for the summer (dry) season from February through June. These forests also contain oak trees, but on a smaller scale. The forests, irregular hills and mountains around Belén provide many inspiring landscapes for both locals and tourists.

== Boundaries ==
Its boundaries are:

- North: La Iguala and Gracias
- South: Intibucá Department
- East: Intibucá Department
- West: La Campa
- Surface extents: 198 km²

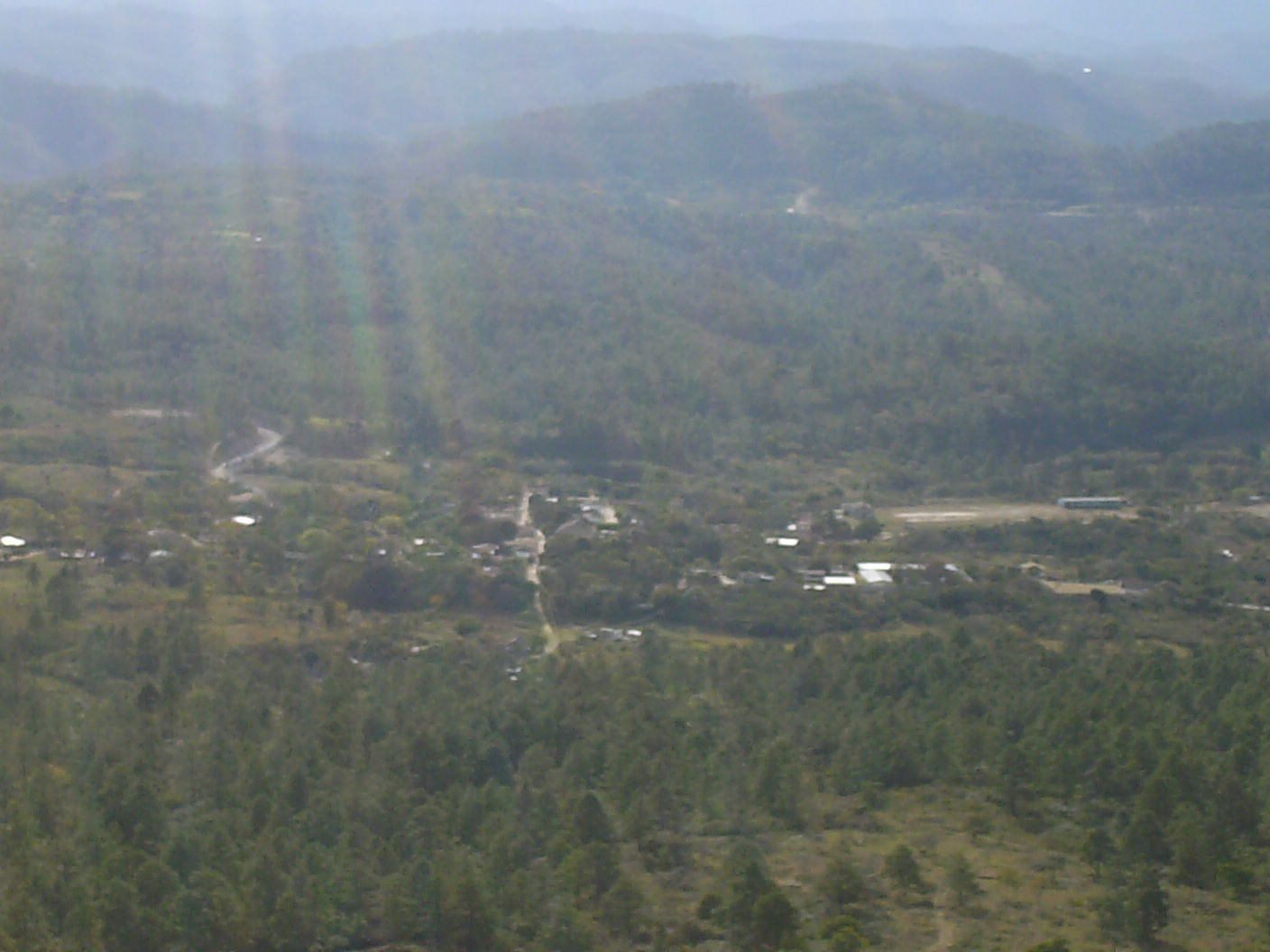
Panoramic view of Belén

== Resources ==
The main crops are corn, beans, and coffee. The government provides resources to improve the well-being of the people. Also, there are an important contributions from organisations such as World Vision to improve the quality of life for the poor. The main town and the majority of the villages have electricity. In 2007 the mayor's office started the installation of sewer systems in the main town of Belén. Since Belén is near the larger town of Gracias, it does not have any hotels or hostels.

== Population ==
- Population: The figure was 4,444 in 2001. This was used to elaborate an estimate by the INE Honduras (NSI National Statistics Institute), so in 2008 the population might be 5,728.
- Villages: 5
- Settlement: 51

=== Demographics ===
At the time of the 2013 Honduras census, Belén municipality had a population of 6,801. Of these, 90.78% were Indigenous (90.63% Lenca), 8.93% Mestizo, 0.24% Black or Afro-Honduran and 0.06% others.

== Tourism ==
As seen in the photos on this article, this town has the typical colonial distribution. Some old buildings made of adobe can be seen, but they are not preserved, with the exception of the old colonial church. There are no hostels or a places to stay, but that is not a problem because the city of Gracias and its many hotels are available.

- Local holidays: "Virgen del Rosario" day on 8 October.
