= Unión =

Unión may refer to:

== Places ==
- Unión, Paraguay
- Unión Municipality, Falcón, Venezuela
- Unión, Montevideo, Uruguay
- Unión Cantinil, Huehuetenango, Guatemala
- Unión, San Luis, Argentina
- Unión Department, Córdoba Province, Argentina
- Unión Hidalgo, Oaxaca, Mexico
- Unión Panamericana, Chocó, Colombia

== Sports clubs ==
- Unión Santiago, an association football club in Santiago del Estero, Argentina
- Unión de Curtidores, an association football club in Léon, Mexico
- Unión de Mar del Plata, an association football club in Mar del Plata, Argentina
- Unión de Santa Fe, an association football club in Santa Fe, Argentina
- Unión de Sunchales, an association football club in Sunchales, Argentina
- Unión Deportiva Salamanca, a former association football club in Salamanca, Spain
- Unión Española, an association football club in Independencia, Chile

== Other uses ==
- Unión Radio Televisión, a defunct Cuban television station

== See also ==
- La Unión (disambiguation)
- Union (disambiguation)
