= San Rafael, Honduras =

Municipality in Honduras

San Rafael
- Municipality
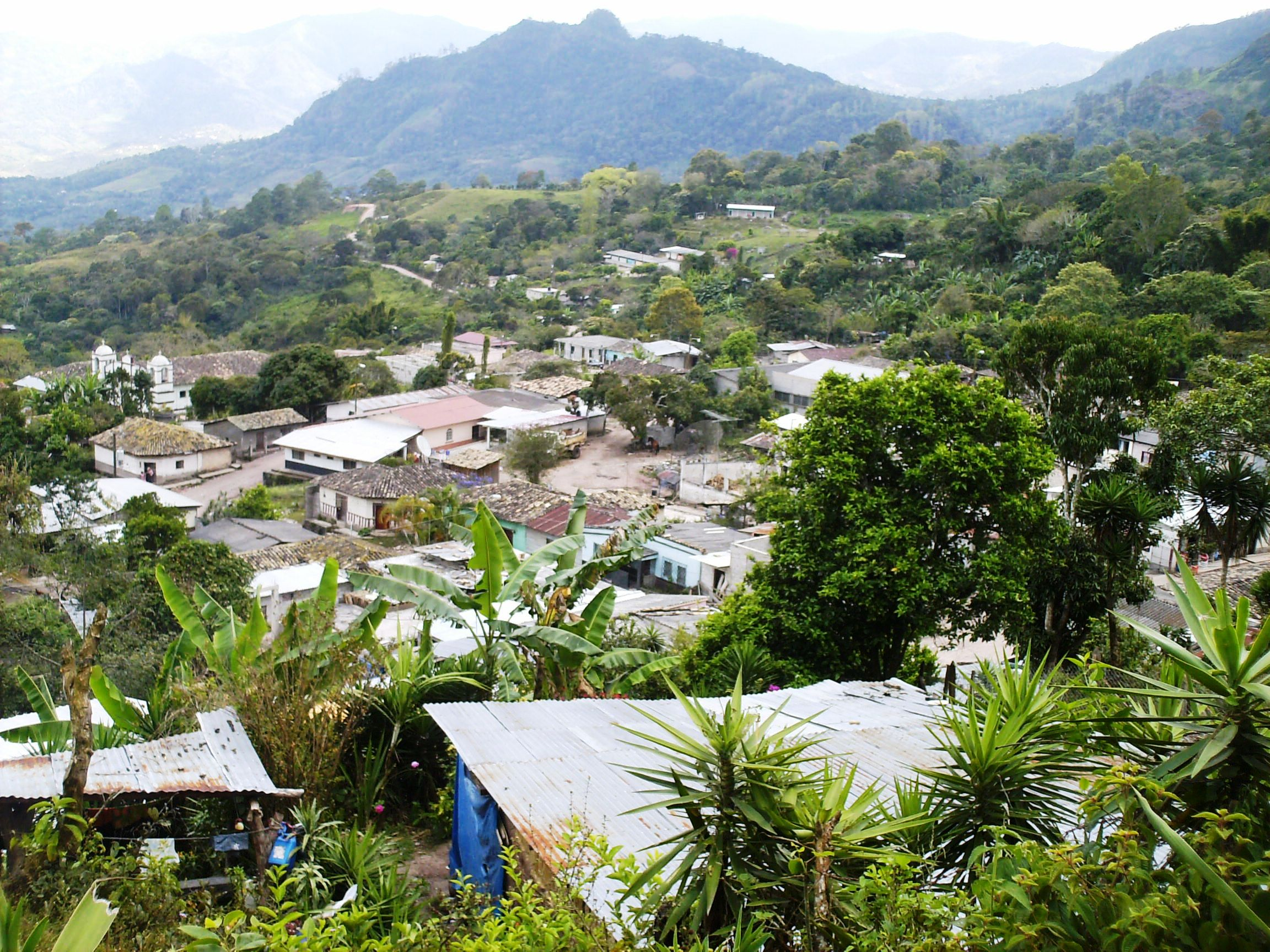
- Panoramic View of San Rafael

- Location in Honduras
- Coordinates: 14°43′37″N 88°25′10″W
- Country: Honduras
- Department: Lempira
- Municipality since: 17 July 1900; 126 years ago

Area
  - Total: 101 km^{2} (39 sq mi)

Population (2015)
  - Total: 13,764
  - Density: 136/km^{2} (353/sq mi)

San Rafael is a municipality in the Honduran department of Lempira.

It is one of the farthest municipalities of the Lempira department of Honduras. The best way to get to the municipality capital is via Santa Bárbara department, passing by El Nispero and San Jeronimo municipalities of this department.

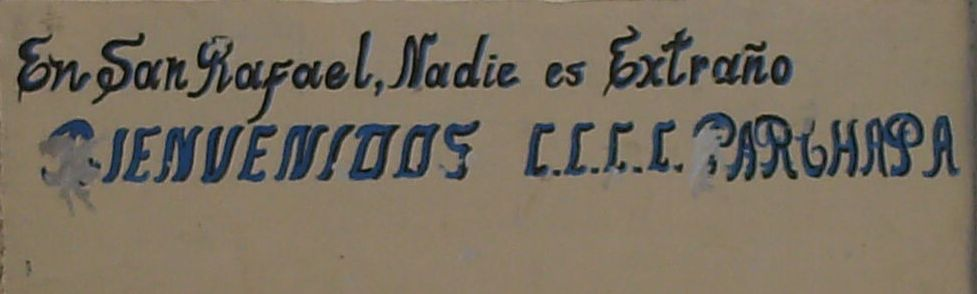
In San Rafael Nobody is a stranger

== History ==
In the census of 1887 it appears with the name of "El Conal" village, of La Iguala municipality, and until 17 July 1900 it was granted the category of municipality, in the administration of President Terencio Sierra.

== Geography ==
To get to the municipality capital it is necessary to go up and down through very steep mountains. The vegetation changes as going up and down these mountains, but the Pine forests are predominant. In a few cases there can be seen spots of different kinds of trees, their purpose is to provide shade to the coffee plantations. The weather is mostly cool, except in summer. Since it is relatively near the "Lago de Yojoa" area, the precipitation is a little higher than the rest of the department.

== Boundaries ==
Its boundaries are:

- North : La Unión municipality and Santa Bárbara department.
- South : La Iguala municipality.
- East : Santa Bárbara department.
- West : La Iguala municipality.
- Surface Extents: 101 km^{2}

== Resources ==
The most important activity is coffee plantations. Beans and Corn crops are next, but mostly for local consumption as well as raising cattle. It is worth mentioning that there are a few handcrafts producers of several things such as hats,"petates"(some sort of a carpet) of reed. They obtain the water from wells and some streams nearby. As does the rest of the department it has electricity and mobile communication services. The bus services are more common for Santa Barbara.

== Population ==
- Population:For the year 2001 this municipality had 10,468 people, this figure was the base for an estimate, and the result for 2015 is the figure of 13,769 people.
- Villages: 9
- Settlements: 53

=== Demographics ===
At the time of the 2013 Honduras census, San Rafael municipality had a population of 13,410. Of these, 55.97% were Mestizo, 34,99% Indigenous (34.76% Lenca), 6.17% White and 2.88% Black or Afro-Honduran.

== Tourism ==
It takes about 2.5 hours to get there from the city of Santa Barbara and the road is in much better conditions. The other way is via the city of Gracias, and it is about 60 km from it. It is necessary to take the common road to La Iguala and La Unión, first passing by the "Puca" mountain and then some other steep mountains.

- Local Holidays: "San Rafael" day on 29 September.
