= Chuskuqucha =

Mountain in Peru

- Location within Peru

Highest point
- Elevation: 4,271 m (14,012 ft)
- Coordinates: 9°38′34″S 76°26′23″W

Geography
- Location: Huánuco Region
- Parent range: Andes

Chuskuqucha (local Quechua chusku four, Quechua qucha lake, "four lakes", also spelled Chuscococha) is a 4,271-metre-high (14,012 ft) mountain in the Andes of Peru. It is located in the Huánuco Region, Dos de Mayo Province, Marías District.
