= Tikti Punta =

Mountain in Peru

- Location within Peru

Highest point
- Elevation: 4,944 m (16,220 ft)
- Coordinates: 9°37′48″S 76°28′31″W

Geography
- Location: Huánuco Region
- Parent range: Andes

Tikti Punta (Quechua tikti wart, punta peak; ridge; first, before, in front of, "wart peak", also spelled Ticte Punta) is a 4,944-metre-high (16,220 ft) mountain in the Andes of Peru. It is located in the Huánuco Region, Dos de Mayo Province, Marías District. Tikti Punta lies southeast of Wank'a Ukru Punta and northeast of a lake named Saqsaqucha ("multi-colored lake").
