= Pampa Wasi =

Mountain in Peru

- Location within Peru

Highest point
- Elevation: 4,123 m (13,527 ft)
- Coordinates: 9°38′35″S 76°25′16″W

Geography
- Location: Huánuco Region
- Parent range: Andes

Pampa Wasi (Quechua pampa a large plain, wasi house, "plain house", also spelled Pampahuasi) is a 4,123-metre-high (13,527 ft) mountain in the Andes of Peru. It is located in the Huánuco Region, Dos de Mayo Province, Marías District.
