= La Iguala =

- Municipality
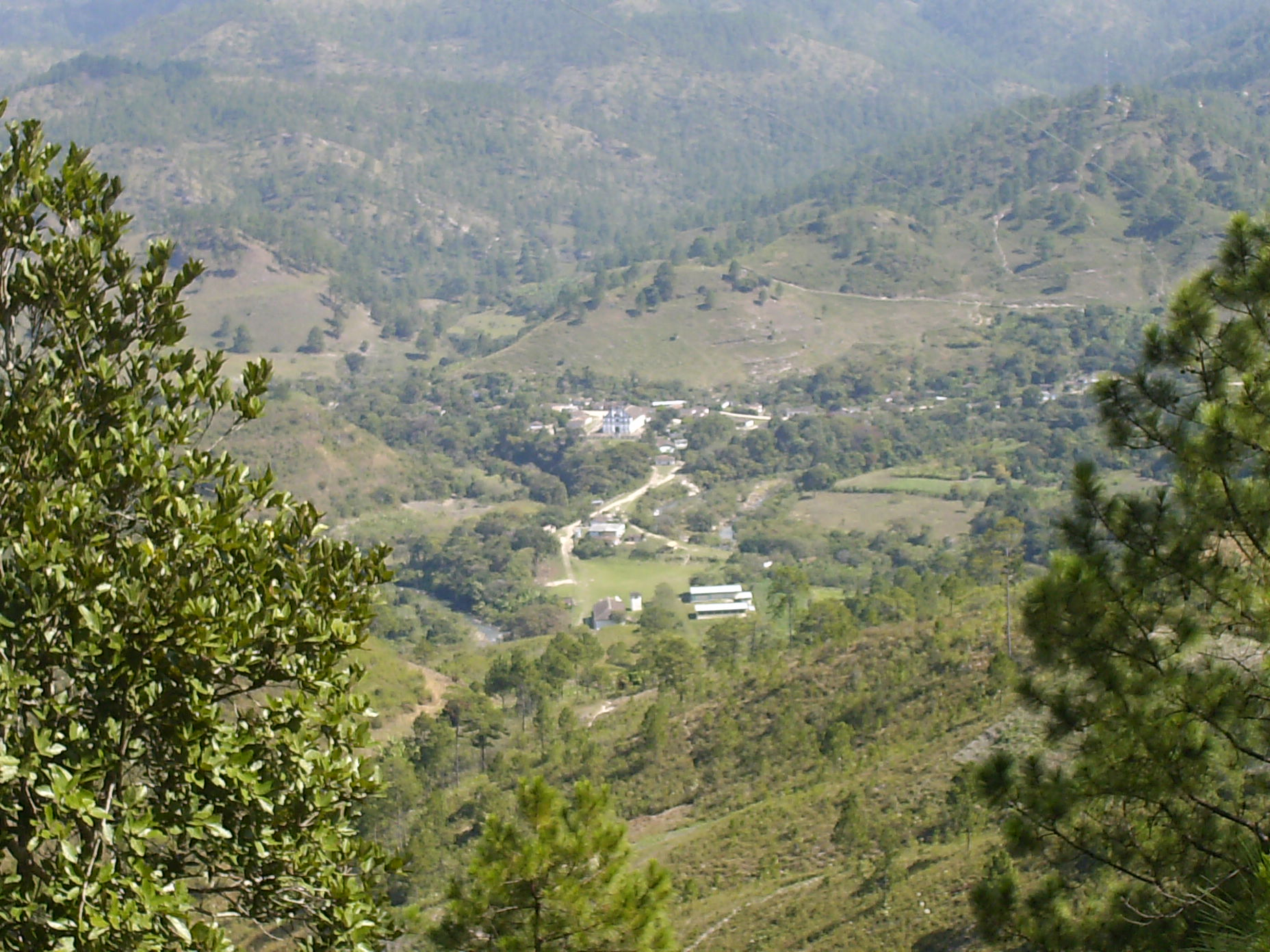
- Panoramic View of La Iguala Centro

- Location in Honduras
- Coordinates: 14°37′N 88°28′W
- Country: Honduras
- Department: Lempira
- Founded: 1 May 1556; 470 years ago

Area
  - Total: 349 km^{2} (135 sq mi)

Population (2015)
  - Total: 26,805
  - Density: 76.8/km^{2} (199/sq mi)

La Iguala (Spanish pronunciation: [lajˈɣwala]) is a municipality in the Honduran department of Lempira.

La Iguala is one of the oldest municipalities of the Lempira department. The municipality capital is also known as "La Iguala Centro". The access to this town is quite a challenge. Both ways will be briefly described here. The first one is to take the road to the other municipalities of San Rafael and La Unión, going up and down mountains for 30 km and through several communities. At "El Matazano" community is the detour for "La Iguala Centro" after 15 km. This second part of the journey from "El Matazano" is rough due to the conditions of the road. The alternate way takes 30 minutes but it is only recommended for four-wheel-drive vehicles, on the road the Belén at 12 km is located the deviations at "Los Siles" community.

== History ==
La Iguala is an ancient town founded by the Lenca Indians. Its first municipality goes back to May 1, 1556, with the name of "Santiago de La Iguala", over time shortened to "La Iguala". It already existed when the Spanish founded the city of Gracias.

== Geography ==
Its location is between two rivers and surrounded by several high and steep hills. The two rivers become one at "La Iguala". There are many pine forests.

== Boundaries ==
Its boundaries are:

- North : La Unión municipality and Santa Bárbara department.
- South : Belén municipality.
- East : San Rafael municipality and Intibuca department.
- West : Lepaera municipality.
- Surface Extents: 349 km²

== Resources ==
"La Iguala Centro" is not an ideal place for coffee plantations, but in the rest of the high mountains it has become the first product. Corn and bean crops are very common in "La Iguala Centro" and bananas and pineapples are grown on a small scale. Cattle and milk derivatives are for local use. It has electricity and mobile communications services.

== Population ==
When going to "La Iguala Centro", one can see the traits of the people. 3/4 of them are descendants from Lencas natives, the remaining 1/4 are Mestizos.

- Population: the figure for 2001 was 18,043.
- Villages: 26
- Settlements: 86

=== Demographics ===
At the time of the 2013 Honduras census, La Iguala municipality had a population of 25,491. Of these, 52.73% were Mestizo, 44.13% Indigenous (44.09% Lenca), 2.20% White, 0.89% Black or Afro-Honduran and 0.04% others.

== Tourism ==
This municipality does not have much to offer. Suggested attractions are the old colonial church and some birth certificate from 1883 in the local office. La Iguala offers visitors the stillness of a rural area and fishing.

- Local Holidays: "Virgen de Los Angeles" day; August 13 to 16.

== Gallery ==
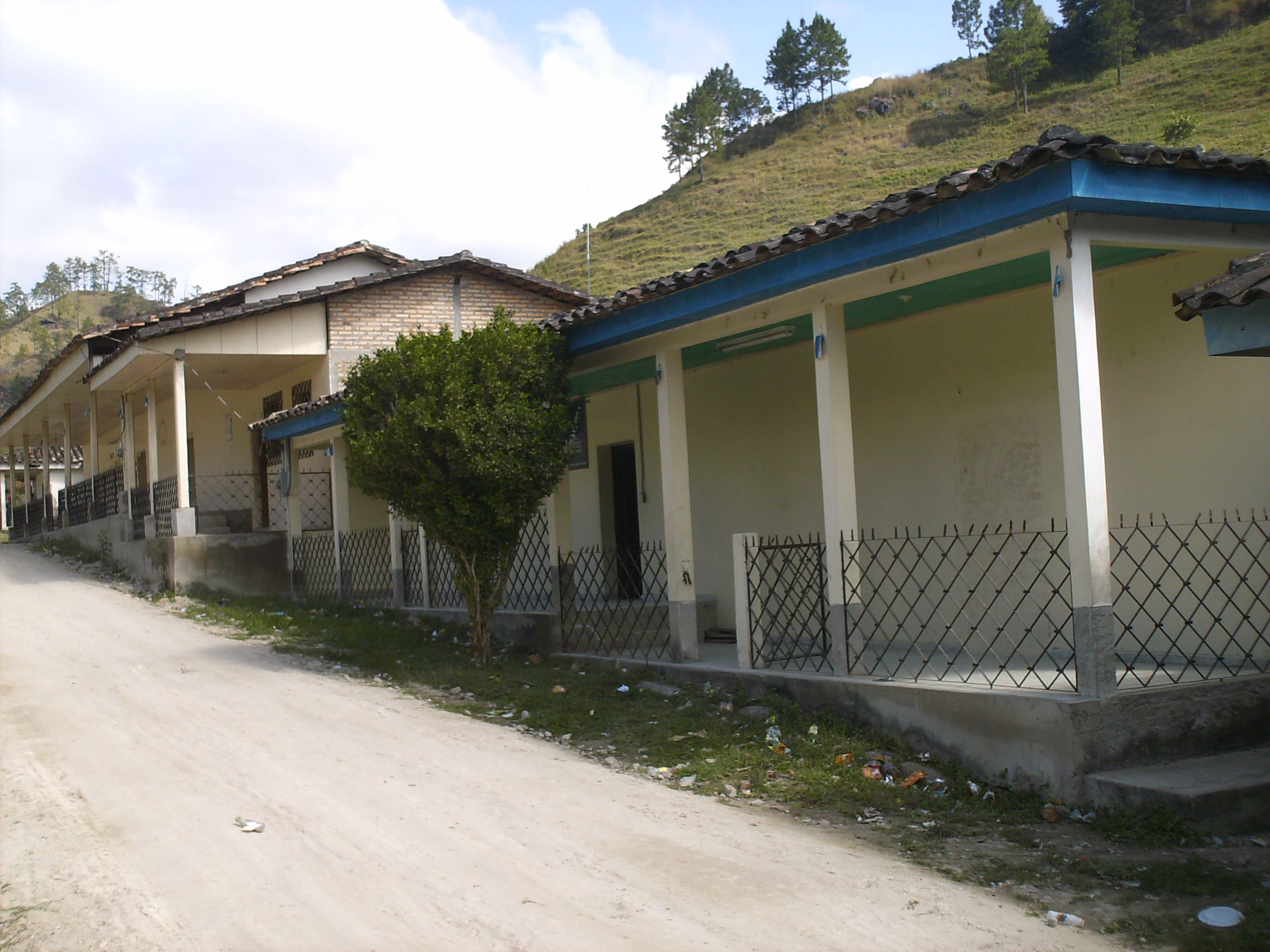
The Mayor's Office and other administrative buildings

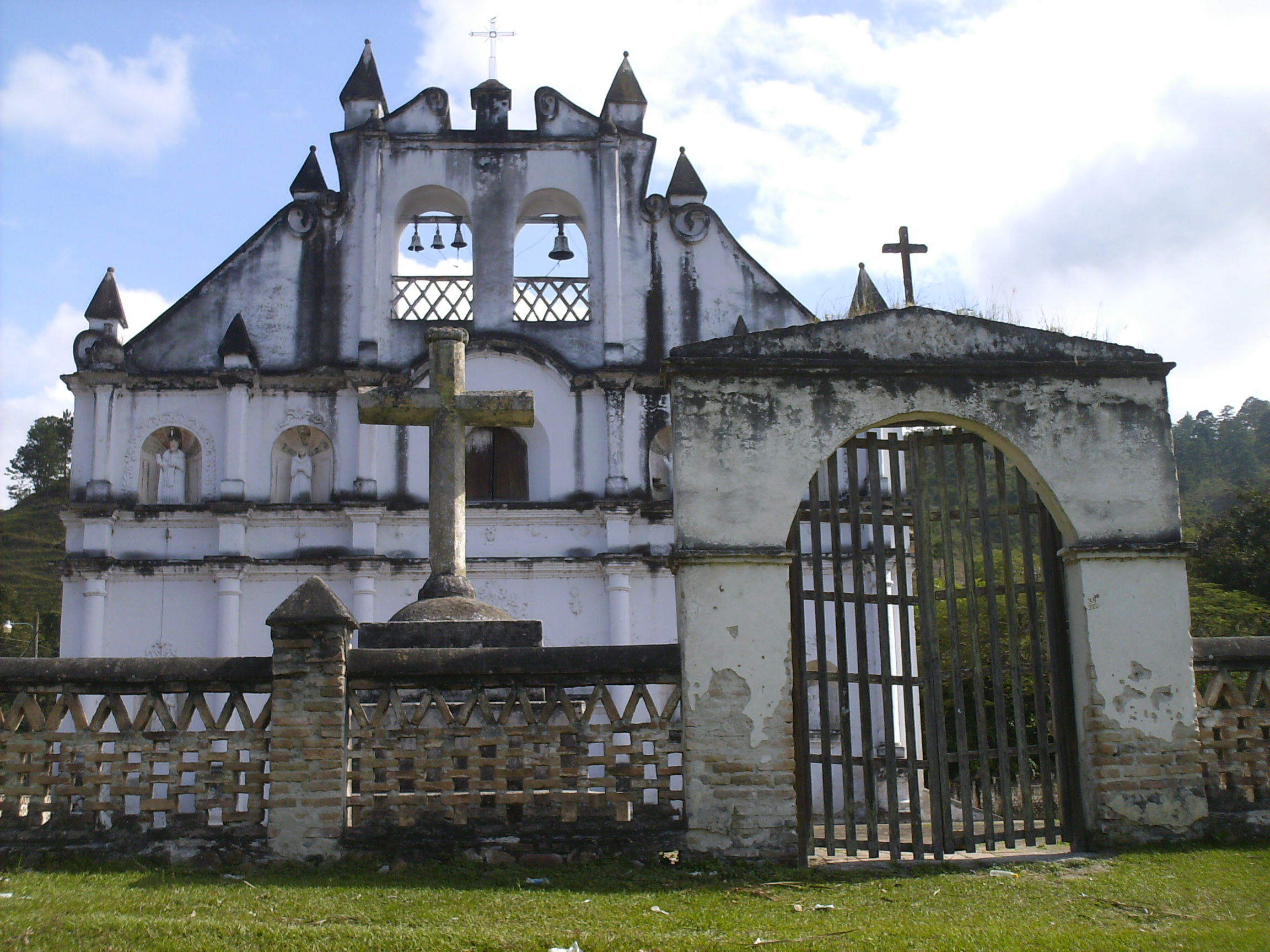
Old Colonial Church of La Iguala Centro

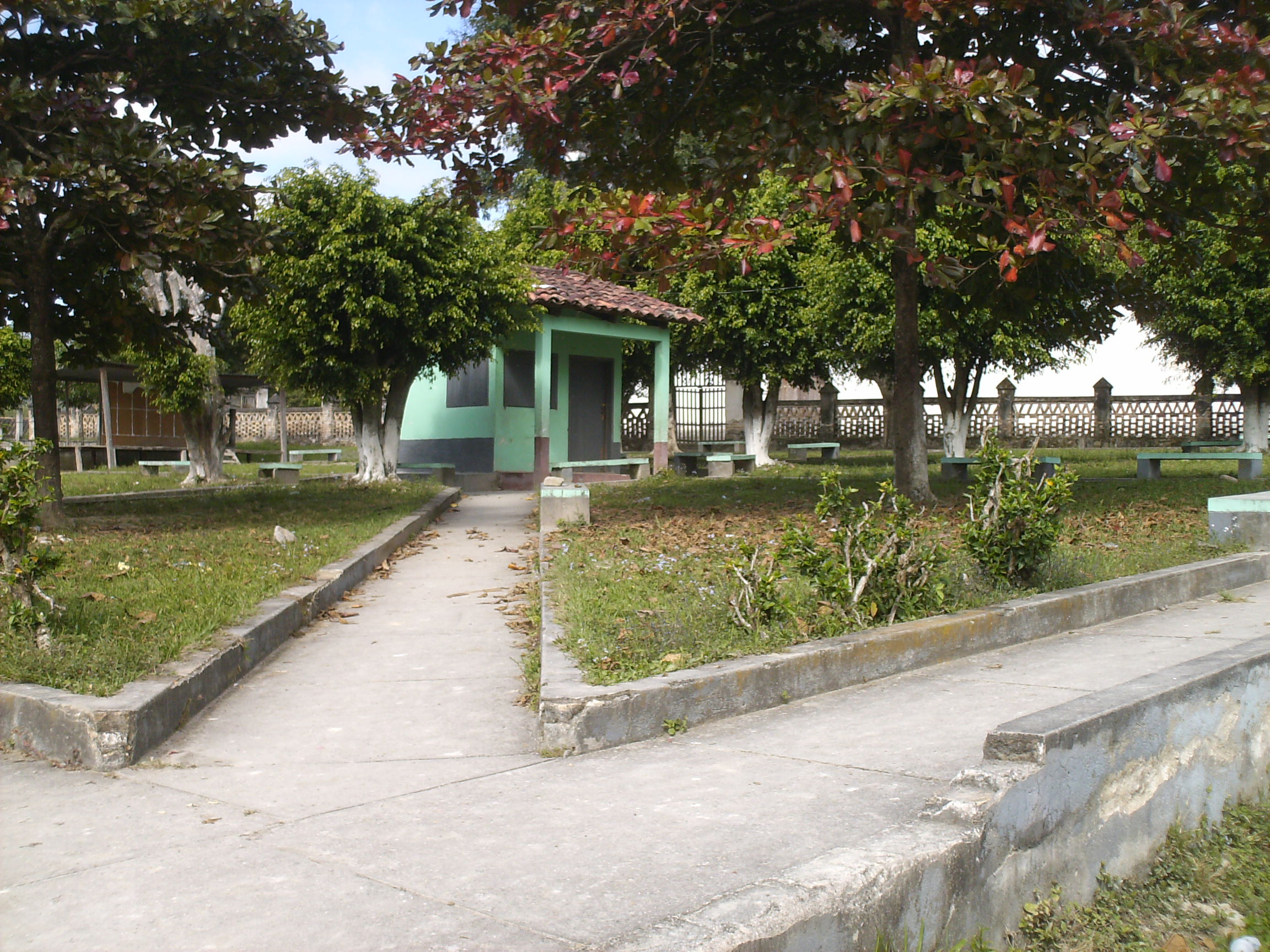
Central Park on one side of The Church

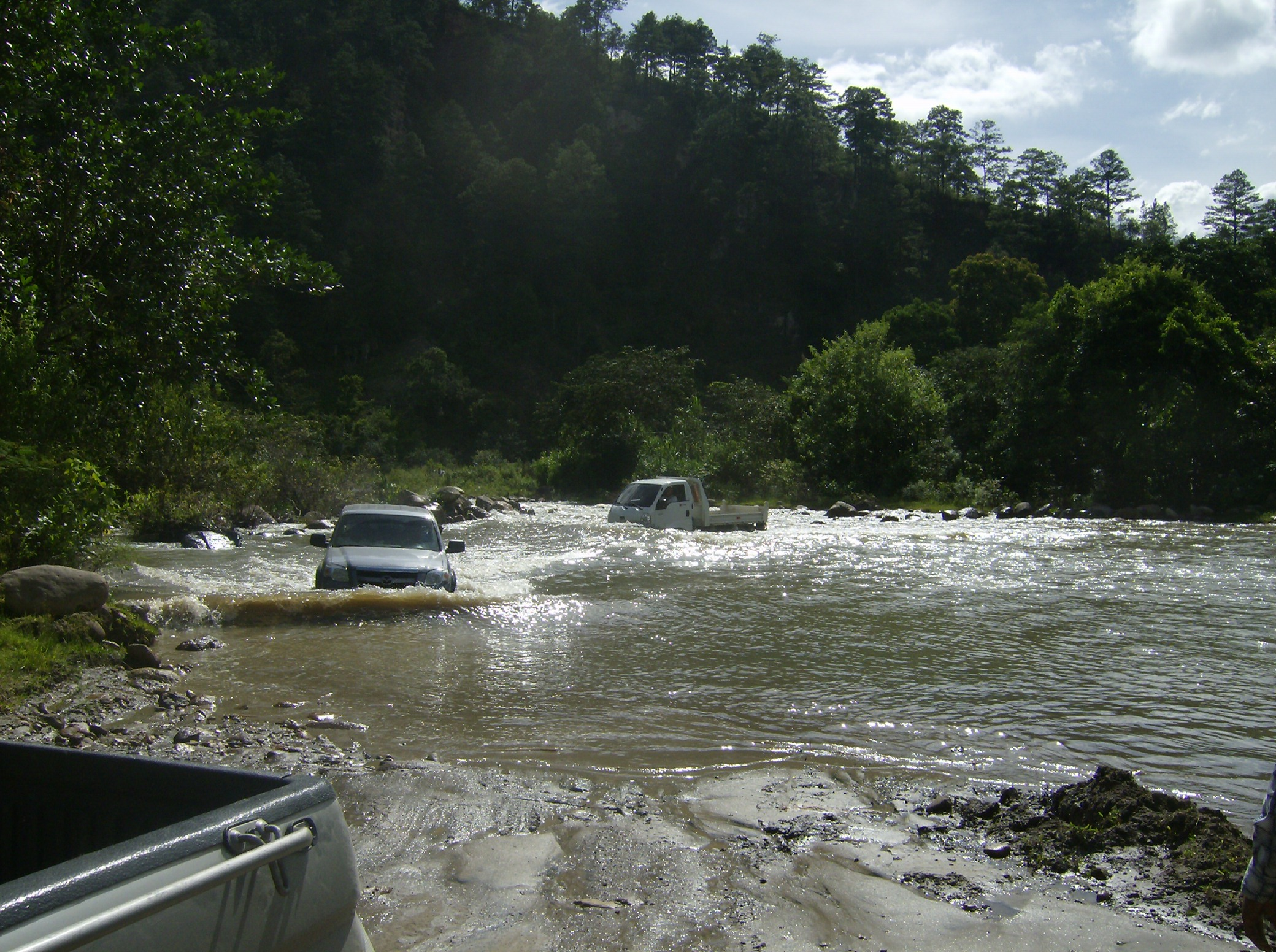
Crossing "Conchaguala" river
