= Qiwllaqucha (Dos de Mayo) =

Lake in Peru

- Location within Peru
- Location: Peru; Huánuco Region
- Coordinates: 9°31′47″S 76°28′38″W
- Max. length: 0.47 km (0.29 mi)
- Max. width: 0.2 km (0.12 mi)
- Surface elevation: 4,037 m (13,245 ft)

Qiwllaqucha (Quechua qillwa, qiwlla, qiwiña gull, qucha lake, "gull lake", hispanicized spelling Quiullacocha) is a small lake in Peru located in the Huánuco Region, Dos de Mayo Province, Marías District. It is situated at a height of about 4,037 metres (13,245 ft), about 0.47 km long and 0.2 km at its widest point.
