= Quivilla District =

Coordinates: 9.5997°S 76.7259°W

Quivilla
- District
- Interactive map of Quivilla
- Country: Peru
- Region: Huánuco
- Province: Dos de Mayo
- Founded: September 12, 1921
- Capital: Quivilla

Government
  - Mayor: Isau Juan Vera Berrospi

Area
  - Total: 33.6 km^{2} (13.0 sq mi)
- Elevation: 2,938 m (9,639 ft)

Population (2005 census)
  - Total: 1,231
  - Density: 36.6/km^{2} (94.9/sq mi)
- Time zone: UTC-5 (PET)
- UBIGEO: 100316

Quivilla District is one of nine districts of the province Dos de Mayo in Peru.
