= Shunqui District =

Coordinates: 9.7324°S 76.7868°W

Shunqui
- District
- Interactive map of Shunqui
- Country: Peru
- Region: Huánuco
- Province: Dos de Mayo
- Founded: September 18, 1960
- Capital: Shunqui

Government
  - Mayor: Billy Mendoza Huarac

Area
  - Total: 32.26 km^{2} (12.46 sq mi)
- Elevation: 3,545 m (11,631 ft)

Population (2005 census)
  - Total: 2,299
  - Density: 71.26/km^{2} (184.6/sq mi)
- Time zone: UTC-5 (PET)
- UBIGEO: 100321

Shunqui District is one of nine districts of the province Dos de Mayo in Peru.
