= La Unión, Lempira =

La Unión
- Municipality
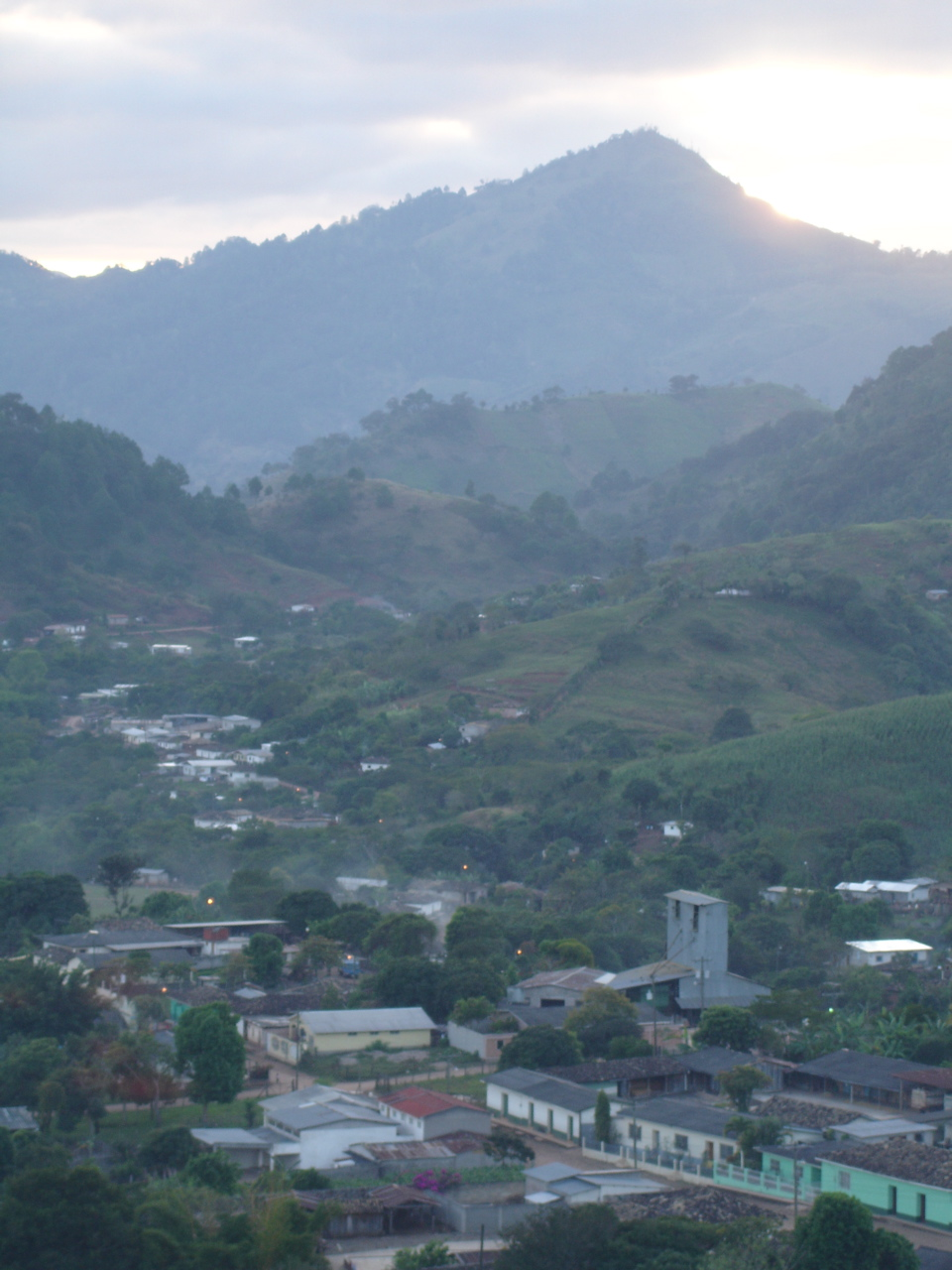
- La Unión

- Location within Honduras
- Coordinates: 14°49′N 88°24′W
- Country: Honduras
- Department: Lempira
- Municipality since: 3 May 1916; 110 years ago

Area
  - Total: 84 km^{2} (32 sq mi)

Population (2015)
  - Total: 13,319
  - Density: 160/km^{2} (410/sq mi)
- Climate: Aw

La Unión is a municipality in the Honduran department of Lempira.

It is one of the smallest municipalities of the Lempira department; travel to La Unión is a challenge. One way is to go 75 km from Gracias city on the common road for La Iguala and San Rafael, about 3 km before San Rafael is a left turn. An additional 13 km must be travelled. Another way is via Santa Bárbara-El Nispero-San Jerónimo-San Rafael-La Unión; the first 3 locations are in Santa Bárbara department.

== History ==
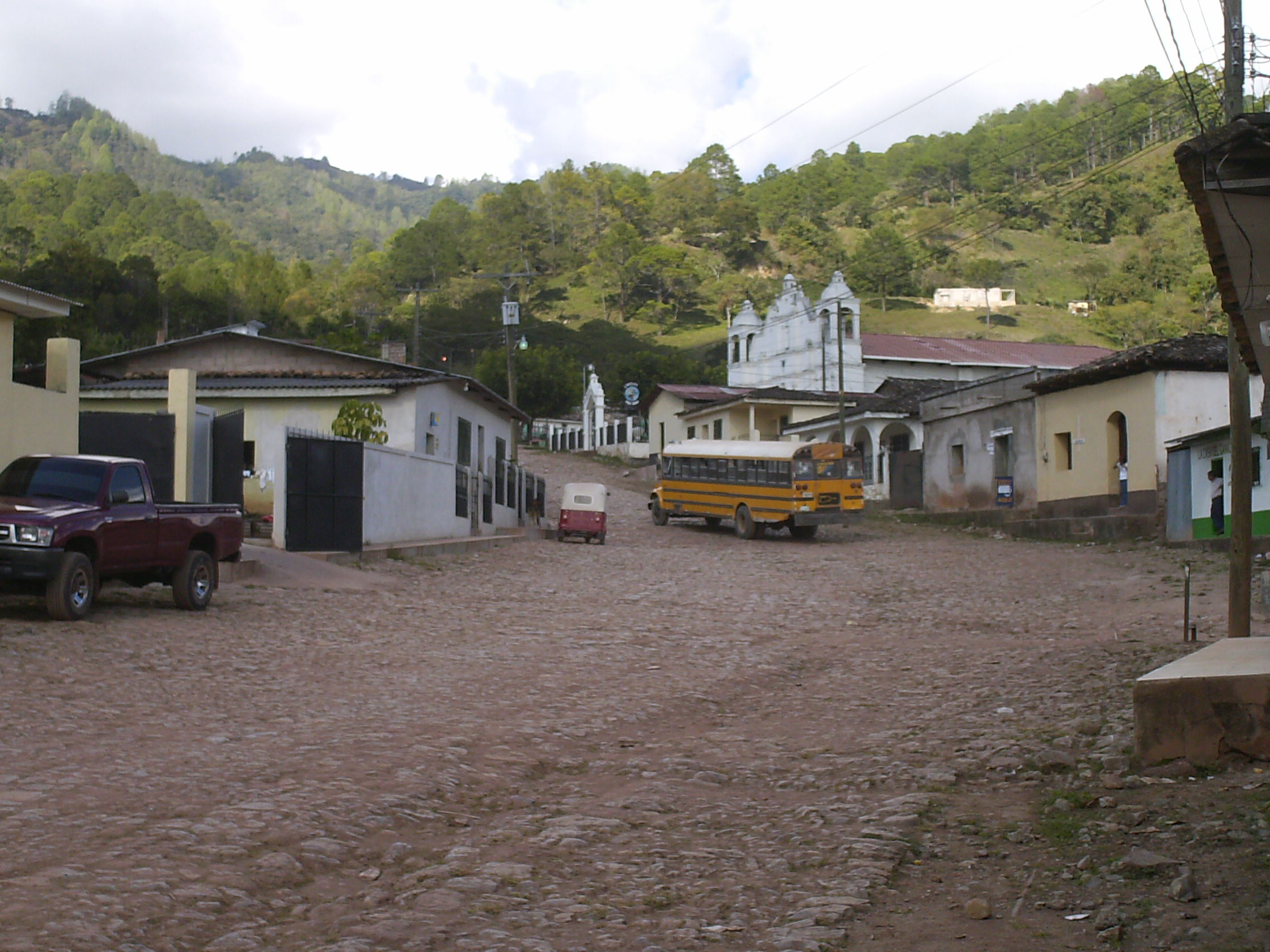

Formerly La Unión was a village called "Pueblo Nuevo", in the jurisdiction of "El Conal" (currently San Rafael). The municipality was created on 3 May 1916.

== Geography ==
La Unión is located in a plateau-like surface, guarded by dense, green mountains. Despite the apparent elevation from sea level, sub-tropical forests are present and the weather is tropical.

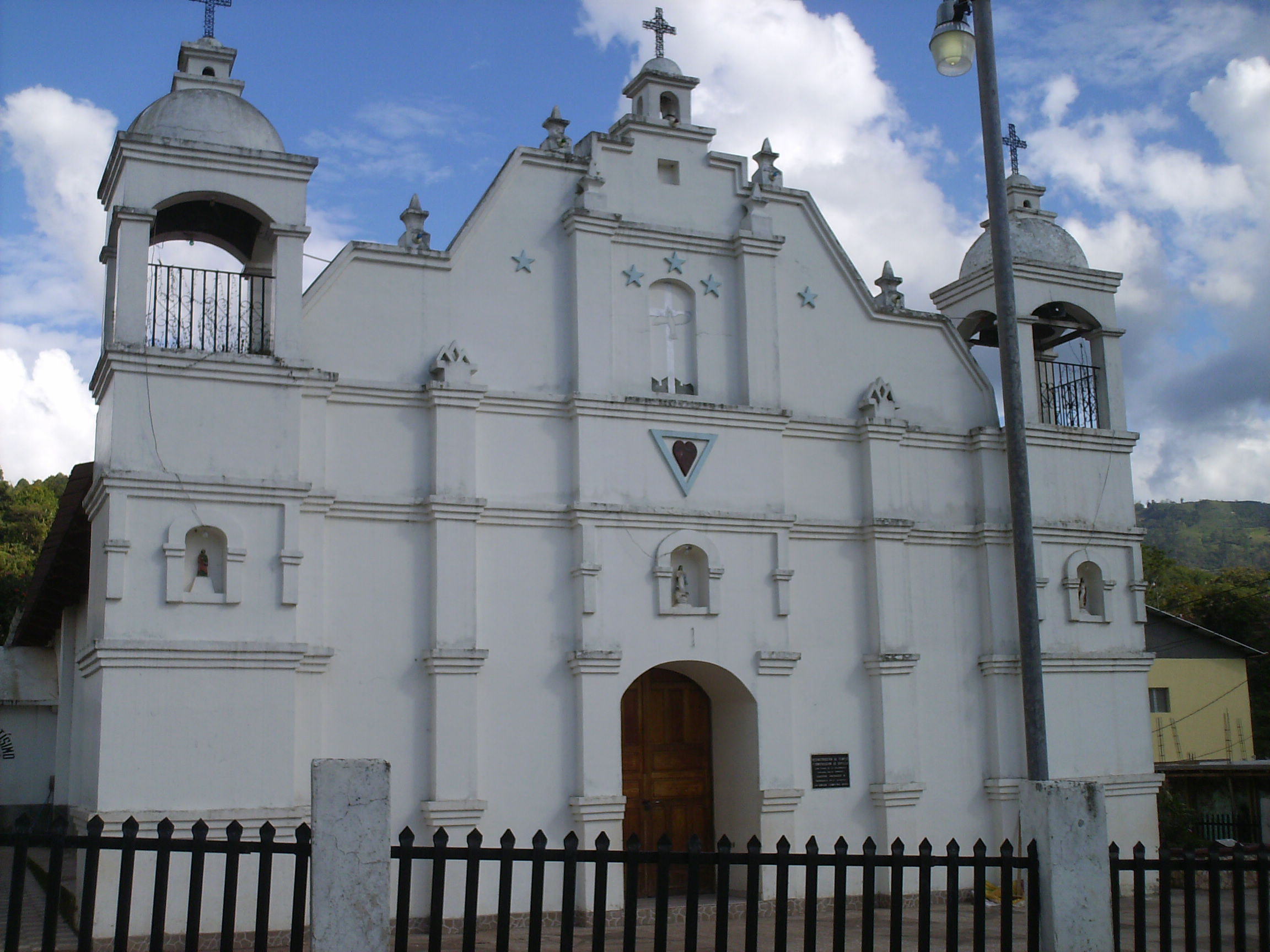
The Colonial Church

== Boundaries ==
Its boundaries are:

- North: Santa Bárbara department.
- South: San Rafael and La Iguala municipalities.
- East: Santa Bárbara department.
- West: La Iguala municipality.
- Surface Extents: 84 km^{2}

== Resources ==
This is a very prosperous town, due to coffee in both ways of plantations and gathering. The plantations are located in "Fincas" on the surrounding high mountains and the gathering in the town. Crops of Corn and Beans are indispensable. The cattle and milk products are for local consumption. There is Abundant Life Christian School, a bilingual school in La Unión, as well as public elementary schools. Electricity and mobile communications services were introduced to the region in 2006. There are several small grocery stores, or "pulperías". The transportation services assign more buses to Santa Bárbara than to Gracias.

== Population ==
The majority of people is a cross-breed of Native Americans and Spanish settlers, but in recent years there has been an increase in the population of foreigners.

- Population: In 2001 La Unión had 9,800 people. According to estimates; for 2008 it's expected to have 12,759.
- Villages: 6
- Settlements: 43

=== Demographics ===
At the time of the 2013 Honduras census, La Unión municipality had a population of 12,526. Of these, 98.46% were Mestizo, 0.85% Indigenous, 0.46% White, 0.19% Black or Afro-Honduran and 0.03% others.

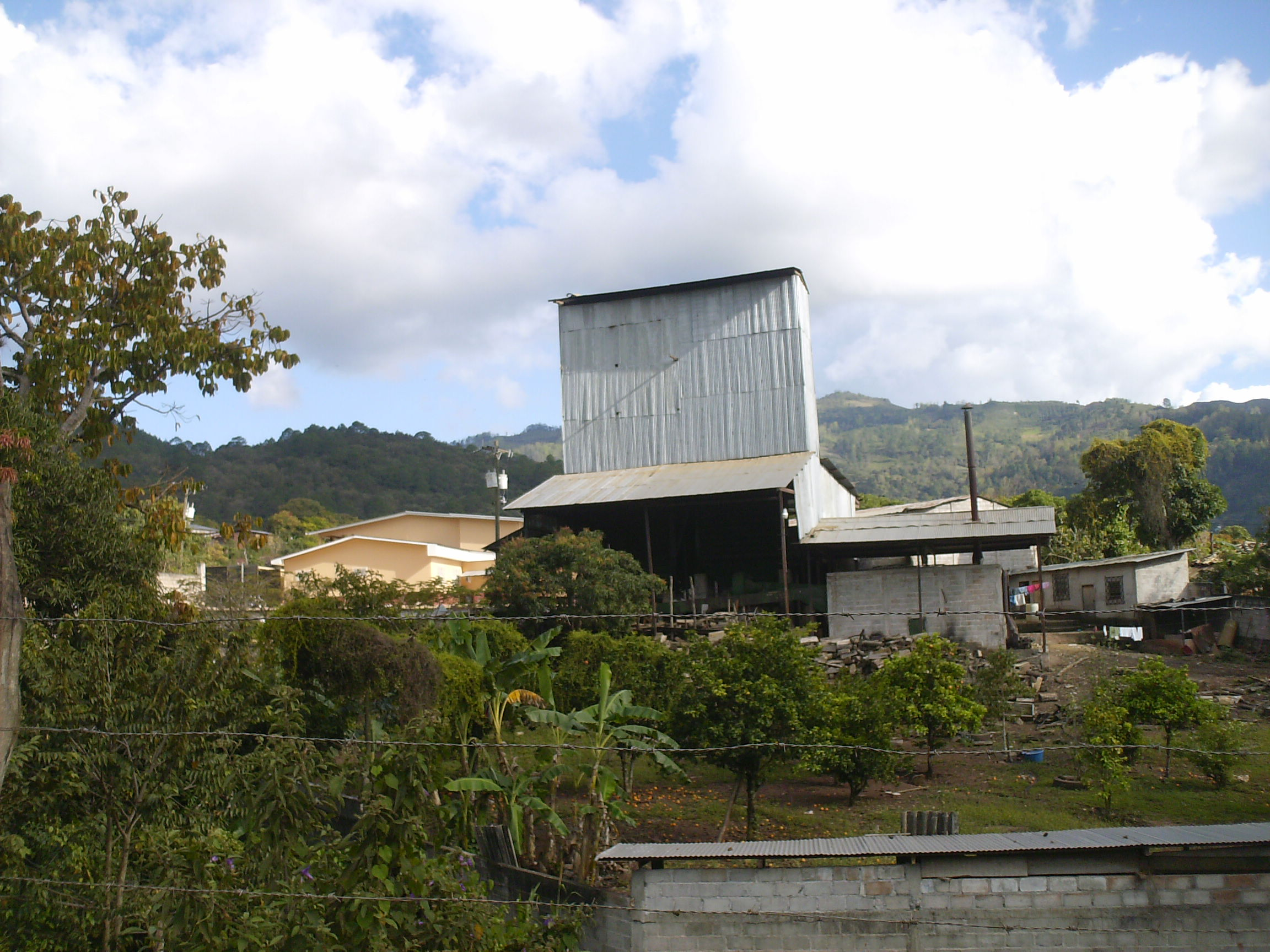
A Coffee processing plant.

== Tourism ==
La Unión is a place to visit, with mountains around it that are dense and green. It has some streets paved with rocks and a viewpoint from where visitors can see the landscape of the whole town. There are several places with internet access.

- Local Holidays: "Divina Pastora" day; 4 March.
