= La Unión, Salta =

Coordinates: 23°53′S 63°10′W

La Unión (Salta)
- Municipality and village
- Interactive map of La Unión (Salta)
- Country: Argentina
- Province: Salta Province
- Time zone: UTC−3 (ART)

La Unión (Salta) is a village and rural municipality in Salta Province in northwestern Argentina.
