= Pachas District =

Coordinates: 9.7055°S 76.7715°W

Pachas
- District
- Interactive map of Pachas
- Country: Peru
- Region: Huánuco
- Province: Dos de Mayo
- Capital: Pachas

Government
  - Mayor: Wilder Rosalino Gomez Penadillo

Area
  - Total: 264.74 km^{2} (102.22 sq mi)
- Elevation: 3,452 m (11,325 ft)

Population (2005 census)
  - Total: 8,538
  - Density: 32.25/km^{2} (83.53/sq mi)
- Time zone: UTC-5 (PET)
- UBIGEO: 100313

Pachas District is one of nine districts of the province Dos de Mayo in Peru.

== Climate ==
Climate data for Dos de Mayo, Pachas, elevation 3,414 m (11,201 ft), (1991–2020)
Month	Jan	Feb	Mar	Apr	May	Jun	Jul	Aug	Sep	Oct	Nov	Dec	Year
Mean daily maximum °C (°F)	18.9 (66.0)	18.8 (65.8)	18.5 (65.3)	18.9 (66.0)	19.4 (66.9)	19.0 (66.2)	18.9 (66.0)	19.4 (66.9)	19.1 (66.4)	18.9 (66.0)	19.5 (67.1)	18.5 (65.3)	19.0 (66.2)
Mean daily minimum °C (°F)	7.0 (44.6)	7.1 (44.8)	6.9 (44.4)	6.3 (43.3)	5.2 (41.4)	3.7 (38.7)	3.0 (37.4)	3.8 (38.8)	5.2 (41.4)	6.2 (43.2)	6.4 (43.5)	6.8 (44.2)	5.6 (42.1)
Average precipitation mm (inches)	121.2 (4.77)	140.8 (5.54)	150.0 (5.91)	73.9 (2.91)	35.0 (1.38)	8.3 (0.33)	9.3 (0.37)	13.5 (0.53)	30.1 (1.19)	66.4 (2.61)	85.8 (3.38)	129.5 (5.10)	863.8 (34.02)
Source: National Meteorology and Hydrology Service of Peru
