= Marías District =

Coordinates: 9.6163°S 76.7080°W

Marías
- District
- Interactive map of Marías
- Country: Peru
- Region: Huánuco
- Province: Dos de Mayo
- Founded: May 12, 1962
- Capital: Marías

Government
  - Mayor: Grover Lucio Vasquez Salazar

Area
  - Total: 608.05 km^{2} (234.77 sq mi)
- Elevation: 3,484 m (11,430 ft)

Population (2005 census)
  - Total: 7,017
  - Density: 11.54/km^{2} (29.89/sq mi)
- Time zone: UTC-5 (PET)
- UBIGEO: 100311

Marías District is one of nine districts of the province Dos de Mayo in Peru.

== Geography ==
Some of the highest mountains of the district are listed below:

- Aquy P'itiq
- Chuskuqucha
- Hanka Punta
- Hanka Wasi
- Hatun Punta
- Hatun P'unqu
- Kimsaqucha
- Kushuru
- Khuchi Mach'ay
- Maray
- Pampa Wasi
- Puka Hirka
- P'itiq
- Qiwllaqucha
- Quriqucha
- Riku Hirka
- Saqra Waqra
- Tikti Punta
- Tuna Kancha
- Ukru Wayin
- Wamash Punta
- Wank'amayu
- Wank'a Ukru Punta
- Wayta Hirka Punta
- Wiru Wiru
- Yana Mach'ay

== Ethnic groups ==
The people in the district are mainly indigenous citizens of Quechua descent. Quechua is the language which the majority of the population (80.45%) learnt to speak in childhood, 19.28% of the residents started speaking using the Spanish language (2007 Peru Census).

== See also ==
- Qiwllaqucha
