= Sillapata District =

Coordinates: 9.7584°S 76.7756°W

Sillapata
- District
- Interactive map of Sillapata
- Country: Peru
- Region: Huánuco
- Province: Dos de Mayo
- Founded: September 18, 1951
- Capital: Sillapata

Government
  - Mayor: Nireo Naupay Aquino

Area
  - Total: 70.53 km^{2} (27.23 sq mi)
- Elevation: 3,438 m (11,280 ft)

Population (2005 census)
  - Total: 3,291
  - Density: 46.66/km^{2} (120.9/sq mi)
- Time zone: UTC-5 (PET)
- UBIGEO: 100322

Sillapata District is one of nine districts of the province Dos de Mayo in Peru.
