= Wank'a Ukru Punta =

Mountain in Peru

- Location within Peru

Highest point
- Elevation: 4,410 m (14,470 ft)
- Coordinates: 9°37′04″S 76°29′19″W

Geography
- Location: Huánuco Region
- Parent range: Andes

Wank'a Ukru Punta (Quechua wank'a rock, ukru hole, pit, hollow, punta peak; ridge; first, before, in front of, "red mountain", also spelled Huancaucro Punta) is a 4,410-metre-high (14,470 ft) mountain in the Andes of Peru. It is located in the Huánuco Region, Dos de Mayo Province, Marías District. Wank'a Ukru Punta lies northwest of Tikti Punta and north of a lake named Saqsaqucha ("multi-colored lake").
