= La Unión (ship) =

19th century ship

La Unión was a paddle-wheel steamer used from 1855 to 1861 to transport Mayans enslaved during the War of the Castes from Mexico to Cuba. In September 1861, she sank near the port of Sisal, Yucatán, when her boiler exploded while she was on the way to Cuba. The shipwreck was found in 2017.
