= Yanas District =

Coordinates: 9.1599°S 76.8003°W

Yanas
- District
- Interactive map of Yanas
- Country: Peru
- Region: Huánuco
- Province: Dos de Mayo
- Founded: September 12, 1921
- Capital: Yanas

Government
  - Mayor: Heli Victor Garay Inga

Area
  - Total: 36.31 km^{2} (14.02 sq mi)
- Elevation: 3,470 m (11,380 ft)

Population (2005 census)
  - Total: 3,815
  - Density: 105.1/km^{2} (272.1/sq mi)
- Time zone: UTC-5 (PET)
- UBIGEO: 100323

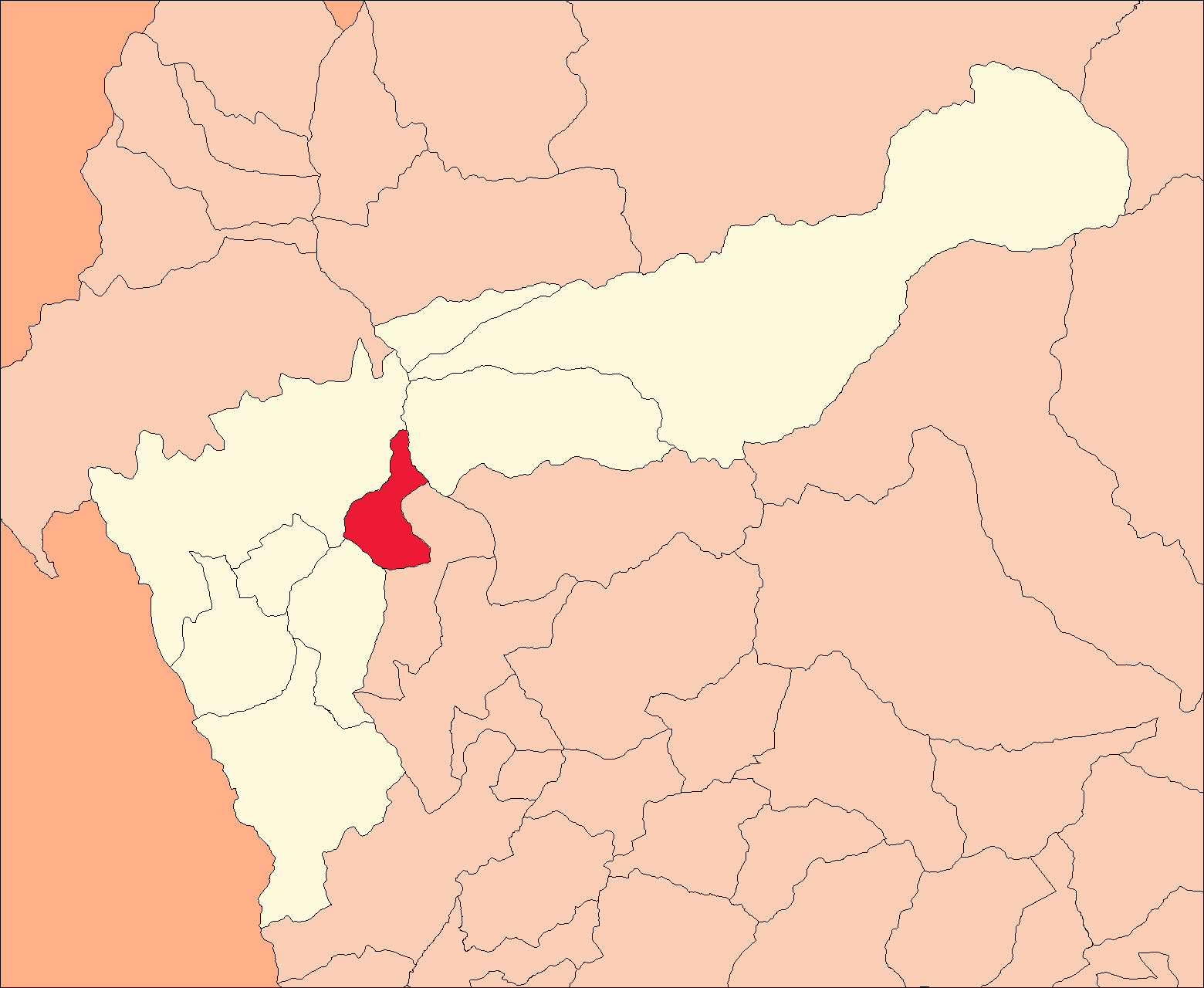
Yanas District (in red) within the province Dos de Mayo (in cream)

Yanas District is one of nine districts of the province Dos de Mayo in Peru.

== Ethnic groups ==
The people in the district are mainly indigenous citizens of Quechua descent. Quechua is the language which the majority of the population (53.13%) learnt to speak in childhood, 46.59% of the residents started speaking using the Spanish language (2007 Peru Census).
