= Ripán District =

Coordinates: 9.7997°S 76.8132°W

Ripán
- District
- Interactive map of Ripán
- Country: Peru
- Region: Huánuco
- Province: Dos de Mayo
- Founded: December 31, 1958
- Capital: Ripán

Government
  - Mayor: Wilder Nilson Espinoza Rojas

Area
  - Total: 75.04 km^{2} (28.97 sq mi)
- Elevation: 3,204 m (10,512 ft)

Population (2005 census)
  - Total: 6,156
  - Density: 82.04/km^{2} (212.5/sq mi)
- Time zone: UTC-5 (PET)
- UBIGEO: 100317

Ripán District is one of nine districts of the province Dos de Mayo in Peru.
