= Saqra Waqra (Dos de Mayo) =

Mountain in Peru

- Location within Peru

Highest point
- Elevation: 4,000 m (13,000 ft)
- Coordinates: 9°35′44″S 76°29′33″W

Geography
- Location: Huánuco Region
- Parent range: Andes

Saqra Waqra (Quechua saqra malignant, pernicious, bad, bad tempered, wicked; restless; devil, synonym of supay, waqra horn, "devil's horn", also spelled Sagra Huagra) is a mountain in the Andes of Peru which reaches a height of approximately 4,000 m (13,000 ft). It is located in the Huánuco Region, Dos de Mayo Province, Marías District. Saqra Waqra lies southwest of a lake named Ñat'inqucha.
