= La Unión District, Dos de Mayo =

Coordinates: 9.7586°S 76.7758°W

La Unión District
- District
- Interactive map of La Unión District
- Country: Peru
- Region: Huánuco
- Province: Dos de Mayo
- Founded: January 2, 1857
- Capital: La Unión

Government
  - Mayor: Luis Maldonado Rivera

Area
  - Total: 167.1 km^{2} (64.5 sq mi)
- Elevation: 3,204 m (10,512 ft)

Population (2017)
  - Total: 6,634
  - Density: 39.70/km^{2} (102.8/sq mi)
- Time zone: UTC-5 (PET)
- UBIGEO: 100301

La Unión District is one of nine districts found in the province Dos de Mayo in Peru.

== See also ==
- Wanuku Pampa
