= Urqumayu =

Tributary of Marañón River in Peru

Urqumayu Vizcarra
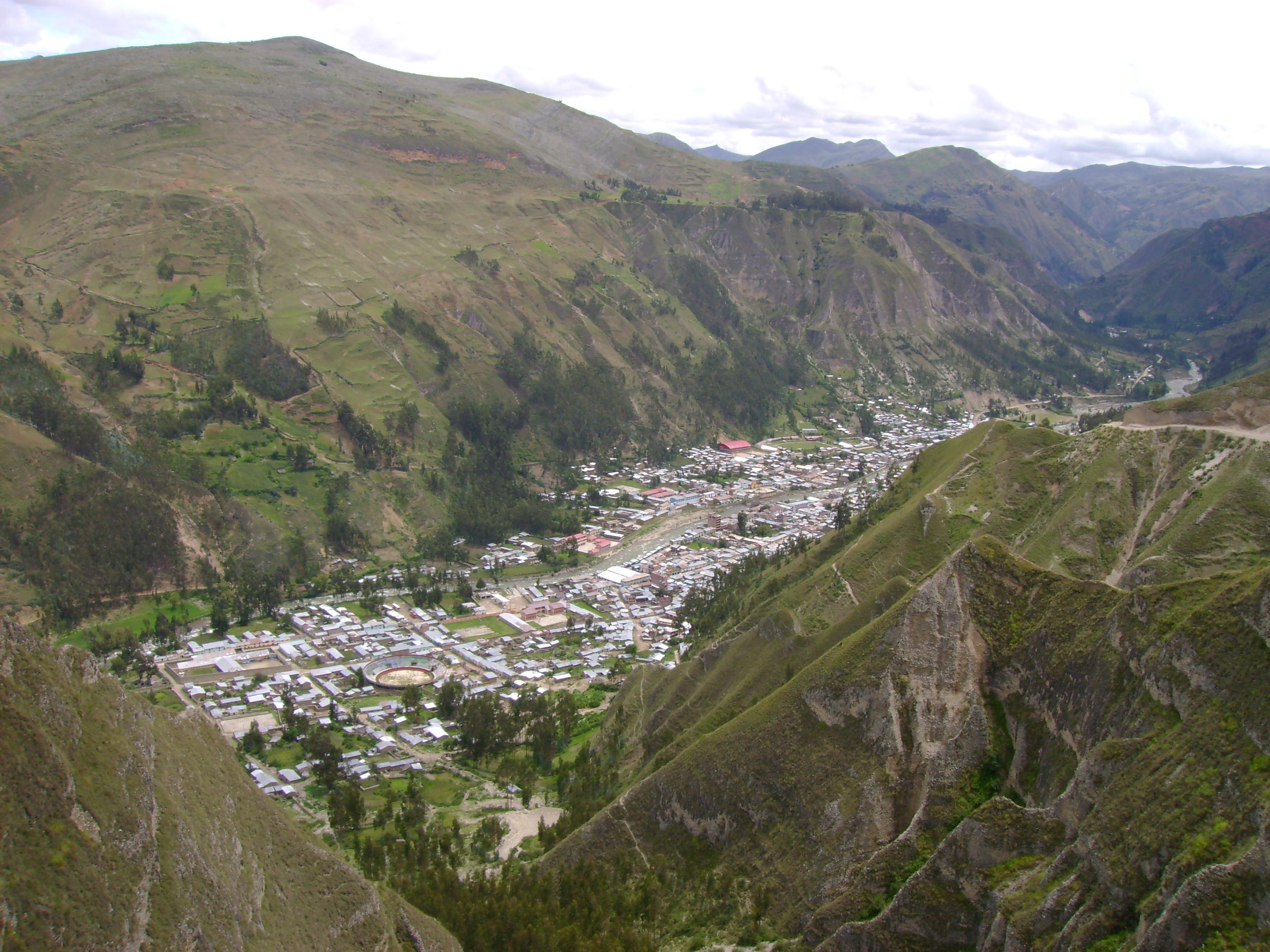
- Urqumayu in La Unión
- Etymology: Quechua

Location
- Country: Peru
- Region: Ancash Region, Huánuco Region

Physical characteristics
- Mouth: Marañón River
  - coordinates: 9°39′14″S 76°43′11″W

Urqumayu (Quechua urqu mountain / male, mayu river, "mountain river" or "male river", Hispanicized spelling Orgomayo) or Vizcarra (named after a prefect of Huánuco, Colonel Pedro C. Vizcarra) is a river in the Ancash Region and in the Huánuco Region in Peru. It is a tributary of the Marañón River.
