= San Marcos de Caiquín =

- Municipality
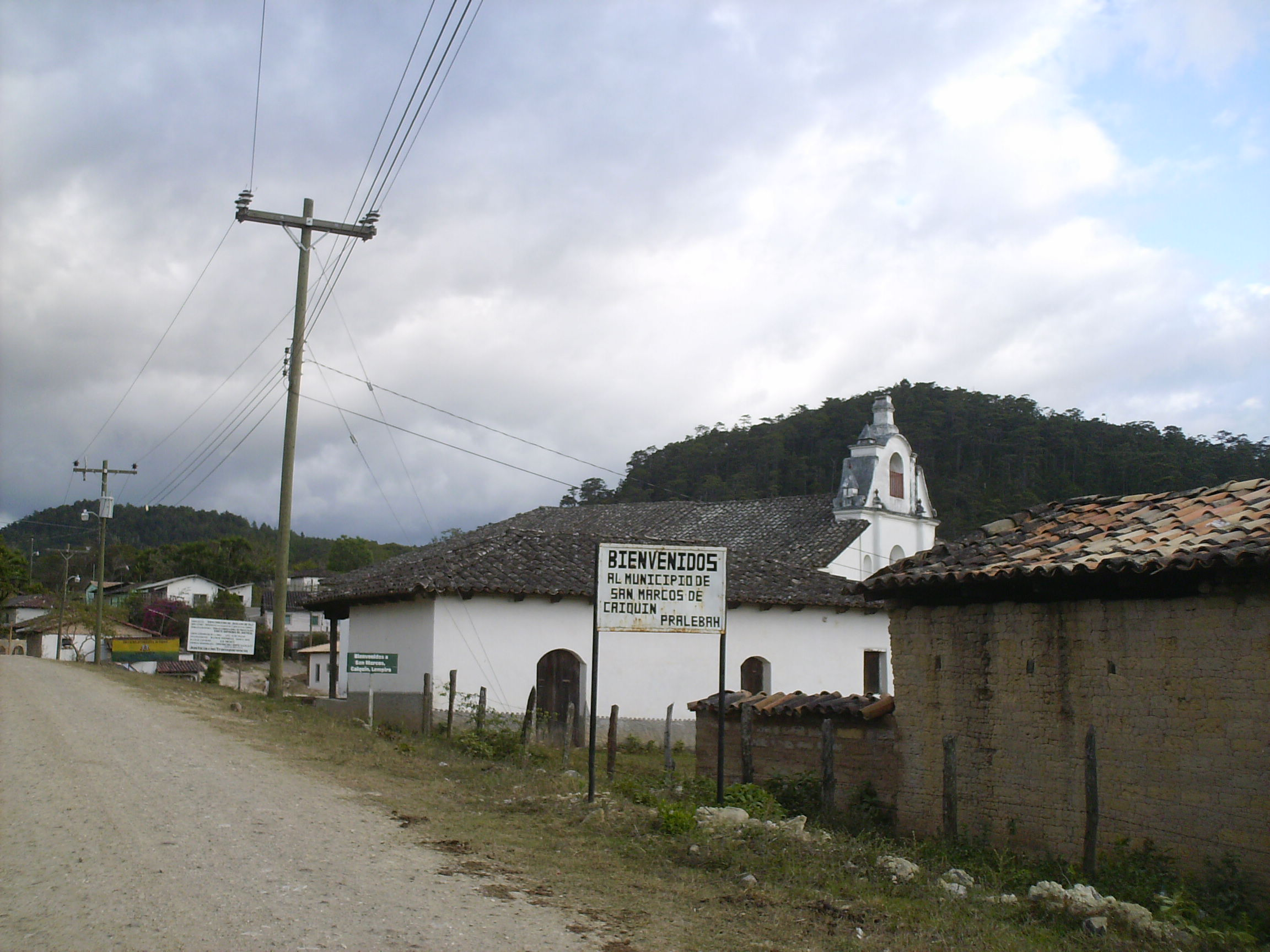
- Arriving in Town

- Location in Honduras
- Coordinates: 14°25′N 88°36′W
- Country: Honduras
- Department: Lempira
- Municipality since: 4 November 1994; 31 years ago

Area
  - Total: 94 km^{2} (36 sq mi)

Population (2015)
  - Total: 5,816
  - Density: 62/km^{2} (160/sq mi)

San Marcos de Caiquín is a municipality in the Honduran department of Lempira created November 4, 1994.

== History ==
It was created as a municipality on November 4, 1994. The "Lenca" community of San Marcos de Caiquin has historically been a village of La Campa municipality. Its inhabitants are descendants of "Lenca-Chortis" ethnic groups. Because of their cultural and economical activities, they decided to create a municipality with its own ethnic traits.

== Geography ==
The municipality capital is located at the toe of the mountain on which San Manuel Colohete is located. To be more precise, it is on a depression among some hills. These hills are covered with pine forests. On the way to this capital, it can be seen on the road the volcanic origin of the rocks and soil. In order to make it to the municipality capital, the traveler must start in the city of Gracias.

Its surface area is 94 km^{2}. It is bounded on the north by La Campa municipalities; on the south by Santa Cruz and San Andrés municipalities; on the east by Santa Cruz municipality; and on the west by San Manuel Colohete and San Sebastián municipalities.

== Resources ==
The forests provide a profitable economical activity, best of all is that the people have ecological conscience and make the most out them. Coffee plantations are the number one activity, followed by beans and corn crops. As the rest of the department, it has electricity and mobile communication services. There are several streams and wells that provide water for the people.

== Population ==
For the year 2001 the population was 4,136; and in accordance with estimates it is expected to have 5,816 inhabitants for 2015. There are 7 villages and 54 settlements.

=== Demographics ===
At the time of the 2013 Honduras census, San Marcos de Caiquín municipality had a population of 5,571. Of these, 85.62% were Indigenous (84.26% Lenca), 14.18% Mestizo, 0.18% Black or Afro-Honduran and 0.02% White.
