= Hurricane Eta =

Category 4 Atlantic hurricane in 2020

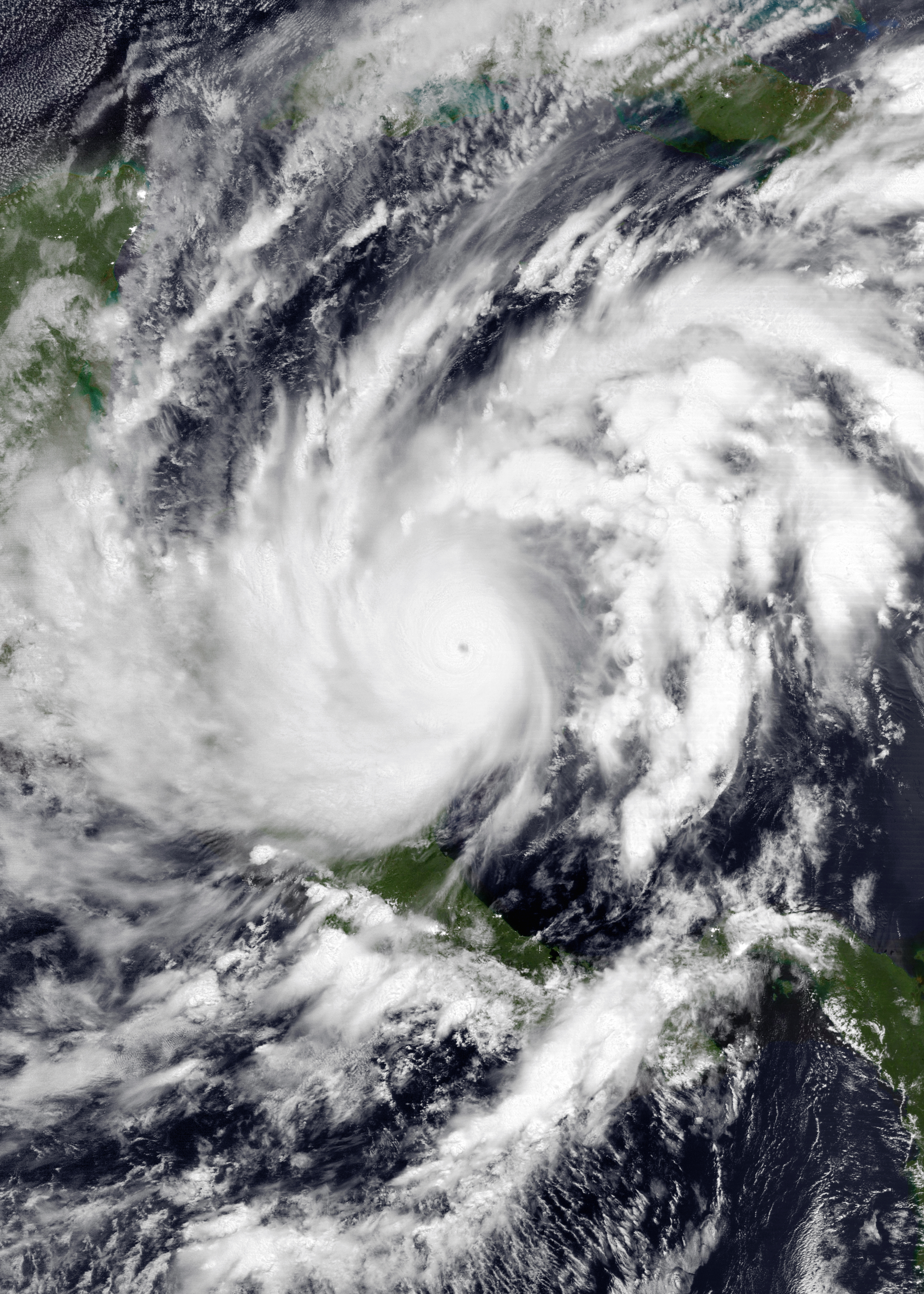
- Eta at peak intensity just east of Nicaragua early on November 3

Meteorological history
- Formed: October 31, 2020
- Extratropical: November 13, 2020
- Dissipated: November 14, 2020

Category 4 major hurricane
- 1-minute sustained (SSHWS/NWS)
- Highest winds: 150 mph (240 km/h)
- Lowest pressure: 922 mbar (hPa); 27.23 inHg

Overall effects
- Fatalities: 189+
- Missing: 120
- Damage: $7.24 billion (2020 USD)
- Areas affected: San Andrés; Jamaica; Central America; Cayman Islands; Cuba; The Bahamas; Southeastern United States
- IBTrACS
- Part of the 2020 Atlantic hurricane season

Hurricane Eta was a deadly and erratic tropical cyclone that devastated parts of Central America in early November 2020. The record-tying twenty-eighth named storm, thirteenth hurricane, and sixth major hurricane of the extremely active 2020 Atlantic hurricane season, Eta originated from a vigorous tropical wave in the eastern Caribbean Sea on October 31. The system rapidly organized as it progressed west, with the cyclone ultimately becoming a Category 4 hurricane on November 3. With a peak intensity of 150 mph (240 km/h) and 922 millibars (922 hPa; 27.2 inHg), it was the third most intense November Atlantic hurricane on record, behind the 1932 Cuba hurricane and Hurricane Iota, the latter of which formed just two weeks later in the same area. Some weakening took place as the system made landfall near Puerto Cabezas, Nicaragua, late that same day. Eta rapidly weakened to a tropical depression and briefly degenerated to a remnant low as it meandered across Central America for two days, before regenerating into a tropical depression and moving north over water. The storm later reorganized over the Caribbean as it accelerated toward Cuba on November 7, making a second landfall on the next day. Over the next five days, the system moved erratically, making a third landfall in the Florida Keys, on November 9, before slowing down and making a counterclockwise loop in the southern Gulf of Mexico, just off the coast of Cuba, with the storm's intensity fluctuating along the way. After briefly regaining hurricane strength on November 11, the system weakened back to a tropical storm once more, before making a fourth landfall on Florida on the next day, and proceeding to accelerate northeastward. Eta subsequently became extratropical on November 13, before dissipating off the coast of the Eastern United States on the next day.

Hurricane and tropical storm watches and warnings were issued along the coast of Honduras and Northeastern Nicaragua as Eta approached. Once inland, Eta produced torrential rainfall and catastrophic wind, flood and storm surge damage across Central America. Eta was responsible for at least 175 deaths and over 100 others missing, and an estimated $8.3 billion (2020 USD) in storm related damages—primarily in Central America—were reported as of December 2020. Once the system began to reorganize in the Caribbean, tropical storm watches were issued on November 5, in the Cayman Islands. More watches were issued in parts of Cuba, the northwestern Bahamas, and South Florida. Eta brought heavy rainfall and gusty winds to the Cayman Islands and Cuba, the latter of which was already dealing with overflowing rivers that prompted evacuations. Heavy rainfall and tropical-storm force winds were recorded across all of the Florida Keys, South Florida and the southern half of Central Florida, bringing widespread flooding. Eta's second approach and landfall brought storm surge and gusty winds to the west coast of Central Florida and supplemental rainfall to northern Florida. Moisture from the storm also combined with a cold front further to the north bringing heavy rainfall and flash flooding to the Carolinas and Virginia.

Relief efforts for those affected by the storm were extensive and widespread, involving several countries. Central America was already facing a humanitarian crisis which was further impacted by Hurricane Eta. Approximately 2.5 million were affected by the storm, including 1.7 million in Honduras. Many Emergency Response Units were to be dispatched globally to help support affected people. About 98 tons of food and water were given to Nicaragua and Honduras from Panama. People left homeless were moved to various shelters after the storm had passed. Donations worth millions of USD have been given to affected countries to help recoveries. Two weeks after Eta, relief efforts were greatly hampered by Hurricane Iota, which further worsened the disaster in the region.

== Meteorological history ==
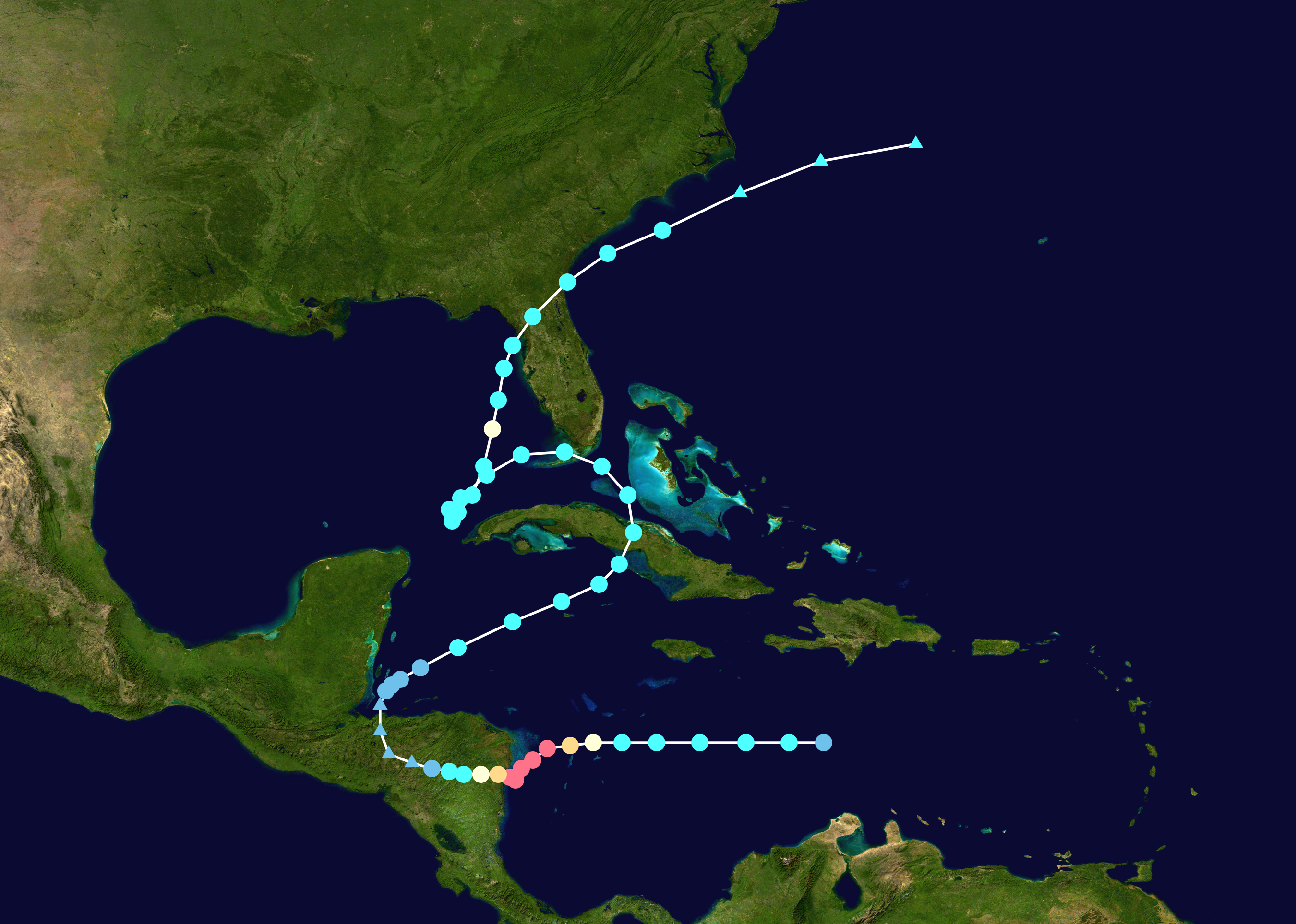
Map plotting the storm's track and intensity, according to the Saffir–Simpson scale Map key Saffir–Simpson scale Tropical depression (≤38 mph, ≤62 km/h) Tropical storm (39–73 mph, 63–118 km/h) Category 1 (74–95 mph, 119–153 km/h) Category 2 (96–110 mph, 154–177 km/h) Category 3 (111–129 mph, 178–208 km/h) Category 4 (130–156 mph, 209–251 km/h) Category 5 (≥157 mph, ≥252 km/h) Unknown Storm type Tropical cyclone Subtropical cyclone Extratropical cyclone, remnant low, tropical disturbance, or monsoon depression

Eta developed from a tropical wave that moved off the west coast of Africa around October 22. The system slowly moved westward across the tropical Atlantic, accompanied by a large area of disorganized cloudiness, showers, and thunderstorms. The National Hurricane Center (NHC) began monitoring the disturbance for potential development into a tropical cyclone on October 29, as it moved across the Lesser Antilles and into the eastern Caribbean Sea. On October 30, the disturbance moved west-northwestward and gradually became better organized. This allowed for deep convection to become more consolidated going into October 31. By 18:00 UTC on that day, the system's deep convection had consolidated and a low-level circulation had become sufficiently well-defined, marking the formation of Tropical Depression Twenty-Nine centered about 105 mi (169 km) south of Pedernales, Dominican Republic. The depression strengthened into Tropical Storm Eta by 00:00 UTC on November 1, becoming the earliest 28th tropical or subtropical storm on record in an Atlantic hurricane season, surpassing the old mark of December 30, set by Tropical Storm Zeta in 2005.

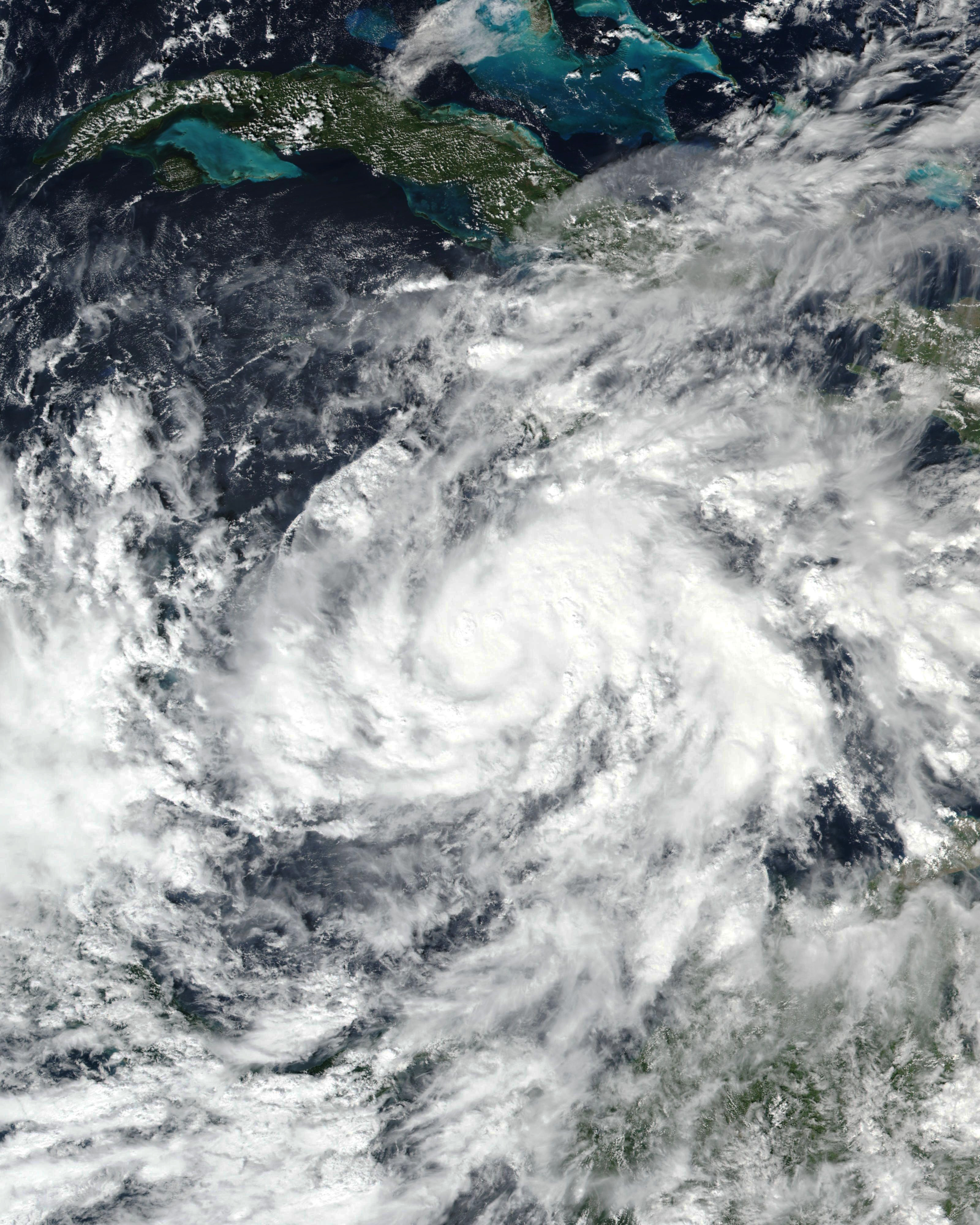
Tropical Storm Eta at the beginning of its rapid intensification phase east of Nicaragua on November 1.

Steered westward by a low-to-mid-level ridge that extended from the subtropical Atlantic southwestward to Cuba and The Bahamas, Eta slowly organized throughout the day as a central dense overcast began to form atop its low-level center. Surrounded by an environment of low vertical shear and high sea surface temperatures, Eta began to explosively intensify on November 2. It became a hurricane by 06:00 UTC that day, while located about 310 mi (500 km) south of Grand Cayman. Nine hours later, it strengthened into a high-end Category 2 hurricane as a small pinhole eye became apparent in visible satellite imagery. Its sustained winds increased to Category 4 intensity by 18:00 UTC that day, an increase of 50 mph (80 km/h) in about 12 hours. Eta's maximum sustained winds peaked at 150 mph (240 km/h) at 00:00 UTC on November 3; at the same time, the storm had a central pressure of 929 mbar (27.4 inHg). Eta then begun to slow down and turn southwestward in response to a mid-level ridge over the western Gulf of Mexico and Mexico. Even so, its maximum sustained winds remained unchanged through 06:00 UTC, during which time its minimum pressure fell to 922 mbar (27.2 inHg), with the storm reaching its peak intensity. The Washington Post reported that several meteorologists believed that Eta peaked as a Category 5 hurricane based on satellite imagery estimates, as well as a lack of aircraft observations due to several mechanical issues; however, in their post-season report, the NHC determined that Eta peaked as a 150 mph (240 km/h)-Category 4 hurricane. Despite remaining in a very favorable environment, Eta began to weaken soon thereafter, due to an eyewall replacement cycle. After drifting just offshore of the Caribbean coast of Nicaragua for several hours on November 3, the hurricane made landfall just as it completed its eyewall replacement cycle at 21:00 UTC about 15 mi (24 km) south-southwest of Puerto Cabezas, Nicaragua, with maximum sustained winds of 140 mph (230 km/h). A storm surge of 26–33 feet (7.9–10.1 m) was reported at landfall. Once inland, the hurricane rapidly weakened as it moved slowly westward over northern Nicaragua, diminishing to Category 2 intensity three hours after landfall, and to a tropical storm by 12:00 UTC on November 4. Twelve hours later, around 00:00 UTC on November 5, Eta weakened to a tropical depression while its center was located about 80 mi (130 km) east of Tegucigalpa, Honduras. By 06:00 UTC that morning, the storm degenerated into a remnant low, though it maintained its low-level vorticity maximum. Operationally, the NHC continued issuing advisories on "Tropical Depression Eta" due to uncertainties about whether or not the surface circulation had dissipated.

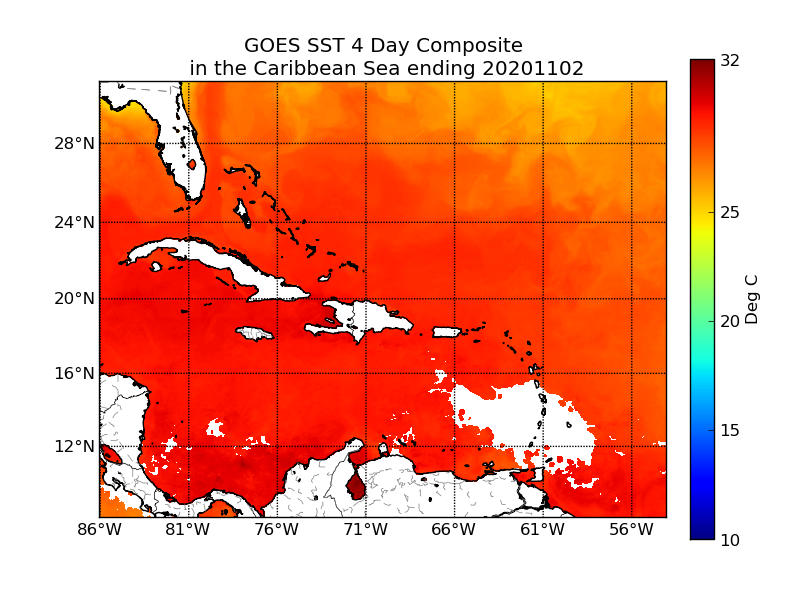
Sea surface temperatures of 30 °C (86 °F) in the Caribbean Sea through November 2 allowed Eta to explosively intensify.

The remnants of Eta emerged into the Gulf of Honduras around 00:00 UTC on November 6, and then, six hours later, regenerated into a tropical depression east of Belize, due to the steering influence of a developing mid- to upper-level trough over the Gulf of Mexico. The system re-strengthened into a tropical storm by 00:00 UTC on November 7 and accelerated east-northeastward later that day. Despite the effects of southwesterly vertical wind shear and upper-level dry air approaching the inner core from the west, the storm attained an intensity of 65 mph (105 km/h) at 00:00 UTC on November. It then moved counterclockwise along the periphery of a broad deep-layer cyclonic circulation. This movement took Eta across the southern coast of Cuba, about 30 mi (48 km) south-southeast of Sancti Spíritus, at 09:00 UTC on November 8, with winds of 65 mph (105 km/h). It emerged off the north coast of Cuba into the Straits of Florida six hours later. There, it began to re-strengthen again, and briefly gained a mid-level eye feature, as it turned sharply northwestward around the northeastern side of an upper-level low that had formed over the extreme northwestern Caribbean Sea near the Isle of Youth.

The storm continued to move along this course through early on November 9. Eta made its third landfall around 04:00 UTC that morning near Lower Matecumbe Key in the Florida Keys with sustained winds of near 65 mph (105 km/h), and then moved westward into the Gulf of Mexico. Eta then turned southwestward under the influence of a strong deep-layer ridge across the Gulf of Mexico, Florida, and near the East Coast of the U.S. Its overall appearance in satellite imagery from that morning was fragmented, with inner-core convection having become shallow and broken due to dry air. This caused the storm to weaken and its radius of gale-force winds to shrink. It made a cyclonic loop to the north of the western tip of Cuba on November 10, with little change in strength. It then moved northward on November 11, briefly regaining hurricane intensity around 12:00 UTC, and simultaneously reaching its second peak intensity with sustained winds of 75 mph (121 km/h) and a barometric pressure of 983 mbar (29.0 inHg). The eye feature quickly dissipated, weakening Eta back to a tropical storm six hours later, when its center was located about 115 mi (185 km) south-southwest of Tarpon Springs, Florida. It then turned north-northeastward and made a final landfall near Cedar Key, Florida at 09:00 UTC on November 12, with sustained winds of 50 mph (80 km/h). The storm further degraded and weakened over land as it accelerated northeastward, eventually emerging over the waters of the Atlantic near the Florida–Georgia border at 18:00 UTC that same day. The system regained some of its lost intensity once back over water and it accelerated east-northeastward as it began its extratropical transition. By 09:00 UTC on November 13, while located near the coast of the Carolinas, it became an extratropical low. On the next day, Eta was absorbed by another frontal system to the north.

== Preparations ==
=== Central America ===
Early on November 1, the governments of Honduras and Nicaragua issued Hurricane Watches and Warnings for the northeastern coast of Honduras from Punta Patuca to the Honduras–Nicaragua border and the northeastern coast of Nicaragua from the Honduras–Nicaragua border to Puerto Cabezas, respectively. Later that day, a hurricane warning was issued from the Honduras–Nicaragua border to Sandy Bay Sirpi while a tropical storm warning was issued for areas from Punta Patuca to the Honduras–Nicaragua border. A tropical storm watch was also issued from west of Punta Patuca westward to Punta Castilla late that same day.

==== Nicaragua ====
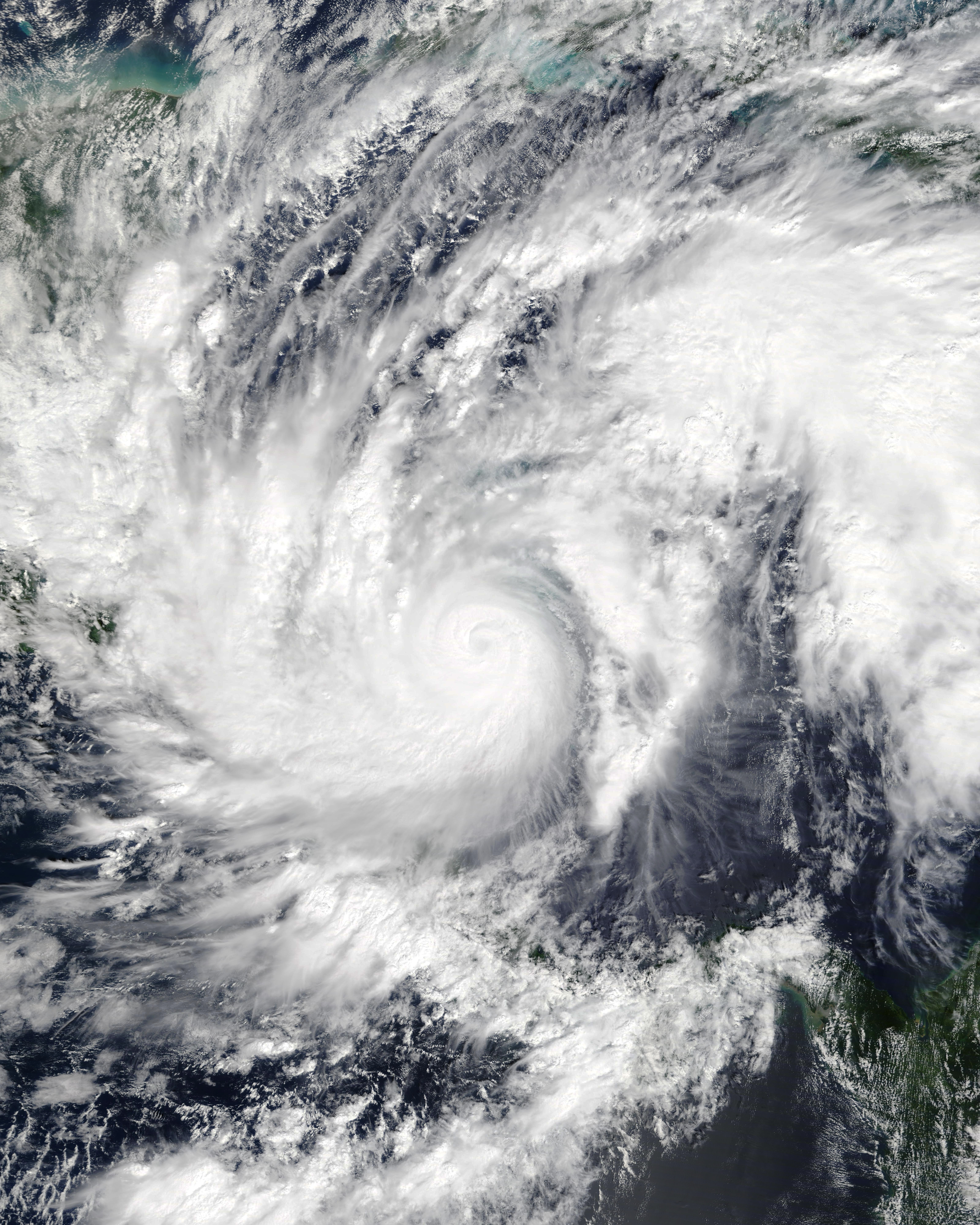
Hurricane Eta shortly before landfall in Nicaragua on November 3. Its rainbands covered most of Central America.

With the threat of 14–21 feet (4.3–6.4 m) of storm surge along the coastline, Nicaraguan President Daniel Ortega issued a yellow alert for the departments of Jinotega, Nueva Segovia, and the North Caribbean Autonomous Region on October 31, which were upgraded to a red alert by November 2. Residents in coastal communities were advised to evacuate as supplies, including 88 tons of food, sleeping bags, hygiene kits, and plastic, were delivered to Puerto Cabezas according Nicaragua's National System for the Prevention, Mitigation and Attention of Disaster. The Nicaraguan Navy helped evacuate more than 3,000 families from offshore islands to Puerto Cabezas as residents in the city waited in long lines to access cash machines while getting supplies. Just before the storm's arrival, the Nicaraguan Army moved its Humanitarian and SAR Unit (Unidad Humanitaria y de Rescate - UHR in Spanish) to Puerto Cabezas, to help in search and rescue efforts that would occur due to Eta. More than 10,000 people sought refuge at shelters in Puerto Cabezas and surrounding villages.

==== Honduras ====
A red alert was placed for Honduran departments of Gracias a Dios, Colón, Atlántida, Islas de la Bahía, and Olancho while a yellow alert was declared for Santa Bárbara, Francisco Morazán, Comayagua, El Paraíso, Yoro, and Cortés. A green alert was issued for Copán, Ocotepeque, Lempira, Intibucá, La Paz, Valle, and Choluteca. The Honduran Air Force prepared two planes to send 4,000 pounds of food to La Mosquitia, Gracias a Dios. The National Police of Honduras was tasked to advise passengers of roadways blocked by a landslide or flooding. More than 20,000 pounds of food was stored at the Offices of Risk Management and National Contingencies in San Pedro Sula, ahead of the storm. The national "feriado morazánico" holiday was also canceled.

==== El Salvador ====
The Civil Protection Directorate of El Salvador evacuated residents in Tecoluca after setting up 1,152 shelters across the country. The Autonomous Executive Port Commission considered temporarily closing the El Salvador International Airport due to Eta. The Executive Hydroelectric Commission of the Lempa River cleared pipes to prevent flooding in communities along the river.

==== Costa Rica ====
Costa Rica's National Meteorological Institute forecast widespread rainfall in association with the outer bands of Eta, primarily along the Pacific coastline. With flooding beginning during the overnight hours of November 2, the National Emergency Commission (NCE) established multiple shelters for evacuees. The agency planned to set up three types of shelters due to the COVID-19 pandemic: infected persons, suspected infected persons, and non-infected persons. Landslides were expected in many areas due to saturated soils.

==== Panama ====
Although not in the direct path of Eta, the fringe effects of the hurricane were expected to cause disruptions in Panama. Seagoing vessels were alerted to dangerous swells in Caribbean waters along with wind gusts up to 37 mph (60 km/h). The Ministry of Public Works advised residents to stay vigilant for possible flooding and landslides. MPO road crews were dispatched to ensure highways remained clear for travel.

==== Belize ====
As flooding was a major threat because of heavy rainfalls, a flood warning was issued for all of Belize in preparation for Eta as the National Emergency Management Organization urged residents to evacuate.

=== Caribbean ===
==== Cayman Islands ====
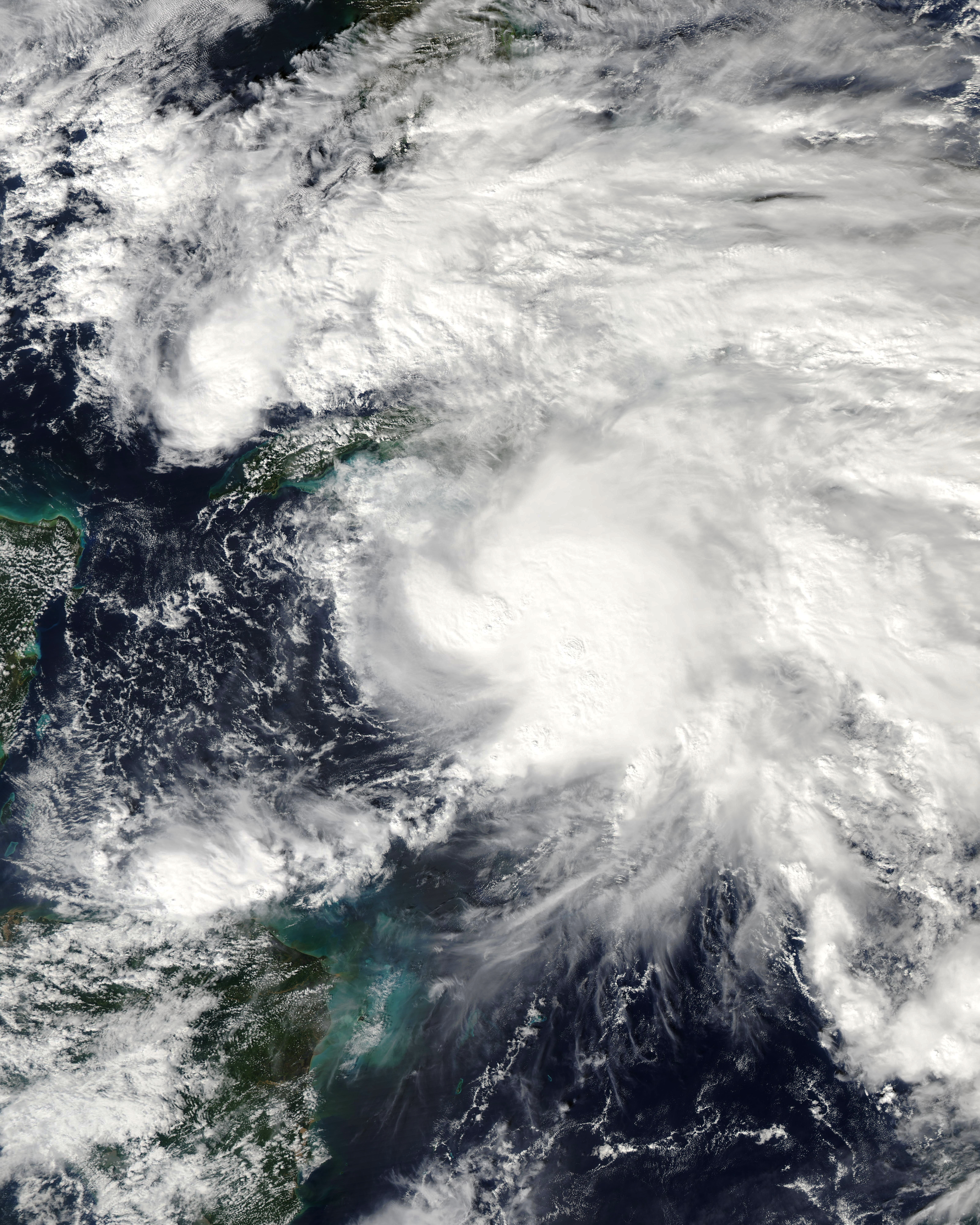
Eta shortly after regaining tropical storm status, approaching the Cayman Islands and Cuba on November 7.

As the projected path for Eta showed the system coming close to Grand Cayman, a tropical storm watch and a flood warning were put into effect for Grand Cayman and all islands of the Cayman Islands on November 5. The watch became tropical storm warning the following day as Tropical Storm Eta moved closer. Government schools were closed in the islands, as were ports in George Town, Grand Cayman and Creek, Creek, Cayman Brac.

==== Cuba ====
On November 6, the Government of Cuba issued a tropical storm watch for the provinces of Camaguey, Ciego de Avila, Sancti Spiritus, Villa Clara, Cienfuegos, Matanzas, La Habana, Havana, Pinar del Rio, and the Isle of Youth. Later that day, these were upgraded to tropical storm warnings in some provinces.

=== The Bahamas ===
Late on November 6, the government of the Bahamas has issued a Tropical Storm Watch for its northwestern islands, including: the Abacos, Andros, Berry Islands, Bimini, Eleuthera, Grand Bahama, and New Providence. The next day, these watches were upgraded to tropical storm warnings.

=== United States ===
==== Florida ====
On November 6, tropical storm watches were issued for the Florida Keys and parts of the coast of the Florida peninsula. The next day, these were upgraded to tropical storm warnings in the Florida Keys and the southern tip of the peninsula. On November 7, Hurricane Watches and Warnings were issued parallelly for much of the Florida peninsula and both Tropical Storm Warnings and Watches were extended further north. Residents of mobile homes and other vulnerable structures in the Florida Keys were told to evacuate ahead of Tropical Storm Eta as a state of emergency was declared in several counties including Monroe and Miami-Dade. Later, Hurricane Warnings were issued for the Florida Keys. The National Park Service shut down Everglades National Park, Biscayne National Park and Dry Tortugas National Park during the storm's passage. All the warnings for Florida were cancelled by November 9, only to have more issued the next day along the western side of the state as Eta changed directions.

== Impact ==
Deaths and damage by territory
Country/Territory	Fatalities	Missing	Damage (2020 USD)	Refs
Belize	0		Unknown	
Cayman Islands	0		Unknown	
Colombia	0		$777,000	
Cuba	0		Unknown	
Costa Rica	2		$16.5 million	
El Salvador	1		Unknown	
Guatemala	60	96	≥ $386 million	
Honduras	74	8	$5 billion	
Mexico	27	4	Unknown	
Nicaragua	2		≥ $178 million	
Panama	19	12	$11 million	
United States	10		≥ $1.65 billion	
Totals:	175+	120	≥ $7.24 billion	

Eta's intensity and catastrophic rainfall at the beginning of its lifetime followed by its erratic path afterwards bought widespread impacts across Central America, the Greater Antilles, and Florida.

=== South America ===
==== Colombia ====
Despite passing north of the San Andrés Island, part of the archipelago of San Andrés, Providencia and Santa Catalina, Eta still brought considerable damage to the island. Wind speeds of 75 km/h (47 mph) downed the trees and damaged houses, and Eta also caused severe flooding on the island. Damage across the archipelago reached COL$3 billion (US$777,000). Across the archipelago, two people were injured and 141 families were affected. A total of 6 homes were destroyed while another 64 homes and 24 businesses suffered damage.

=== Central America ===
==== Nicaragua ====
As Eta neared landfall, its powerful winds downed power lines and uprooted trees while causing flooding and damaging roofs in Puerto Cabezas. A storm surge of 26 to 33 feet (7.9 to 10.1 m) was reported when Eta made landfall. At the Getsemani School, where 215 people were sheltering, Eta's strong winds ripped 10 sheets of metal off the school's roof. There were no injures or fatalities in the incident. Significant rainfall occurred across much of Nicaragua, with a peak of 26.55 in (674 mm) reported at Puerto Corinto on the country's northwest Pacific coast. Eta was responsible for deaths of two people in the municipality of Bonanza after they were buried in a landslide while working in a mine. Overall, Eta caused C$6.128 billion (US$178.4 million) of damage in Nicaragua.

==== Honduras ====
Hurricane Eta had disastrous effects on Honduras, largely due to catastrophic flooding. Flooding caused 559 residents to flee their homes and two others had to be rescued. An estimated 80 percent of the agricultural sector was reported as lost by the Ministry of Agricultural Livestock. At least 457 homes were damaged by floodwaters, 41 communities were cut off by washed-out roads, and at least nine bridges were destroyed including one in La Ceiba. In La Ceiba, floodwaters rushed through streets, and the flooding also washed away a structure at a local cemetery. A ferry leaving Roatán was rocked by large waves and winds with 300 passengers onboard while trying to reach the port of La Ceiba. Nobody was injured or killed on the ferry. 60 fishermen were lost at sea for days off the coast of Honduras before making it back to shore. The Permanent Contingency Commission of Honduras reported that 14 roads and 339 homes were destroyed. In Olanchito, 12 people, including two newborns, were trapped. A wall collapsed at a prison in El Progreso letting in waist-deep floodwaters, causing the evacuation of more than 600 inmates. At least 74 people have been killed across Honduras as a result of Eta, mainly due to landslides and drownings. Among the dead were at least four people, including three children, who were killed in the mountains outside the north coast city of Tela due to different landslides. In Santa Barbara, a 2-year-old girl was killed when she and her mother were swept away by floodwaters; the mother survived. Four members of the same family died in the municipality of Gualala due to heavy rains. A 13-year-old girl was killed when a mudflow caused her home to collapse in the village of Carmen. In Sulaco, a 15-year-old boy drowned while trying to cross a rain-swollen river. A 37-year-old man also drowned in San Manuel, in the western part of the Lempira Department. Total economic losses in Honduras are estimated in excess of 125 billion lempiras (US$5 billion).

==== Guatemala ====
According to the country's president, Alejandro Giammattei, at least 60% of the eastern city of Puerto Barrios was flooded with another 48 hours of rain expected. About 100 homes were damaged by flooding and landslides. A bridge crossing the Río Grande de Zacapa in Jocotán was washed away. At least 53 people died across Guatemala, while an additional 96 remain missing. An estimated 343,000 people were directly affected by the storm. The village of Queja near San Cristobal Verapaz in the center of the country was particularly hard-hit, with a landslide burying 150 homes. Over 100 people were buried from the landslide, and rescuers began searching them on November 9. However, the searching was called off two days later. Infrastructural damage were amounted to be exceed Q3 billion (US$386 million).

==== El Salvador ====
Heavy rainfall affected much of El Salvador as Eta passed to the northeast. Accumulations generally exceeded 2.8 in (70 mm) with a maximum of 6.3 in (160 mm) in the La Unión Department. A total of 107 communities experienced power outages. Nationwide, 1,991 people required evacuation due to floods and landslides. Despite a ban on fishing activities, one fisherman drowned off the coast of Playa El Espino in the Usulután Department.

==== Costa Rica ====
The outer bands of Hurricane Eta brought heavy rainfall to portions of Costa Rica. The heaviest rains were concentrated along the nation's Pacific coast, especially in Guanacaste Province. Multiple reports of flooding and landslides occurred nationwide, 12 rivers saw increased levels, prompting concern for further flooding, and 26 people required evacuation in Corredores and Parrita. In southern Costa Rica, a landslide onto a house killed two residents, a Costa Rican woman and an American man. Preliminary damage in the nation were almost ₡10 billion (US$16.5 million).

==== Panama ====
The National Civil Protection System in Panama, Sinaproc, reported that 200 homes were damaged by rainfall, possibly associated with Eta. The highway that connects the province of Chiriquí with Bocas del Toro collapsed near Hornito, blocking the passage of vehicles in both directions. Flooding in Panama's Chiriqui province, near the Costa Rica border killed 19 people. Agricultural loss was estimated at US$11 million.

==== Belize ====
Hurricane Eta brought approximately 20 inches of rain to Belize causing severe flooding in Cayo District and Belize District. The worst effects were felt in Cayo District, where the Macal and Mopan rivers rose more than 8.8 metres (29 ft), inundating communities from Arenal (on the border with Guatemala) to Roaring Creek. Residents in low-lying areas had to be evacuated from their homes. Approximately 60,000 people in Belize were affected.

==== Mexico ====
At least 27 people died as heavy rains attributed to Eta caused swelled streams and rivers. Over 80,000 people were affected in the Mexican states of Chiapas and Tabasco by rains of Hurricane Eta and a cold front. In the Chiapas highlands, more than 2,000 homes were destroyed. In San Cristóbal de las Casas, many neighborhoods were damaged by the flooding Amarillo and Fogótico rivers. An increase of 1,500 cubic metres per second (53,000 cu ft/s) in flow at the Peñitas Dam prompted evacuation plans. In Tabasco, more than 10 rivers overflowed their banks.

=== Cayman Islands and Cuba ===
Eta brushed by the Cayman Islands just as it intensified back into a tropical storm, producing major impacts across the islands with Grand Cayman being hit the hardest. Wave action off the coast caused minor flooding on the coasts. Downed trees and tree branches also resulted. Power outages became widespread across the islands with tropical-storm force winds causing damage to power lines.

Eta bought heavy rainfall in areas already dealing with overflowing rivers. Coastal zones in Cuba were also flooded and about 25,000 people were forced to evacuate.

=== United States ===
==== Florida ====
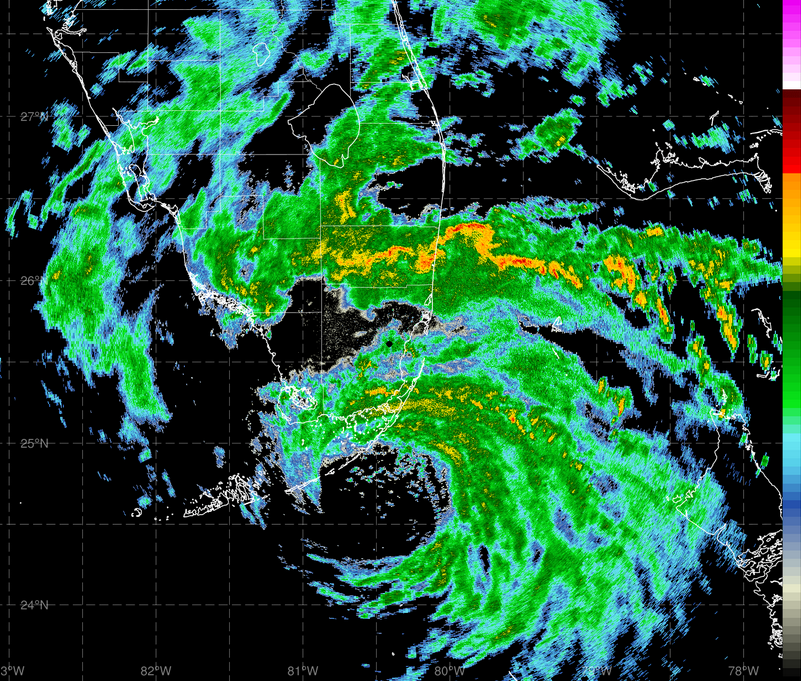
Tropical Storm Eta making landfall in the Florida Keys early on November 9.

The outer bands of Eta brought tropical storm-force gusts to South Florida beginning on November 7. A peak wind gust of 53 mph (85 km/h) was reported in these outer bands near Dania Beach on November 7. Florida Power & Light reported just over 30,000 power outages in the Miami metropolitan area, including nearly 16,000 in Miami-Dade County alone. Overall, about 48,500 businesses and homes lost electricity throughout South Florida. Heavy rainfall also impacted the region, with a peak total of 20.74 in (527 mm) in Pembroke Pines, while rain gauges elsewhere in Pembroke Pines and nearby Miramar observed more than 14 in (360 mm) of precipitation. Street flooding occurred in Broward, northern Miami-Dade, and Monroe counties. One person was taken to the hospital in South Florida after being rescued from flooded roads. In Brickell, recently installed storm water pumps to deal with tidal flooding and storms helped clear the flood water from the rain and high tide event. One of the state's largest COVID-19 testing sites, at Hard Rock Stadium in Miami Gardens, was flooded.

On November 11, a sailboat became lodged partially underneath the Matlacha Pass Bridge, causing the bridge to be temporarily closed thus cutting off transportation to and from Pine Island. Around the same area two other boats sank due to turbulent surf caused by the storm and a dock at the Bridgewater Inn floated away. The Sanibel Causeway was also shut down due to storm surge and heavy rain. A man died in Bradenton Beach when he was electrocuted by an appliance in standing water caused by the storm and a firefighter was injured as he tried to access the home. Flooding in Pinellas County caused 33 people to be rescued by the Pinellas County Sheriff Office from homes and roadways and in Gulfport, five sailboats became unanchored and ran aground or were pushed up against a seawall. In Sarasota, the wettest November day on record was recorded. An EF0 tornado also ripped the porch off a house in Verna on November 11. Losses statewide were estimated at US$1 billion.

Officially, Eta made two landfalls in Florida - it hit the central part of the Florida Keys late Sunday, November 7, and made landfall again at about 4 a.m. Thursday, November 12, near Cedar Key, roughly 130 mi (210 km) north of Tampa.

==== Elsewhere ====
Moisture from Eta combined with a cold front moving eastward across the Eastern United States, generating extremely heavy rainfall across Virginia and the Carolinas. At least eleven people were killed due to flooding in the Carolinas, including a child, while over 33 people were rescued in a flooded campground. In Charlotte, North Carolina, more than 140 people were rescued from a school when floodwaters reached the first-floor windows. In Raleigh, North Carolina, multiple car accidents occurred due to slick roads. All lanes of Interstate 95 near the city were closed due to flooding. Over 10 in (250 mm) of rain fell in some areas of North and South Carolina. The storm resulted in at least $20.4 million in North Carolina. In Maryland, the St. Mary's River reached one of its ten highest water levels due to the storm.

== Aftermath ==
Much of Central America was already facing a humanitarian crisis, as an estimated 5.3 million people were in need of assistance as a result of the COVID-19 pandemic. Due to Hurricane Eta's destruction, the economic situation worsened and more people were left in need of aid. With damage from Hurricane Eta spanning the entirety of Central America, the International Federation of Red Cross and Red Crescent Societies (IFRC) launched a "massive, multi-country operation". An estimated 2.5 million people were directly affected by the storm, including 1.7 million in Honduras. The agency began relief operations on November 4 in Nicaragua, and soon expanded to neighboring nations. The IFRC dispatched a plane and two trucks carrying 98 tons of relief goods from Panama to Honduras and Nicaragua by November 10. Several Emergency Response Units stationed globally were to be dispatched to affected areas. An emergency appeal for 20 million Swiss francs (US$22 million) was made to supplement local Red Cross activities in Guatemala, Honduras, and Nicaragua. Numerous agencies coordinated with the IFRC to establish shelters and provide relief. The American, Swiss, Norwegian, Spanish, Italian, and German Red Cross were positioned to assist any operations. Airbnb readied its Open Homes partnership in Honduras and Nicaragua, providing residents with free housing.

The relief effort was severely hampered just two weeks later by the stronger Hurricane Iota, which made landfall approximately 15 miles (24 km) south of where Eta moved ashore. Extreme rainfall and mudflows caused by the storm destroyed or damaged much of what was being rebuilt. A member of Restoring Family Links was dispatched to Honduras for administrative assistance.

Soon after Eta made landfall, NASA's Earth Applied Sciences Disasters program began working with various regional authorities in Central America to use satellite images and data to help teams on the ground analyze the storm's impact as they rescued people in its path. Information was also shared when Iota developed and moved toward the region. In the aftermath of these successive hurricanes, NASA continues to provide information to help national and local authorities in the region identify, assess and reduce the risks related to future hurricanes.

=== Nicaragua ===
Initial relief efforts in Nicaragua were stymied by extensive flooding and persistent rainfall. The Nicaraguan Red Cross coordinated distribution of supplies with the nation's government. By November 8, 14,362 people remained in shelters and required hygiene supplies. The Nicaraguan Government provided 88 tons of food to the North Caribbean Coast Autonomous Region, the hardest hit area. The governments of Japan and Spain pledged to donate relief items.

=== Honduras ===
With extensive damage across the country, Honduras's Secretary of Infrastructure and Public Services and Institute for Community Development and Water and Sanitation divided relief operations into three zones. The Government of Honduras allocated US$2 million in funds and formally appealed for international aid on November 5. By November 7, more than 16,000 people had been rescued while 65,912 people remained isolated across 64 communities. The IFRC expressed concern over an increase in post-traumatic stress disorder, similar to what took place after Hurricane Mitch in 1998. Access to clean water was significantly disrupted due to high turbidity and power outages, though 60% of service was restored by November 7. Together, Hurricanes Eta and Iota killed around 100 Hondurans, and local analysts estimated the damage would cost the country more than $10 billion (L244.1 billion) in damages.

Though distribution systems in some regions of Honduras collapsed after Hurricane Eta, some of the water, sanitation, and hygiene services (WASH) have been restored as of June 2021. The economy has slowly began to recover in the months after destruction.

=== Guatemala ===
With assistance from CONRED (Coordinadora Nacional para la Reducción de Desastres), the Government of Guatemala focused relief efforts in the departments of Izabal, Petén, and Alta Verapaz. By November 7, Taiwan and the United States collectively provided US$320,000 in funding to Guatemala to purchase food and water. Israeli humanitarian aid agency IsraAID's locally based team arrived in Alta Verapaz, on November 9 and provided psychological first aid, medical support, relief items, hygiene kits, and water filters.

== Retirement ==
Due to the damage and loss of life brought about by the storm, especially in Central America, the Greek letter Eta, from the auxiliary storm name list, was retired by the World Meteorological Organization (WMO) in March 2021, and will never be used again for an Atlantic tropical cyclone. The WMO also decided to discontinue the use of the Greek alphabet auxiliary list, and replaced it with a new 21-name supplemental list for use when a regular naming list is exhausted.

== See also ==
- Weather of 2020
- Tropical cyclones in 2020
- List of Category 4 Atlantic hurricanes
- Hurricanes in Central America
- List of Cuba hurricanes
- List of Florida hurricanes (2000–present)
