= San Sebastián, Lempira =

San Sebastián Colosuca
- Municipality
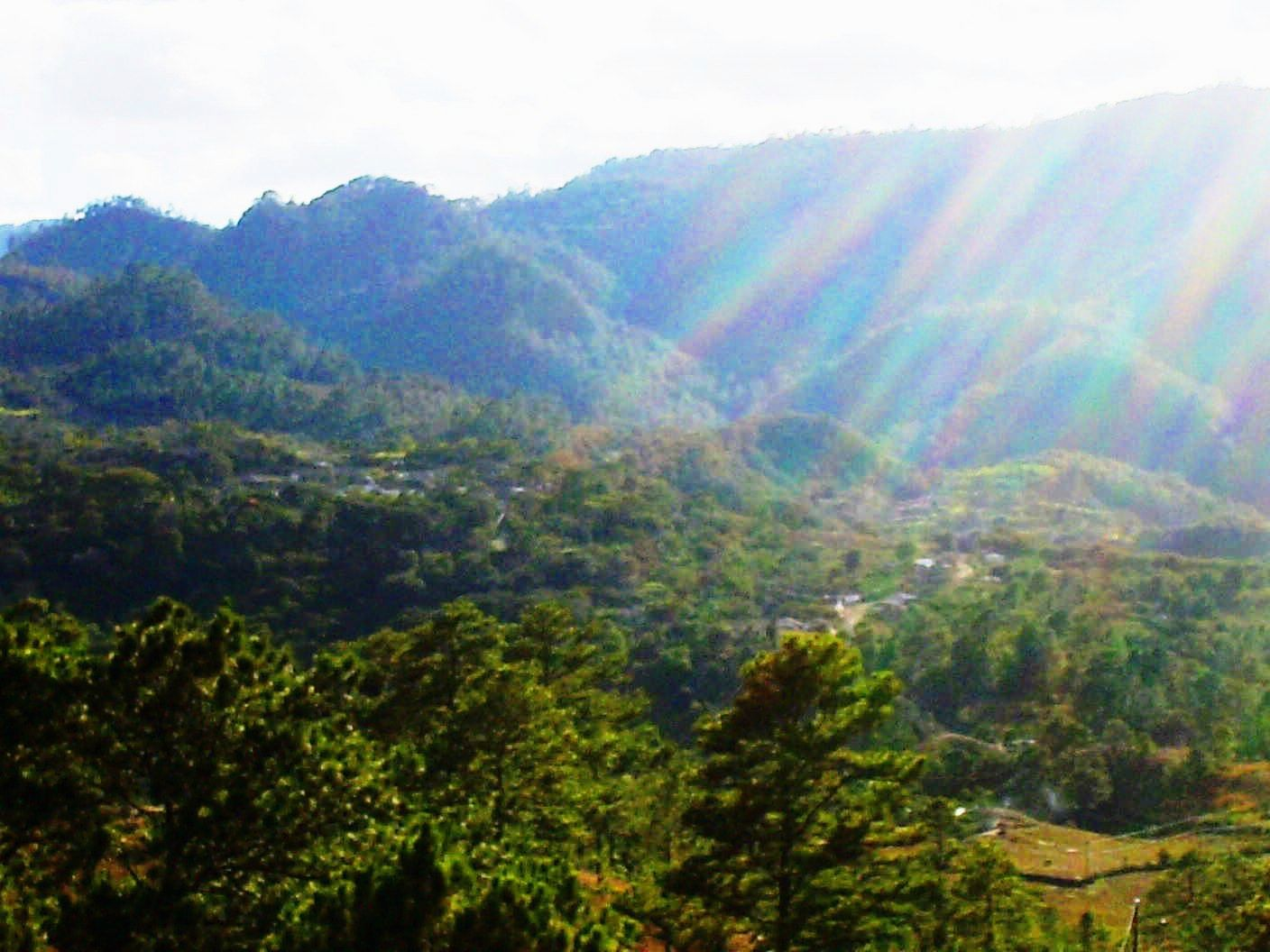
- Panoramic View San Sebastián

- Location in Honduras
- Coordinates: 14°15′N 88°30′W
- Country: Honduras
- Department: Lempira
- Municipality since: 7 March 1896; 130 years ago

Area
  - Total: 227 km^{2} (88 sq mi)

Population (2014)
  - Total: 10,857
  - Density: 47.8/km^{2} (124/sq mi)

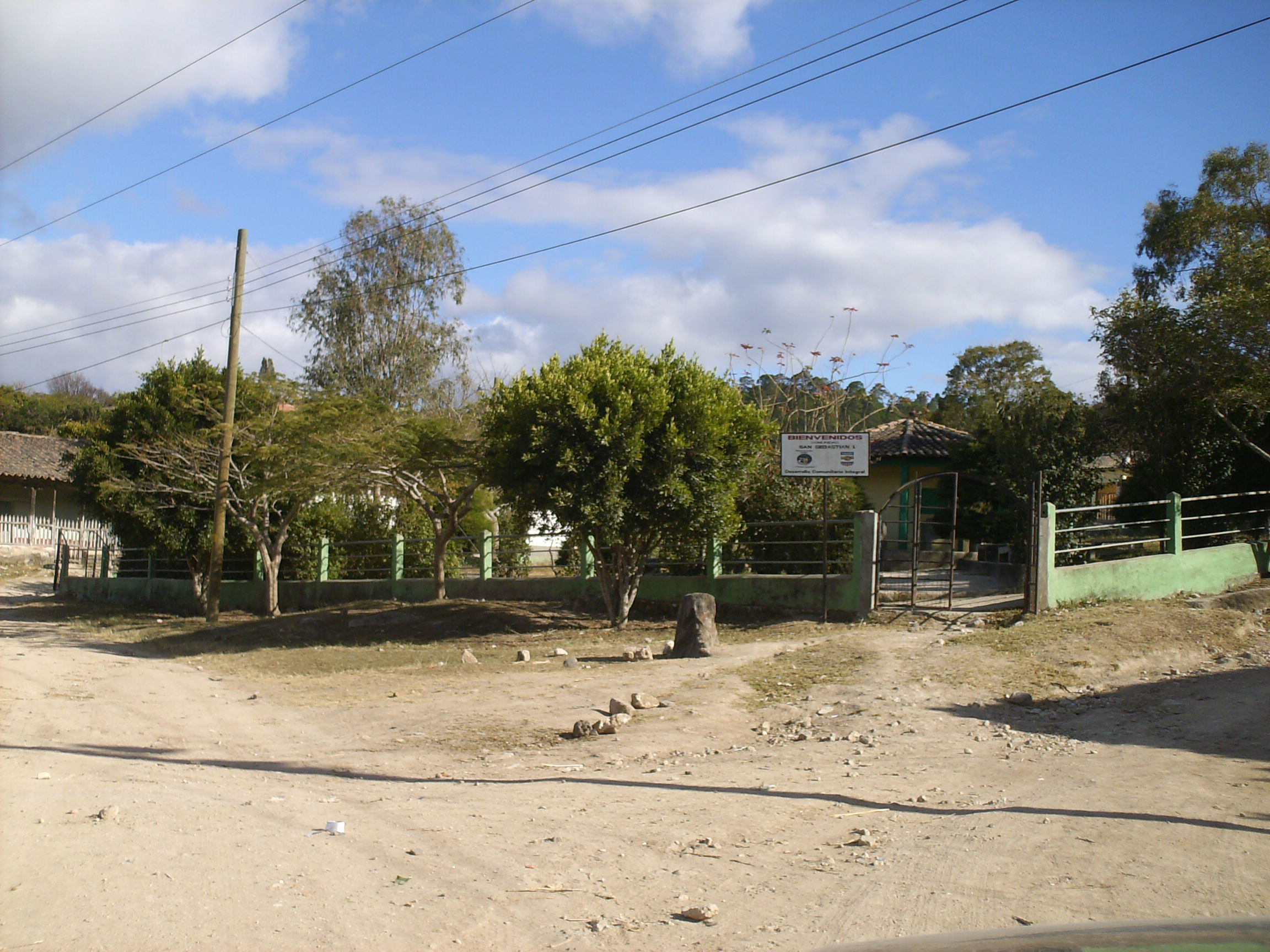
Central Park in San Sebastián

San Sebastián is a municipality in the Honduran department of Lempira.

It is one of the most isolated municipalities in Lempira and is located 13 km away from San Manuel Colohete.

== History ==
In the 1887 census, San Sebastián appeared as Colosuca village, of Gracias. It became a municipality on 7 March 1896. The name "Colosuca" means "Beautiful Place".

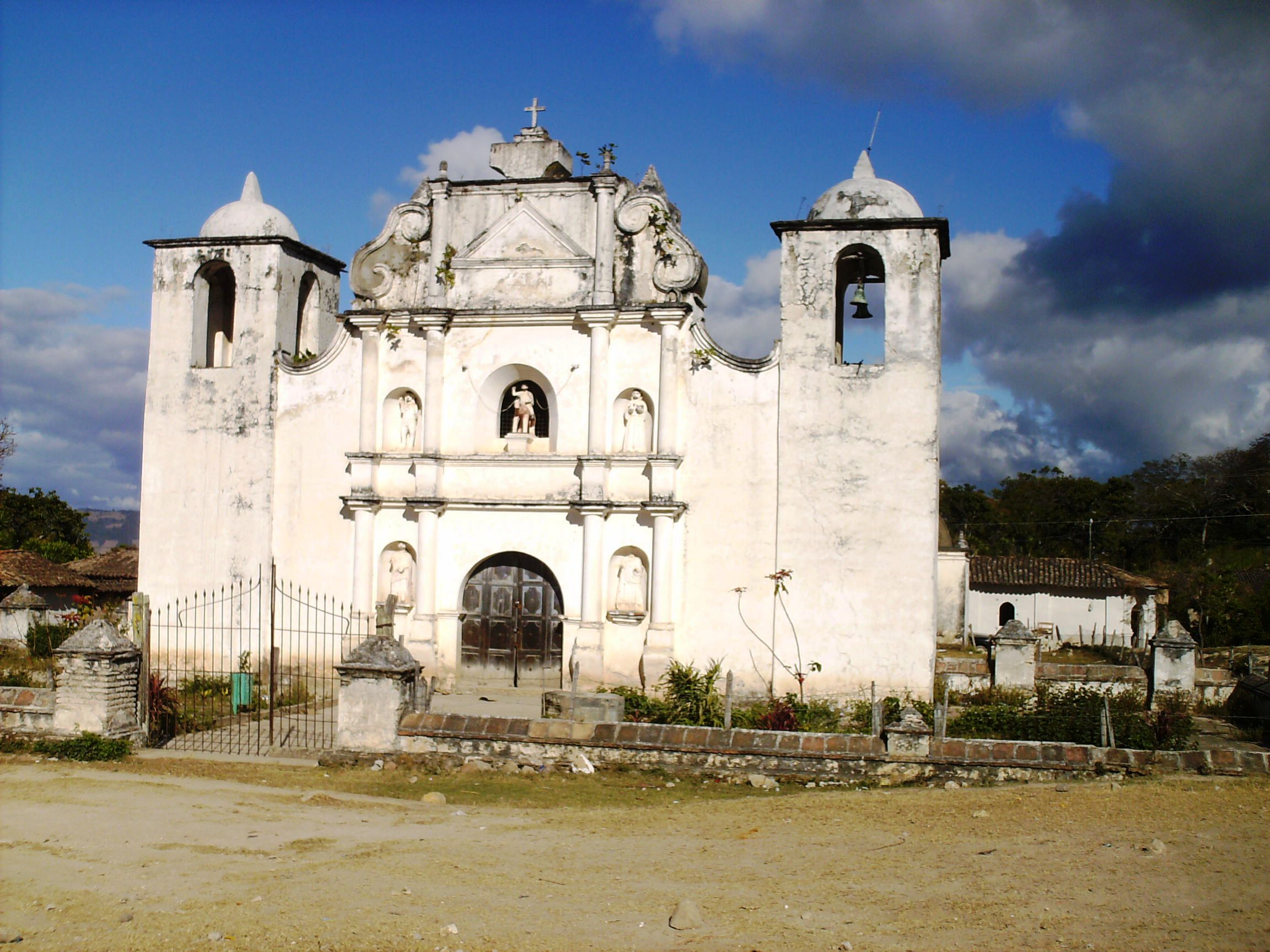
Old Church of San Sebastián

== Geography ==
The municipality capital is up on a big mountain, surrounded by many pine trees and some oak trees. The mountains are very high and steep. In some of these mountains the vegetation changes to bushes and undergrowth. The origin of the rocks and soil all around is volcanic.

== Boundaries ==
Its boundaries are:

- North: San Manuel Colohete municipality and Ocotepeque department.
- South: Tomalá and San Andrés municipalities.
- East: La Campa and San Manuel Colohete municipalities.
- West: Guarita, Cololaca and San Marcos de Caiquin municipalities.
- Area: 227 km^{2}

== Resources ==
The coffee harvest provides jobs for the locals and people from other places, as it's the main economic activity of the region. The second most important activity is raising cattle. The commerce of groceries with Gracias is a very profitable activity. The corn and bean crops are primarily for local consumption. In 2007, a sewage system was installed, using water from perforated wells. San Sebastián is connected to the electricity network and has mobile communications coverage. As for the transportation services, only one bus is available, and it stays in the municipality's capital and travels back from Gracias in the afternoon.

== Population ==
- Population: For the year 2001 this municipality had 8,026 people, and in 2013 the municipality had 10,453 people.
- Villages: 7
- Settlements: 108

=== Demographics ===
At the time of the 2013 Honduras census, San Sebastián municipality had a population of 10,453. Of these, 89.83% were Indigenous (89.76% Lenca), 10.00% Mestizo and 0.17% Black or Afro-Honduran.

== Tourism ==
Once Colohete is passed the road becomes narrower and steeper and therefore more dangerous. 4-wheel drive vehicles are needed when visiting this municipality. There are two rivers that must be crossed. One can only be crossed during the dry season. The other can be crossed via a bridge. The Congolon Mountain can be seen to the south and some other mountains in Ocotepeque to the north. The old church also gives a good reason to visit, if the traveler enjoys ancient colonial buildings. This municipality is in the Colosuca path, this is organized by the national institute of tourism and some Mayor's offices of several municipalities. The object of this is to show the Indian legacy.

- Local Holidays: "San Sebastián" day on 20 January.
