= Santa Cruz, Honduras =

Santa Cruz Guaticaitique
- Municipality
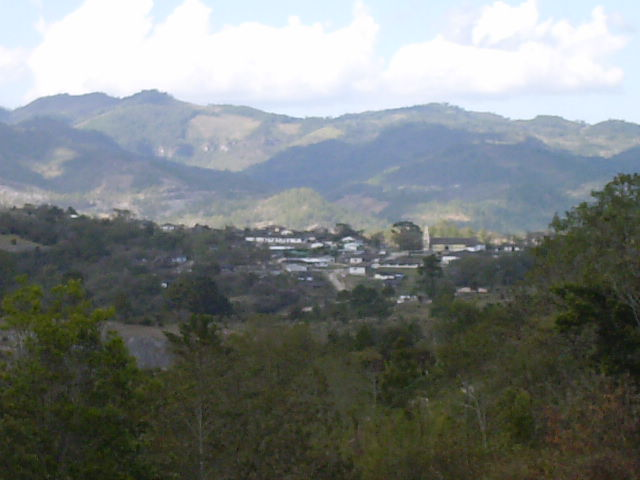
- Panoramic View of Santa Cruz

- Location in Honduras
- Coordinates: 14°1′N 88°23′W
- Country: Honduras
- Department: Lempira
- Municipality since: 26 October 1926; 100 years ago

Area
  - Total: 150 km^{2} (58 sq mi)

Population (2015)
  - Total: 7,089
  - Density: 47/km^{2} (120/sq mi)
- Website: Official website

Santa Cruz (Spanish pronunciation: [ˈsanta ˈkɾus]) is a municipality in the Honduran department of Lempira.

It is one of the most hidden municipalities of the Lempira department. It is 70 km away from the city of Gracias, forced to pass by San Juan del Caite in Intibuca.

== History ==
Its former name was "Guaticaitique", after that it was "Santa Cruz de Guasabosque". In the census of 1887 it was a village of Erandique. On 26 October 1926 it was granted the title of municipality in the administration of president Miguel Paz Barahona.

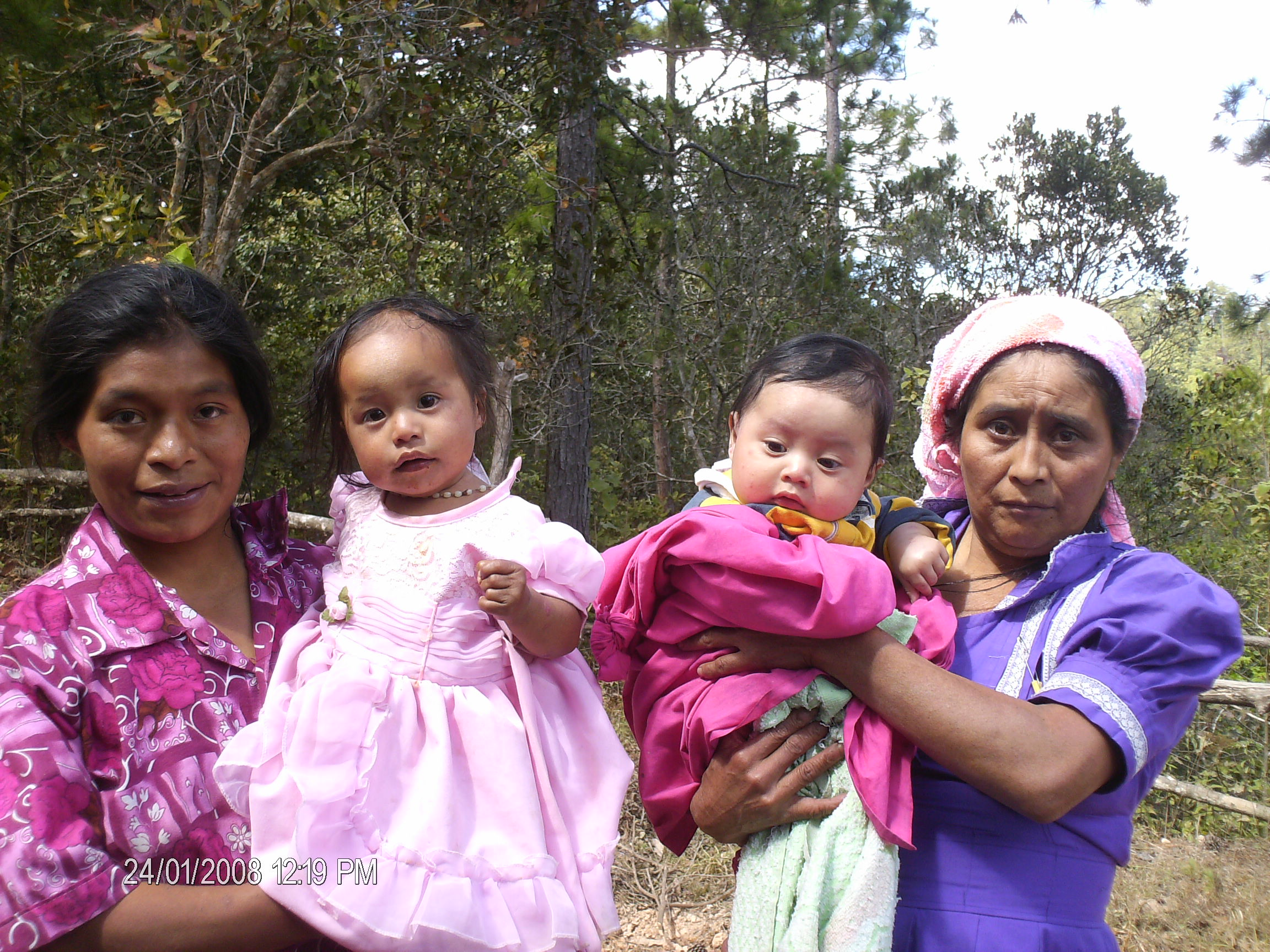
Lenca Women with their offspring

== Geography ==
As in the rest of the department, one cannot miss the high, steep mountains on their way to the municipality capital. Also on the road there are a couple of quarries, they provide material for the maintenance of the road. Rocks of different colours and hardnesses may be seen. It has a great amount of forest resources, but all around the municipality capital, less trees are seen. Pine forests are the most prevalent, but there is also a good amount of Liquidambar forest.

== Boundaries ==
Its boundaries are:

- North : La Campa municipality.
- South : Erandique and San Andrés municipalities.
- East : Intibuca department.
- West : San Andrés municipality.
- Surface Extents: 150 km^{2}

== Resources ==
This is one of the poorest municipalities of the department. The coffee plantations are the main industry. Cattle raising, corn and beans crops follow but are mostly for local use. It has electricity and mobile communication services and water is sourced from wells. According to the elder inhabitants, close to the municipality capital there is a big deposit of several metals, but the owner of this property has no intention to exploit it and has rejected some millionaire offers from multi-nationals companies.

== Population ==
- Population:For the year 2001 this municipality had 4,929 people, this figure was the base for an estimate, resulting in 7,089 people for the year of 2015.
- Villages: 6
- Settlements: 61

=== Demographics ===
At the time of the 2013 Honduras census, Santa Cruz municipality had a population of 6,770. Of these, 69.15% were Indigenous, 30.43% Mestizo, 0.38% Black or Afro-Honduran and 0.03% White.

== Tourism ==
The turnoff to the municipal capital is difficult to find. It is approximately 20 km from San Juan del Caite, just across a football field. The road from the turnoff to the municipal capital is in poor condition. There is not much to see in the town itself. Visitors interested in colonial architecture may wish to visit its church. The municipality's main attraction is its Liquidambar forest, whose leaves change colour depending on the season. Visitors may also be interested in learning about the Indigenous descendants who continue to preserve many aspects of their ancestral heritage.

- Local Holidays: "Santa Cruz" day on 3 May and "San Francisco" day on 4 October.

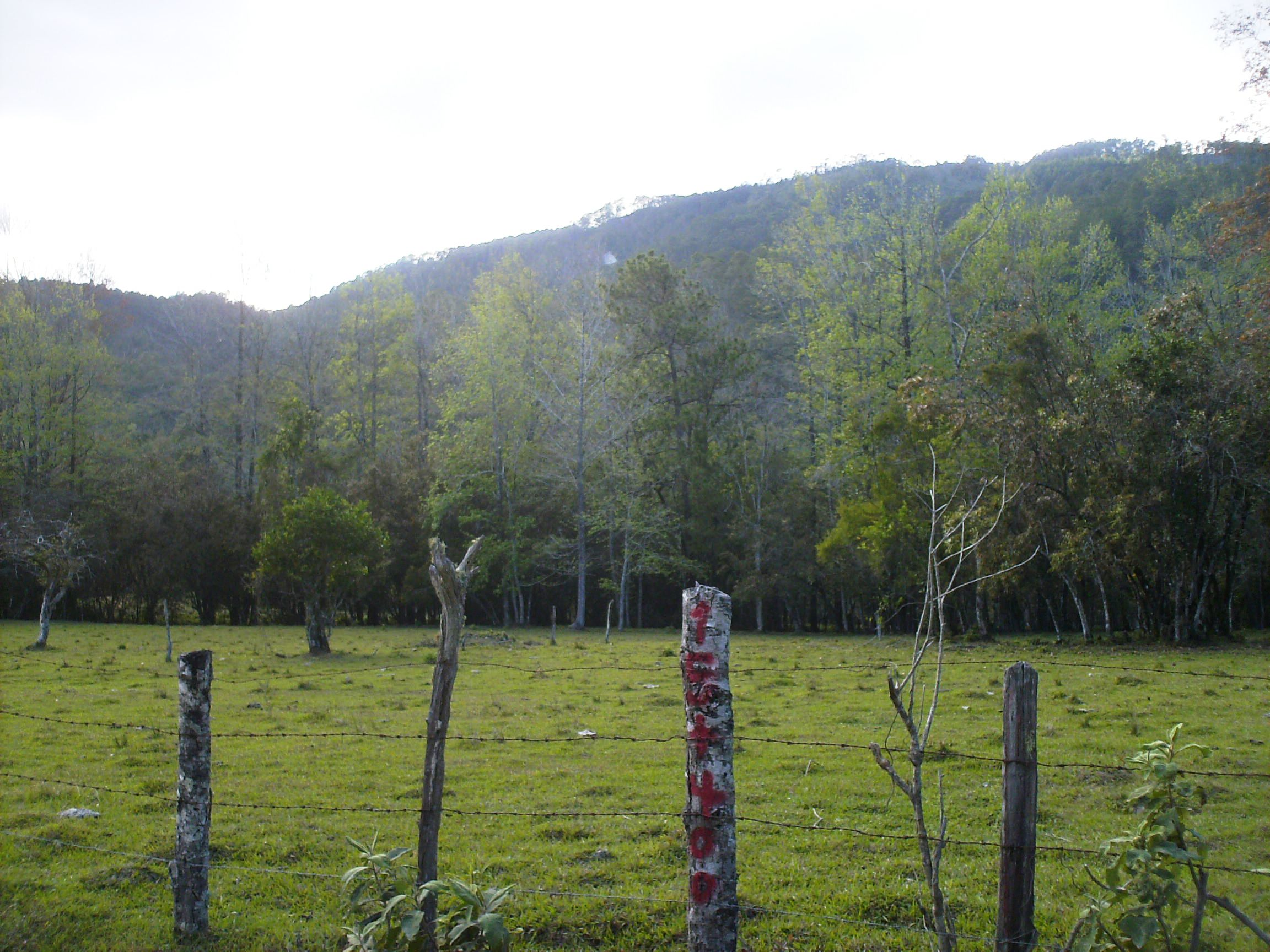
Spring Season in Santa Cruz forests
