= San Andrés, Honduras =

San Andrés
- Municipality
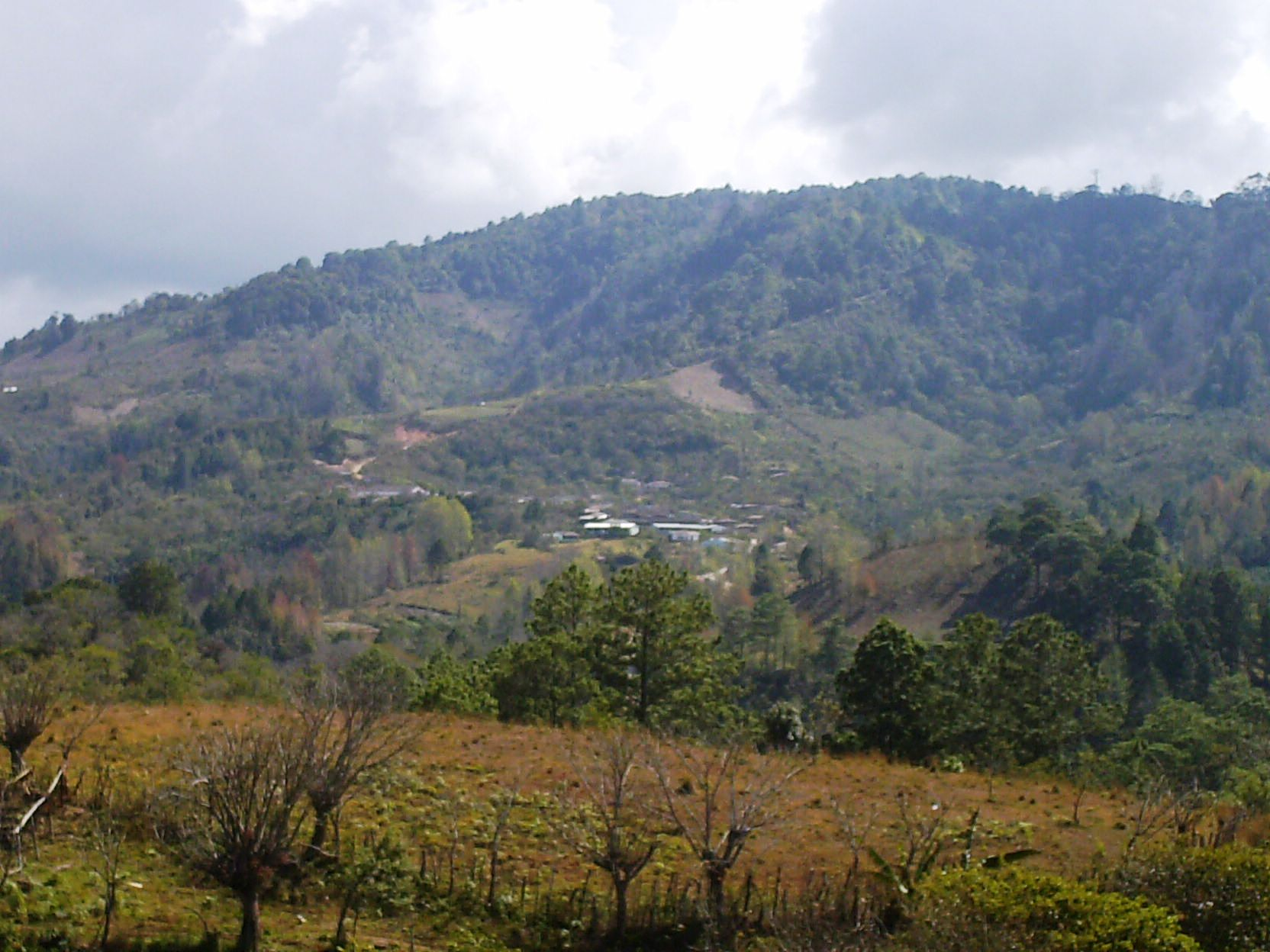
- Panoramic View of San Andrés town

- Location in Honduras
- Coordinates: 14°13′14.11″N 88°33′2.63″W.
- Country: Honduras
- Department: Lempira

Area
  - Total: 243 km^{2} (94 sq mi)

Population (2015)
  - Total: 13,585
  - Density: 55.9/km^{2} (145/sq mi)

San Andrés is a municipality in the Honduran department of Lempira.

It is notable as the principal site in Honduras for the mining of andesite opals from Las Colinas deposit near Social, which is in the municipality. This mining is largely performed by artisanal miners, rather than on an industrial scale.

It is approximately 120 km from Gracias city. It is about 1 hour away from Erandique city.

== History ==
In the census of 1801 it was no Social "Guaxinlaca" village, under the delegation of "Gracias a Dios". In the national division of 1889, it appeared as a municipality of Erandique district.

== Geography ==
Since it is located on the mountains, the main forests are pines and oaks trees. In 2020, it had 12.4 kha of natural forest. Its elevation above sea level is the proper one for coffee plantations. Its mountains and hills are very high and steep. It has several water spring running down the steep hills. One curiosity is a huge rock monolith on the way to the departmental capital, which proves the volcanic origins of the rocks in this municipality and the rest of the department.

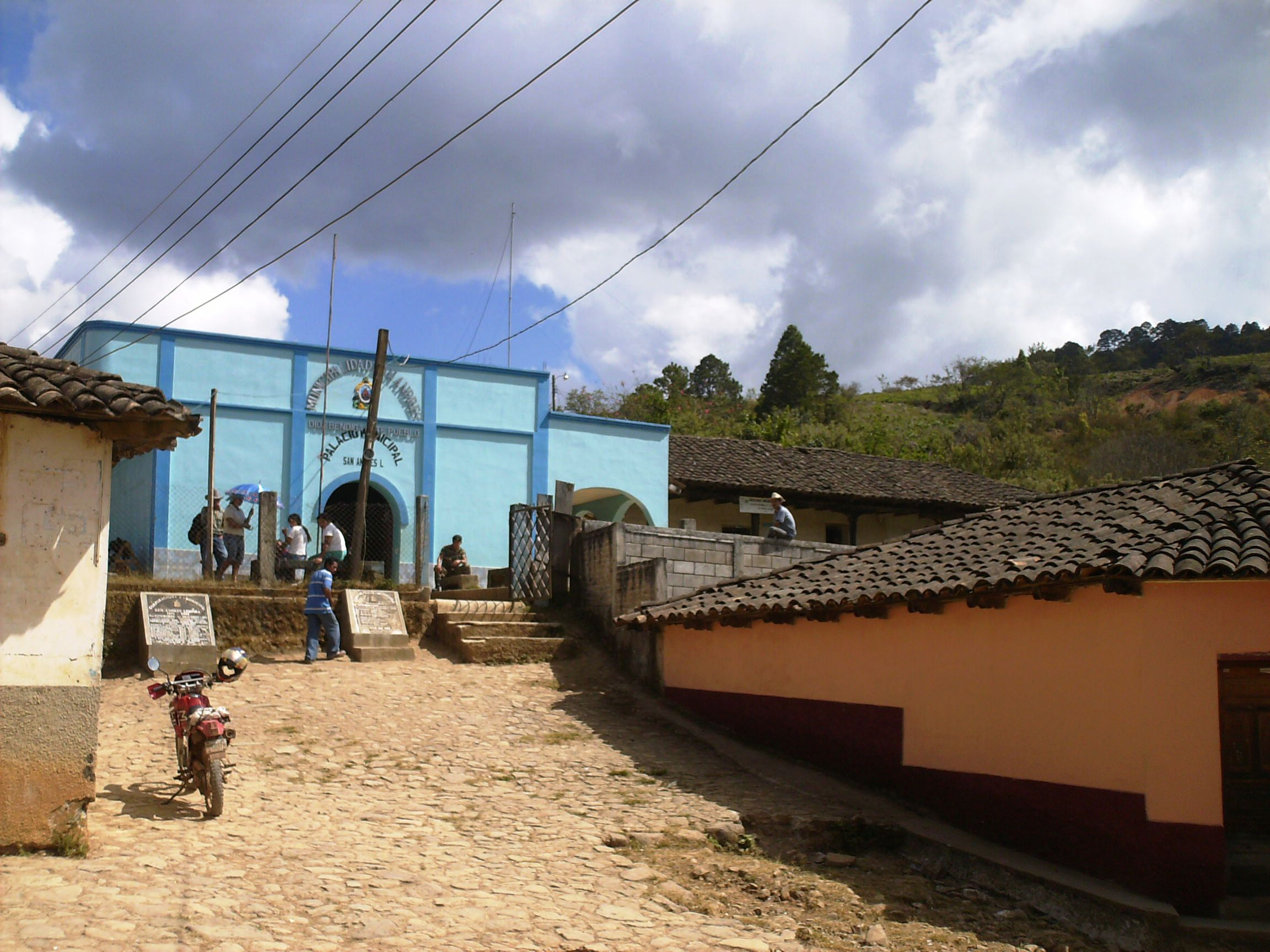
The Mayor's Office Sa n Andrés

== Boundaries ==
Its boundaries are:

- North: La Campa, San Sebastián and Santa Cruz municipalities.
- South: Gualcince municipality.
- East: Erandique municipality.
- West: Valladolid, Tambla and Tomalá municipalities.
- Surface Extents: 243 square km

== Resources ==
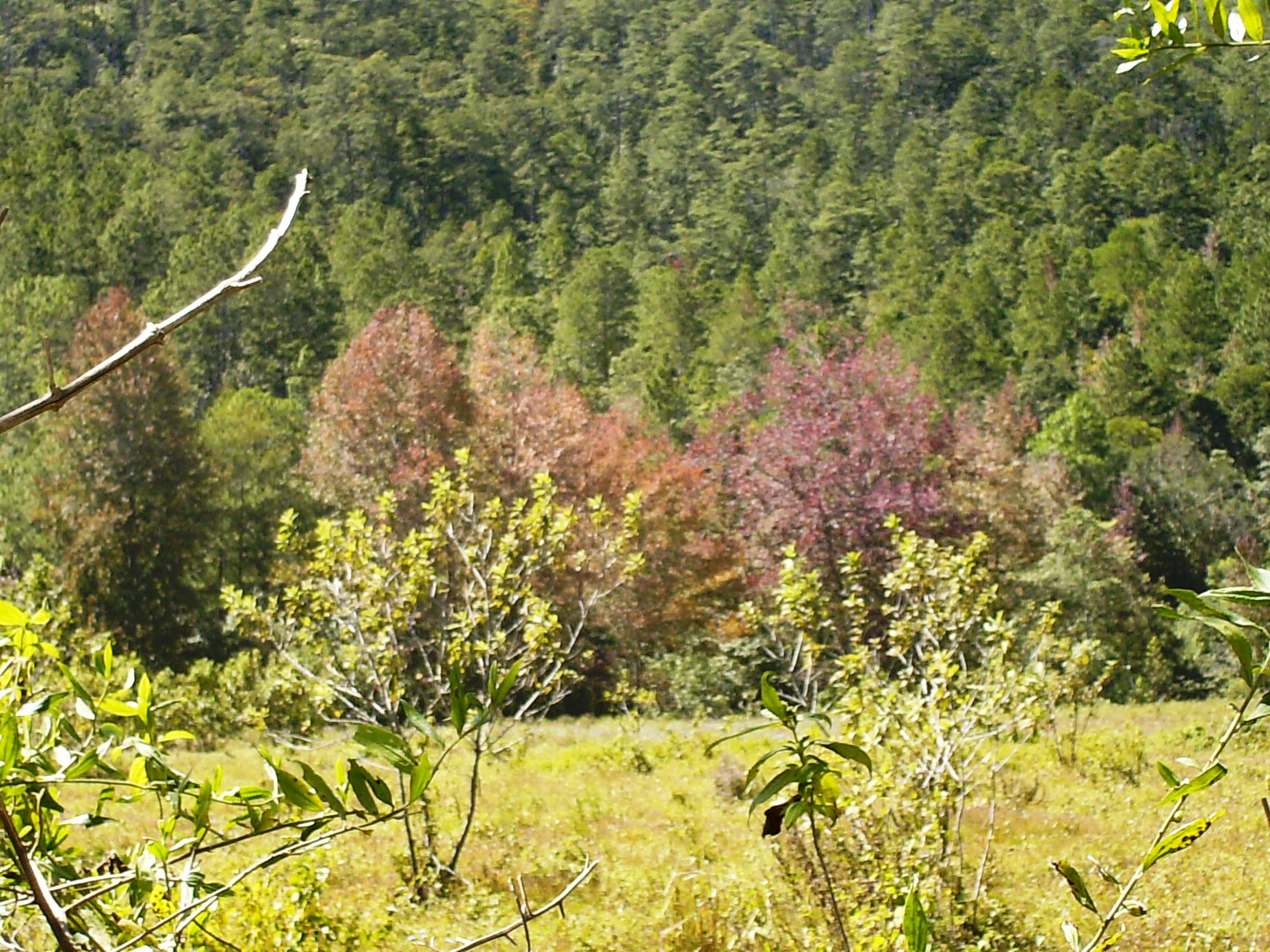
Autumn in San Andrés' forests

The main product of this municipality is coffee, taking advantage of its elevation from sea level and soil conditions. Vegetables, corn, and beans are second in importance, and then follows cattle raising and milk products. These last items are mostly for local consumption. The exploitation of the forest is rational yet. There is electricity, but they sometimes have problems with it, and the absence can last up to 3 days. There is also coverage of mobiles services. And in some houses, people sell gasoline and diesel fuel.

== Population ==
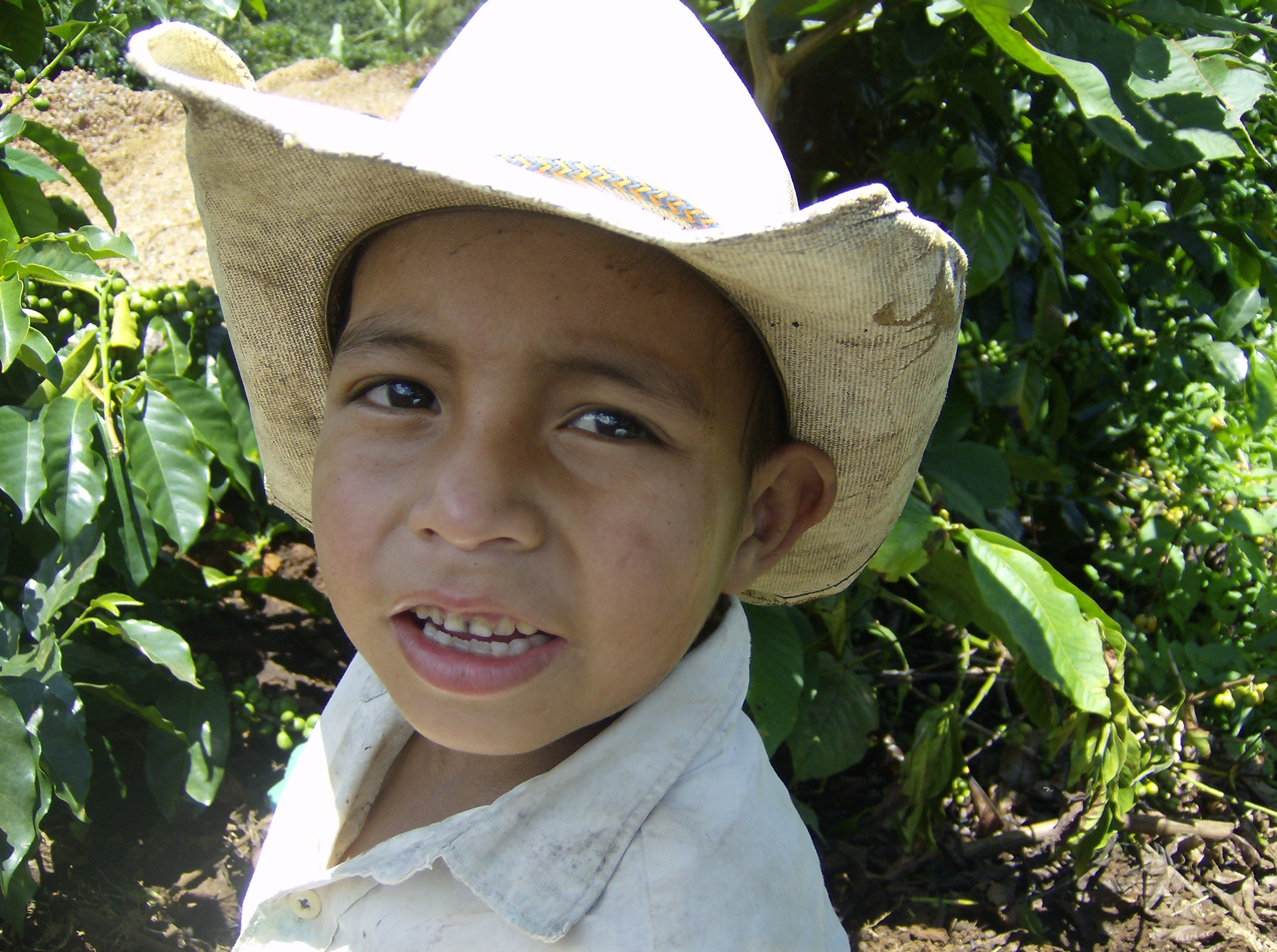
A little Worker from San Andrés

In the particular case of this municipality, the descendants of Indians take the highest percent, mostly in the surrounding villages. The cross-breed of Spanish and Indians takes the rest.

- Population: The figure in 2001 was 10,472, and according to estimates by the INE Honduras, 13,585 is expected for 2015.
- Villages: 8
- Settlements: 144

=== Demographics ===
At the time of the 2013 Honduras census, San Andrés municipality had a population of 13,151. Of these, 52.51% were Indigenous (52.45% Lenca), 47.17% Mestizo, 0.27% Black or Afro-Honduran and 0.04% White.
