= La Campa =

- Municipality
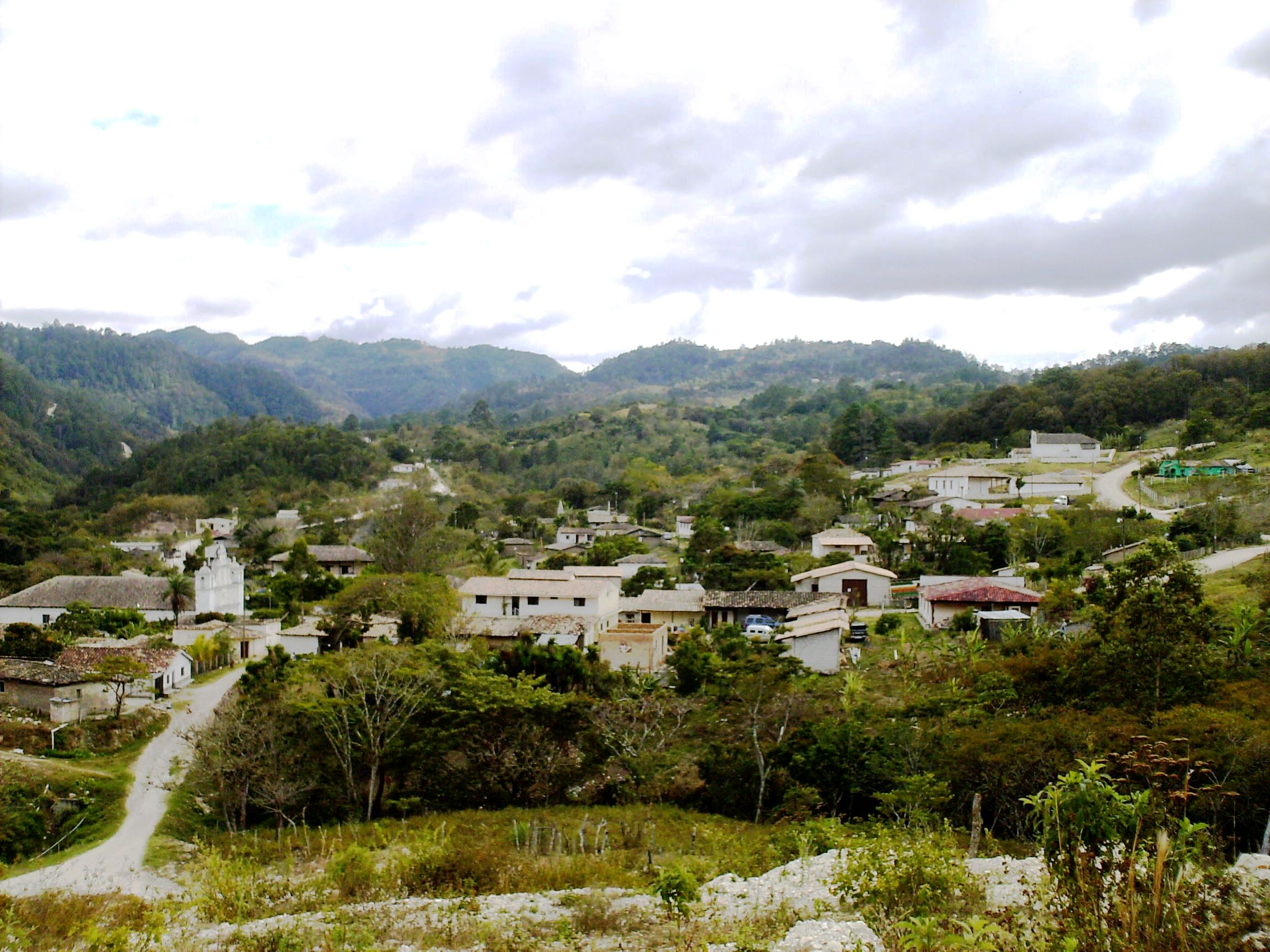
- Panoramical La Campa

- Location in Honduras
- Coordinates: 14°28′N 88°36′W
- Country: Honduras
- Department: Lempira
- Municipality since: 1921

Area
  - Total: 109 km^{2} (42 sq mi)

Population (2015)
  - Total: 6,539
  - Density: 60.0/km^{2} (155/sq mi)

La Campa is a municipality and an aldea, or small town, in the Honduran Department of Lempira, located about 18 kilometres (11 mi) by dirt road from Gracias, the largest town in the immediate region.

The residents of Gracias, La Campa, and other nearby aldeas, including San Manuel Colohete, are primarily of Lenca ancestry. Despite its small size, the aldea has several smaller, scattered satellite communities in the hills above La Campa, such as Cruz Alta. These communities cultivate coffee for consumption and sale, as well as subsistence crops including rice, mango, various types of bananas, and black beans. They also operate their own public elementary schools and churches.

The town is known as a centre of Lenca pottery production, of which there are two main styles; there are black and white (smoked) pots and red-glazed pots. La Campa's are of the latter style. Much of the pottery sold in La Campa is brought down from the hillside villages, where the villagers are adept pottery makers. The town also has a large 18th-century Spanish church. La Campa sits in a deep river valley near Montaña Celaque (a.k.a. Cerro Las Minas), the tallest mountain in Honduras.

== History ==
La Campa in 1582 was a small town with 20 tributaries to encomendero Mario Cana. It was previously known as "Tecauxinas", back in 1887 it was a village of Gracias. It became a municipality in 1921. The name of "La Campa" has its origins in an expression used by old miners, it had to do with searching protection against the rain.

== Geography ==
It is located on a hillside and it is guarded by a line of solid rock hills covered with pine forests. The weather is cool and temperate most of the year.

== Boundaries ==
Its boundaries are:

- North : Gracias and Belén municipalities.
- South : San Andrés and Santa Cruz.
- East : Belén municipality and Intibuca department.
- West : San Manuel Colohete and San Sebastián municipalities.

The municipal boundaries cover some 172 square kilometres (42,502 acres) in land area.

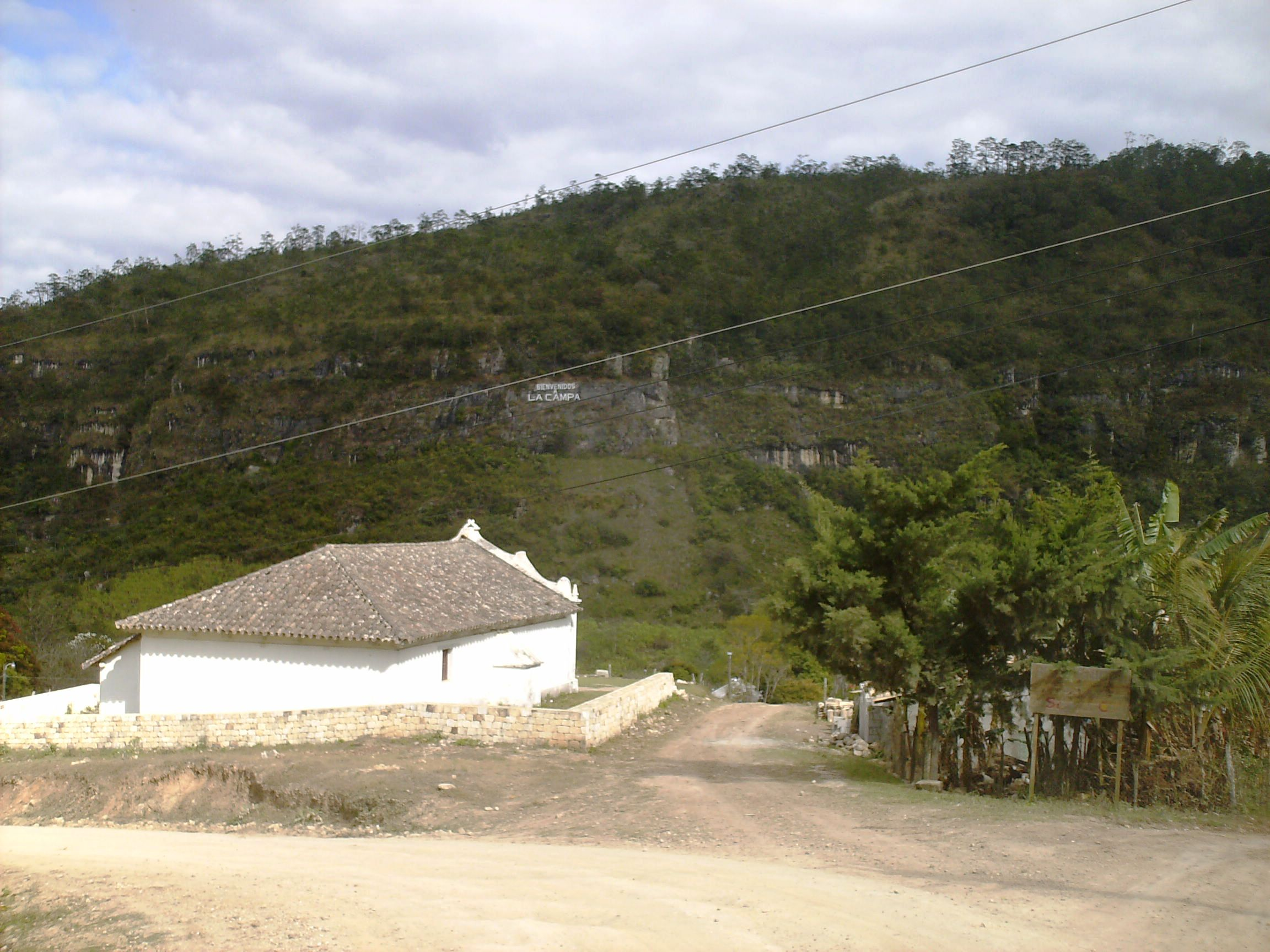
Arriving at La Campa

== Resources ==
La Campa is lacks ideal elevation for coffee plantations and therefore makes use of its flat surfaces for sowing vegetables. It comprises numerous fresh water springs, most emanating from within Celaque National Park.

== Population ==
The people in La Campa are of mixed race with the majority being descendants of the indigenous peoples of the Americas living in this area and surrounding villages prior to the pre-columbian invasion.

In 2001 the population of La Campa municipality was 4,238. The National Intitue of Statistics projected a population increase to reach in excess of 5 thousand inhabitants by 2008.

The La Campa municipality contains 5 designated villages, and 49 other named settlements.

=== Demographics ===
At the time of the 2013 Honduras census, La Campa municipality had a population of 6,515. Of these, 80.45% were Indigenous (80.25% Lenca), 18.25% Mestizo, 0.95% Black or Afro-Honduran and 0.35% White.

== Tourism ==
There are many visits to this place organised by some hotels in Gracias. It is part of "Colosuca" trail and its well preserved church is one of the attractions.

"San Matias" day is a local holiday and festival period, running from 15 to 28 February.

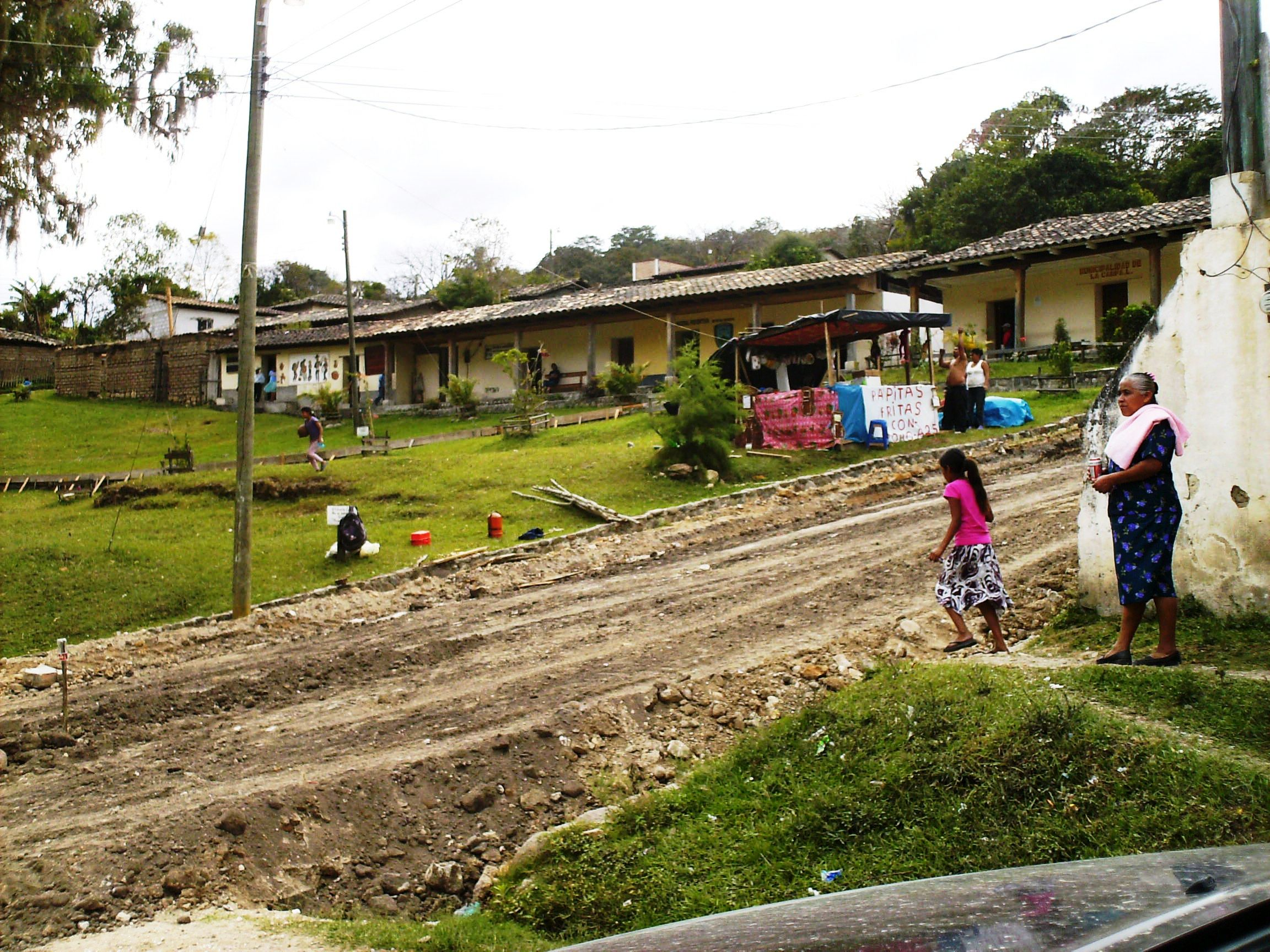
Welcome to La Campa

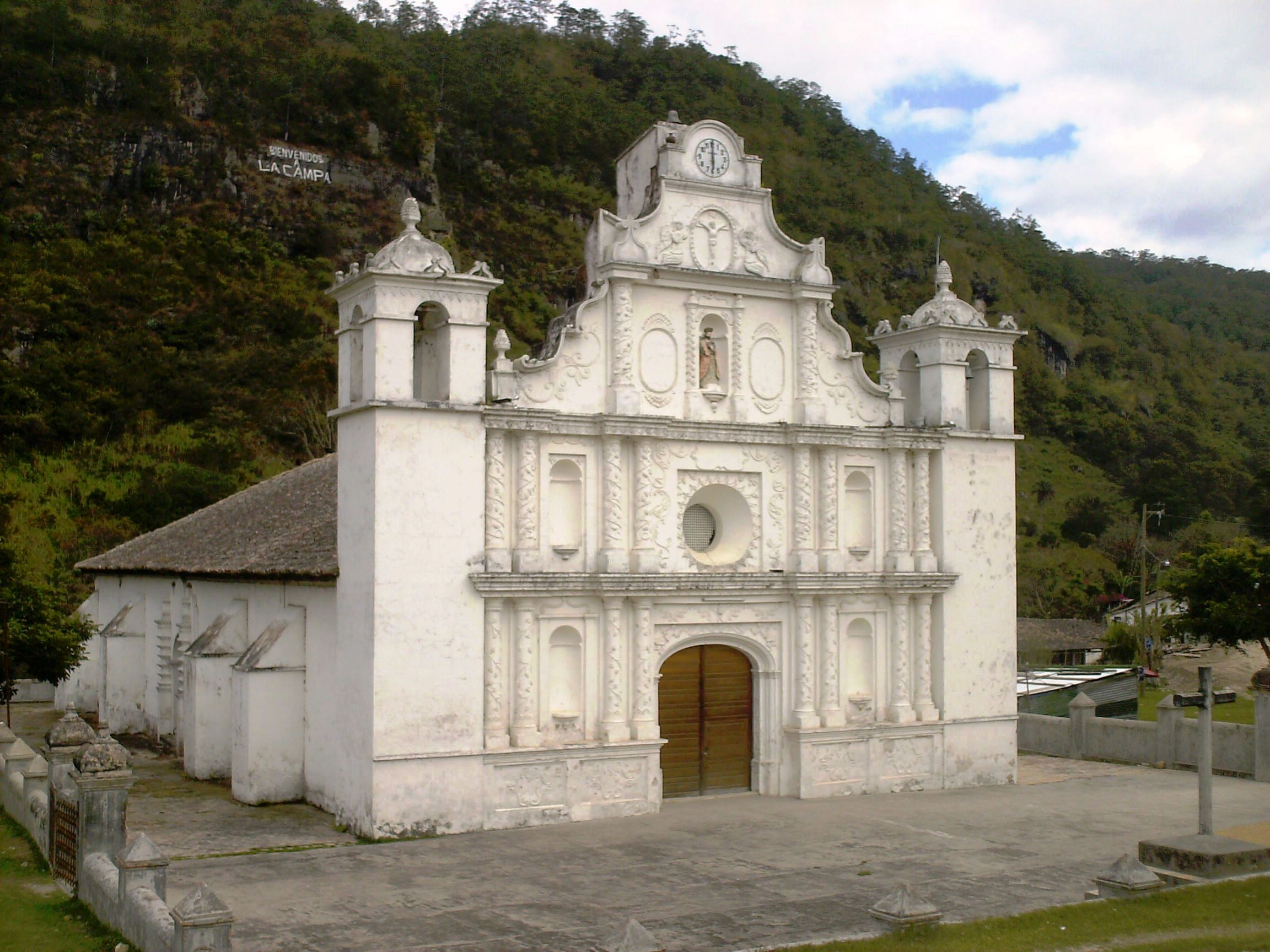
The Famous Old Colonial Church
