= San Manuel Colohete =

- Municipality
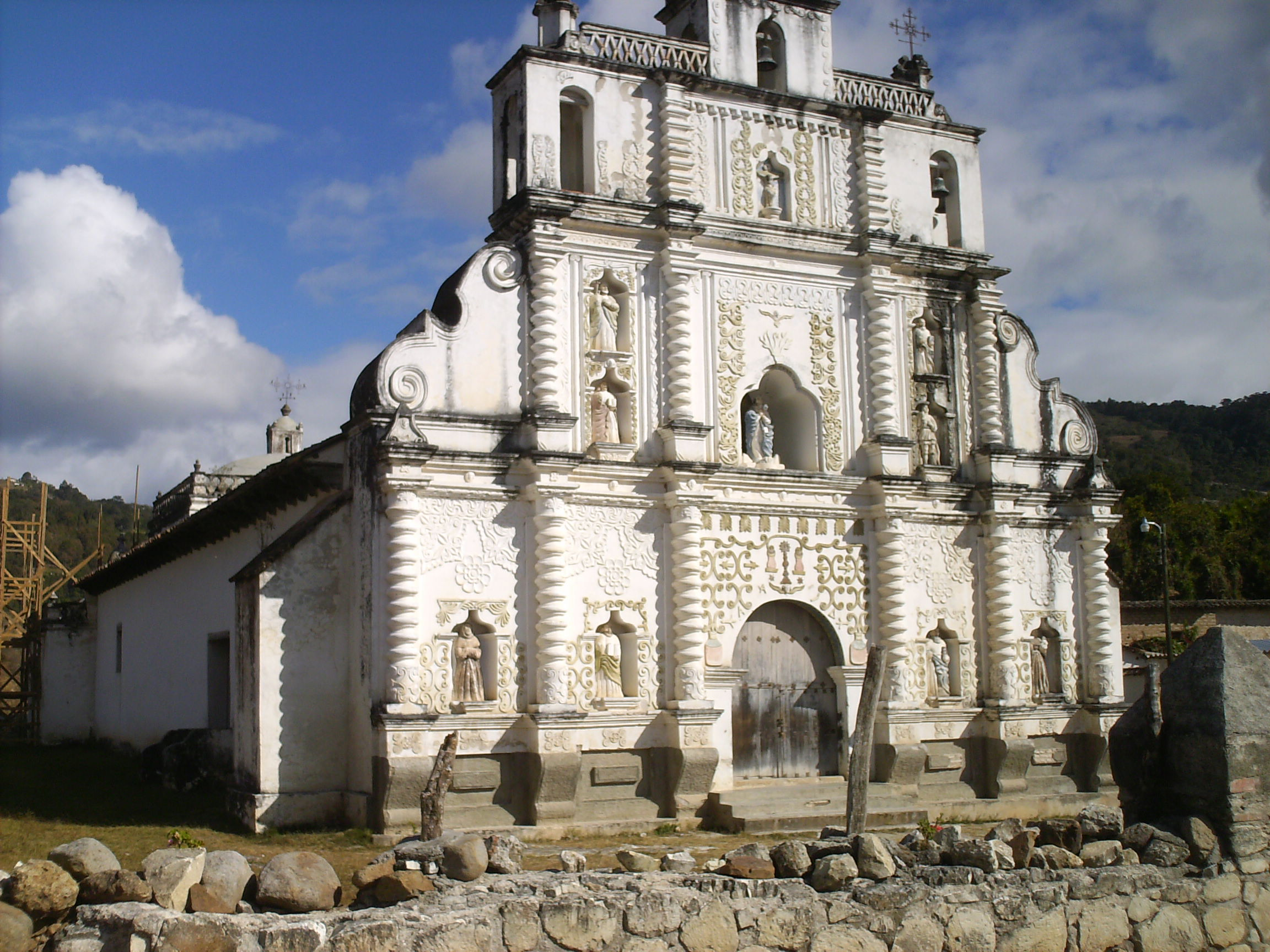
- The Old Colonial Church of San Manuel de Colohete

- Location in Honduras
- Coordinates: 14°27′N 88°40′W
- Country: Honduras
- Department: Lempira
- Municipality since: 2 February 1901; 125 years ago

Area
  - Municipality: 172 km^{2} (66 sq mi)

Population (2015)
  - Municipality: 14,583
  - Density: 84.8/km^{2} (220/sq mi)
  - Urban: 1,500

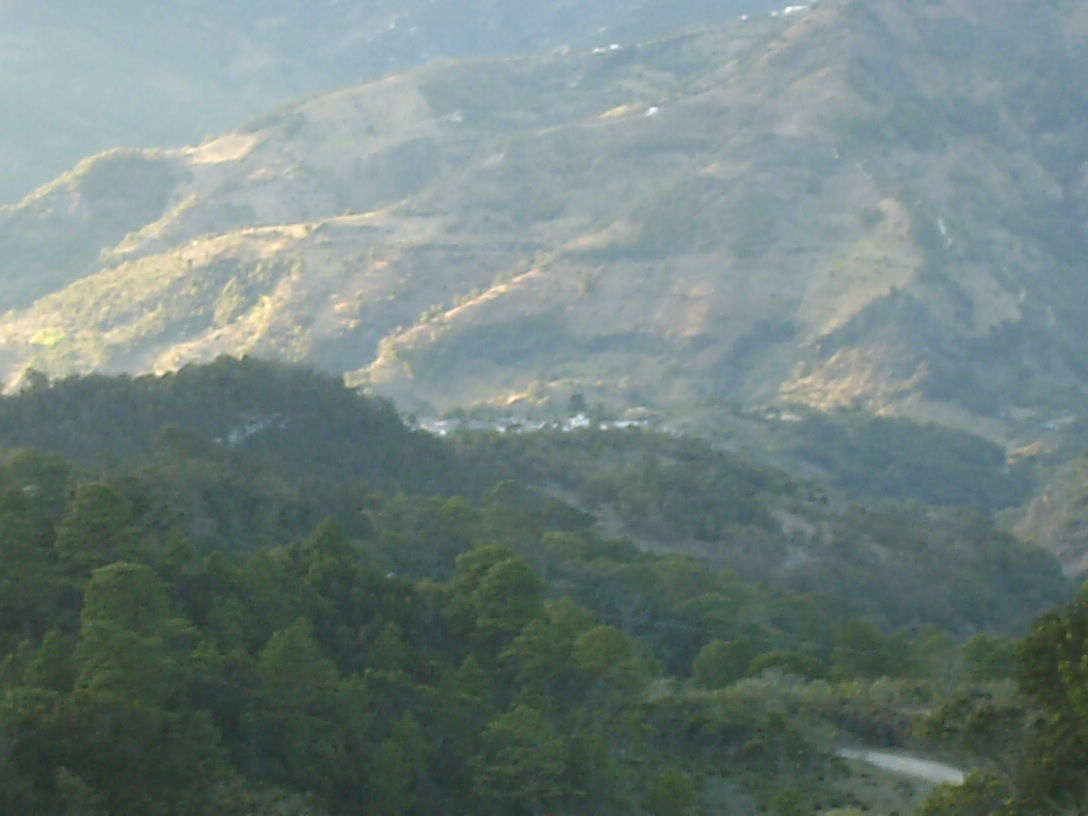
Panoramic View from Santa Teresita community

San Manuel Colohete (Spanish pronunciation: [sam maˈnwel koloˈete]) is a municipality in the Honduran department of Lempira, located approximately twenty miles southwest of the departmental capital of Gracias. The population of the entire municipality is around 15,000 but within the town center about 1,500.

San Manuel's principal landmark is the late 17th-century Spanish-built church. Featuring seven statues of saints set into niches on its massive façade, the interior is painted with an original mud-based paint that is still visible centuries later, as well as a sculpted and gilded altar. Some parts of the church have been recently restored but plans for a large-scale renovation have stalled. The town is also on the route used by hikers coming from or going to hike nearby Celaque, the tallest mountain in Honduras, which dominates vistas around San Manuel.

== History ==
In the census of 1887, it was a settlement of a village of "Concepcion Colohete" in Gracias municipality as it was now back then. In the administration of Terencio Sierra, the municipality of "San Manuel Colohete" was created on 2 February 1901. The word "Colohete" means in Indian language: "Cradle of Scorpions". The former inhabitants were the warriors of the brave chief Lempira.

== Geography ==
It is located in a flat part in the middle of a mountain. The vegetation has 3 traits: pine forests, dry sub tropical forests and some of the hills around are covered only with bushes and undergrowth. The mountains and hills around the capital are very steep. The weather is mostly cool, except during the summer season. Its villages and settlements are located on big depressions around the municipality capital.

== Boundaries ==
Its boundaries are:

- North: Gracias municipalities.
- South: La Campa and San Sebatián municipalities.
- East: La Campa municipality.
- West: San Sebastián municipality and Ocotepeque department.
- Surface Extents: 172 km^{2}

== Resources ==
San Manuel Colohete is a very good place for coffee; due to its elevation from the sea level. Beans and corn are very common in this area. The capital has electricity and mobile communications services. Raising cattle is mostly for local consumption. In some houses, people sell gasoline and diesel fuels. Also there is a small limestone quarry, on the way to the municipal capital.

== Population ==
- Population: For the year 2001 the figure was 10,908; and in accordance with estimates it is expected to have 14,583 for 2015.
- Villages: 10
- Settlements: 85

=== Demographics ===
At the time of the 2013 Honduras census, San Manuel Colohete municipality had a population of 14,063. Of these, 96.08% were Indigenous (96.03% Lenca), 3.73% Mestizo, 0.18% Black or Afro-Honduran and 0.01% others.

== Tourism ==
- Local holidays: La Concepción Inmaculada day is celebrated on 8 December. San Manuel was formerly known as Concepción Colohete.
