= Lempira Department =

Lempira Department Departamento de Lempira
- Department
- Flag

- Location of Lempira in Honduras
- Coordinates: 14°35′N 88°35′W
- Country: Honduras
- Municipalities: 28
- Villages: 303
- Founded: 28 June 1825 (Note: Lempira was one of the first 7 departments in which the national territory was divided in the first political division of Honduras in 1825.)
- Capital city: Gracias

Government
  - Type: Departmental
  - Governor: Steffany Mishell Rosa Guevara (2026–present) (National Party of Honduras)

Area
  - Total: 4,285 km^{2} (1,654 sq mi)

Population (2015)
  - Total: 333,125
  - Density: 77.74/km^{2} (201.4/sq mi)

GDP (Nominal, 2015 US dollar)
  - Total: $700 million (2023)
  - Per capita: $3,700 (2023)

GDP (PPP, 2015 int. dollar)
  - Total: $1.5 billion (2023)
  - Per capita: $1,800 (2023)
- Time zone: UTC-6 (CDT)
- Postal code: 42101, 42201
- ISO 3166 code: HN-LE
- HDI (2021): 0.544 low · 18th of 18
- Statistics derived from Consult INE online database: Population and Housing Census 2013

Lempira is one of the 18 departments—a territorial division roughly comparable to a U.S. state—in Honduras. located in the western part of the country, it is bordered by the departments of Ocotepeque and Copán to the west, Intibucá to the east, and Santa Bárbara to the north. To its south lies the El Salvador–Honduras border. The departmental capital is Gracias.

It was named Gracias department until 1943. In colonial times, Gracias was an early important administrative center for the Spaniards. It eventually lost importance to Antigua, in Guatemala.

Lempira is a rugged department, and it is relatively isolated from the rest of the country. The highest mountain peak in Honduras, Cerro las Minas, is in Lempira. The department was named after Lempira, a local chieftain of the Lenca people who fought against the Spanish conquistadores in the early 16th century. Opals are mined near the town of Erandique.

The department covers a total surface area of 4,290 km^{2}. In 2005, had an estimated population of 277,910.

Lempira is one of the poorest departments of the whole country and has the lowest Human Development Index.

== Municipalities ==
1. Belén
2. Candelaria
3. Cololaca
4. Erandique
5. Gracias
6. Gualcince
7. Guarita
8. La Campa
9. La Iguala
10. Las Flores
11. La Unión
12. La Virtud
13. Lepaera
14. Mapulaca
15. Piraera
16. San Andrés
17. San Francisco
18. San Juan Guarita
19. San Manuel Colohete
20. San Marcos de Caiquín
21. San Rafael
22. San Sebastián
23. Santa Cruz
24. Talgua
25. Tambla
26. Tomalá
27. Valladolid
28. Virginia
