= Gracias =

Gracias Ciudad de los confines
- Municipality
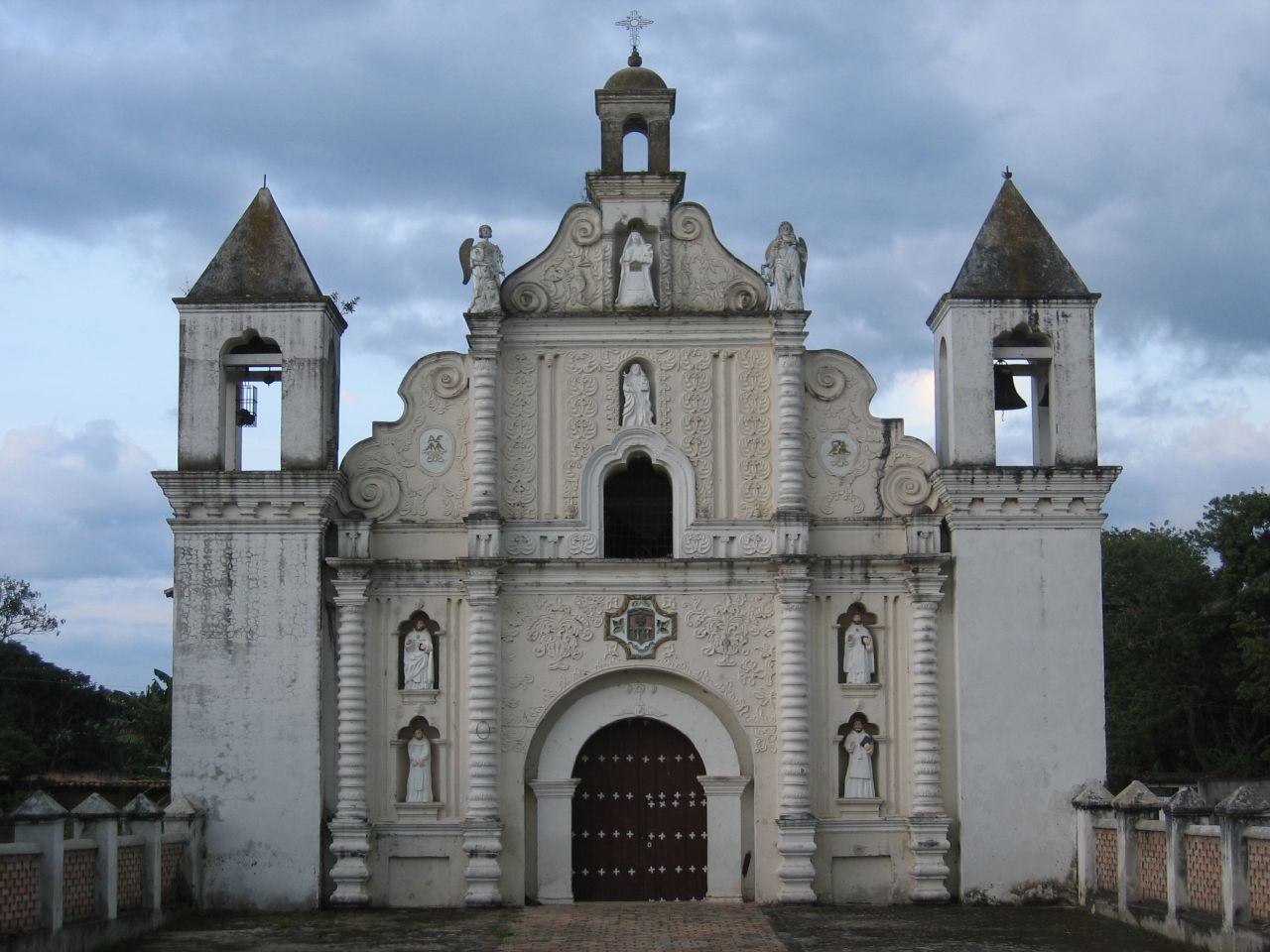
- La Merced church from the XVII century.

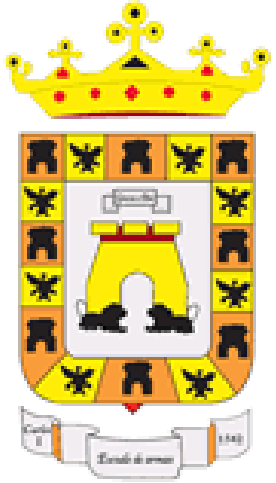
- Coat of arms

- Location in Honduras
- Coordinates: 14°35′20″N 88°34′55″W
- Country: Honduras
- Department: Lempira
- Founded: 1536; 490 years ago

Area
  - Total: 449 km^{2} (173 sq mi)
- Elevation: 800 m (2,600 ft)

Population (2023 projection)
  - Total: 61,421
  - Density: 137/km^{2} (354/sq mi)
- Climate: Aw
- Website: Official website

Gracias (Spanish pronunciation: [ˈɡɾasjas]) is a small Honduran town/municipality that was founded in 1536, and is the capital of Lempira Department.

The municipality has a population of 61,421 and the town a population of 18,550 (2023 calculation). It is located in the mountainous center of western Honduras.

== Etymology ==
The word gracias means "thanks" in Spanish. It is said that upon arriving at the site of the city of Gracias, the Spanish explorers, tired after having trekked through the mountainous terrain, said "Gracias a Dios hemos llegado a tierra plana," meaning "Thank God we have arrived at flat land."

== History ==
=== Foundation ===
The city was founded in October 1536 under the name of "Gracias a Dios" by Gonzalo de Alvarado y Chávez, Pedro de Alvarado's first cousin, in a place called Opoa, near the banks of the Higuito River. During The viceregal era, Gracias was very important for the Spanish and had some years of growth, before being eclipsed by the cities of Antigua Guatemala and Comayagua.

On January 14, 1539, the city of Gracias a Dios was named Municipality by Don Juan de Montejo Note 1 Mass was celebrated there by the then Bishop of Honduras Cristóbal de Pedraza.

=== Headquarters of the Royal Court and Chancery of Los Confines ===
By means of a Royal Certificate dated September 3, 1543 given in the city of Valladolid (Kingdom of Castile), on May 16, 1544 it was established as the seat of the Royal Court of the Confines, officially called "Royal Court and Chancery of the Confines of Guatemala and Nicaragua ". Its first president was Alonso de Maldonado y Solís (1543-1548), along with several oidores with instruction in jurisprudence. The appointed magistrates were: Diego de Herrera, Pedro Ramírez de Quiñonez and Don Juan Roxel, all Spanish. This audience was in charge of applying the laws emanating from Spain and representing the rights of the Crown in the face of land claims, encomiendas and taxes, as well as administering justice in various instances and fulfilling another varied range of duties.

The Audiencia was transferred in 1549 to the city of Santiago de Guatemala (today Antigua Guatemala). Perhaps this decision was unfortunate for the unity of Central America, since it placed the headquarters of the higher authorities at the eastern end of the kingdom of Guatemala, while Gracias offered a much more central location, intermediate between the northern and southern provinces.

In 1863, after the general elections were held, General José María Medina assumed the presidency of the State of Honduras in the city of Gracias, due to the fact that he was on vacation at the ranch of his property nearby.

On December 11, 1949, the public drinking water service was inaugurated in the city of Gracias.

=== Battles ===
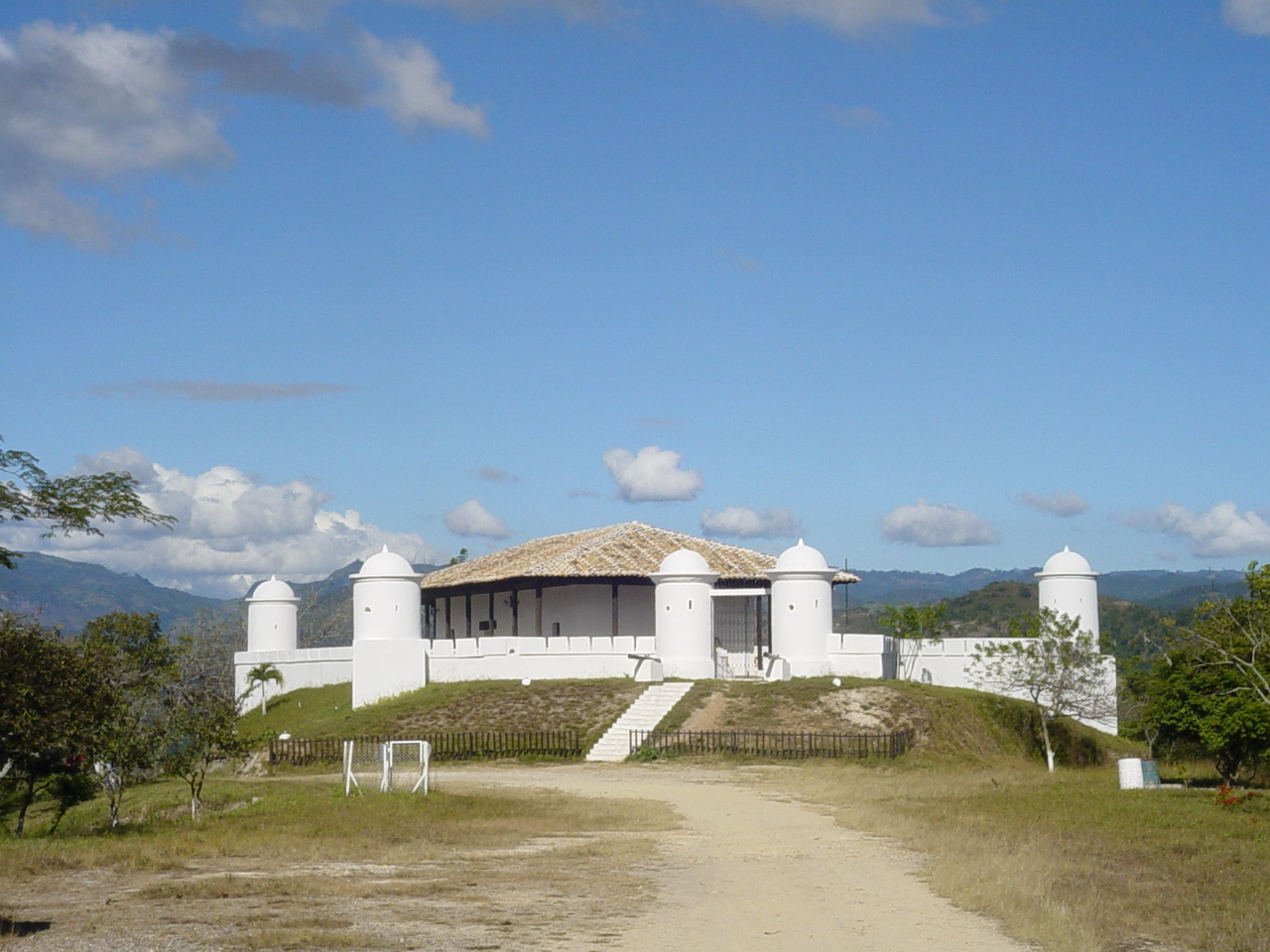
Fortress of Gracias Lempira.

During the events of the civil war of 1919, Colonels Vicente Tosta Carrasco, Flavio Delcid and Gregorio Ferrera, together with Captain Natividad Pérez, led the “Western Revolutionary Army”, starting their war operations in western Honduras. On August 11 at 5 a.m., they attacked the city of Gracias. The defending troops were under the command of General José León Castro. After a hard fight, the invaders took over the plaza and government offices5 and then left for Santa Rosa de Copán.

During the civil war of 1924, on February 7, the city of Gracias fell into the hands of rebel forces under the command of officers General Vicente Tosta Carrasco and General Gregorio Ferrera.6

During the rebellion of General Gregorio Ferrera, he gave up attacking the city when he realized that General José León Castro "El León de Occidente" was posted as commander of arms, along with his officers General Leonardo del Cid and General Concepción. Peralta, in command of a large and organized army.

In 1959, there was a rebellion between the commanders of the Third Military Zone of Honduras that included the departments of Copán, Lempira, Ocotepeque, and Santa Bárbara. The headquarters was in the city of Santa Rosa de Copán, but rebel officers transferred it to Gracias and took Fort San Cristóbal as a defensive bastion. After a short fight, two soldiers lost their lives and the rebellion was unsuccessful, recovering tranquility and Colonel Armando Flores Carías was appointed as the new commander.

=== Modern day ===
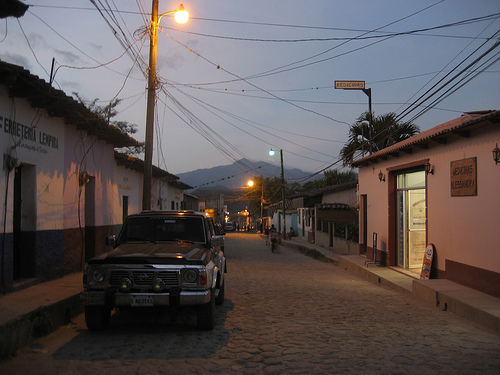
A street of Gracias.

The city is one of the most visited tourist sites by Hondurans and has experienced an improvement in infrastructure since the beginning of the last decade, such as the restoration of its historic buildings such as the Iglesia de la Merced among others dating from the colonial period. The estimated population level of the city of Gracias has also increased for 2018 was 54,404 people: 26,520 men and 27,885 women; with a population of 15,490 people in urban areas and 38,915 in rural areas. Most of them have a Basic educational level (up to sixth grade) and are dedicated to agriculture, livestock, forestry and fishing. 78% of households cook with firewood and 11% of them have their own car. 26% of the population self-identify within the Lenca ethnic group.

The city has several banking agencies, restaurants, markets, the Doctor Juan Manuel Gálvez Hospital, university centers, secondary, primary and university schools, call centers, radio stations, local UHF television stations and clabe and various handicraft stores. This thanks to the socio-economic improvement by both national and foreign tourism. It also has a 1,300-meter long runway for aircraft, inaugurated on October 28, 2013.

== Demographics ==
At the time of the 2013 Honduras census, Gracias municipality had a population of 47,622. Of these, 71.11% were Mestizo, 26.74% Indigenous (26.41% Lenca), 1.40% White, 0.74% Black or Afro-Honduran and 0.01% others.

== Geography ==
Elevation ranges from roughly 800 meters at the town square to 2,870 meters at the peak of Montaña Celaque (also known as Cerro Las Minas). Climate is greatly influenced by elevation, with the low-lying portions having a wet-dry (monsoonal) pattern. Montaña Celaque is the highest mountain and largest cloud forest in Honduras, and is protected through Celaque Mountain National Park.

== Transportation ==
Gracias serves as a transportation hub for the immediate region. The town is connected to the northern city of Santa Rosa de Copan by a paved 2 lane highway, and construction of a paved 2 lane highway to La Esperanza has been underway for several years.

== Economy ==
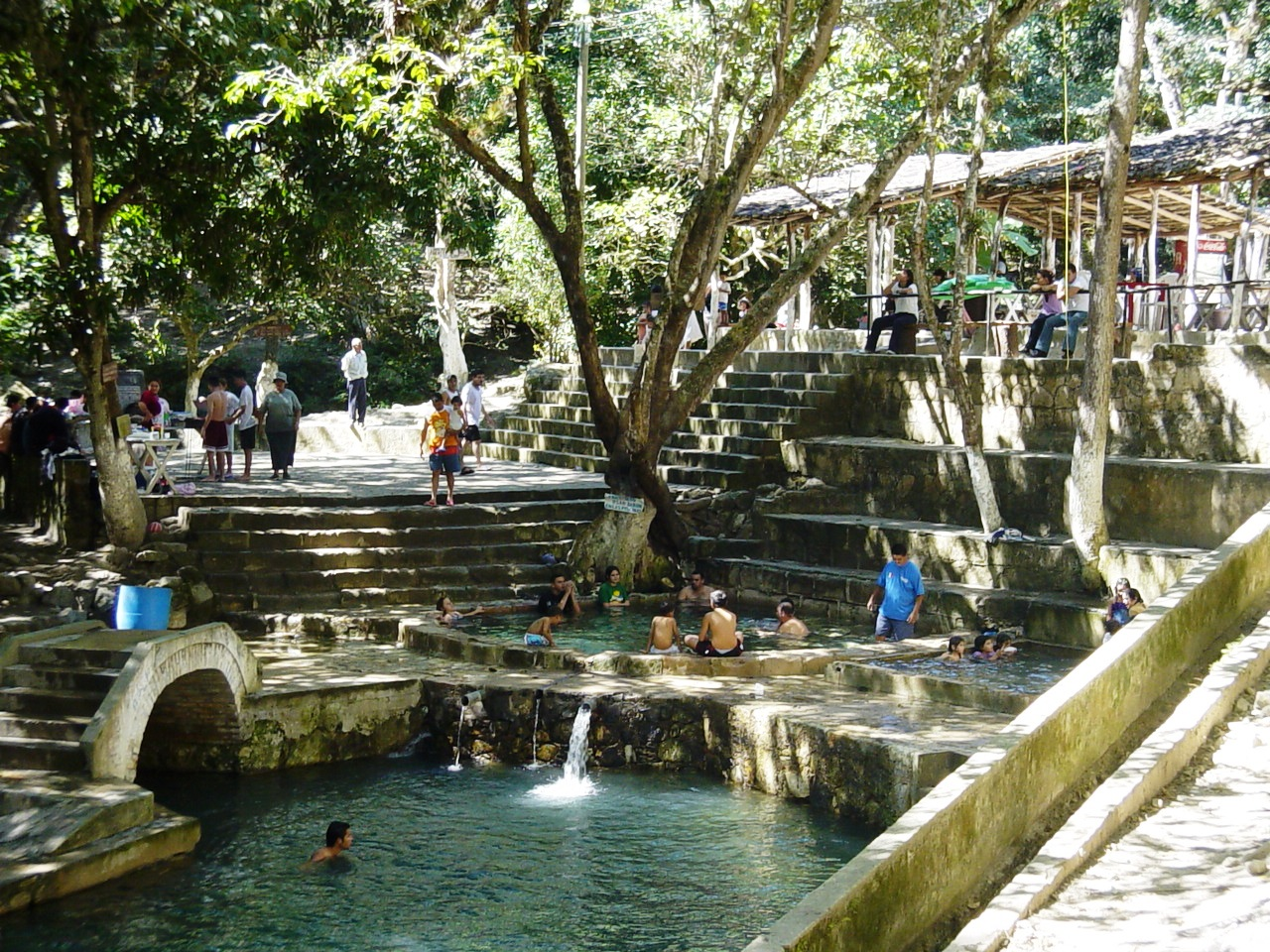
The hot springs of Gracias

Agriculture is both subsistence and export based. Agricultural crops vary with elevation and climate, with corn and beans grown at lower altitudes and fruits/vegetables grown at higher altitudes.

The development of a tourist economy is seen as a driver of economic development. This tourism is based on the town's historic and natural attractions including colonial churches, Celaque Mountain and hot springs.

== See also ==
- San Cristóbal fortress (Honduras)
