= Neria =

Neria may refer to:

- Neria (film), Zimbabwean 1993 film
- Neria (fly), genus of stilt-legged flies
- Neria, Mateh Binyamin, the West Bank village

== See also ==
- Neri (disambiguation)
