= Nery =

Nery may refer to:

== People ==
=== Given name ===
- Nery Bareiro (born 1988), Paraguayan football player
- Nery Brenes (born 1985), Costa Rican sprinter
- Nery Cano (1956–2021)
- Nery Cardozo (born 1989), Paraguayan football player
- Nery Castillo (born 1984), Mexican football player
- Nery Domínguez (born 1990), Argentinian football player
- Nery Fernández (born 1981), Paraguayan football player
- Nery Franco (born 1959), Paraguayan football player
- Nery Geremias Orellana (1985–2011), Honduran radio station manager
- Nery Kennedy (born 1973), Paraguayan javelin thrower
- Nery Leyes (born 1989), Argentinian football player
- Nery Mantey Niangkouara (born 1983), Greek swimmer
- Nery McKeen (born 1957), Cuban middle distance runner
- Nery Medina (born 1981), Honduran football player
- Nery Minchez (born 1963), Guatemalan weightlifter
- Nery Ortíz (born 1973), Paraguayan football player
- Nery Pumpido (born 1957), Argentinian football player and manager
- Nery Saguilán (born 1988), Mexican boxer
- Nery Santos Gómez (Caracas, Venezuela, 1967), Venezuelan-American author
- Nery Soto, Honduran journalist
- Nery Veloso (born 1987), Chilean football player

=== Surname ===
- Adalgisa Nery (1905–1980), Brazilian poet, journalist and politician
- Alex Felipe Nery (born 1975), Brazilian football player
- Carl Nery (1917–2007), American American football player
- Constância Nery (born 1936), Latin American painter
- Filipe Nery Rodrigues, Indian politician
- Filipe Nery Xavier (1801–1875)
- Guillaume Néry (born 1982), French free diver
- Gustavo Nery, Brazilian football player
- Hadson Nery (born 1981), Brazilian football manager
- Harison da Silva Nery (born 1980), Brazilian football player
- Ismael Nery (1900–1934), Brazilian artist
- Jessica Nery Plata (born 1994), Mexican boxer
- João W. Nery (1950–2018), Brazilian writer, psychologist, and LGBT activist
- Loris Néry (born 1991), French football player
- Luis Nery (boxer) (born 1994), Mexican boxer
- Luis Nery (model) (born 1978), Venezuelan model
- Luis Nery Caballero (born 1990), Paraguayan football player
- Nery (footballer) (1892–1927), Brazilian football player
- Paulo Ricardo Nery (born 1962), Brazilian musician
- Peter Solis Nery, Filipino poet, fictionist, author, and filmmaker
- Ron Nery (1934–2002), American American football player
- Sebastião Nery, Brazilian writer and journalist

== Places ==
- Mont Néry, mountain in northwestern Italy
- Néry, northern France, a commune

== Other ==
- Affair of Néry

== See also ==
- Neri (disambiguation)
