= Neris (disambiguation) =

The Neris is a river in Lithuania and Belarus.

Neris may also refer to:

== People ==
- Catherine Néris, French politician
- Efraín López Neris, Puerto Rican actor
- Héctor Neris, Dominican baseball player
- Hueglo Neris, Brazilian footballer
- Matheus Neris, another Brazilian footballer
- José Neris, Uruguayan footballer
- Salomėja Nėris, Lithuanian writer

== Other ==
- Neris (Cynuria), a village in Ancient Greece
- Néris-les-Bains, a commune in France
- FK Neris Vilnius, former football club in Lithuania

== See also ==
- Neri (disambiguation)
