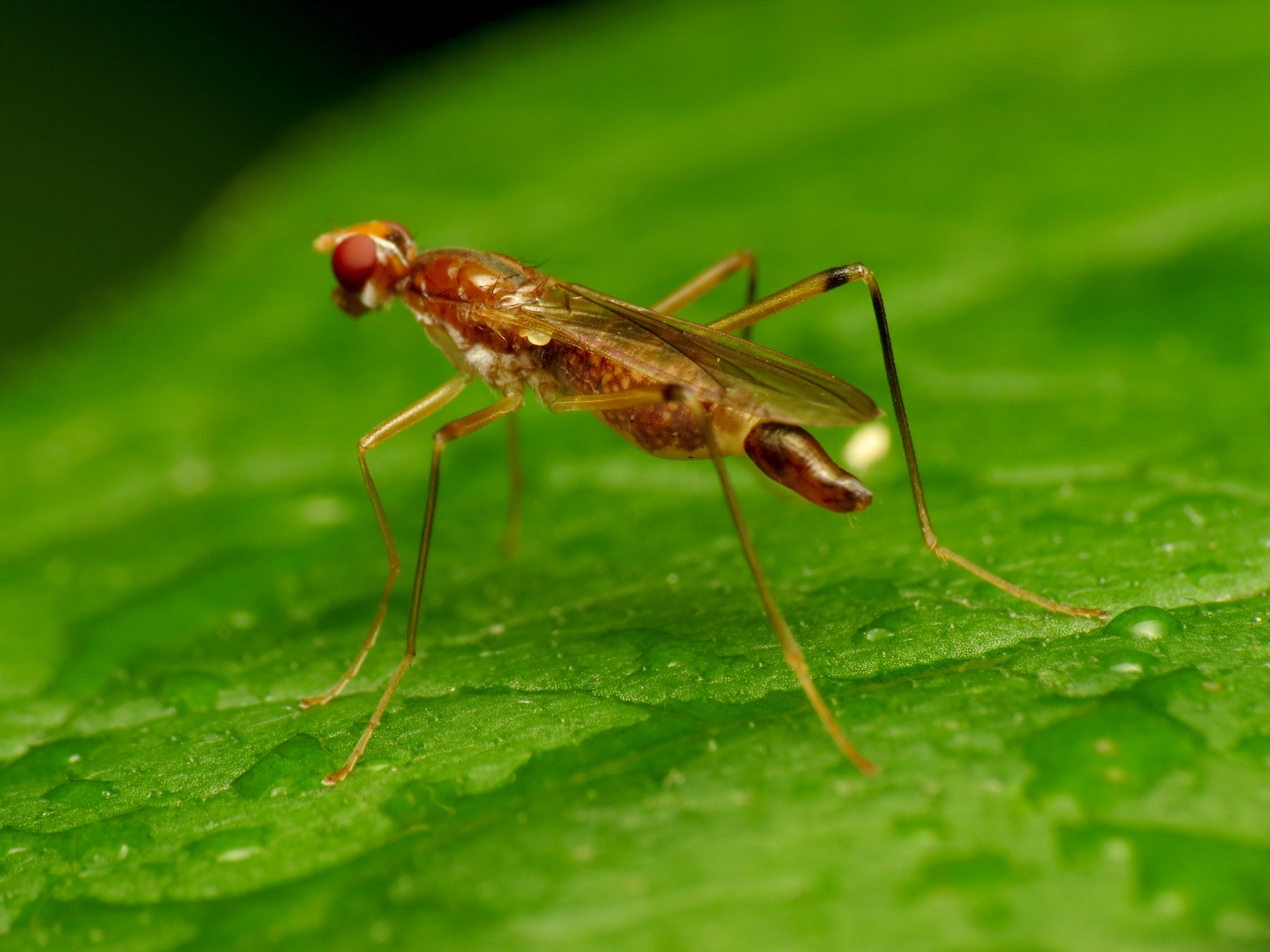
- Compsobata univitta (female)

Scientific classification
- Kingdom: Animalia
- Phylum: Arthropoda
- Class: Insecta
- Order: Diptera
- Family: Micropezidae
- Genus: Compsobata
- Species: C. univitta

Binomial name
- Compsobata univitta (Walker, 1849)

Synonyms
- Calobata albiceps Wulp, 1883; Calobata univitta Walker, 1849

= Compsobata univitta =

Species of fly

Compsobata univitta is a species of stilt-legged flies in the family Micropezidae.
