= Compsobata mima =

Scientific classification
- Kingdom: Animalia
- Phylum: Arthropoda
- Clade: Pancrustacea
- Class: Insecta
- Order: Diptera
- Family: Micropezidae
- Genus: Compsobata
- Species: C. mima

Binomial name
- Compsobata mima (Hennig, 1936)

Synonyms
- Trepidaria mima Hennig, 1936

Species of fly

Compsobata mima is a species of stilt-legged flies in the family Micropezidae.
