= Piraera =

- Municipality
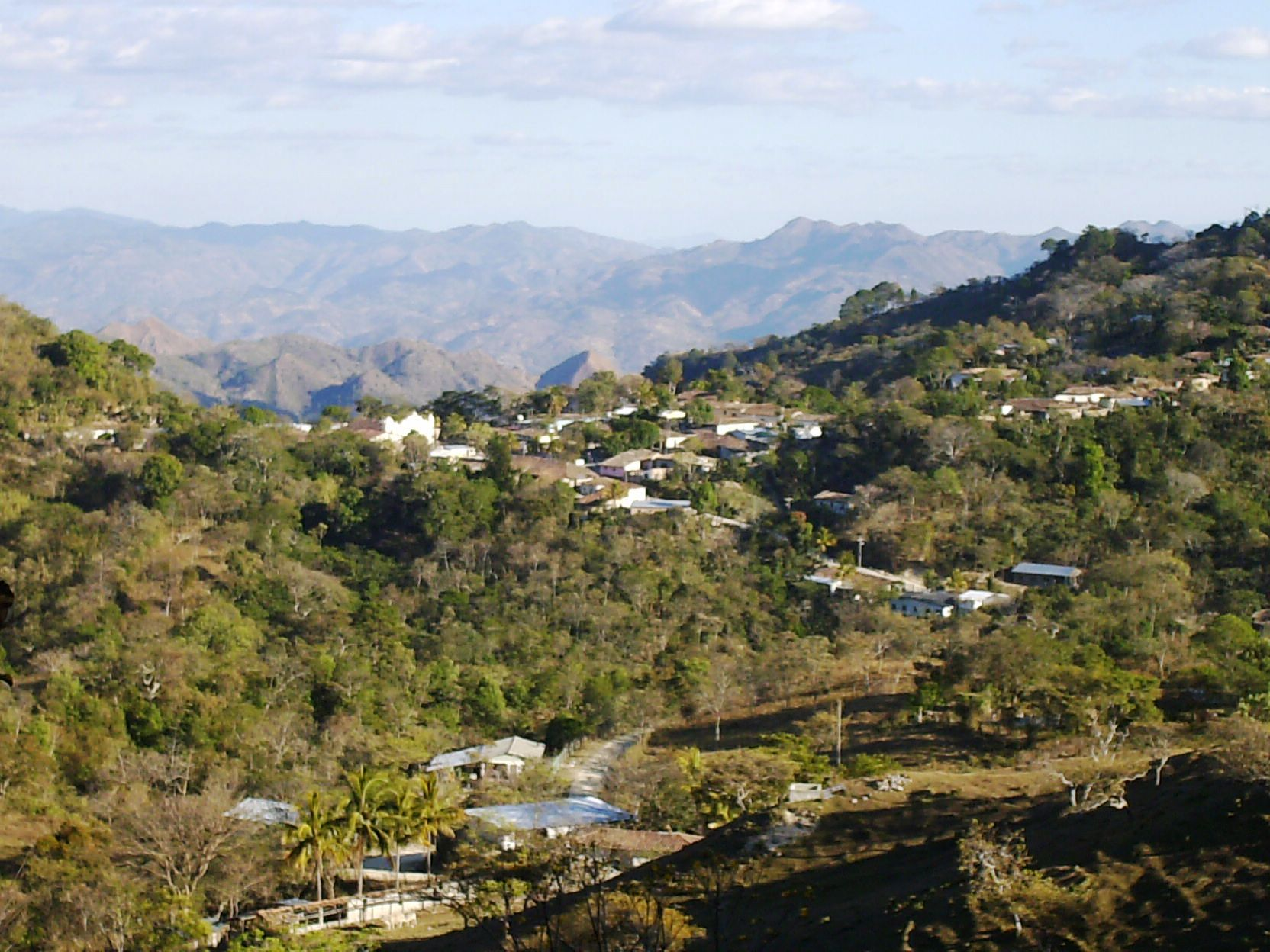
- Panoramic View of Piraera town

- Location in Honduras
- Coordinates: 14°04′N 88°28′W
- Country: Honduras
- Department: Lempira

Area
  - Total: 179 km^{2} (69 sq mi)

Population (2015)
  - Total: 14,124
  - Density: 78.9/km^{2} (204/sq mi)

Piraera is one of the municipalities of Lempira department in Honduras. It is located on one of the branches of "Congolón" mountain, it is 105 km away from the city of Gracias.

== History ==
Its first inhabitants came from San Antonio, Santa Lucia and Magdalena in Intibucá Department. In the population record of 1702 there were some people booked. In the census of 1791, it is a town part of "Curato" de Cerquin and in 1889 it was a municipality of Candelaria. It is supposed that Lempira, the national hero, received the power from "Etempic" chief when the Spanish arrived, lived in this municipality.

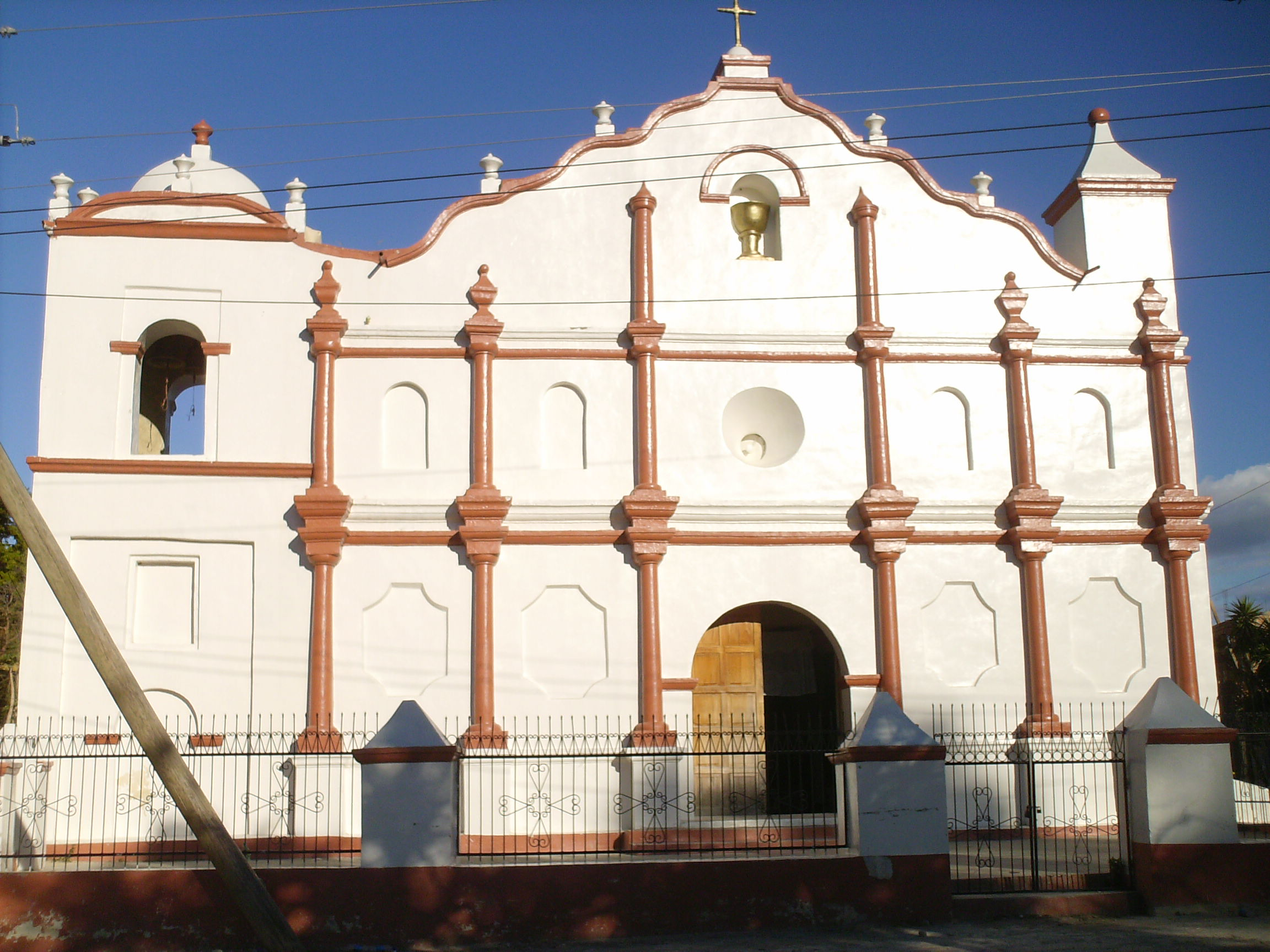
The Old Colonial Church

== Geography ==
Since it is located on the mountains, the main forests are Pines and Oaks. Its elevation above sea level is the proper one for coffee plantations. Its mountains and hills are very high and steep. It has several water springs running down the steep hills. One curiosity is a huge rock monolith on the way to the departmental capital, which proves the volcanic origins of the rocks in this municipality and the rest of the department.

== Boundaries ==
Its boundaries are:

- North : Gualcince and Erandique municipalities.
- South : Intibuca department and El Salvador.
- East : San Francisco municipality and Intibuca department.
- West : Candelaria and Virginia municipalities.
- Surface Extents: 179 km²

== Resources ==
Coffee is the main product up in Piraera, followed by cattle, milk derivates, corn, beans, and commerce. The trees are plenty and yield some income. It also has several water springs, for people and cattle and for the crops. As the rest of the department it has electricity, Internet access in the Mayor's and with mobile communication services. A few people sell fuels in their houses.

== Population ==
The majority of the population is Indigenous.

- Population: The population in 2001 was 11,420, and according to estimates by the INE Honduras, 14,124 is expected for 2015.
- Villages: 10
- Settlements: 105

=== Demographics ===
At the time of the 2013 Honduras census, Piraera municipality had a population of 13,758. Of these, 78.00% were Indigenous, 20.44% Mestizo, 1.50% Black or Afro-Honduran and 0.06% White.

== Tourism ==
The traveler must go through Santa Cruz, San Andrés and Gualcince municipalities. The deviation to Piraera is 85 kilometres (53 mi) from Gracias, to the left. This dirt road is repaired constantly along the year. The visitor must be careful during the rainy season due to landslides along the way. It has little to offer to visitors, it has the typical colonial distribution. Local activities include hiking in the hills, which have views of the volcanos of El Salvador, and Intibuca department. Also, there is a waterfall on the way.

Local holidays include "Santiago' Day on July 25, and "Sagrado Corazon Day" and "San Jose Day" both on October 19.
