= La Virtud =

- Municipality
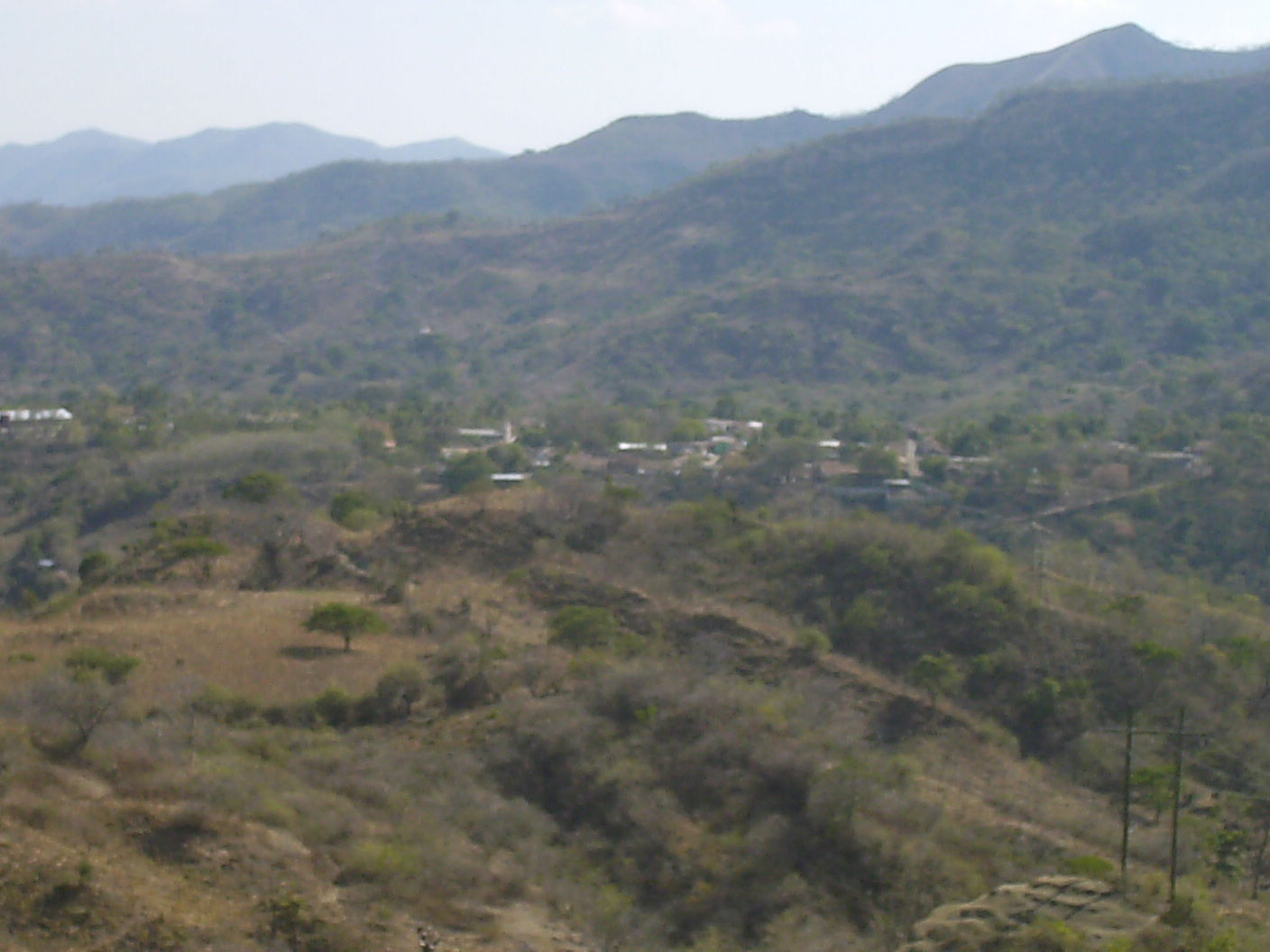
- Panoramic View

- Location in Honduras
- Coordinates: 14°03′N 88°41′W
- Country: Honduras
- Department: Lempira
- Municipality since: 1859

Area
  - Total: 83 km^{2} (32 sq mi)

Population (2015)
  - Total: 6,640
  - Density: 80/km^{2} (210/sq mi)

La Virtud (Spanish pronunciation: [la βiɾˈtuð]) is a municipality in the Honduran department of Lempira.

It is one of the municipalities of the Lempira department. It is also one of the furthest from the big cities in Honduras but near to El Salvador border. It takes up to 4 hours to get there taking either way of Gracias or Santa Rosa de Copán. However, the best way is via Santa Rosa de Copan-San Marcos de Ocotepeque-Cololaca-Valladolid-La Virtud.

== History ==
The very first settlers were Spanish from El Salvador, seeking fields for sowing the raw material for bluing. It is believed that its founder was a priest called Doroteo Alvarenga in 1775. It was granted a municipality back in 1859.

== Geography ==
The municipality capital is located in a valley and causing to decrease its elevation to sea level and the vegetations corresponds to the dry subtropical forest and the weather is hot throughout the year. Throughout the rest of the municipality there are some mountains and hills but the vegetation and weather are the same.

== Boundaries ==
Its boundaries are:

- North : Valladolid municipality.
- South : El Salvador.
- East : El Salvador.
- West : Gualcince and Mapulaca municipalities.

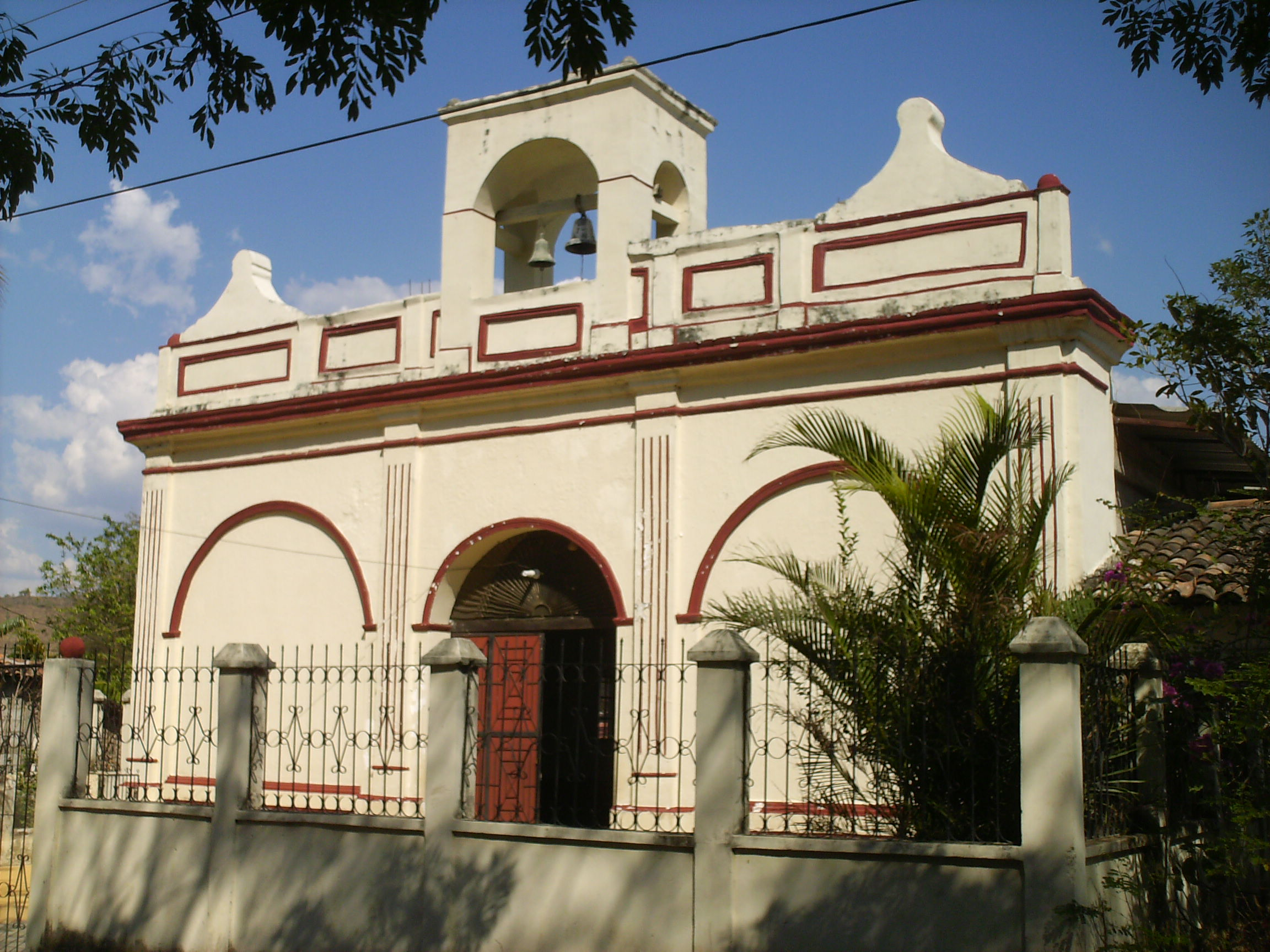
The old church in La Virtud

- Surface Extents: 83 km²

== Resources ==
The main activity is commerce, especially with El Salvador, so the US dollar is used as currency as well. The 2nd economical activity is cattle and milk products. There are a few gathering points for coffee grains. Corn and bean crops can not be absent. There is electricity in the municipality capital and hardware and grocery stores.

== Population ==
The majority of people is a cross-breed of native Indians and Spanish settlers, and there's a small amount of Indian descendants in the surrounding villages.

- Population: The figure was 6,133 people in 2001. Based on this, an estimate was elaborated for 2015, resulting in 6,640.
- Villages: 13
- Settlements: 48

=== Demographics ===
At the time of the 2013 Honduras census, La Virtud municipality had a population of 6,583. Of these, 55.52% were Mestizo, 28.95% Indigenous, 9.51% Black or Afro-Honduran, 5.94% White and 0.08% others.

== Tourism ==
It has the typical colonial Spanish distribution in the downtown area. Perhaps the best feature is going swimming in one the rivers nearby, one of those is the "Lempa" river on the border with El Salvador. For more information about hobbies and entertainment in this municipality go to the next link: La Virtud

- Local Holidays: "Virgen del Carmen" day in July and also "Virgen de Santa Barbara" day on December 4.
