= Gualcince =

- Municipality
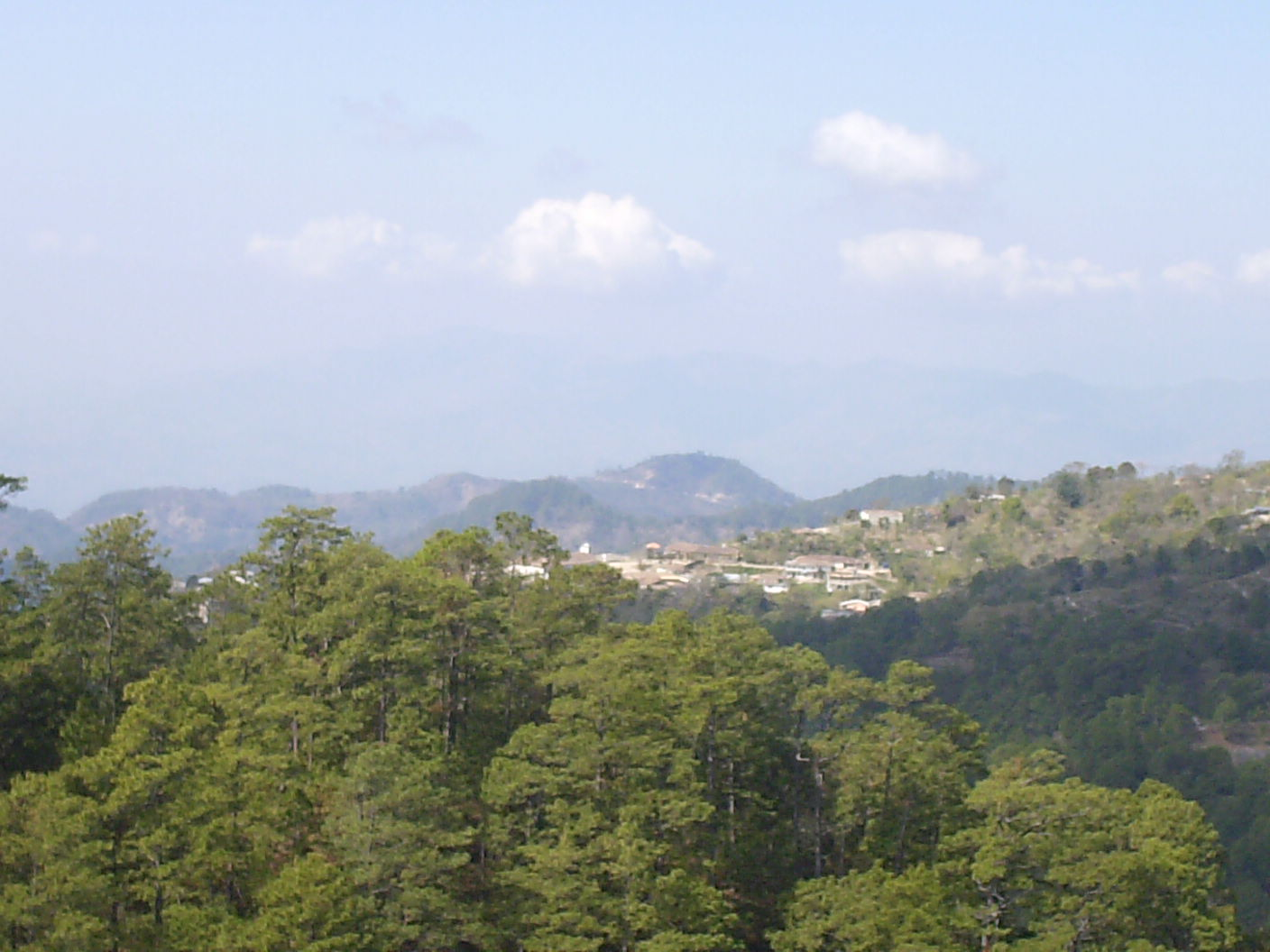
- Panoramic View of Gualcince

- Location in Honduras
- Coordinates: 14°07′N 88°33′W
- Country: Honduras
- Department: Lempira
- Municipality since: 1840

Area
  - Total: 163 km^{2} (63 sq mi)

Population (2015)
  - Total: 11,564
  - Density: 70.9/km^{2} (184/sq mi)

Gualcince (Spanish pronunciation: [ɡwalˈsinse]) is a municipality in the Honduran department of Lempira.

It is one of the several municipalities of the Lempira department. It is located 78 km from Gracias city. It is necessary to pass by San Juan, Intibuca and through the municipalities of Santa Cruz and San Andrés. It has 2 accesses, which separate from the main road that leads to southern municipalities. The road is constantly being repaired. There are several sections of this roads that are narrow, so careful driving is advised, especially for buses and trucks.

== History ==
It was first called "Gualán". There is no accurate date for its foundation, but in some old books of real state, it is registered that the Catholic Church was built back in 1,576. In the census of 1,791 it was the capital of the "Cerquin" curato. In the national division of 1889 was one of the municipalities of Candelaria district. It became a municipality in 1840.

== Geography ==
It has huge mountains covered with pine forests. One of them is "Congolon" mountain. These mountain are favorable for coffee plantations and also for water springs.

== Boundaries ==
Its boundaries are:

- North : San Andrés and Erandique municipalities.
- South : Mapulaca and Candelaria municipalities.
- East : Piraera municipality.
- West : La Virtud municipality.
- Surface Extents: 163 km^{2}

== Resources ==
The Coffee plantations are the main economical activity, and the geography has a lot to do with it. Corn and beans can not be excluded since they are part of the national diet. The cattle raising is only for local consumption. The vegetables are scarce there for they are brought from other municipalities and even from other departments, such as Intibuca.

== Population ==
The cross-breed of Spanish settlers and native Indian represents half of the population. The 2nd half consists of native Indians descendants.

- Population: this municipality had about 9,537 people. The INE used this figure to elaborate estimates, and the number of people in 2008 could be 10,681.
- Villages: 12
- Settlements: 103

=== Demographics ===
At the time of the 2013 Honduras census, Gualcince municipality had a population of 11,295. Of these, 73.69% were Indigenous, 20.64% Mestizo, 0.89% Black or Afro-Honduran, 0.19% White and 4.59% others.

== Tourism ==
Gualcince displays landscapes of high and steep pine forest mountains, and old buildings such as the Catholic Church and some houses that are still occupied. It does not have any hostels, but Candelaria is 40 minutes away. Grocery stores make it easier to spend some time there. One popular dish there, is the "Pupusas de Flor de Oroco".

- Local Holidays: December 8; "Inmaculapa Concepcion" day.

== Gallery ==
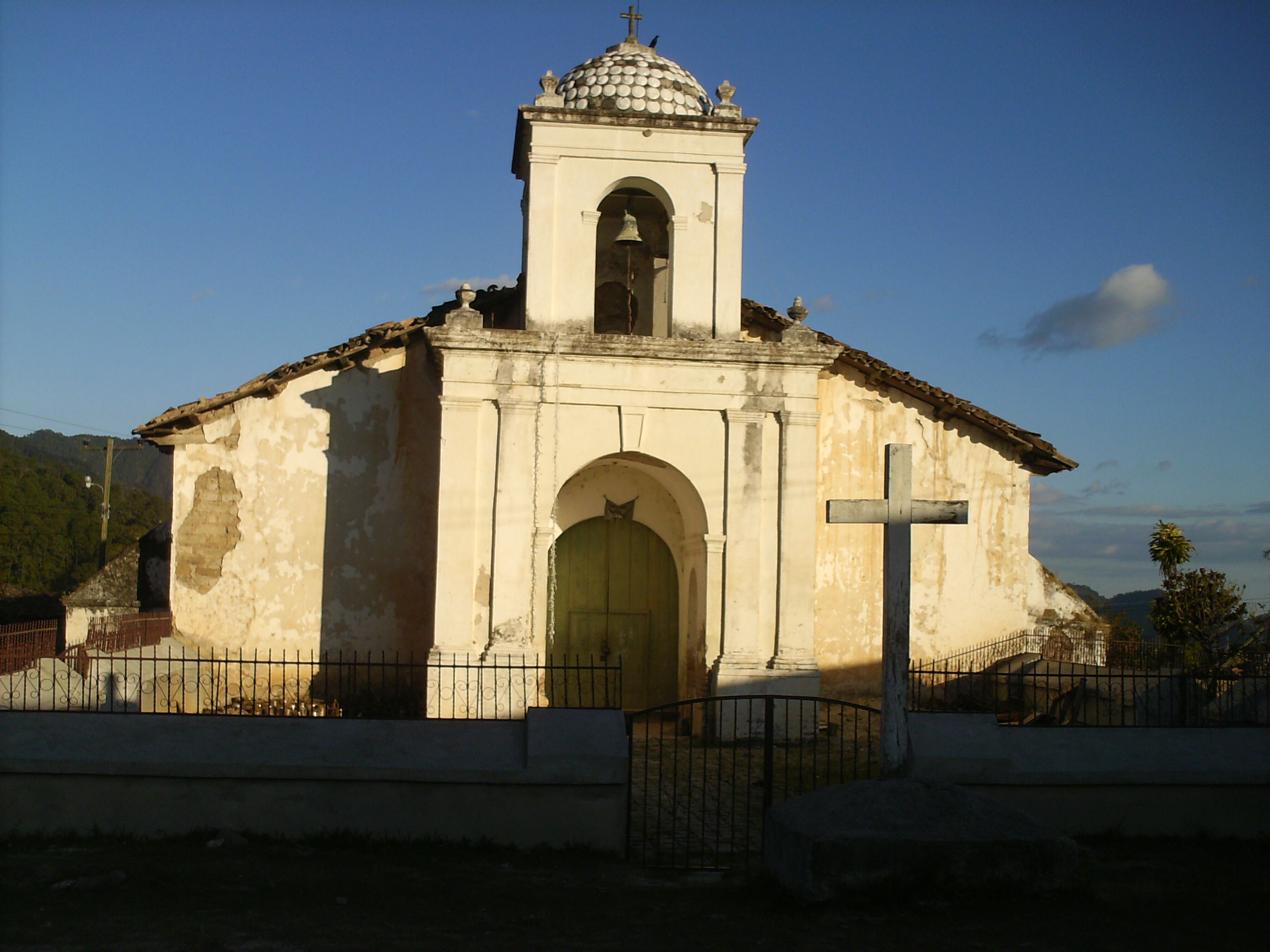
Old Colonial Church of Gualcince

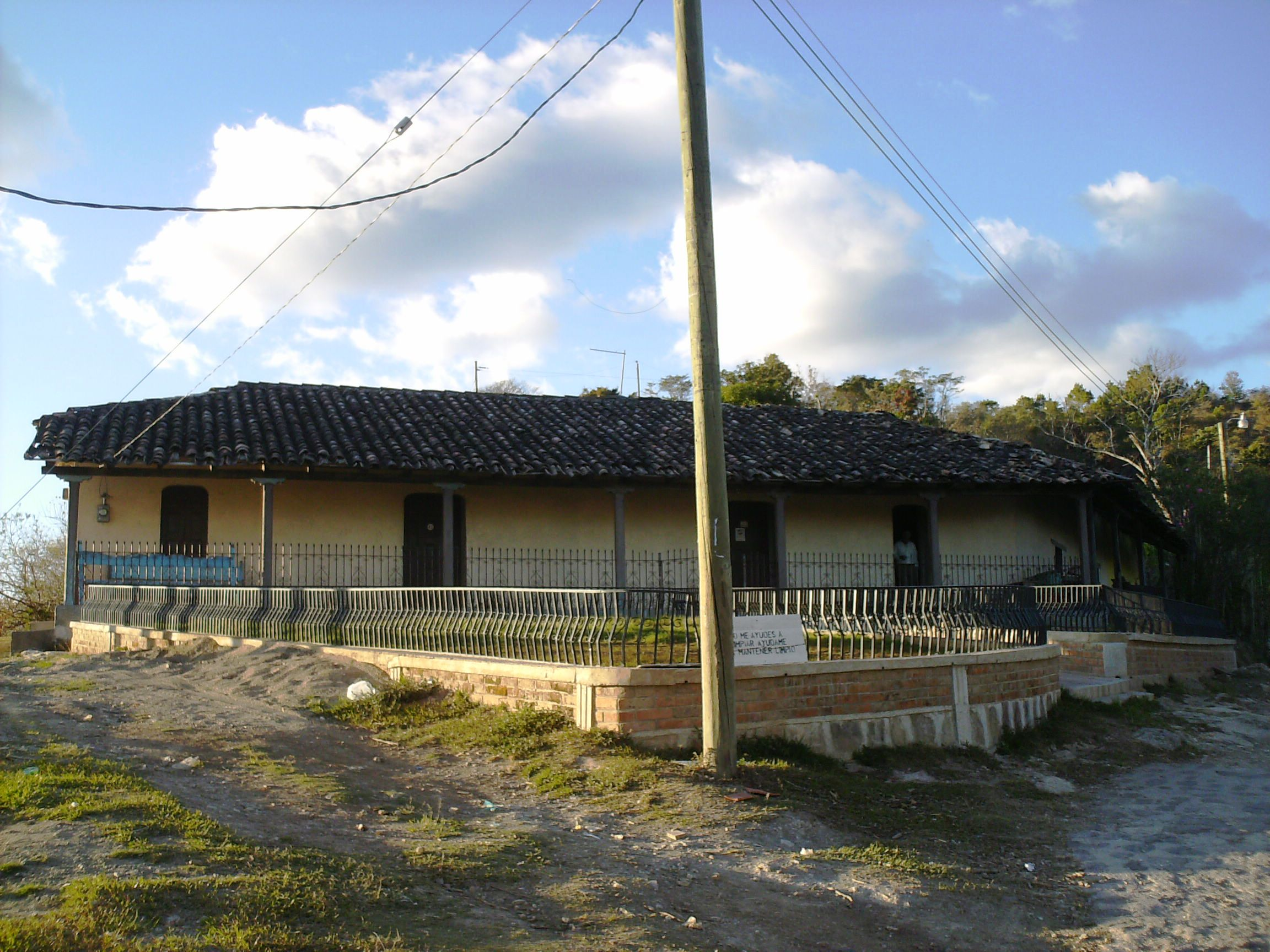
Mayor's Office of Gualcince

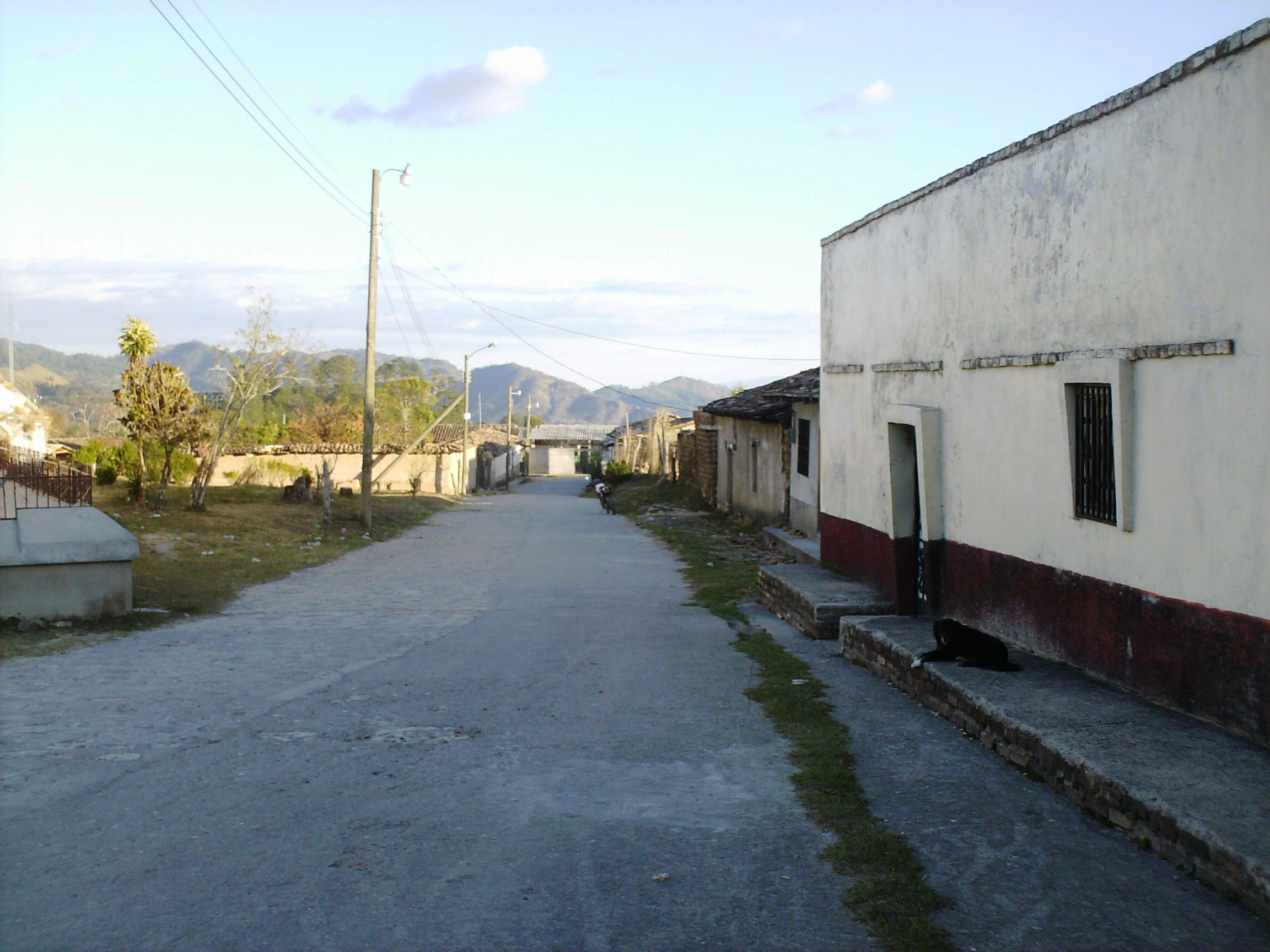
Streets of Gualcince

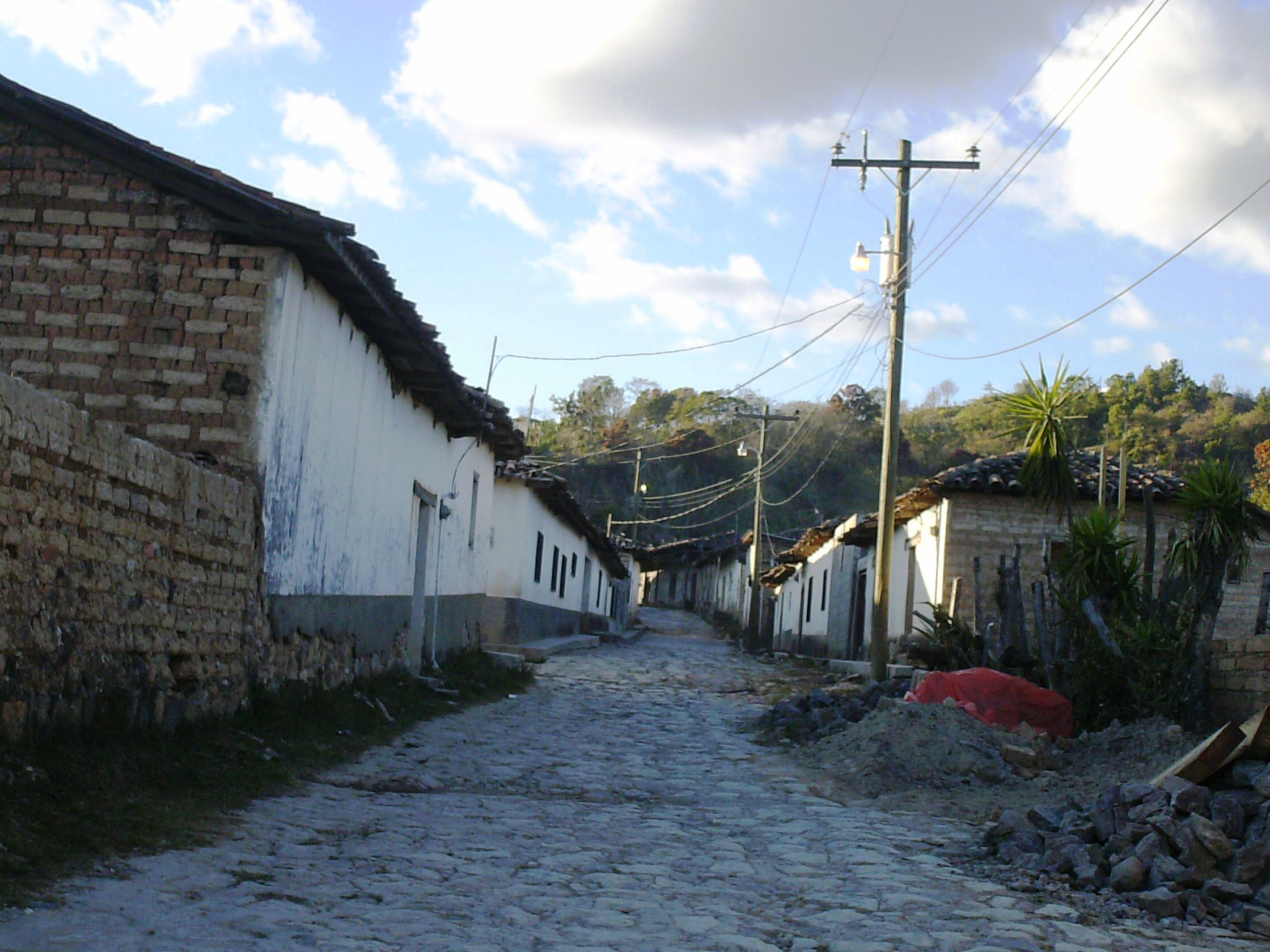
A Street in Gualcince

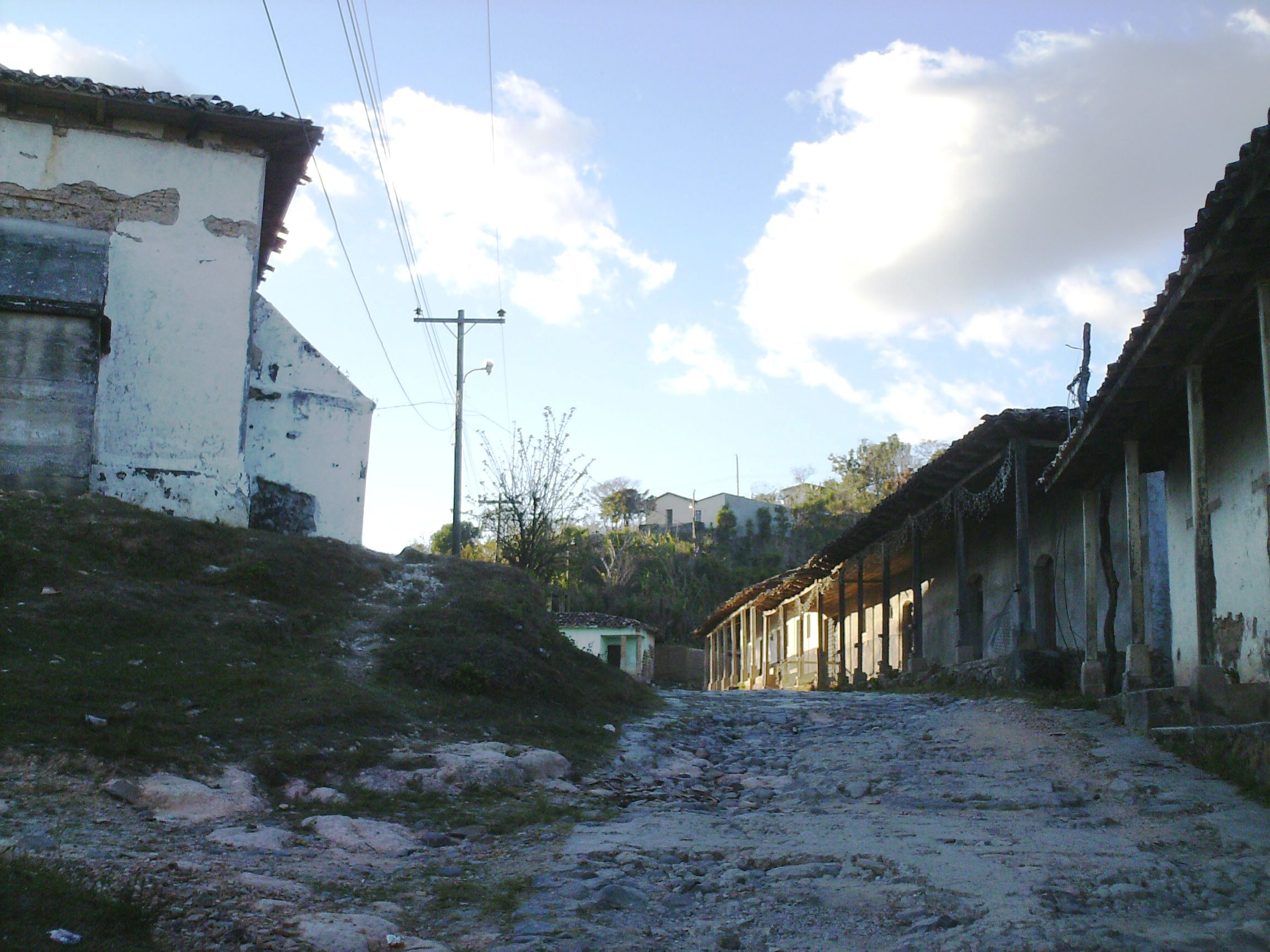
A Street in Gualcince
