= Mapulaca =

- Municipality
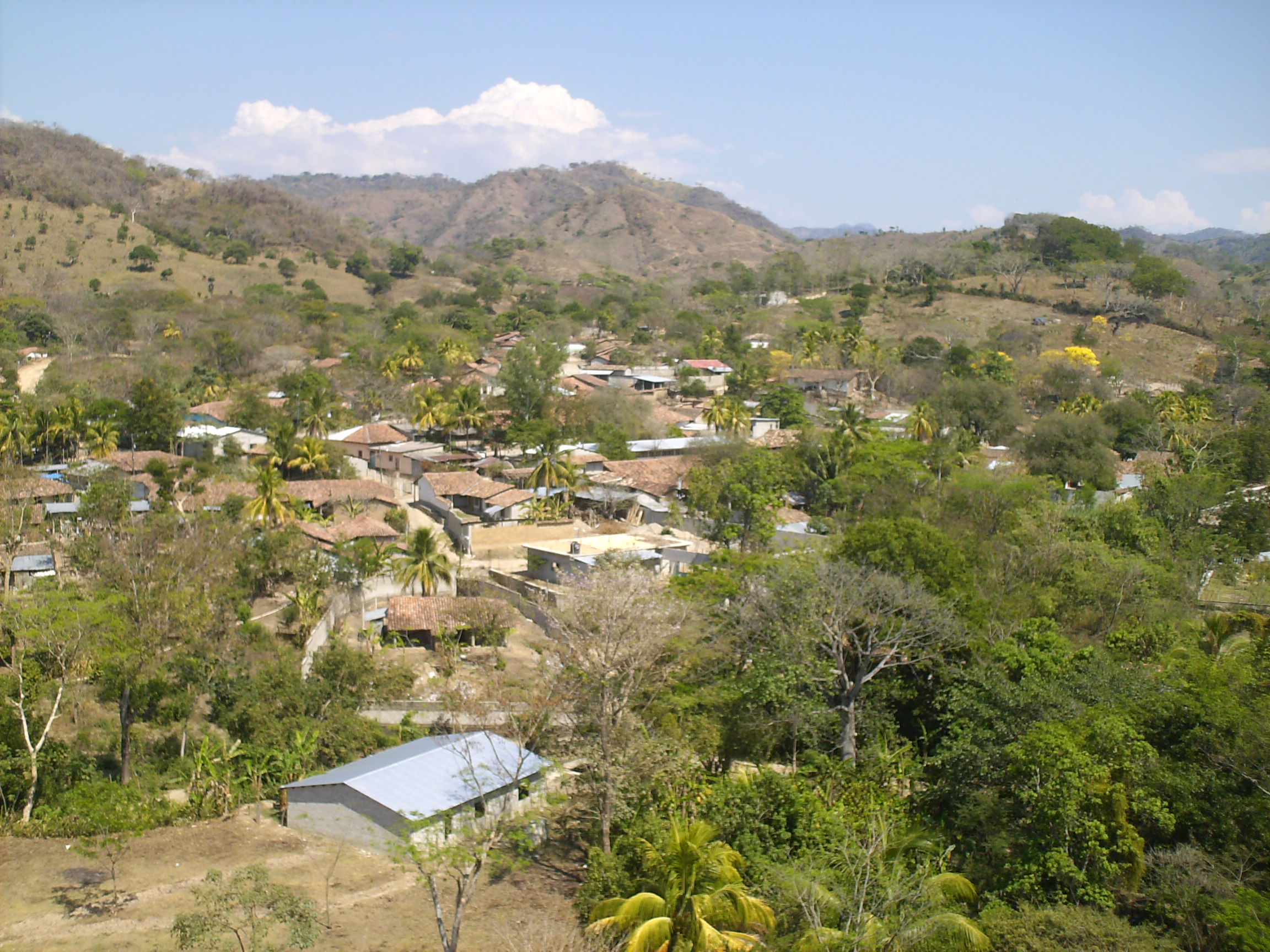
- Panoramic View of Mapulaca

- Location in Honduras
- Coordinates: 14°02′N 88°37′W
- Country: Honduras
- Department: Lempira

Area
  - Total: 32 km^{2} (12 sq mi)

Population (2015)
  - Total: 4,314
  - Density: 130/km^{2} (350/sq mi)

Mapulaca is a municipality in the Honduran department of Lempira.

It is one of the smallest municipalities in the south of Lempira department, accessible via Santa Rosa de Copán-San Marcos de Ocotepeque-Cololaca-Valladolid-La Virtud-Mapulaca or via Santa Cruz-San Andrés-Candelaria, a journey of about 5 to 6 hours. On the border, "El Puente Colgante" (The Hanging Bridge) leads to Sonsonate municipality in El Salvador. There is also a newer bridge called "Puente La Intregracion".

== History ==
Mapulaca was founded on 30 October 1692. In the census of 1791, it was part of "Curato de Cerquin". It has real state titles granted by the "Convent" of Gracias on 10 March 1817. Subscribed by his majesty King Felipe IV. In 1889 it was a municipality of Candelaria district.

== Geography ==
Mapulaca is located at approximately 300 m above sea level, and after coming down "Congolón" mountain. It is surrounded by high hills and by dry subtropical forests. It also has some flat lands for sowing with some settlements.

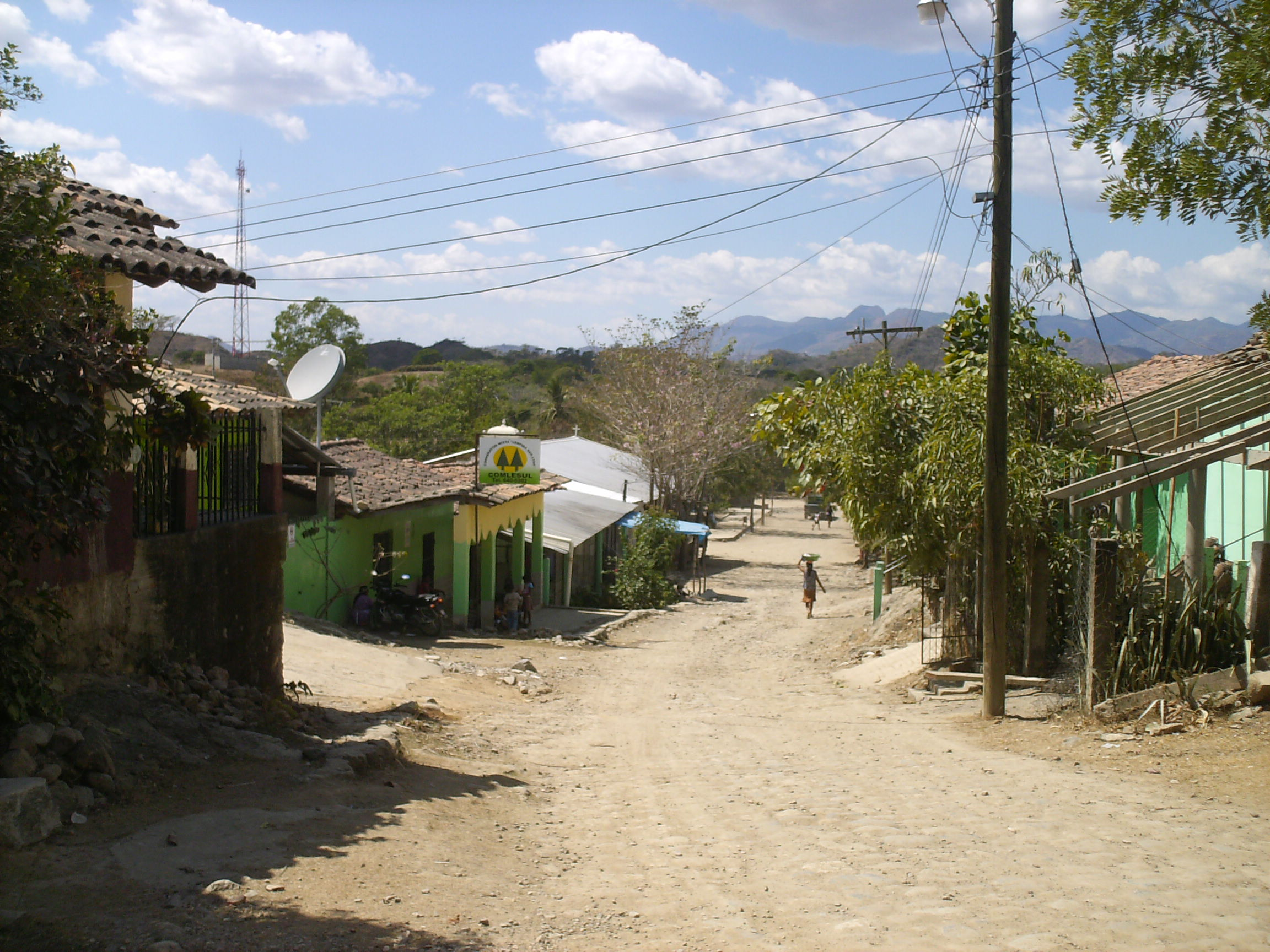
Arriving at Mapulaca

== Boundaries ==
Its boundaries are:

- North: Gualcince municipality.
- South: El Salvador.
- East: Candelaria and Virginia municipalities.
- West: La Virtud municipality.
- Surface area: 32 km^{2}

== Resources ==
The main economic activity is commerce, especially since the border is only 3 km away from the departmental capital. Next is corn and bean crops and on, a smaller scale, cattle and milk products mostly for local consumption. Mapulaca has had electricity and mobile communication services for several years, and water is obtained from wells. It has two hardware stores and several grocery stores. In some houses, people sell gasoline or diesel fuels.

== Population ==
- Villages: 5
- Settlements: 35

=== Demographics ===
At the time of the 2013 Honduras census, Mapulaca municipality had a population of 4,261. Of these, 98.31% were Indigenous (98.26% Lenca), 1.43% Mestizo, 0.14% Black or Afro-Honduran, 0.09% White, and 0.02% others.

== Tourism ==
The Puente Colgante is a hanging bridge that connects to the Chalatenango municipality in El Salvador. It was built by Swiss architect Toni El Suizo, who built more hanging bridges after Hurricane Mitch back in 1998. Tourists swim in the Lempa River, although its currents are strong and dangerous, as well as its tributaries. There are several tributaries to the Lempa, which are also nice places to cool off. There is one hostel in Mapulaca with a restaurant.

- Local Holidays: San Juan de Dios' Day, on 8 March.

== Gallery ==
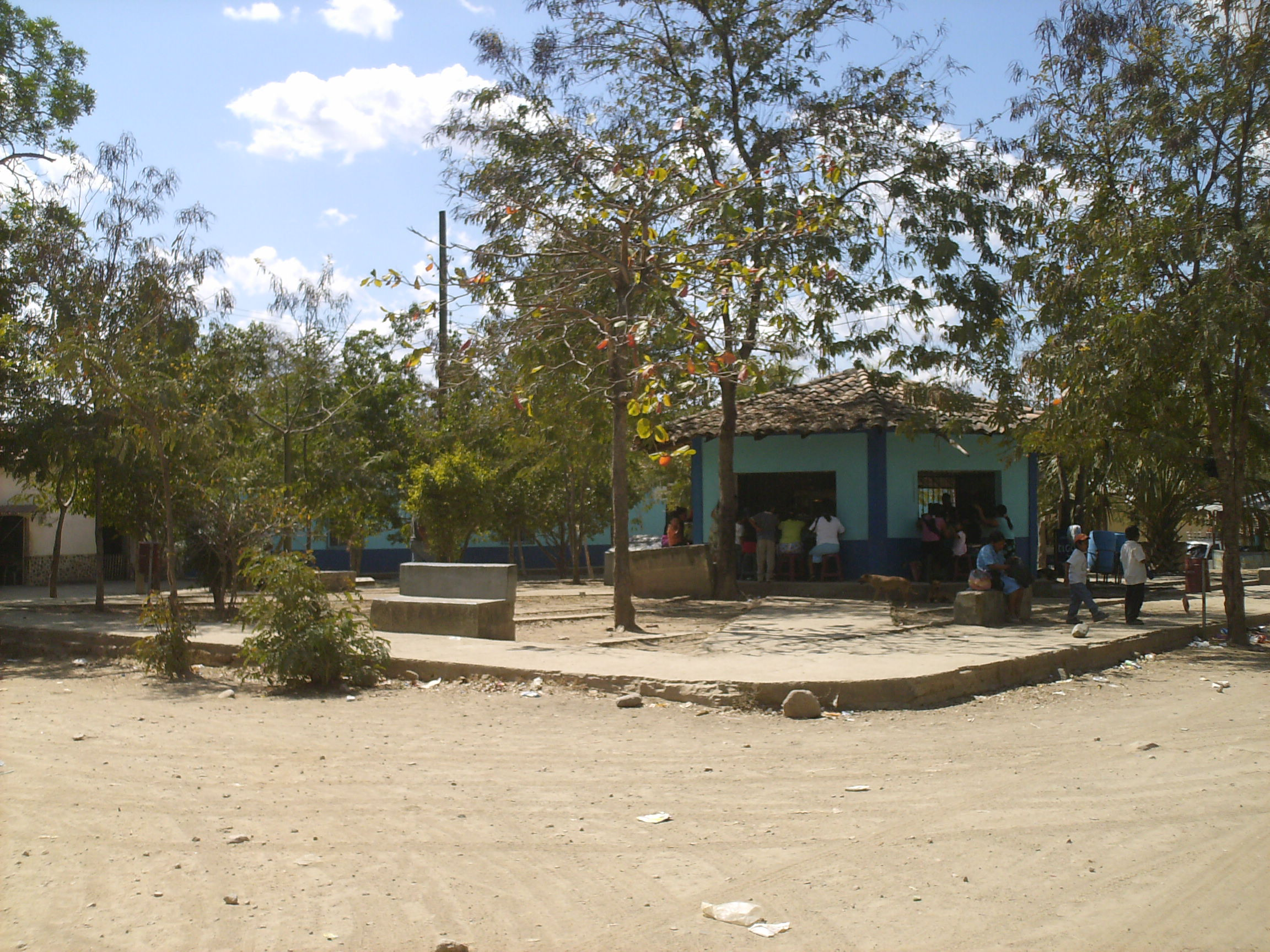
Central Park in Mapulaca

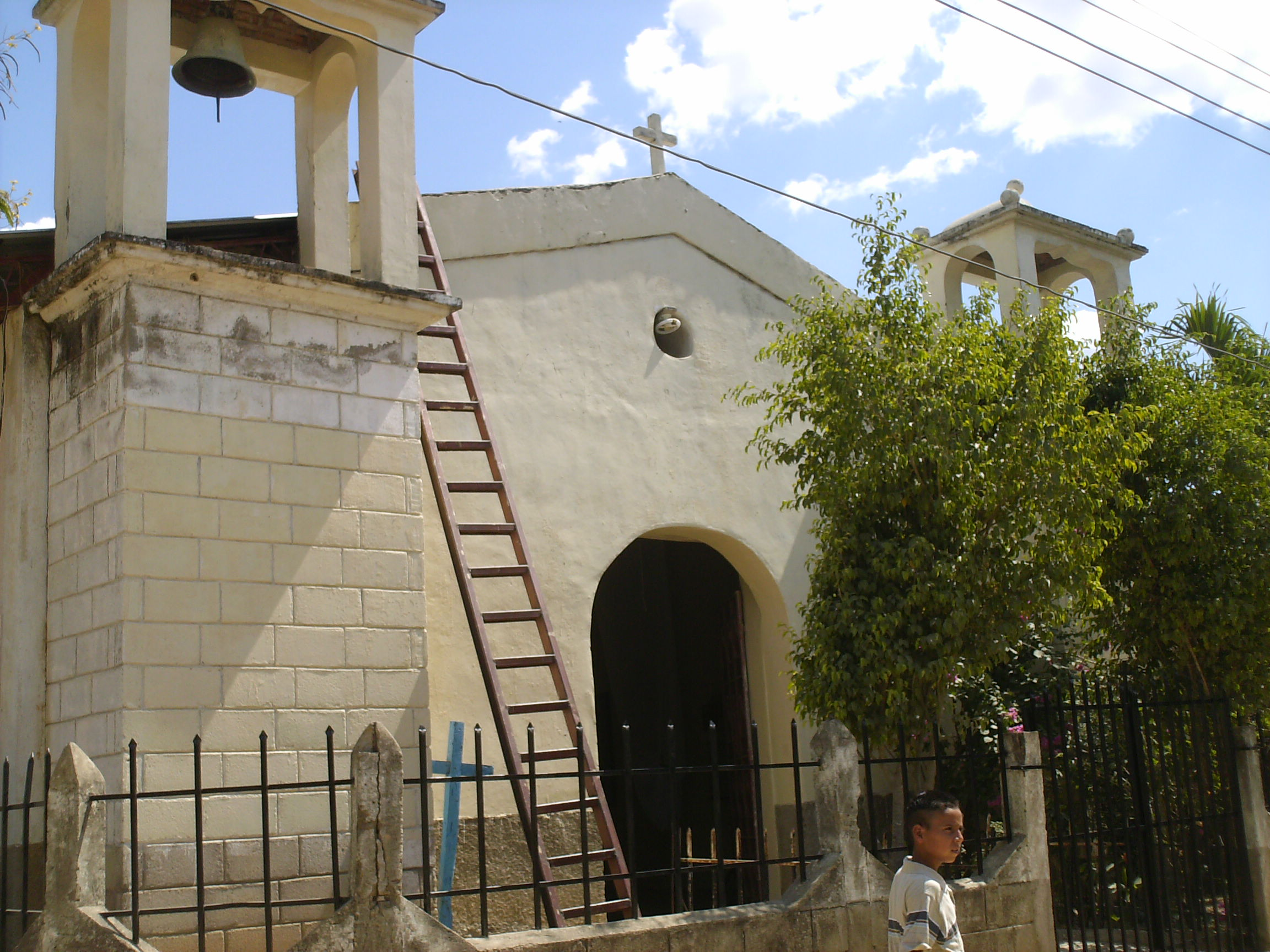
The Small Church in Mapulaca

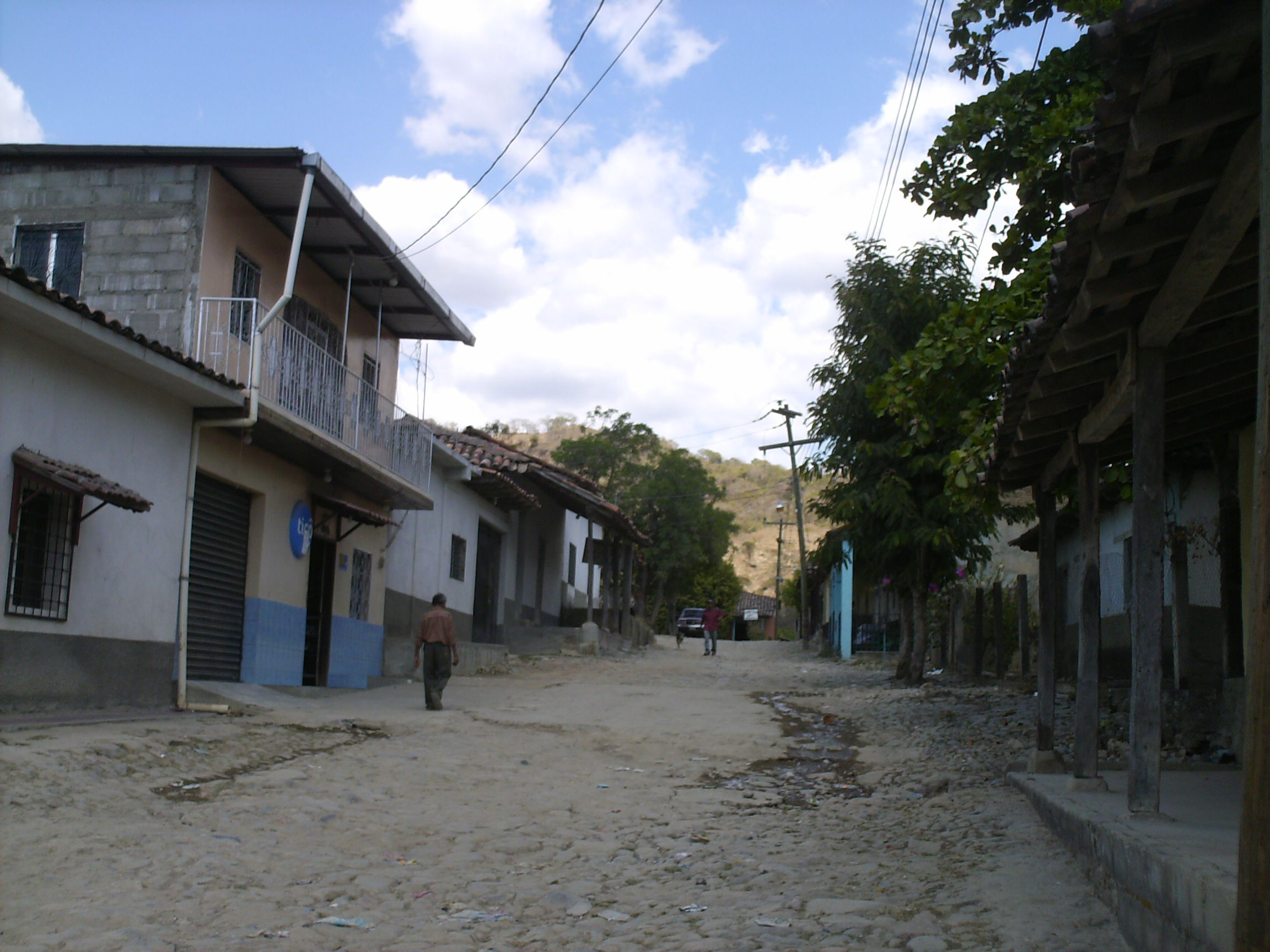
A Street in Mapulaca

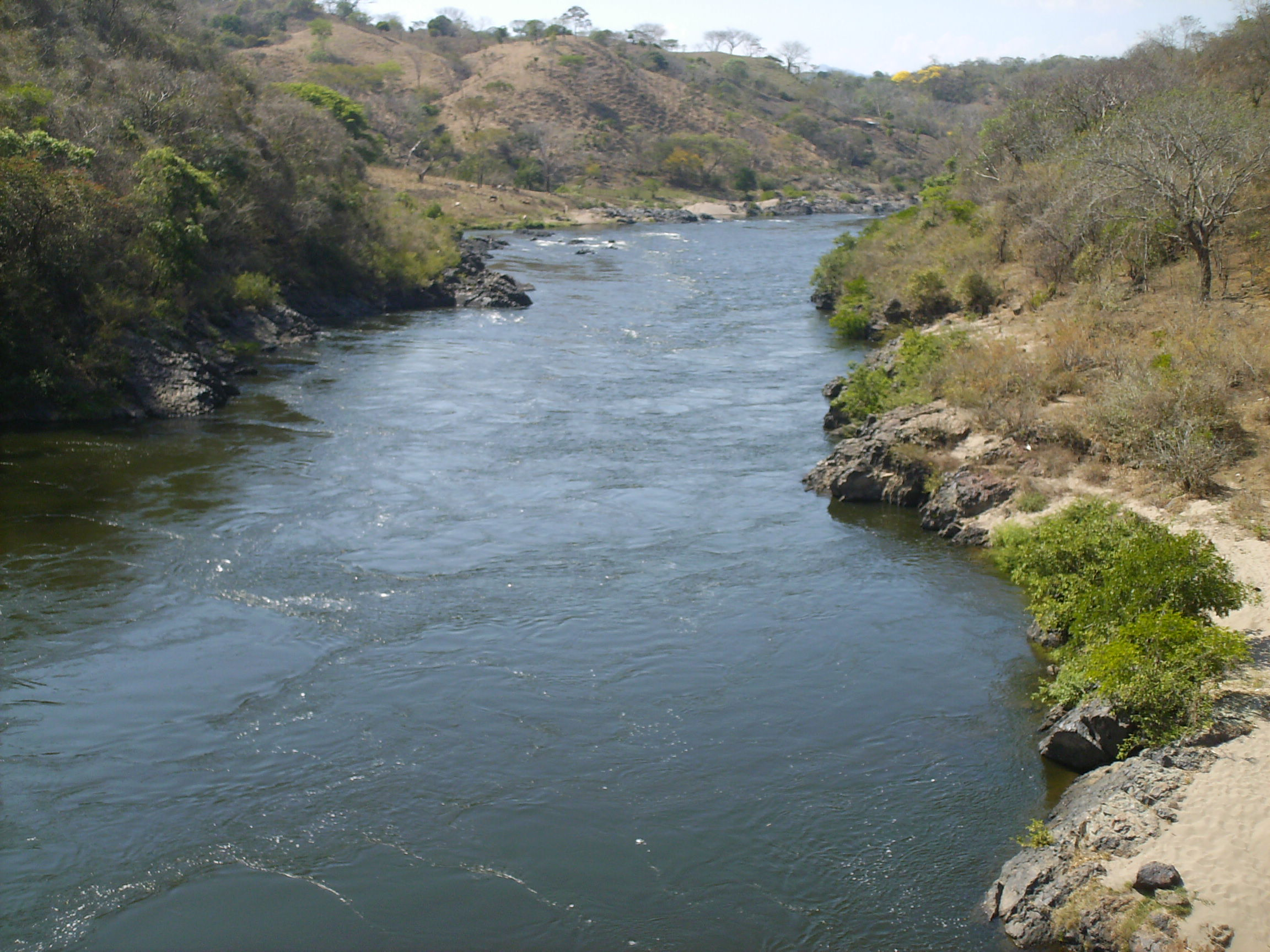
Lempa River on the border, near Mapulaca

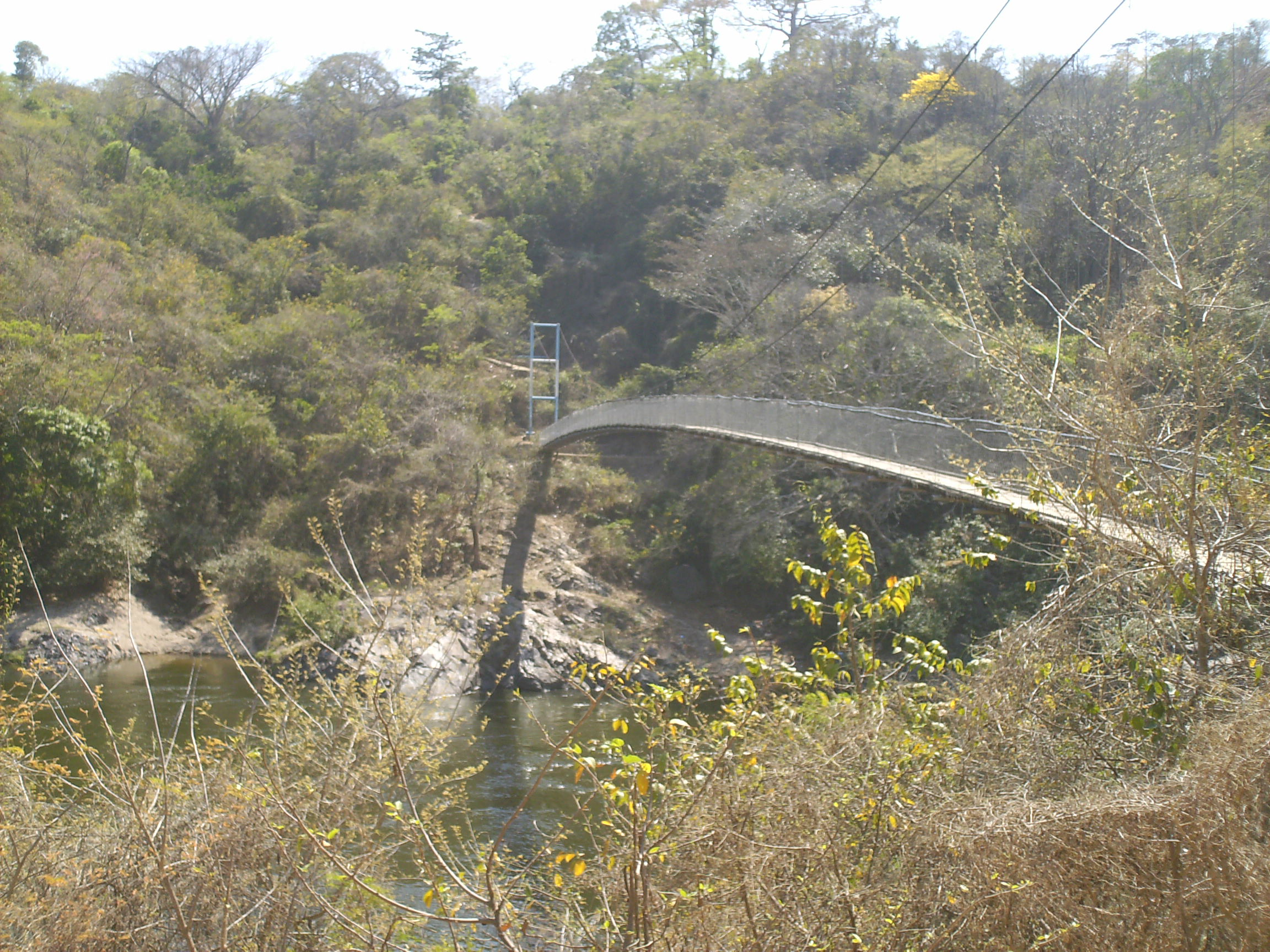
The Hanging bridge to El Salvador

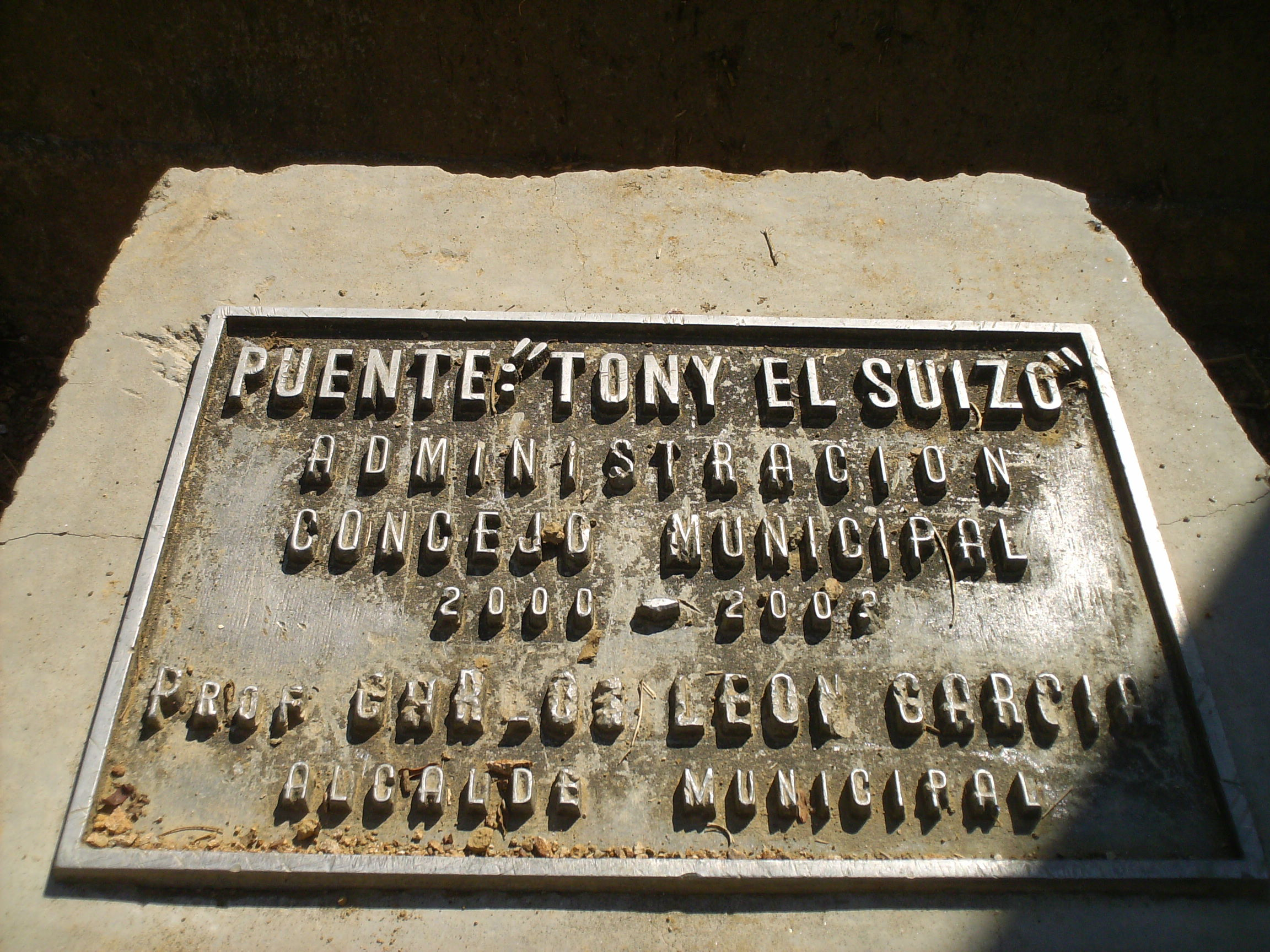
In Honor to the Bridge Maker

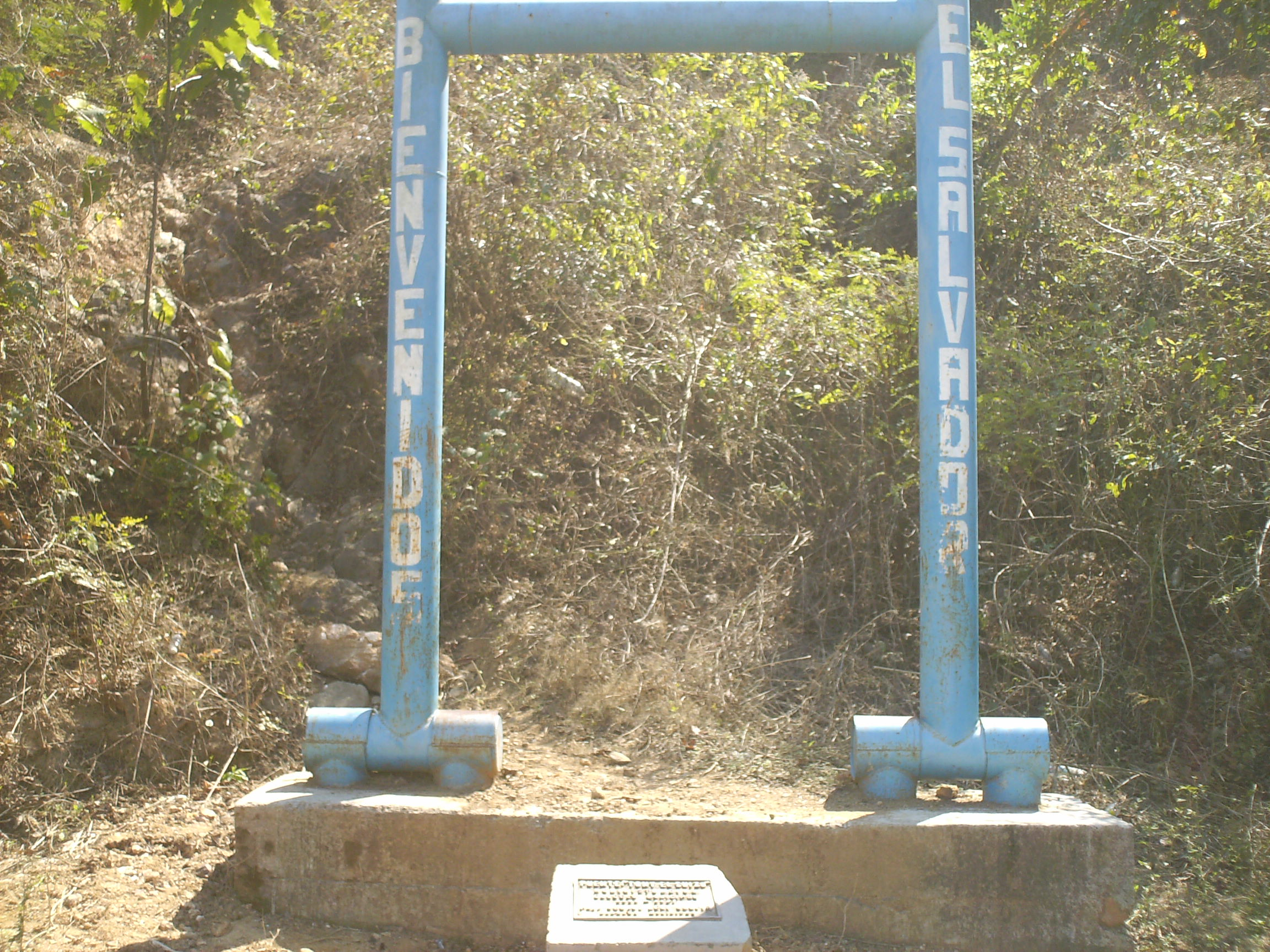
Welcome to El Salvador
