= Nery Geremias Orellana =

- Born: 1985?
- Died: July 14, 2011; San Lorenzo, Honduras
- Occupations: radio station manager and journalist
- Notable credit(s): Radio Joconguera, Radio Progreso

Nery Geremias Orellana (1985 – July 14, 2011) was a Honduran station manager for Radio Joconguera in Candelaria, Lempira, Honduras, a reporter for Radio Progreso and a member of the Community Radio Network. He was murdered July 14, 2011, in San Lorenzo after confirming his attendance at a regional meeting of community radio stations.

According to the Associated Press, it was well known that Orellana was actively involved with political groups that were sympathetic to former President Manuel Zelaya. Orellana, who was active in politics after the 2009 Honduran coup d'état, was one of over 20 Honduran journalists killed since 2007. As of July 29, 2010, at least 8 journalists belonging to the opposition, like Orellana, have been killed, according to Human Rights Watch.

== Career ==
Although Radio Joconguera was primarily a music radio station, Nery Geremias Orellana often covered social issues. He was an active member of the National Popular Resistance Front. He was also a correspondent for Radio Progreso, a Christian-based radio station. He often gave the spokespersons from the Catholic Church airtime on Radio Joconguera.

== Death ==
On the morning of July 14, 2011, Orellano confirmed with Radio Progreso that he would be attending a community radio meeting that was to be held the next day. Minutes later, around 9:30 a.m., he was found shot in the head, by unknown persons, while riding his motorcycle to the meeting. At the time he was found, Orellana was alive and he was transferred from a clinic to a nearby medical facility in El Salvador, where he died around 2 p.m.

His murder has not yet been solved and the motive has not been confirmed. It was reported by Father Jose Amilcar, who is a priest in Candeleria and has worked with Orellana, that the two of them had received death threats in the past based on their reporting of corruption in the country. He also told the Comité por la Libre Expresión, also known as C-Libre Honduras, that Orellana was going to grant the National Popular Resistance Front to airtime the radio.

== Context ==
In 2009, the Honduras military overthrew President Manuel Zelaya as a result of a constitutional crisis. Although Zelaya had been democratically elected, the country's Supreme Court ordered the military to take control on the basis that the court had ruled against Zelaya, who was attempting to change the Constitution. Zelaya was exiled to Costa Rica. In response to the coup d'état, the National Popular Resistance Front was formed to protest the situation. Riots broke out in Honduras and the country has been in upheaval ever since. Diplomatic efforts across the Western Hemisphere have been trying to bring the parties in the country to accept a democratic solution.

According to the Committee to Protect Journalists and the Inter-American Commission on Human Rights, 12 Honduran journalists have been killed since the coup, with at least three of them being in direct connection with their work. Reporters Without Borders reports similar findings.

The IACHR also said that radio stations have been harassed in Honduras for reporting on human rights abuses.

== Reactions ==
As a direct result of Orellana's murder, some of the radio stations in Honduras co-signed a statement that they would pledge to continue making radio more democratic and serve the people in Orellana's memory.

Reactions to Orellana's murder have been given by various people and organizations:

Irina Bokova, the director-general of UNESCO, said: "I condemn the murder of Nery Jeremias Orellana and Adan Benitez. The killing of journalists constitutes a crime against society as a whole. Democracy and rule of law require a free and independent press to nourish informed debate. I call on the authorities to conduct a thorough investigation of these crimes to ensure that everyone in the country is free to exercise their fundamental human right of freedom of expression without fearing for their lives."

Robert Mahoney, who is the deputy director of the CPJ, said: "Since the coup, an alarmingly high number of journalists have been killed in Honduras but few perpetrators have been brought to justice. Authorities must investigate the murder of Nery Geremias Orellana examine all possible motives, including his journalism. It is time for them to bring an end to the record level of violence against the press in Honduras."

A statement from Reporters Without Borders said: "Honduras’ recent readmission to the Organization of American States, has not in any way addressed the problems created by the June 2009 coup d’état or the resulting challenges that the country still faces – the need to restore the rule of law and establish real pluralism. The international community must not forget these demands."
