= Virginia, Honduras =

Virginia
- Municipality
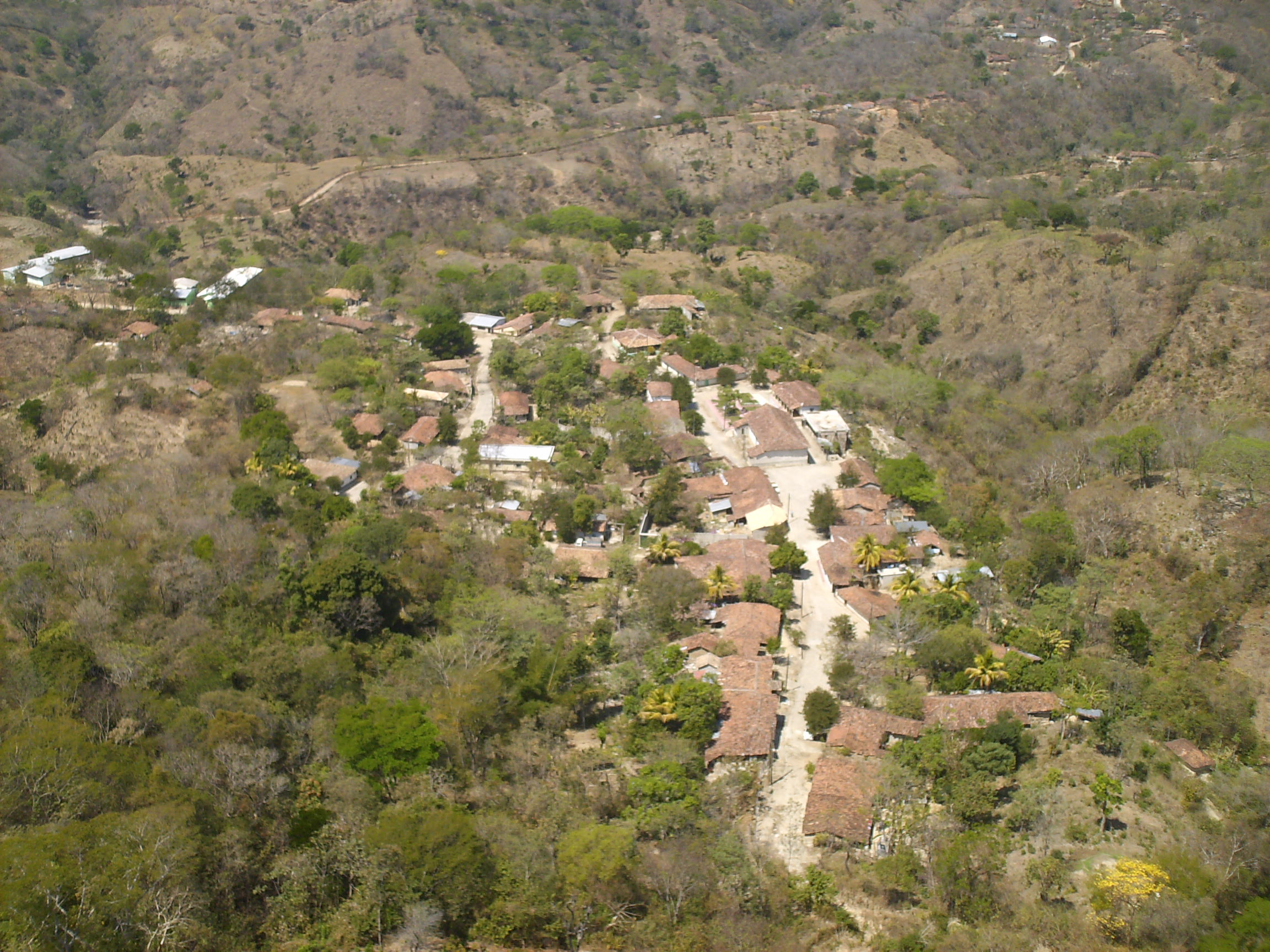
- A panoramic view of the whole town

- Location in Honduras
- Coordinates: 14°1′N 88°34′W
- Country: Honduras
- Department: Lempira
- Villages: 5

Area
  - Total: 36 km^{2} (14 sq mi)

Population (2015)
  - Total: 2,574
  - Density: 72/km^{2} (190/sq mi)

Virginia (Spanish pronunciation: [biɾˈxinja]) is a municipality in the Honduran department of Lempira. Virginia is located in Lempira Honduras and shares a border with El Salvador. Many Virginians travel to El Salvador to do their shopping, because the Honduran cities are far away from Virginia.

It is one of the smallest municipalities of the Lempira department. It is 15 km or 30 minutes away from Mapulaca if accessed through Gracias.

== History ==
It was founded back in 1830. In the national division of 1889 it was one municipality of Candelaria.

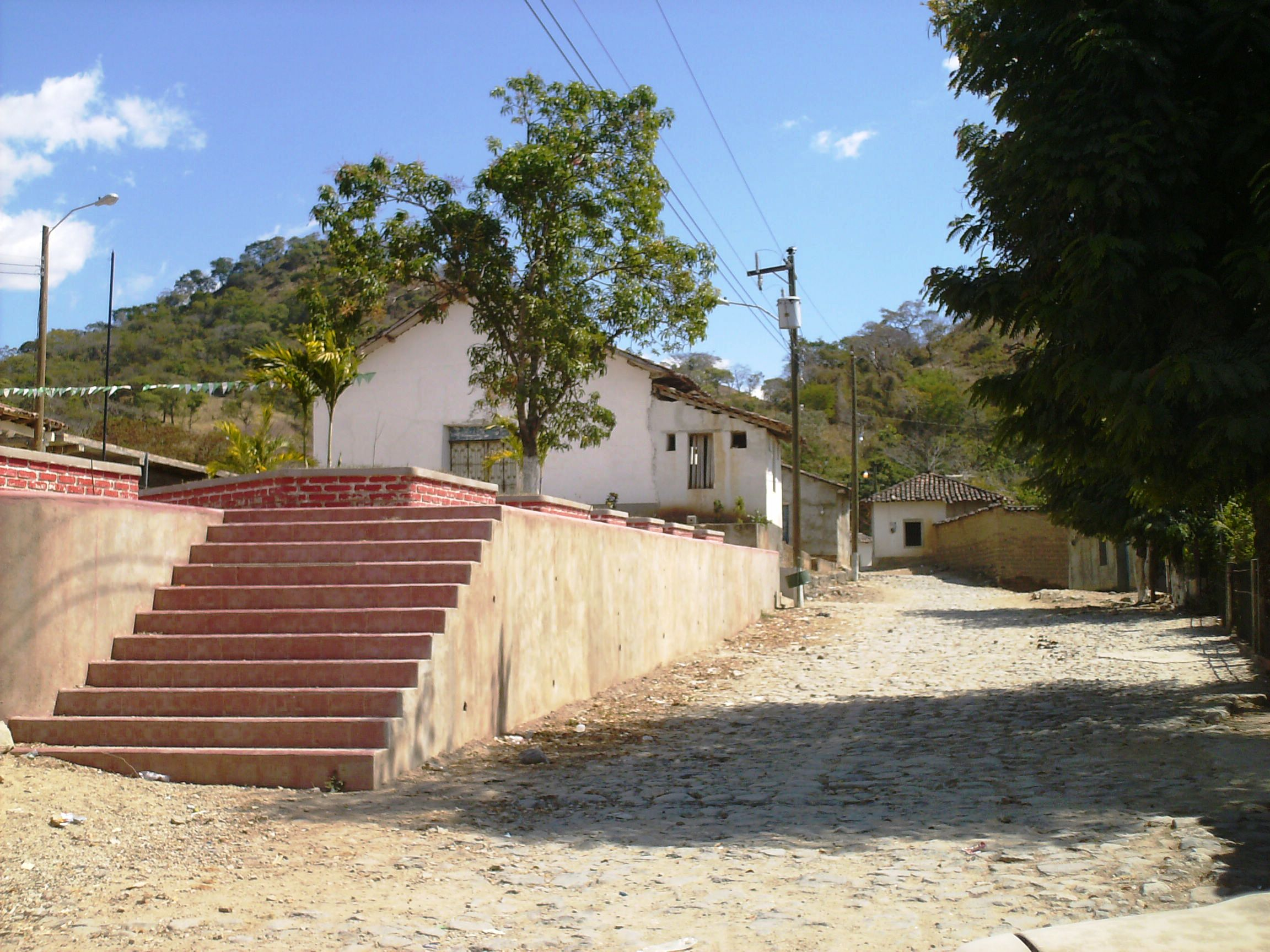
Central Park and Church

== Geography ==
It is situated in a semi flat place and surrounded by many hills. The predominant vegetation corresponds to the sub tropical dry forest. In the municipality capital there are some inclined streets.

== Boundaries ==
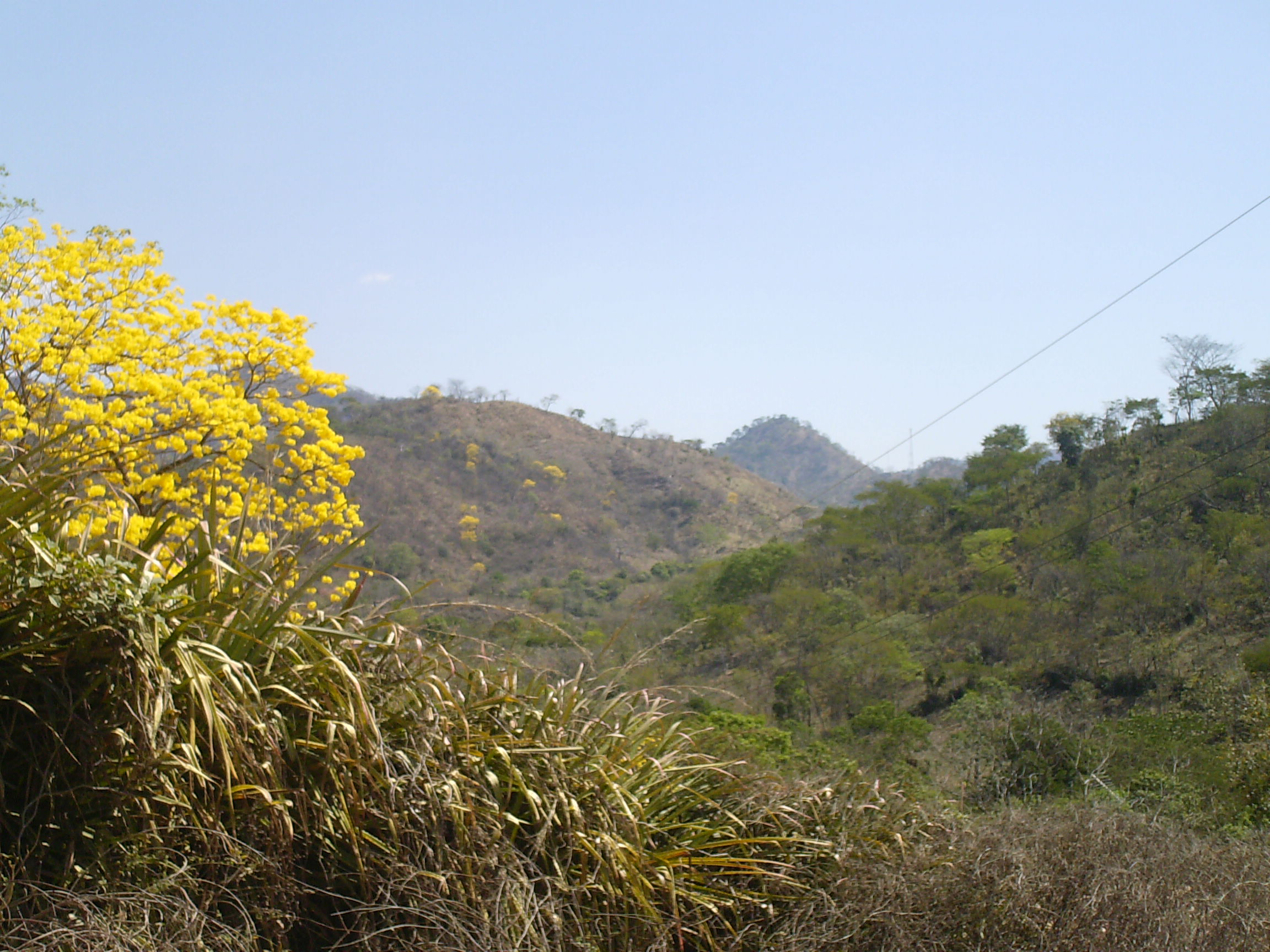
A common landscape of Virginia hills in summer time

Its boundaries are:

- North : Candelaria municipality.
- South : El Salvador.
- East : Piraera municipality.
- West : Mapulaca municipality.
- Surface Extents: 36 km^{2}

== Resources ==
Since it is on the border with El Salvador, it is much easier for people to go there to establish commercial activities. Also there are more and better jobs on the other side of the border, with the advantage of receiving their wages in US dollars. It is not an ideal location for coffee plantations, therefore corn and beans crops became important (even though they are for local consumption); followed by cattle raising. Like the rest of the department, it has electricity and mobile communication services.

== Population ==
- Population: The amount of inhabitants was 2,734 and according to INE Honduras estimates, there will be 2,574 in 2015.
- Villages: 5
- Settlements: 35

=== Demographics ===
At the time of the 2013 Honduras census, Virginia municipality had a population of 2,548. Of these, 97.06% were Mestizo, 2.90% Indigenous (2.86% Lenca) and 0.04% Black or Afro-Honduran.

== Tourism ==
As for the remaining 15 km, although this dirt road is not maintained properly, the drive is uncomplicated. A half-hour visit is deemed enough to see all there is to see in the municipality capital. For those who are interested in rural and quiet towns, this is a good place to visit. Notably, the mobile phone signal from El Salvador is stronger than the Honduran signal. Because it is near the Lempa River, the local pastime is going there to bathe. The local holidays and festivals attract many visitors.

- Local Holidays: "Santa Lucia" day on December 13.
