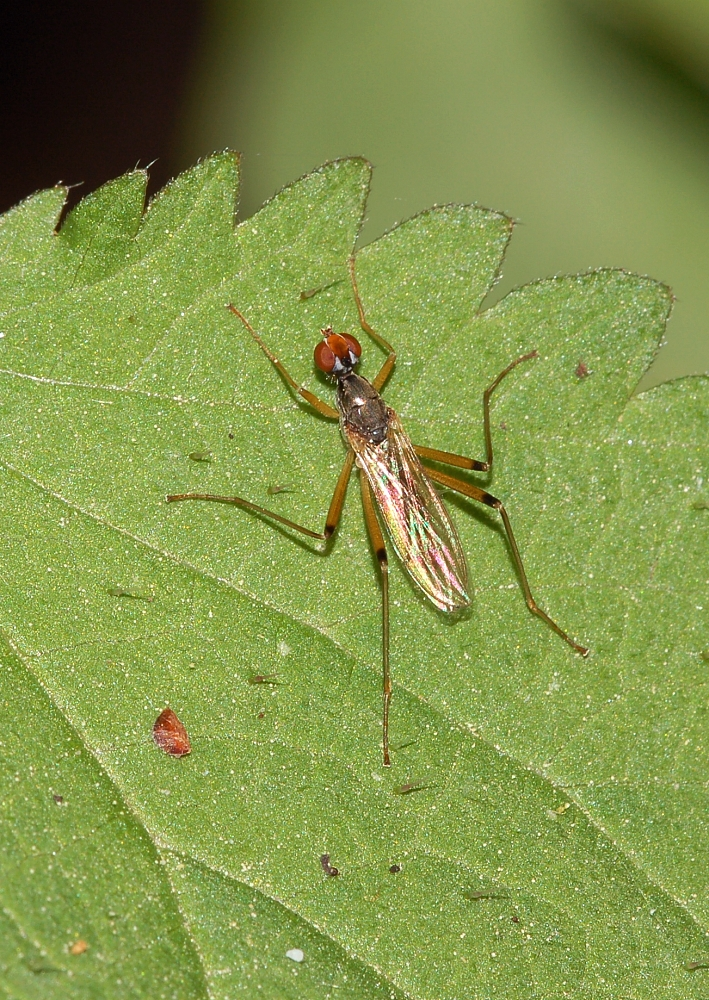
- Compsobata nigricornis

Scientific classification
- Domain: Eukaryota
- Kingdom: Animalia
- Phylum: Arthropoda
- Class: Insecta
- Order: Diptera
- Family: Micropezidae
- Subfamily: Calobatinae
- Genus: Compsobata; Czerny, 1930

= Compsobata =

Genus of flies

Compsobata is a genus of stilt-legged flies in the family Micropezidae. There are at least 20 described species in Compsobata.

== Species ==
These 20 species belong to the genus Compsobata:

- Compsobata borealis Ozerov, 1987^{c g}
- Compsobata caucasica Ozerov, 1990^{c g}
- Compsobata cibaria (Linnaeus, 1758)^{c g}
- Compsobata columbiana Merritt, 1976^{i c g}
- Compsobata dentigera (Loew, 1854)^{c g}
- Compsobata femoralis (Meigen, 1826)^{c g}
- Compsobata jamesi Merritt, 1971^{i c g}
- Compsobata japonica (Hennig, 1938)^{c g}
- Compsobata kennicotti (Banks, 1926)^{i c g}
- Compsobata microfulcrum (James, 1946)^{i c g}
- Compsobata mima (Hennig, 1936)^{i c g b}
- Compsobata nigricornis (Zetterstedt, 1838)^{c g}
- Compsobata nitens (Loew, 1870)^{c g}
- Compsobata nitidicollis (Frey, 1947)^{c g}
- Compsobata orientalis Ozerov, 1987^{c g}
- Compsobata pallipes (Say, 1823)^{i c g}
- Compsobata sachalinensis (Hennig, 1938)^{c g}
- Compsobata schumanni Soos, 1975^{c g}
- Compsobata silvicola Ozerov, 1987^{c g}
- Compsobata univitta (Walker, 1849)^{i c g b}

Data sources: i = ITIS, c = Catalogue of Life, g = GBIF, b = Bugguide.net
