= Candelaria, Honduras =

Candelaria
- Municipality
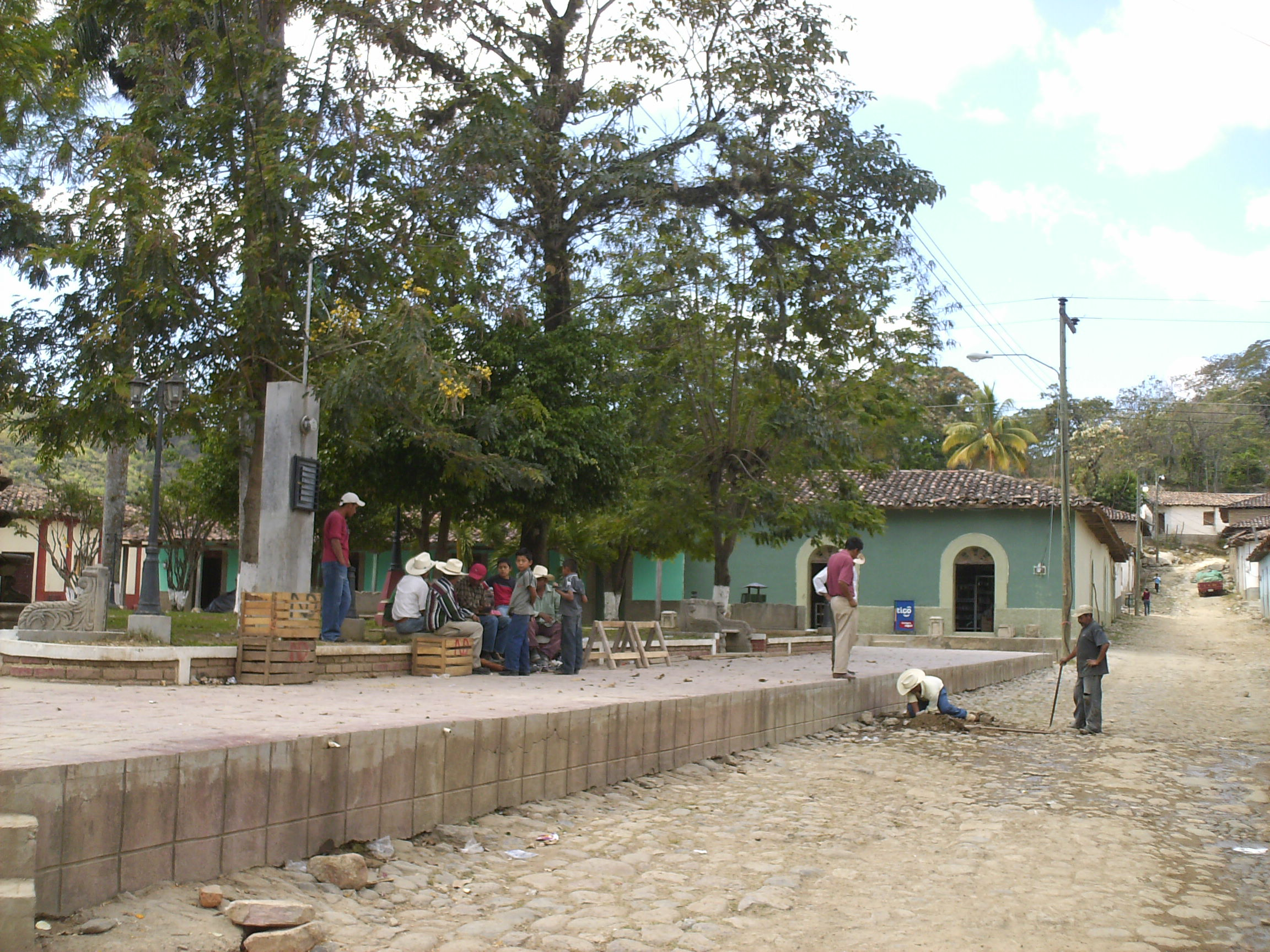
- Downtown Candelaria

- Location in Honduras
- Coordinates: 14°05′N 88°34′W
- Country: Honduras
- Department: Lempira
- Village since: 1872
- Municipality since: 20 February 1897; 129 years ago

Area
  - Total: 60 km^{2} (23 sq mi)

Population (2015)
  - Total: 6,858
  - Density: 110/km^{2} (300/sq mi)

Candelaria is a municipality in the Honduran department of Lempira.

Candelaria is one of the municipalities of the Lempira department. It is located 96 km away from Gracias city, and passing by San Juan del Caite (Intibuca). In terms of time, that is about 3.5 hours of driving on an unpaved road, going up and down through mountains, one of them is "Congolón" where the hero Lempira fought the Spanish conquerors.

== History ==
Its origins go back to 3 August 1607, with the name of "San Francisco de Joconguera" and under statement No 5. It became a village in 1872 and on 20 February 1897 it was given the title of municipality under the administration of president Policarpo Bonilla as "Candelaria de Joconguera". It became a city on 22 February 1939, after Antiguo de la Rañírez led a revolution to liberate the Candelarian people.

== Geography ==
When arriving at Candelaria the Pine forests are no longer around, this makes the weather warmer, caused by the change in elevation above sea level. It was settled in a despression surrounded by steep hills, some of them even craggy. There are some small streams which are helpful for water supply.

== Boundaries ==
Its boundaries are:

- North : Gualcince municipality
- South : Virginia municipality
- East : Piraera municipality
- West : Mapulaca and Gualcince municipalities

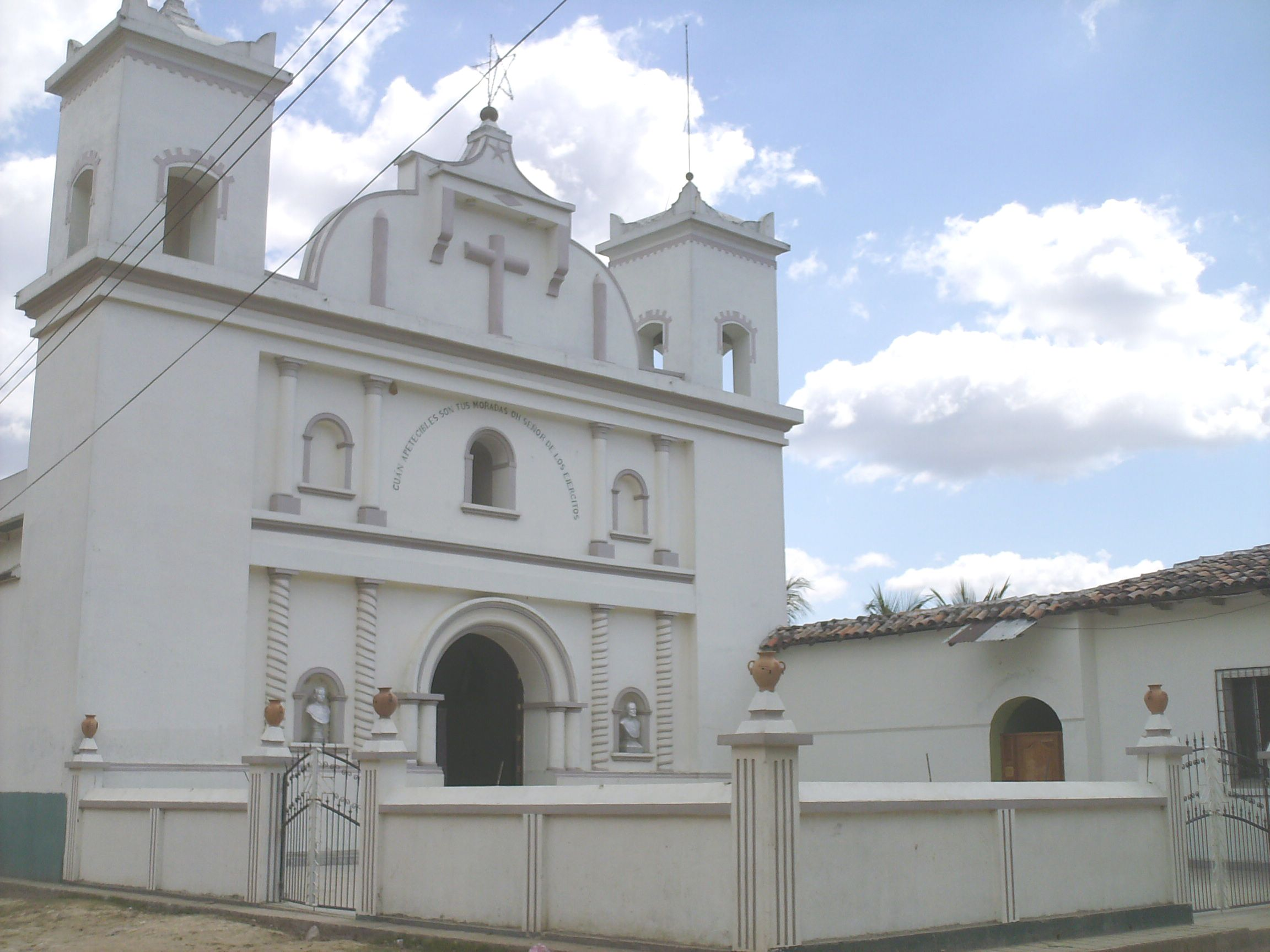
Old Colonial Church

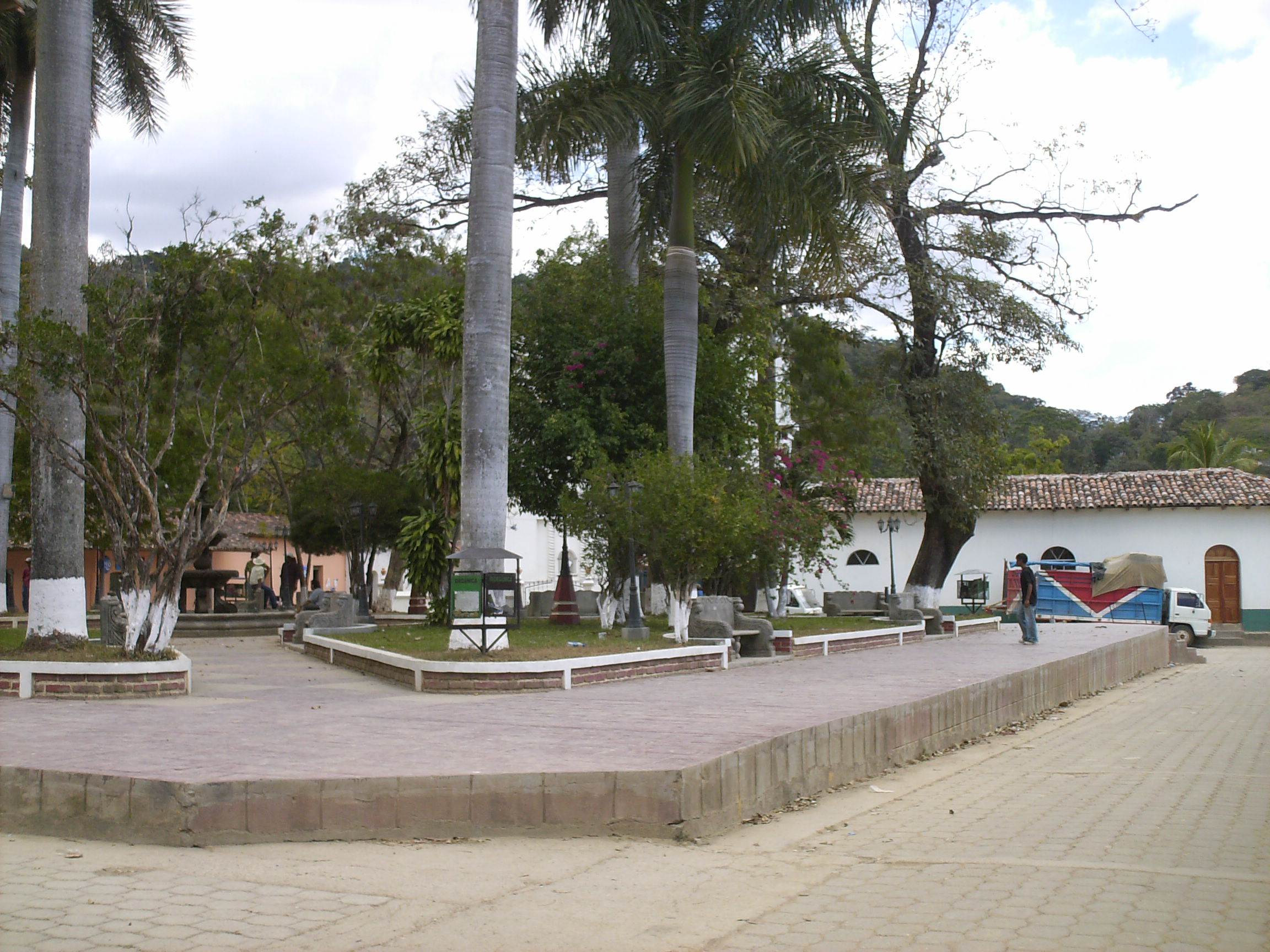
Central Park in Downtown Candelaria

- Surface Extents: 52 km²

== Resources ==
The elevation and soil do not allow for coffee plantations, but the processes of peeling, drying and toasting of coffee grains are done. Corn and bean crops are very important. Commerce activities are very popular since the main road leads to the border with El Salvador, and the US dollar can be used as currency as well. The centre of the city and the nearest villages have electricity. The water supply is obtained from wells and some streams. There is one local organisation and its function is to improve the production of local products.

== Population ==
The typical cross-breed of native Indians and Spanish settlers is seen in Candelaria, but also are seen individuals with features of each race separately.

- Population: The figure was 6,141, in 2001. This was used to elaborate an estimate by the INE Honduras (NSI National Statistics Institute), so in 2008 the population might be 6,746.
- Villages: 5
- Settlements: 48

=== Demographics ===
At the time of the 2013 Honduras census, Candelaria municipality had a population of 6,772. Of these, 59.05% were Indigenous, 34.25% Mestizo, 6.26% Black or Afro-Honduran, 0.41% White and 0.01% others.

== Tourism ==
Candelaria is very quaint and attracts tourists due to the colonial details of its houses and buildings. There are 2 hostels with good facilities.

- Local Holidays: "Virgen de la Candelaria" on 1 February through 8th.

== Gallery ==
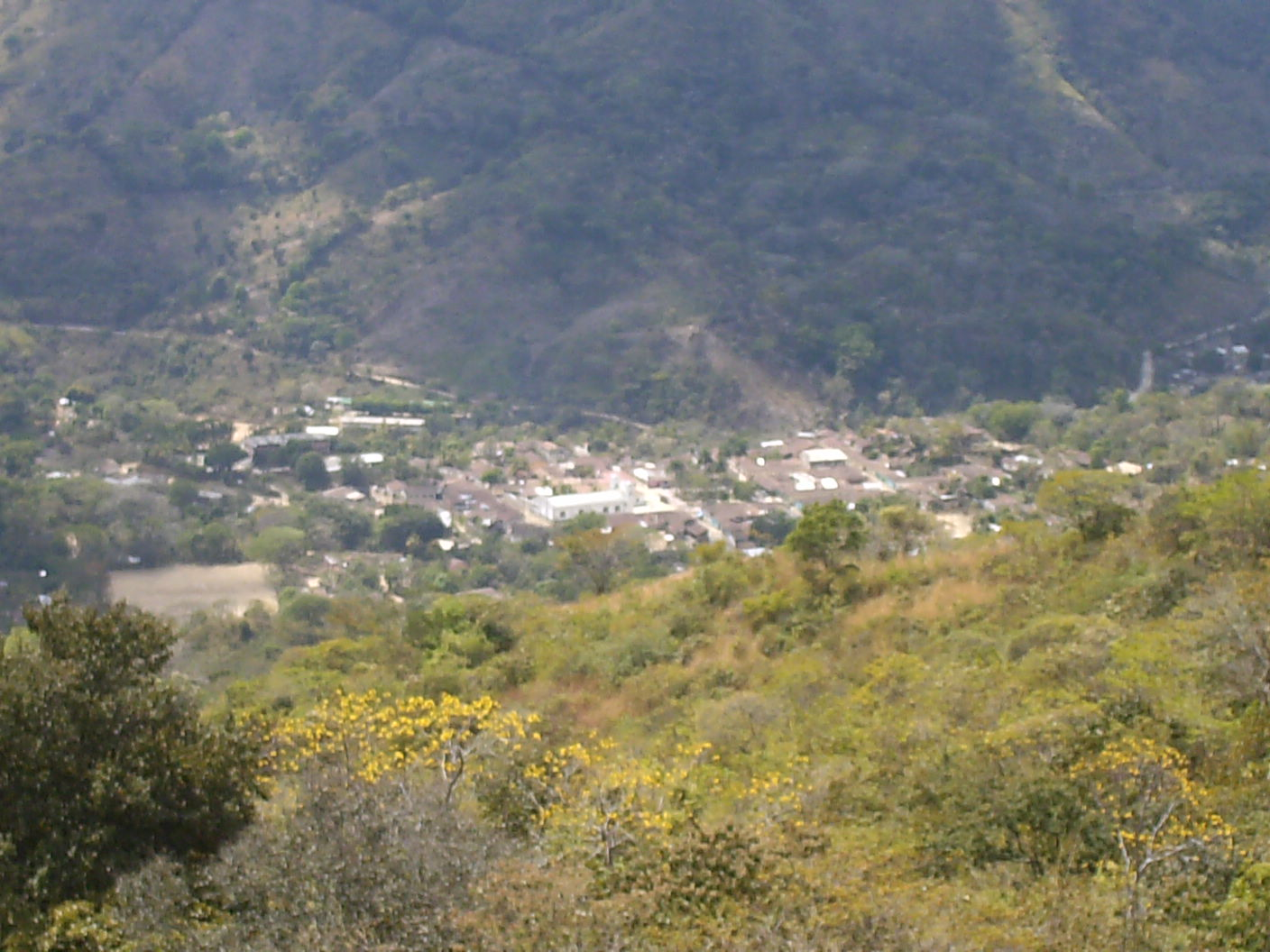
Panoramic View of Candelaria

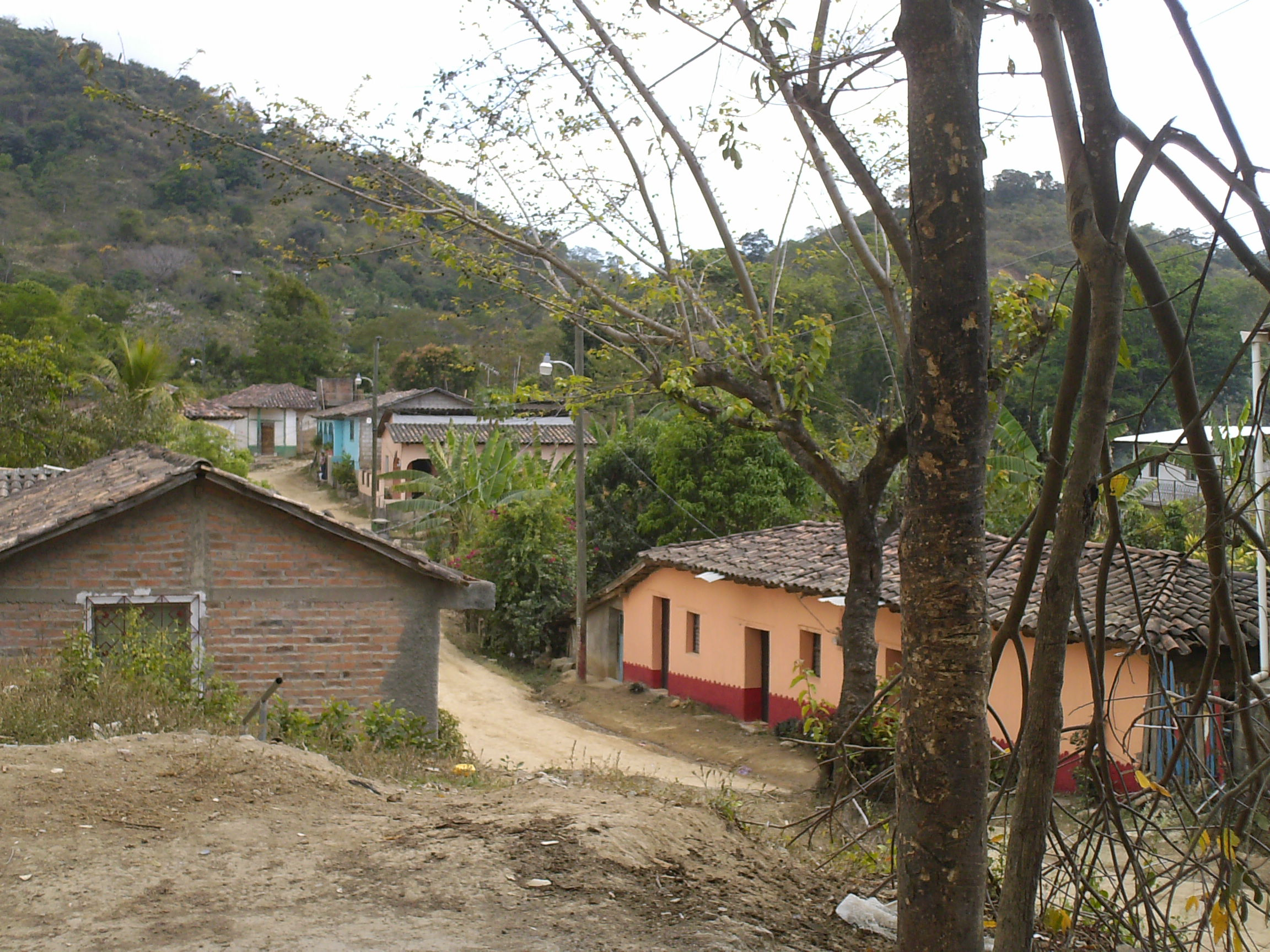
A Street from Candelaria

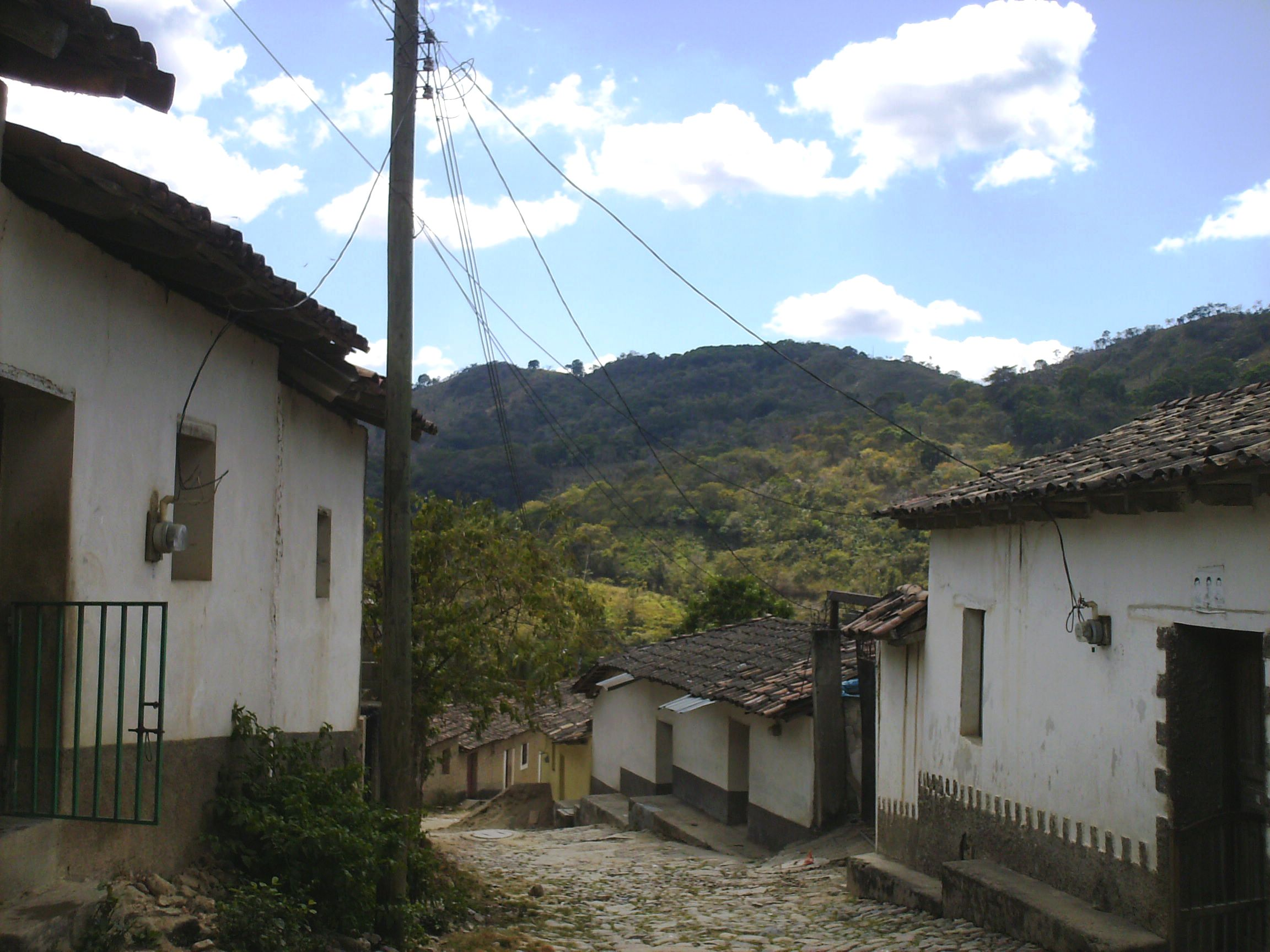
A Street in Candelaria

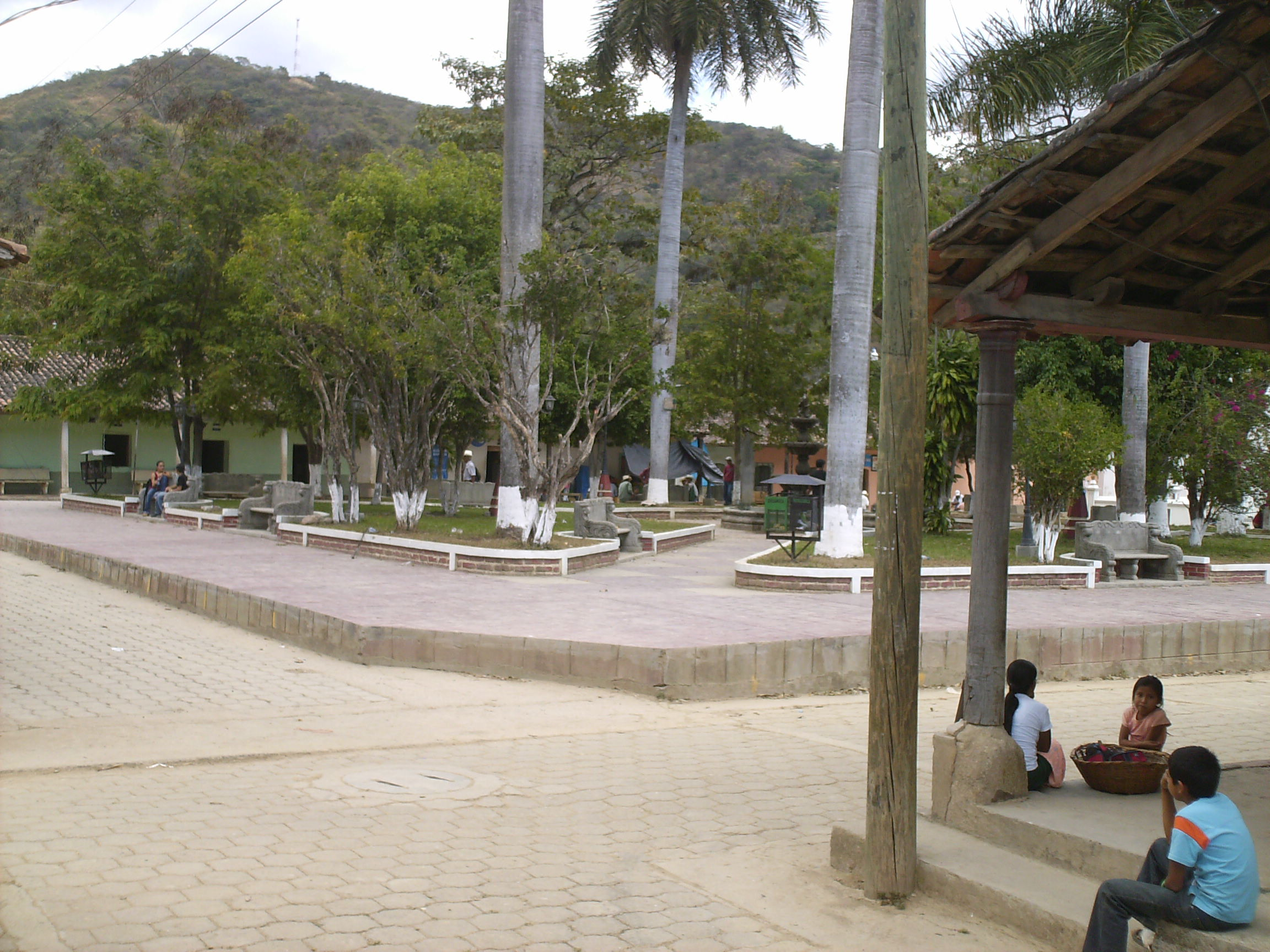
A Street in Candelaria
