= Nery Cano =

Guatemalan conductor and trumpet player (1956–2021)

Nery Evelio Cano Arreaga (Chiantla, Huehuetenango, May 26, 1956 - Guatemala City, July 29, 2021) was a Guatemalan conductor, composer and arranger. He was a well known trumpet player in Guatemala.

He was conductor in chief of the Symphonic Martial Band for 20 years of Military Services of Ministry of Defense and also a trumpeter. Recognized in the Dictionary of Music of Guatemala of the University of San Carlos, he was a promoter of Jazz in Guatemala. He was a coordinator of several college education projects for the university career of Bachelor of Music in his country.

== Biography ==
As a child, Nery showed a disposition and interest in learning to play different instruments. He was the youngest of nine children of the couple, Evelio Cano Mérida and Adelina Natividad Arreaga Argueta. Both parents cultivated in their children the love of music. The seven brothers and two sisters used to participate and promote artistic events in Chiantla, their home town. Later, Nery moved to Guatemala city to enter Military Music School at only 14 years of age, where he graduated with honors as a Military Musician at 18 years. Later he graduated as Teacher of Musical Education in the Normal School for Teachers of Music, "Jesús María Alvarado" and received the diploma of Specialization in Trumpet. At first, he was inclined to be a trumpet player and accordionist, and he played as trumpet player in the Symphony Martial Band of Guatemala.

In 1980, he married Bilsania Villatoro, and they had three daughters.

== Professional life ==
With his brothers, Nery founded the Banda Canoa (from their surnames Cano Arreaga), which had a significant success in the late seventies and eighties, playing covers of bands like Chicago, The Manhattan Transfer, Led Zeppelin and Queen, among others. From the beginning, Nery was the director of the Canoa Band. His work in the band and his performances on the trumpet, led him to opt for the position of trumpet player in the National Symphony Orchestra of Guatemala.

In the eighties, he participated in Musical Theater production "This is Broadway!" as both director and arranger of the staging.

In 1991, he returned to the Martial Band when he won the tryouts for the General Directorate of the Centennial Symphony Martial Band, of which he served as the conductor and director for 20 years. As a result of his efforts, this Symphony Band achieved the declaration by the Government as "Cultural Heritage of the Nation" in 1995. At the same time, Nery Cano founded his own Big Jazz Band and the Primavera Chamber Orchestra.

In the late nineties, he moved to the city of Miami, Florida, where he was an arranger and trumpet soloist for the Ocean Sound Band on Miami Beach's Oceanside Street.

Later he returned to Guatemala and merged his work as conductor of the Martial Symphony Band, producing jazz, chamber music and pop opera events. With his nephew, the pop opera singer Maximo Marcuso, a tenor in the California area, they offered together several events in Guatemala. Maestro Cano participated in various festivals and cultural events within the university environment, including exchanges with representatives of some universities such as Berklee College of Music, University of Oklahoma and Autonomous University of Chiapas. He was invited to be an orchestra conductor and trumpeter to Mexico, Chile and Argentina.

In 1991, with the purpose of promoting the marimba, a Guatemalan national instrument, he created and produced a new show, "Maderas y Metales" (Wood and Metals), thus promoting the first Symphonic Ensembles in history, incorporating ten marimba ensembles (9 members per group) to the symphonic concept, filling the stage with about 200 musicians at the same time. He began a series of presentations with the Martial Symphony Band and later, with the National Symphony Orchestra. Ensembles with Marimba and Symphony music under the conducting of maestro Nery Cano were still presented with various directors as a tradition. In 2019, this Ensemble "Maderas y Metales" by Maestro Nery Cano was performed jointly with the Embassy of Japan.

Commissioned by the Presidency of the Republic, between 1994 and 1996, he produced a series of concerts for the Peace of Guatemala which culminated with the 1812 Overture by Tchaikovsky, accompanied by special effects, pyrotechnics and royal artillery salvoes.

On many occasions Nery Cano was a guest conductor of the National Symphony Orchestra of Guatemala. He was also a guest conductor of several Central American chamber and philharmonic orchestras. He participated as the main music director in the documentary "The force of work" produced by a Guatemalan bank.

He was a member of the Bob Porter Orchestra and Millennium Orchestra. He also participated as a producer of jazz and rock shows with the Latin rock band Alux Nahual in 2015.

=== Accordionist ===
Another musical passion was the accordion and as a member and president of the Guatemalan Accordion Club, he organized events in which dozens of accordionists played in unison, performing national and international music, especially Argentine tangos. People still remember their presentation in the Big Hall of the Miguel Angel Asturias Cultural Center conducted by Nery Cano.

=== Academics ===
- He was a trumpet teacher at the University of San Carlos de Guatemala and coordinator of the Bachelor of Music. Planner of the Dictionary of Musical Rhythms, Forms and Genres of the Superior School of Arts of University of San Carlos de Guatemala.
- He was a teacher and collaborator at the Da Vinci University of Guatemala and member of the Department of Performing Arts at the Francisco Marroquín University.
- At the invitation of Doctor Eduardo Suger, rector of the Galileo University, he served as an honorary member of the academic council in the formation of the pensum for the creation of the Bachelor of Music track at this university.
- He taught in various educational establishments, as well as in the National Conservatory of Music, the Normal School for Teachers of Musical Education, Normal Institute for Teachers of Musical Education "Alfredo Colom" and others in which he founded and promoted the organization of orchestras, school bands and musical groups.
- Serving as Conductor and Chief of the Symphonic Martial Band, coordinated the creation of the First Guatemalan Digital Catalogue of Music for Digital Systems.

== Awards and recognition ==
- Decorated with a gold medal "Rafael Alvarez Ovalle," as the highest honor and best graduate in the Military School of Music. Guatemala. 1974.
- Honored as the Grand Marshal of the Graduates of the Military School of Music. Guatemala. 1994 -1996
- Recognition by University of San Carlos of Guatemala and University School of Teachers for being the composer of the Hymn of that institution. 2016.
- Awarded as Guest of Honor in the Final Recital by the Da Vinci University. Guatemala. 2019.
- Honored with recognition by the Music Military Service for his significant work as a conductor and director, named the recording studio of the school of music, Lieutenant Colonel (WO) Nery Evelio Cano Arreaga (Posthumous).

== Death ==
On July 29. 2021, Nery Cano died of respiratory failure at the Military Medical Center in Guatemala City. Obituaries and notes of sympathy were published in the media and on social networks, by the Government of Guatemala, the Ministry of Culture and Sports, the Ministry of Defense and the Guatemalan Army, the National Symphony Orchestra, National Conservatory of Music, among many other institutions and companies.

=== Posthumous tributes ===
- On August 20, 2021, the Military Music Services of Guatemala, through the Martial Symphony Band (Cultural Heritage of Guatemala), paid posthumous tribute to Lieutenant Colonel (WO) Nery Evelio Cano Arreaga, placing a plaque with his name in the recording studio of the School of Music.
- On September 11 of that same year, the Martial Symphonic Band presented its annual concert (virtual) on the occasion of the Bicentennial of the Independence of Guatemala, dedicated to Maestro Nery Cano, performing pieces from his ensemble of Maderas y Metales, especially his arrangement "Guatebella" (Beautiful Guate). Also, his contribution to promoting jazz in Guatemala was honored through performances by Big Band in the same event.
- On October 13, 2021, one of the most popular Guatemalan pianists, Carlos Duarte, released his new single "Recuerdos" (Memories), a bolero composed by Duarte especially for performance by Nery Cano. This song was one of Cano's last studio works as a trumpet soloist and was released after his death.
- Posthumous tribute in Guatebrass International Festival of Trumpet Players 2021. Europlaza. Guatemala City. November 16, 2021.
