= Neri =

Neri or Néri may refer to:

== Places ==
- Neri, Iran, a village in West Azerbaijan Province
- Neri, India, a village in the north Indian state Himachal
- Neri River, a river in Ethiopia

== People and fictional characters ==
- Neri (surname)
- Neri (given name)
- Philip Neri (1515–1595), Catholic saint, patron of Rome, Philippines, comedians
- Francisco Valmerino Neri (born 1976), Brazilian footballer known as "Neri"
- Neri, a main character in the series Ocean Girl
- Al Neri, a fictional character from The Godfather

== Other uses ==
- National Environmental Research Institute of Denmark
- Neri ("blacks") faction of nobles in Medieval Italy opposing the mercantile Bianchi ("whites"), see Guelphs and Ghibellines
- Neri (grape), another name for the French wine grape Grolleau
- Neri, a starchy substance used in the manufacture of Japanese washi paper, derived from the root of the plant Abelmoschus manihot (tororo aoi)
- Néri, a Tibetan classification of mountains
- HD 32518 b, an exoplanet named Neri

== See also ==
- Nery (disambiguation)
