= San Juan Guarita =

- Municipality
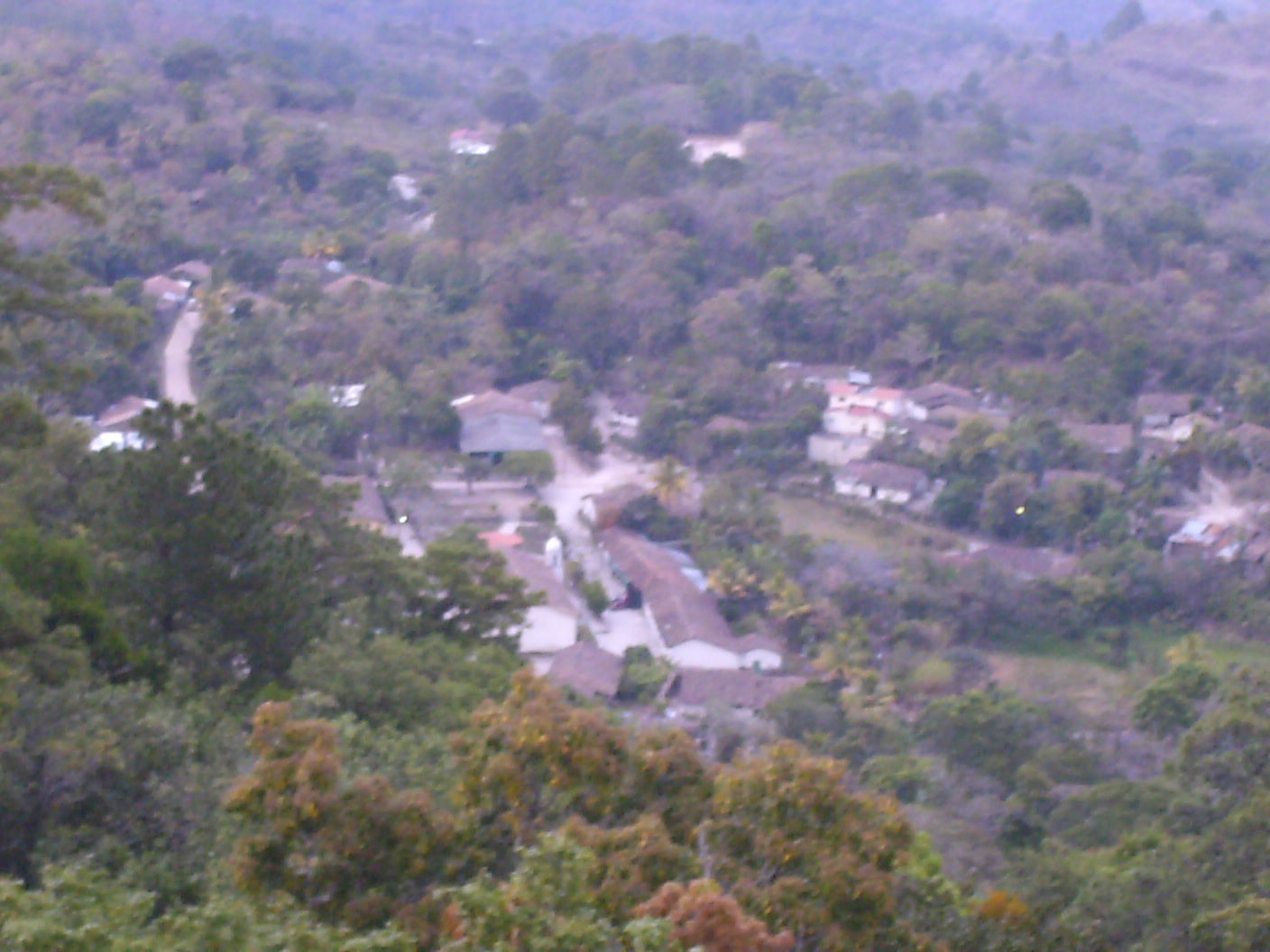
- View of San Juan Guarita

- Location in Honduras
- Coordinates: 14°11′N 88°49′W
- Country: Honduras
- Department: Lempira
- Founded: 1921

Area
  - Total: 43 km^{2} (17 sq mi)

Population
  - Total: 2,678
  - Density: 62/km^{2} (160/sq mi)
- 2015

San Juan Guarita is a municipality in the Honduran department of Lempira. It is one of the smallest municipalities of the Honduran Lempira department. The best way to access Guarita is via Santa Rosa de Copán-San Marcos de Ocotepeque-Cololaca-Guarita; travelling by car, the journey takes about 2.5 hours.

== History ==
In the census of 1887, the town appears as the village of El Rodeo, included with the town of Guarita. Between 1917 and 1919, the Indigenous population attempted to find copies of the deeds for their lands, which produced conflict among the Indigenous community and the Latinos. Under the administration of President Rafael Lopez Gutierrez, Guarita was incorporated on 21 February 1921. El Rodeo was created with land that remained after its original inhabitants informally sold their land to the Latinos of Guarita, making the acquisition of official land title difficult; these challenges and conflicts inspired the town's separation from Guarita.

On 4 July 1929, the boundaries of the Municipality of Guarita and the villages within its orbit were drawn by the Governor of Lempira and the military chief. Guarita became a city on 26 February, 1934, while under Decree Number 1187, the Municipality of San Juan Guarita was created as a separate polity at the same time. Disagreements between the two towns continued, however, and the municipality nullified the sales of land made by the Indigenous people of San Juan Guarita to the people of Guarita. Since 1935, copies of the titles for communal lands are being found and relations between San Juan Guarita and Guarita have improved.

== Geography ==
San Juan Guarita is located on the western side of a mountain, surrounded by pine and oak tree forests, among mountains which are very steep and irregular. As a consequence of forest exploitation, the weather is warming every year. In 2020, San Juan Guarita had 3.13 kha covered by natural forests, extending over 62% of the municipality's land area. By 2023, it had lost 1 ha of its natural forest areas.

== Boundaries ==
Its boundaries are:

- North: Guarita municipalities.
- South: El Salvador.
- East: Guarita municipality.
- West: Valladolid municipality.

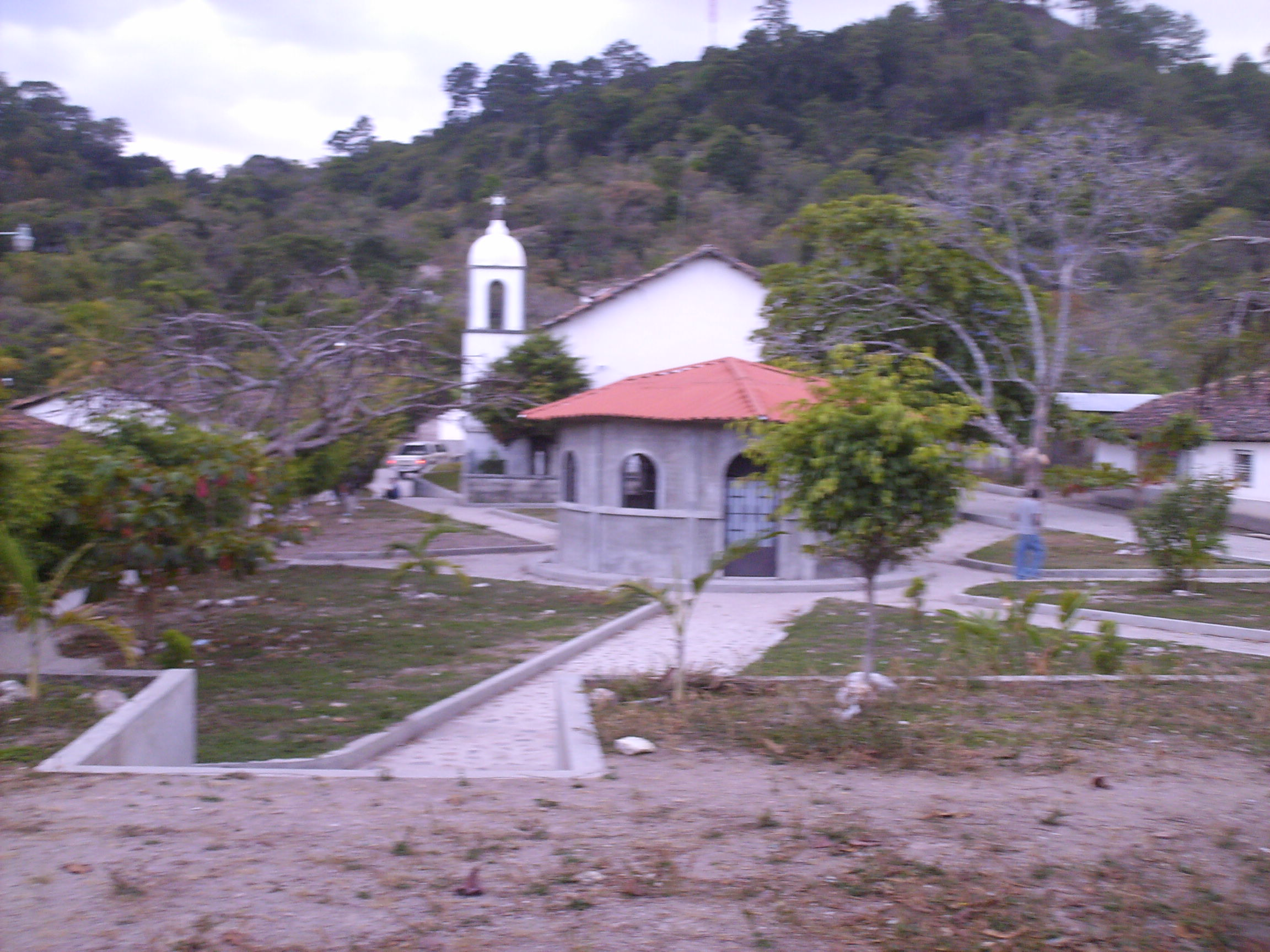
Central Park in San Juan Guarita

- Surface Extents: 43 km^{2}

== Resources ==
Due to its elevation from the sea level, San Juan Guarita provides conditions for coffee plantations. Beans and corn crops are also primary crops. As does the rest of the department, San Juan Guarita has electricity and mobile communications services. Internet access is found in the mayor's office. There are several groceries stores; gasoline and diesel fuel is available privately.

== Population ==
Mestizos (Spanish/Amerindian mixed) are the majority in this municipality.

- Population:
  - 2001: approx. 2841 people
  - 2008: approx. 2994 people
  - 2013: approx. 2650 people. Of these, 97.58% were Mestizo, 1.85% White, 0.34% Indigenous and 0.23% Black or Afro-Honduran.
- Villages: 5
- Settlements: 25

== Tourism ==
The distance between San Juan Guarita and Guarita municipality is 6.5 km, around a hill. The village is located 18.6 km south of Cololaca and 11.8 km west of the municipality of Tambla. The road between these towns is in good condition most of the year.

The primary touristic draw to San Juan Guarita is its architectural features, which are colonial and simple, along with the stillness and peace of rural Honduras. The landscape of the surrounding mountains is notable.

Salvadoran television and radio networks reach San Juan Guarita.

Local Holidays: San Juan Day, held on June 24.
