= Tomala =

Tomala may refer to:

- Tomala (surname), a Polish surname
- Tomalá, a municipality in the Honduran department of Lempira
- Tómala!, a 2002 album of Chilean band Los Tetas
