= Valladolid (disambiguation) =

Valladolid is a municipality in Spain.

Valladolid may also refer to:

== Places ==
- Valladolid Parish, Ecuador
- Valladolid, Lempira, Honduras
- Valladolid, Yucatán, Mexico
  - Valladolid Municipality, Yucatán
  - Valladolid railway station
- Morelia, Michoacán, Mexico (known as Valladolid from 1578 to 1828)
- Province of Valladolid, Spain
- Valladolid, Negros Occidental, Philippines

== People ==
- Marcela Valladolid (born 1978), American chef and author

== See also ==
- Valladolid debate, a moral debate in European history
