= Tomal (disambiguation) =

Tomal is an artisanal caste among Somali people.

Tomal or TOMAL may also refer to:

- Ttangkkeut, a headland and village in South Korea
- TOMAL (Test of Memory and Learning), a neuropsychological test
- TOMAL, a plant of diamond equipment in Tomilino, Russia
- (adjective) related to tomium
- Tomal (surname)
