= Tomalá =

- Municipality
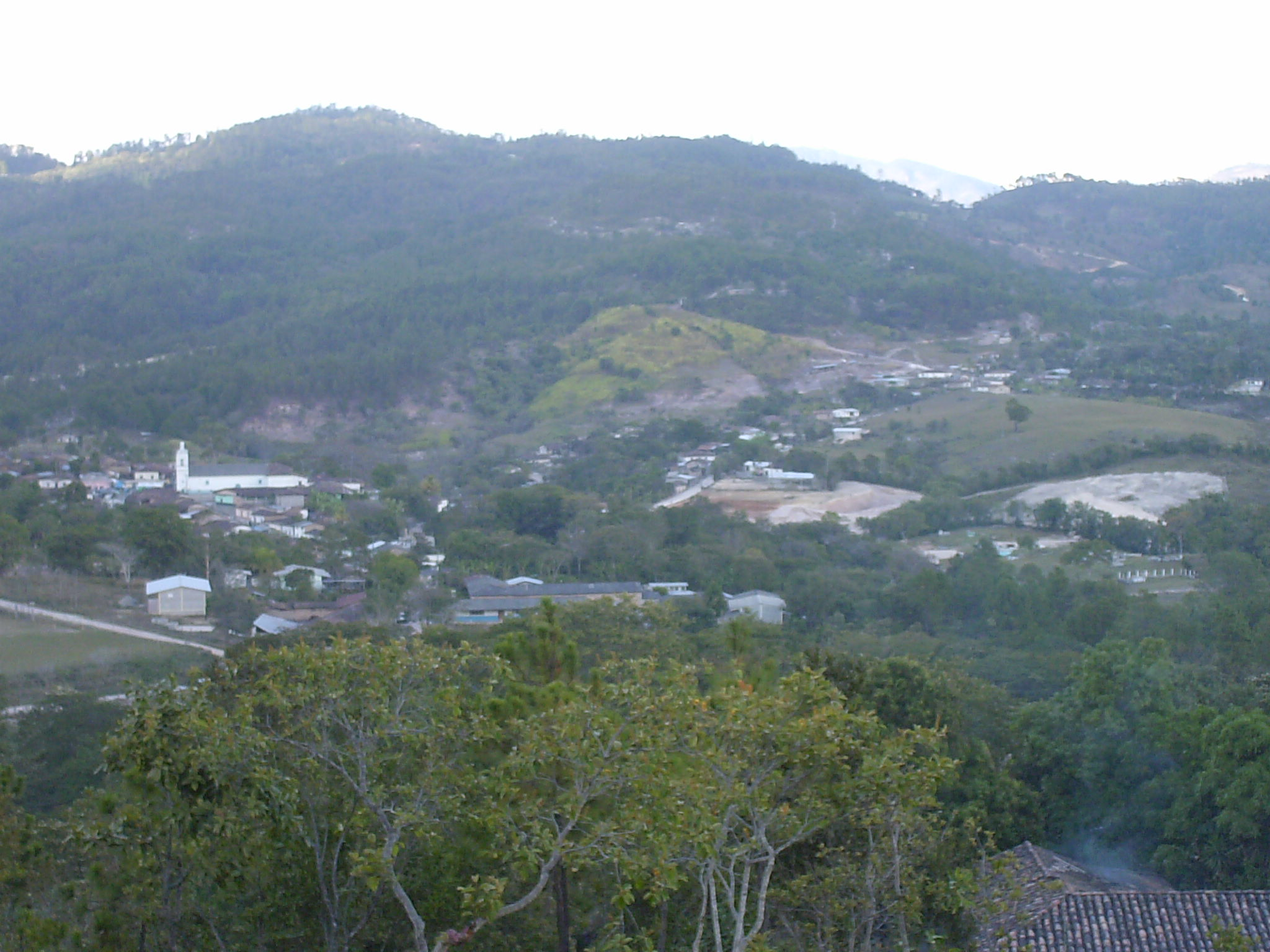
- Panoramic View of Tomalà

- Location in Honduras
- Coordinates: 14°13′N 88°47′W
- Country: Honduras
- Department: Lempira
- Villages: 13

Area
  - Total: 48 km^{2} (19 sq mi)

Population (2015)
  - Total: 6,495
  - Density: 140/km^{2} (350/sq mi)

Tomalá is a municipality in the Honduran department of Lempira.

It is one of the smallest municipalities of the Lempira department in Honduras. It is situated 10 minutes away from Tambla municipality.

== History ==
It started as a small village back in 1576. Since it was originally located on a swamp, the community decided to relocate it onto the toe of a hill, and it has been there ever since. In the census of 1791 it was a town belonging to "Curato de Sensenti" and in 1889 it was a municipality of Guarita district.

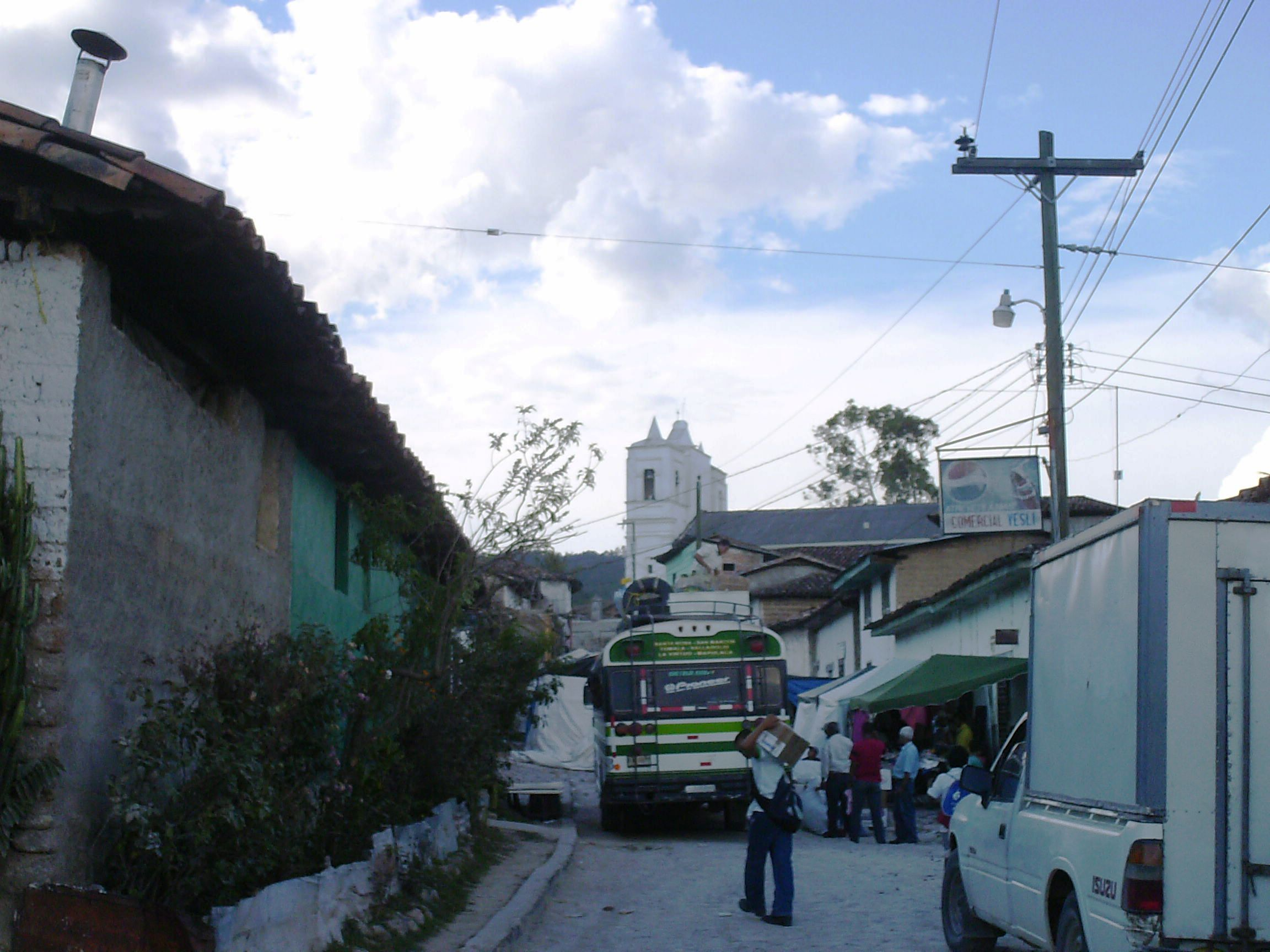
A busy street leading to downtown Of Tomalà

== Geography ==
It is situated at the top of a mountain. There are also huge mountains around the municipality capital. All of these are covered with Pine forests. The weather is very cool along the year, except for the summer because it increases a little.

== Boundaries ==
Its boundaries are:

- North : San Sebastián municipality.
- South : Tambla municipality.
- East : San Andrés municipality.
- West : Tambla municipality.
- Surface Extents: 48 km^{2} (19 sq mi)

== Resources ==
It is one more of the municipalities proper for coffee plantation. Obviously they take advantage of the elevation from sea level. The next activity is raising cattle followed by beans and corn crops. The commerce is a very important economical activity as well. As the rest of the department it has electricity in the municipality capital and mobile communications coverage.

== Population ==
- Population: the figure was 5,032 people back in 2001, for the year of 2015 the figure is expected to increase up to 6,495.
- Villages: 13
- Settlements: 33

=== Demographics ===
At the time of the 2013 Honduras census, Tomalá municipality had a population of 6,335. Of these, 84.37% were Indigenous (84.33% Lenca), 10.91% Mestizo, 3.20% White, 1.48% Black or Afro-Honduran and 0.03% others.

== Tourism ==
In order to arrive to its municipality capital is better to go via Santa Rosa de Copán-San Marcos de Ocotepeque-Cololaca-Tambla. It takes about 2 hr, the road up to Cololaca is being paved, but once one passes Cololaca the road is in very good conditions. This town will sure a very pleasant visit for the traveler, because it is located at a very quite and nice place, with many Pine forests and magnificent views to other mountain ranges, especially "Congolón". The parades and holidays are very crowded for their entertainment and "showy". The people are very welcoming and nice as well. Its church is dated 1904, and they take good care of it. It looks like time never passes by in this place.

- Local Holidays: "San Francisco de Asis" day on October 4 and "Inmaculada Concepción" day on December 8.

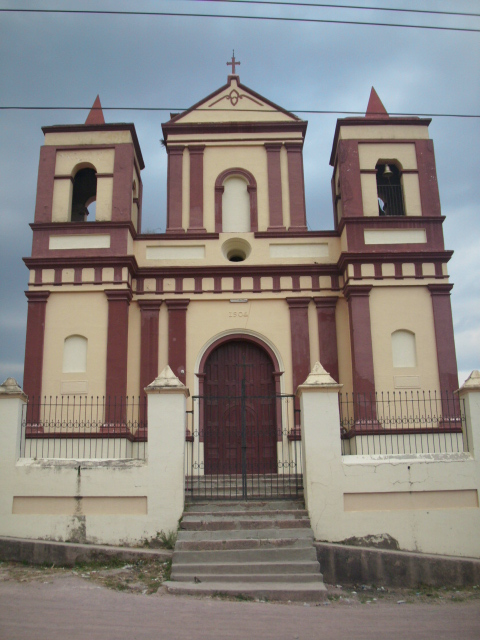
Tomalà church
