= Valladolid, Honduras =

Valladolid
- Municipality
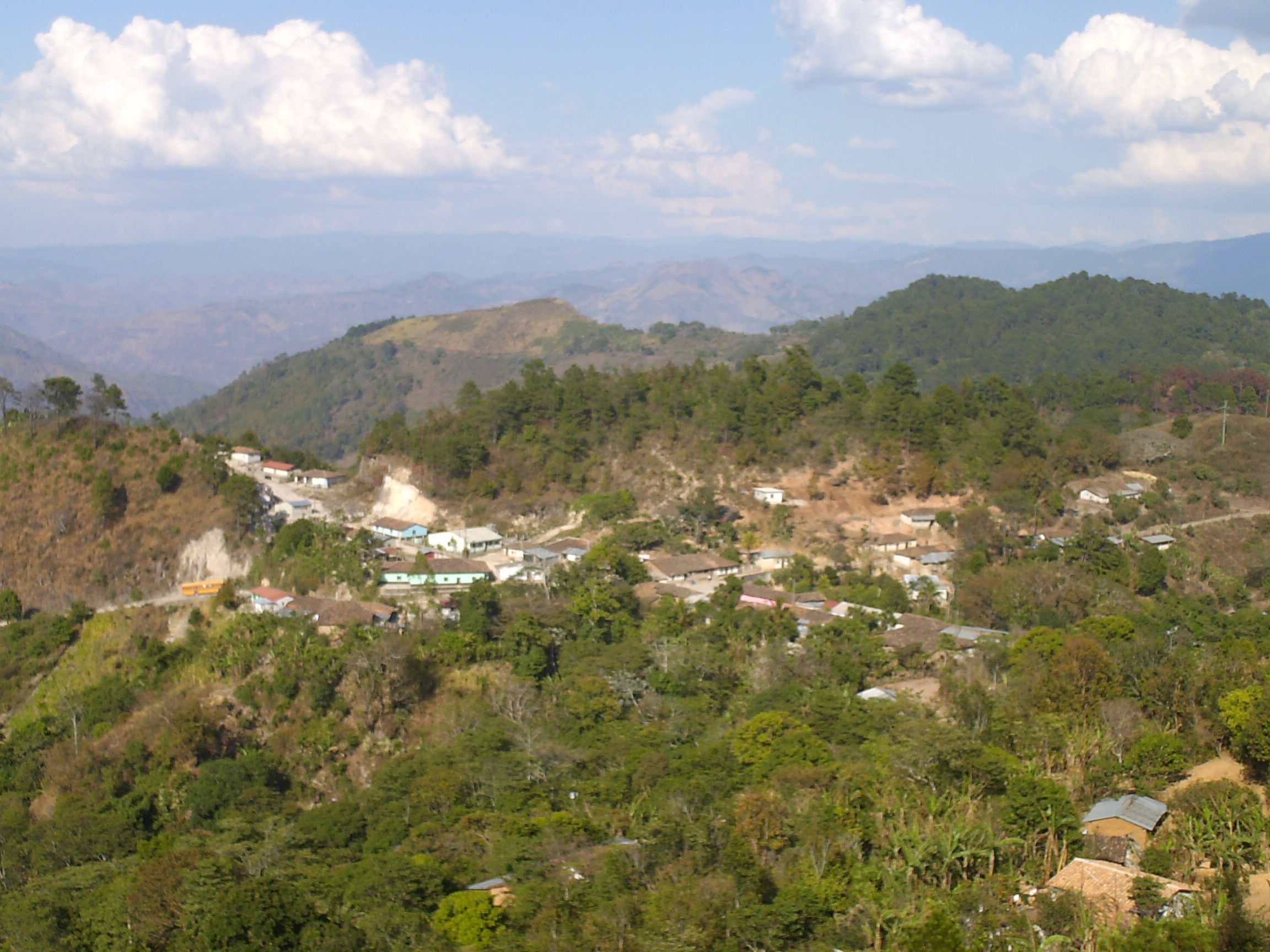
- A view of the northern exit to Tambla

- Location in Honduras
- Coordinates: 14°9′0″N 88°43′6″W
- Country: Honduras
- Department: Lempira
- Villages: 12

Area
  - Total: 81 km^{2} (31 sq mi)

Population (2015)
  - Total: 3,747
  - Density: 46/km^{2} (120/sq mi)

Valladolid is one of the municipalities of the Lempira department of Honduras. It takes about 2.5 hours to travel there and it must be via Santa Rosa de Copán–San Marcos de Ocotepeque–Cololaca–Tambla–Valladolid.

== History ==
It was founded in the "Los Patios" village, with the former name of "Colopel", it was later relocated to "Los Naranjos" villages, where it is nowadays; and the name was changed to Valladolid. In the census of 1887 it was registered as a municipality of Guarita district.

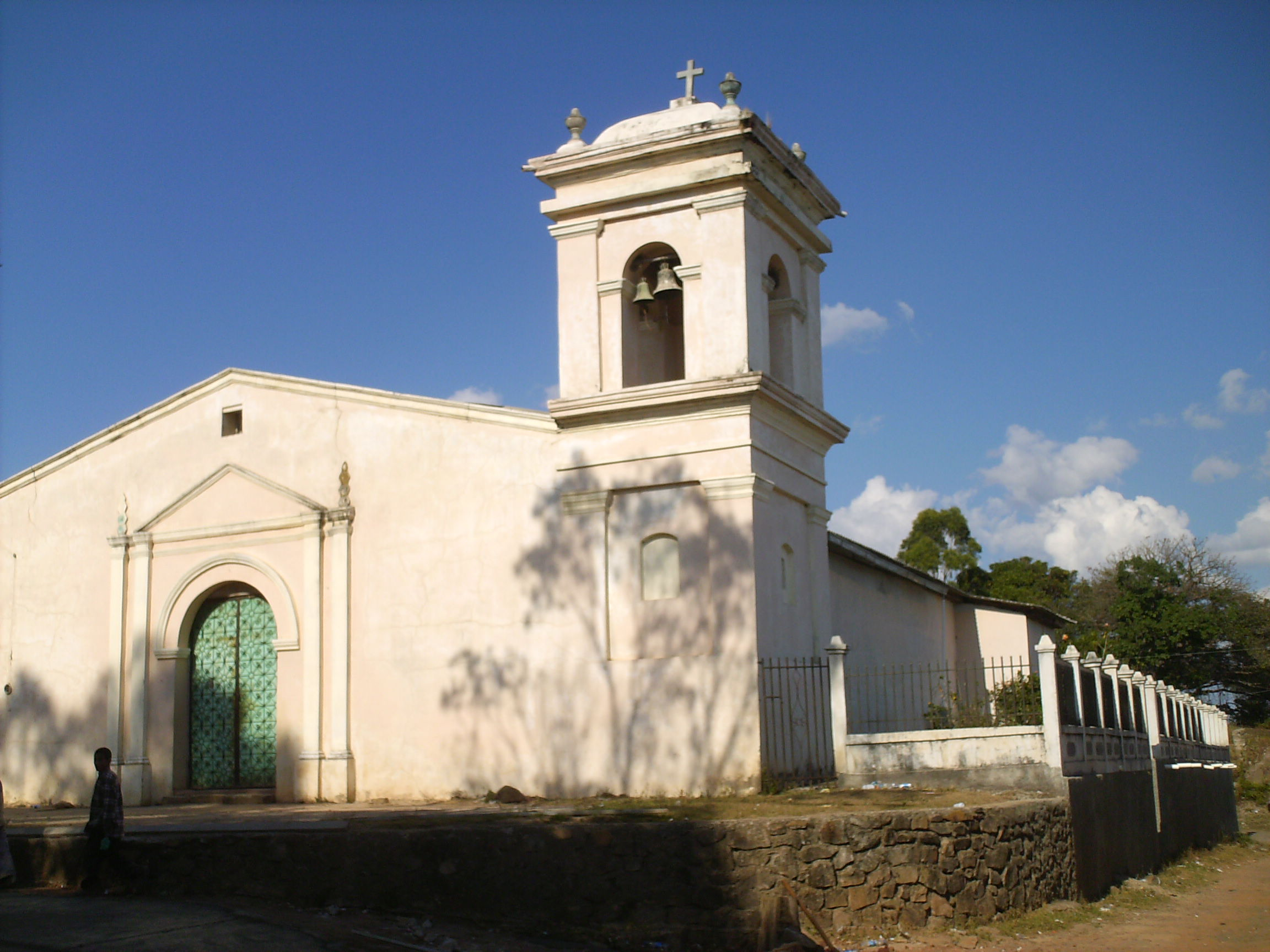
Valladolid church

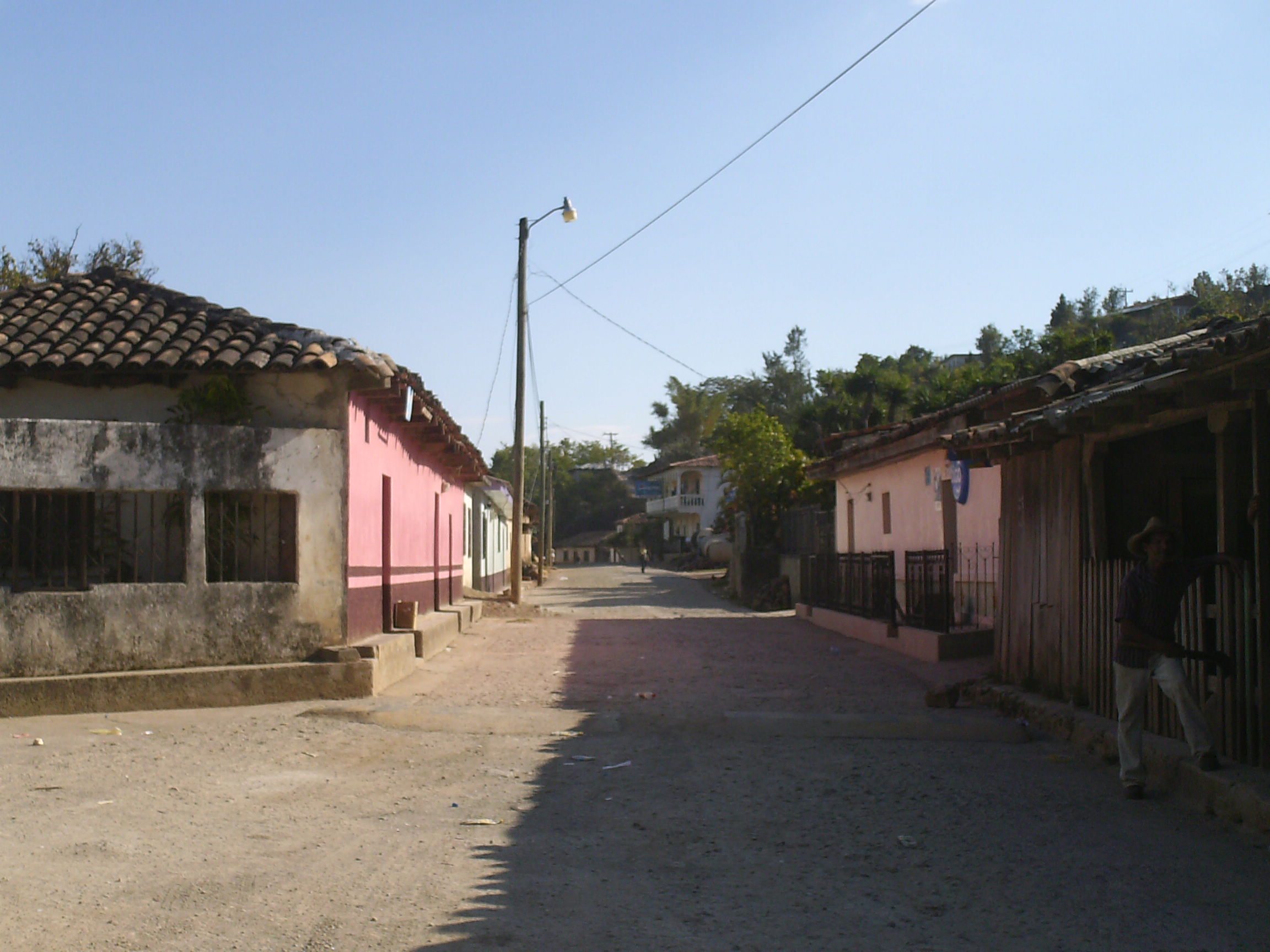
A Street in Valladolid

== Geography ==
The origin of the rocks and soils in its mountains is totally volcanic. This is clearly seen on the slopes of the road. The municipality capital is on top of a mountain, and there are many pine forest and some sub tropical trees to provide shade to coffee plants. The weather is very cool because of the elevation and the Pine forests.

== Boundaries ==
Its boundaries are:

- North: Tambla municipality.
- South: La Virtud municipality.
- East: San Andrés and Gualcince municipalities.
- West: Guarita and San Juan Guarita municipalities.
- Surface Extents: 74 km^{2}

== Resources ==
It is one more of the municipalities proper for coffee plantation. The second main activity is commerce, starting with groceries followed by several supplies for construction and farming. Cattle raising, beans and corn crops are mostly for local consumption. It has electricity and mobile communication services. It also has a couple of hardware stores.

== Population ==
- Population: The amount of inhabitants was 3,646 and according to INE Honduras estimates, there will be 3,747 in 2015. (these figures are subject to verification)
- Villages: 12
- Settlements: 44

=== Demographics ===
At the time of the 2013 Honduras census, Valladolid municipality had a population of 3,696. Of these, 72.58% were Mestizo, 14.29% Indigenous (14.23% Lenca), 12.64% White and 0.49% Black or Afro-Honduran.

== Tourism ==
The municipal capital is reached by a road that includes steep sections and sharp curves. Some streets in the town are paved with stone, and the surrounding area includes pine-covered mountains.

The municipality celebrates the feat of San Antonio on June 13.
