= Tomal (surname) =

Tomal is a Polish-language surname. It is a patronymic surname derived from the given name Tomasz. Notable people with this surname include:

- George Tomal, American dancer, a founder of the New Jersey Ballet
- Marsha Tomal, American musician of Daughters of Eve
- Zdzisław Tomal (1921–1984), Polish agrarian, politician and statesman

== See also ==
- Tomala (surname)
