= Thomalla =

Thomalla and Tomalla are surnames of Polish origin, Germanized forms of the Polish-language surname Tomala. Notable people with the surname include:

- Denis Thomalla (born 1992), German footballer
- Georg Thomalla (1915–1999), German actor
- Hans Thomalla (born 1975), German composer
- Jett Thomalla (born 2007), American football player
- Richard Thomalla (1903–1945), Nazi SS officer and Holocaust perpetrator, executed for war crimes
- Simone Thomalla (born 1965), German actress
- Sophia Thomalla (born 1989), German actress, model, and television presenter
- Walter Tomalla, founder of the Tomalla Foundation
