= Tambla =

- Municipality
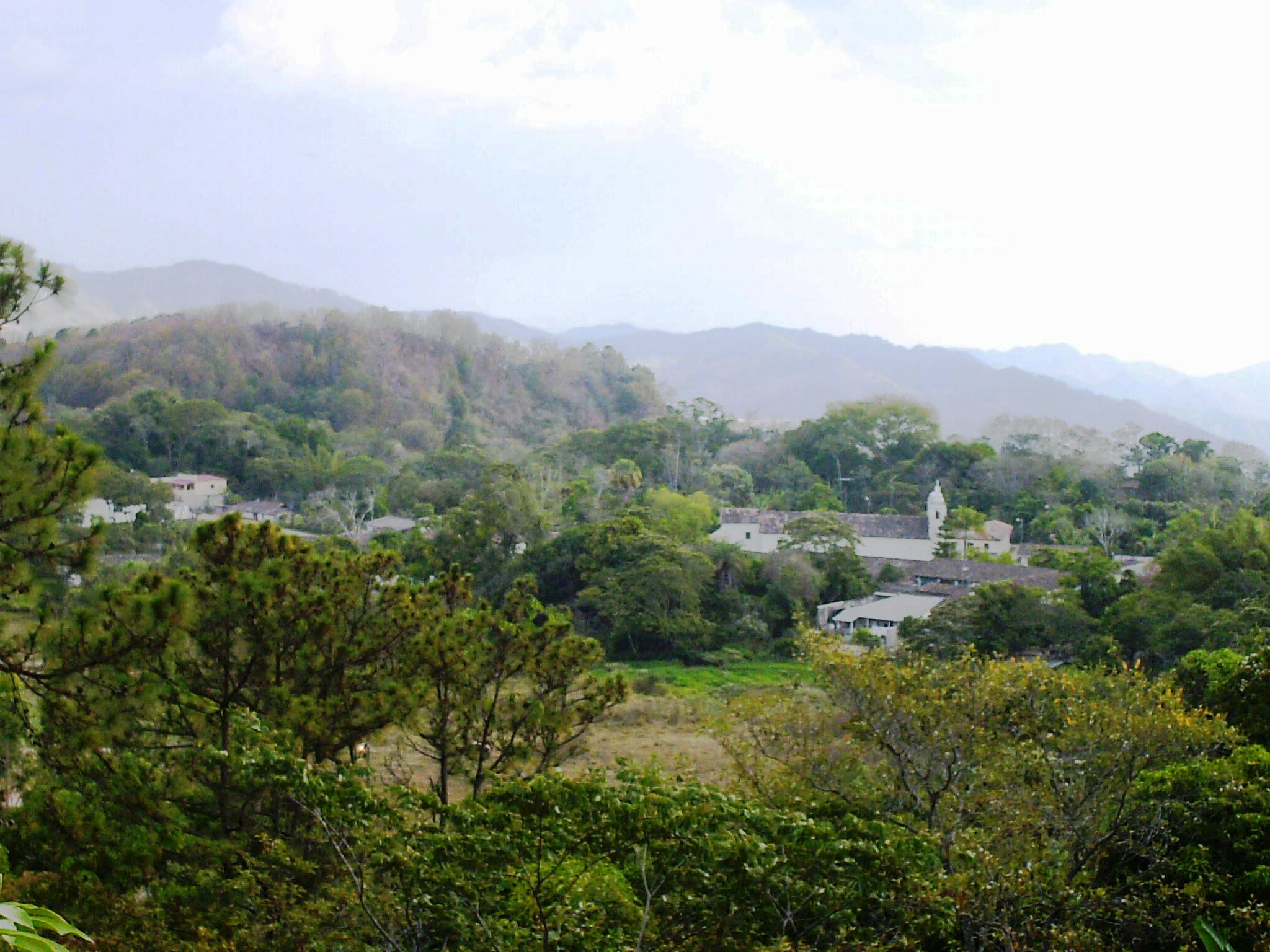
- An Overview of town

- Location in Honduras
- Coordinates: 14°11′6″N 88°46′6″W
- Country: Honduras
- Department: Lempira
- Villages: 4
- Municipality since: 11 September 1896; 130 years ago

Government
  - Mayor: Remberto Ruíz

Area
  - Total: 59 km^{2} (23 sq mi)

Population (2015)
  - Total: 3,221
  - Density: 55/km^{2} (140/sq mi)
- Time zone: UTC-6

Tambla is a municipality in the Honduran department of Lempira.

It is one of the municipalities of the Lempira department. To arrive to its municipality capital is better to go via Santa Rosa de Copán-San Marcos de Ocotepeque-Cololaca-Tambla.

== History ==
At the beginning it was located at "El Zorrillal" village, because of the dryness of the land, all the people decided to move to another place. It was then located at a place known as "Pueblo Viejo". In the census of 1887, it was a village of Tomalá. The administration of Policarpo Bonilla issued the decree stating that the creation of the municipality was on 11 September 1896.

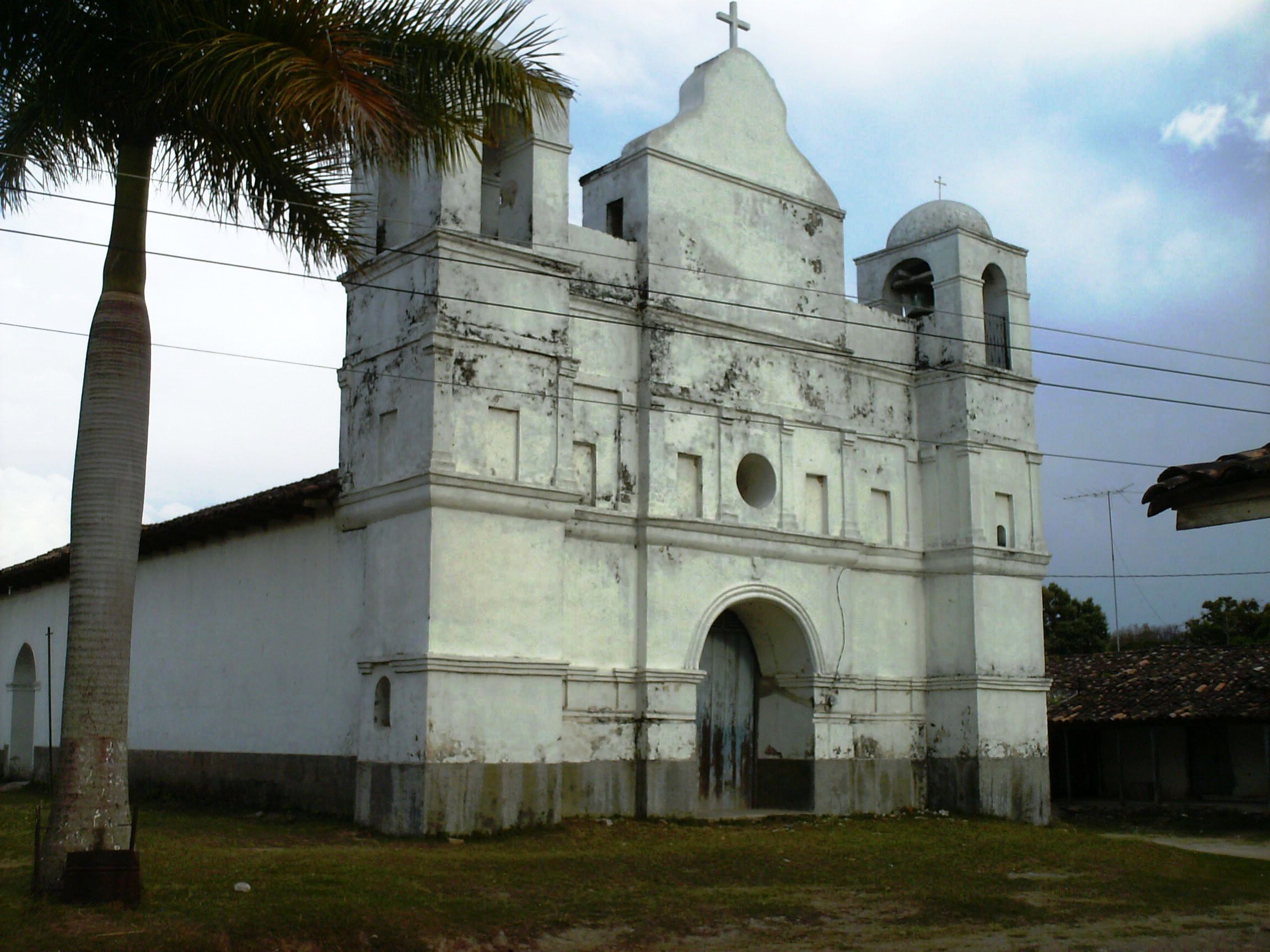
The Colonial Church of Tambla

== Geography ==
It is situated at the top of a mountain. There are also huge mountains around the municipality capital. All of these are covered with pine forests. The weather is very cool all year long, except during the summer, when the temperature increases slightly.

== Boundaries ==
Its boundaries are:

- North : Tomalá municipality.
- South : Guarita and Valladolid municipalities.
- East : San Andrés and Tomalá municipalities.
- West : Guarita municipality.
- Surface Extents: 59 km^{2}

== Resources ==
It is one of the many municipalities proper for coffee plantations. Obviously they take advantage of the elevation from sea level. The next activity is raising cattle followed by beans and corn crops. The commerce is a very important economical activity as well. As the rest of the department it has electricity in the municipality capital and mobile communications coverage.

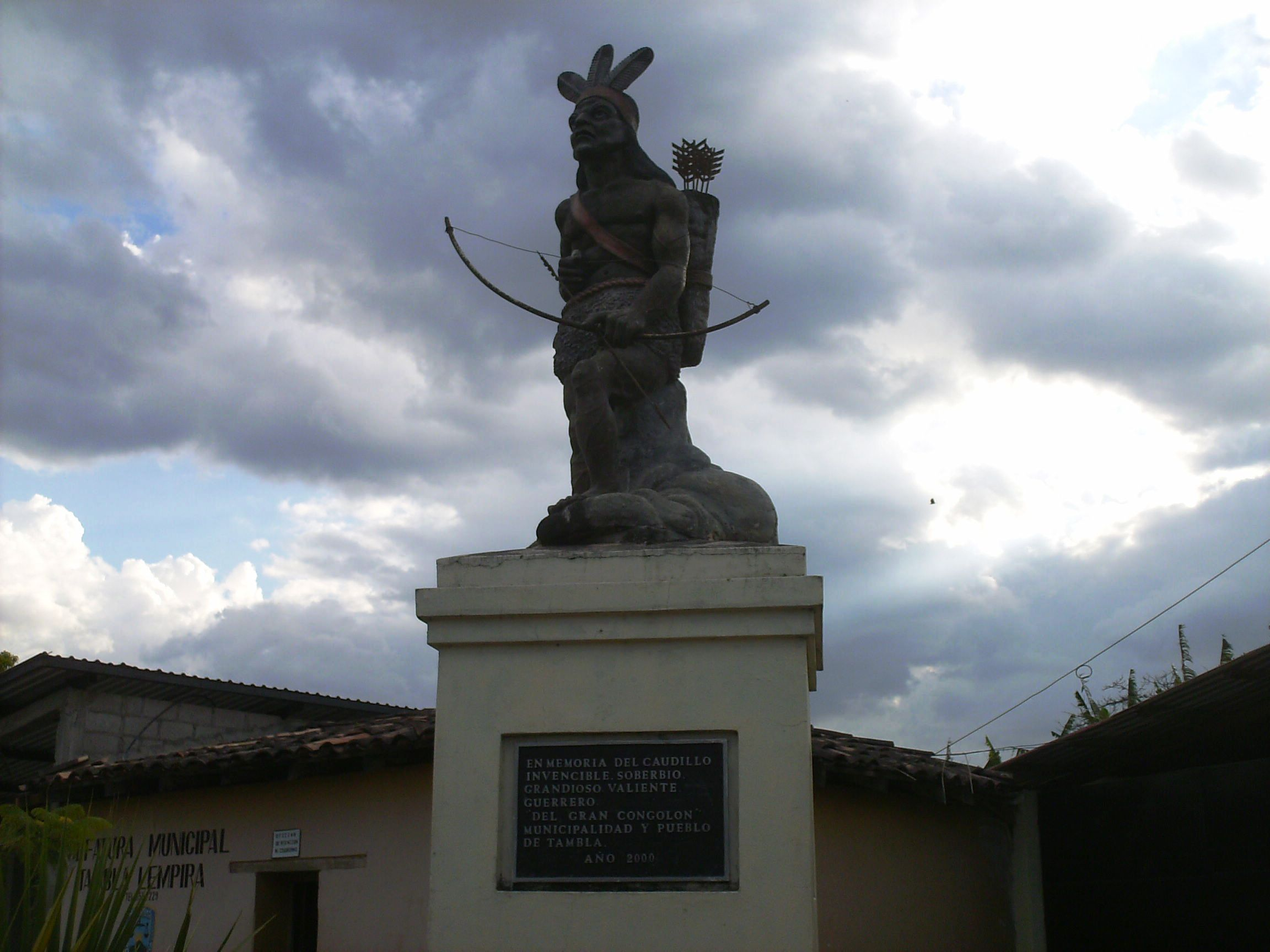
A Tribute to Lempira Chief

== Population ==
- Population: the figure was 2,314 people back in 2001, for the year of 2015 the figure is expected to increase up to 3,221.
- Villages: 4
- Settlements: 40

=== Demographics ===
At the time of the 2013 Honduras census, Tambla municipality had a population of 3,089. Of these, 67.92% were Mestizo, 27.58% Indigenous (27.42% Lenca), 4.11% White and 0.39% Black or Afro-Honduran.

== Tourism ==
It is only 10 minutes away from Tomalá municipality. This municipality has several attractions including a statue and plaque in honour of Lempira chief.

- Local Holidays: "San Francisco de Asis" day on 4 October and "Inmaculada Concepción" day on 8 December.
