= Guarita =

- Municipality
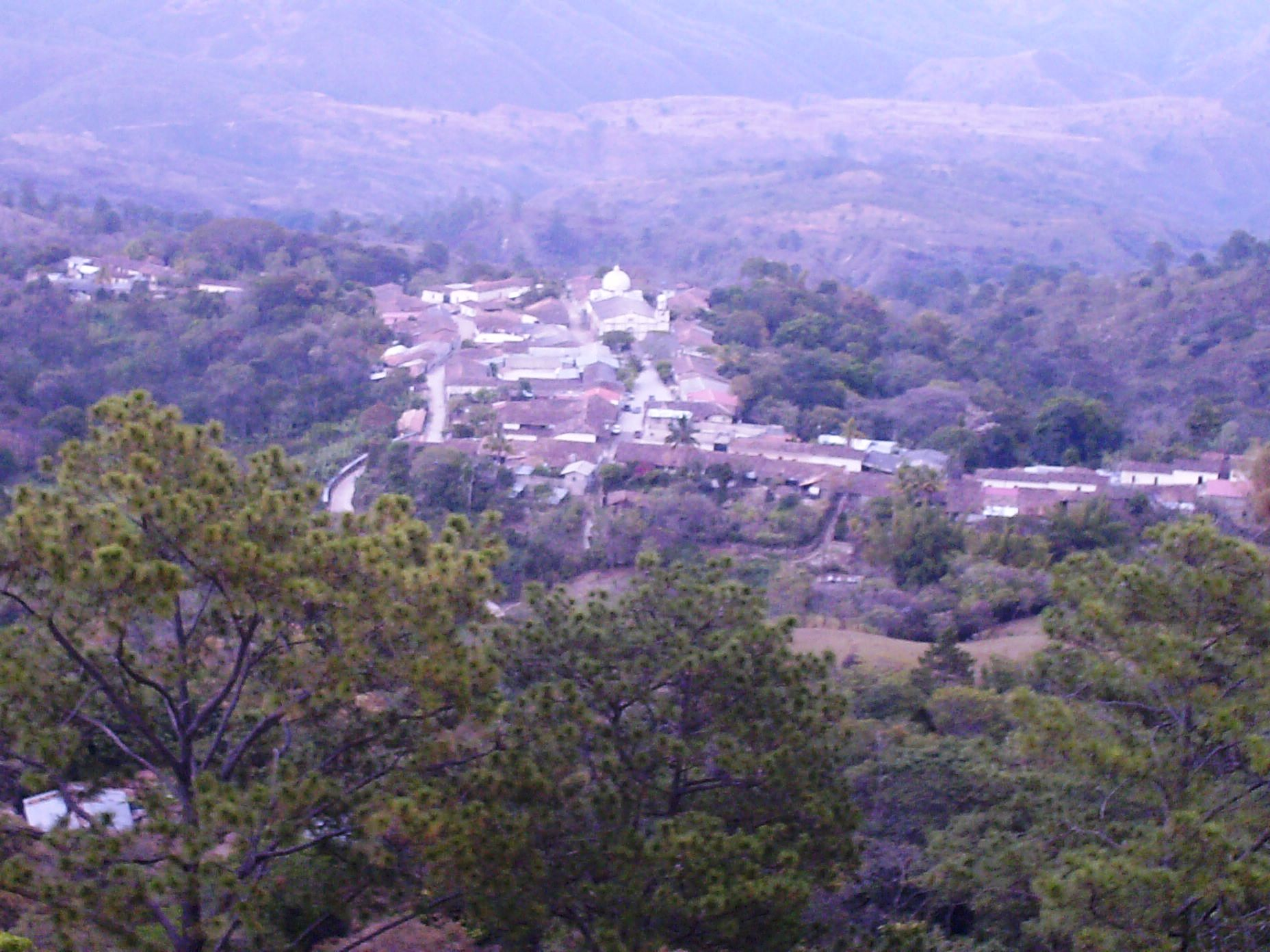
- Panoramic View of Guarita

- Location in Honduras
- Coordinates: 14°10′0″N 88°47′6″W
- Country: Honduras
- Department: Lempira
- Municipality: 20 November 1795; 230 years ago
- City: 20 March 1934; 92 years ago

Area
  - Total: 172 km^{2} (66 sq mi)

Population (2015)
  - Total: 8,509
  - Density: 49.5/km^{2} (128/sq mi)

Guarita is a municipality in the Honduran department of Lempira.

It is one of the oldest municipalities of the Lempira department. The best way to go to Guarita is via Santa Rosa de Copán-San Marcos de Ocotepeque-Cololaca-Guarita and it takes about 2.5 hours. This way is much preferable than going via Gracias. The distance between Guarita and San Juan Guarita municipality is scarcely half hill. The road is in good condition most of the year. The deviation is located about 20 km from Cololaca, taking a right. The left deviation leads to the Tambla municipality.

== History ==
In the census of 1,791 it was part of "El Curato de Sensenti", the deed of land as a municipality was given on November 20, 1795. It became a city on March 20, 1934.

== Geography ==
Guarita is based on the half of a mountain. It is surrounded by pine and oak tree forests. Also the mountains and hills are very steep and irregular. The weather has changed from cool to warmer every year due to the Forest exploitation.

== Boundaries ==
Its boundaries are:

- North : Cololaca and San Sebastián municipalities.
- South : El Salvador .
- East : Tambla and San Juan Guarita municipalities.
- West : Cololaca municipality and El Salvador.
- Surface Extents: 172 km²

== Resources ==
Because of its elevation from the sea level. Guarita provides the conditions for coffee plantations. There is also the forest exploitation as an issue of economical activity. Bean and corn crops can not miss, as they are part of the culture in the whole country. As the rest of the department, Guarita has electricity and mobile communications. There are two places that provide Internet access.

== Population ==
The cross-breed of Spanish settlers and native Indian is the majority in Guarita.

- Population: this municipality had approximately 7,964 people in 2001. The INE used this figure to elaborate estimates, and the number of people in 2008 could be 8,592.
- Villages: 10
- Settlements: 128

=== Demographics ===
At the time of the 2013 Honduras census, Guarita municipality had a population of 8,378. Of these, 98.11% were Mestizo, 0.90% White, 0.81% Indigenous and 0.17% Black or Afro-Honduran.

== Tourism ==
Guarita was one of the first organizations of the Spanish colonization; it can be considered that it was part of the "Curato de Sensenti" and distinct to the other organizations that were emerging throughout the history of the department. The architectural style of Guarita is simplistic and colonial. Salvadoran media has an important influence in the municipality.

- Local holidays: "Santa Cruz" day; 3–5 May.

== Gallery ==
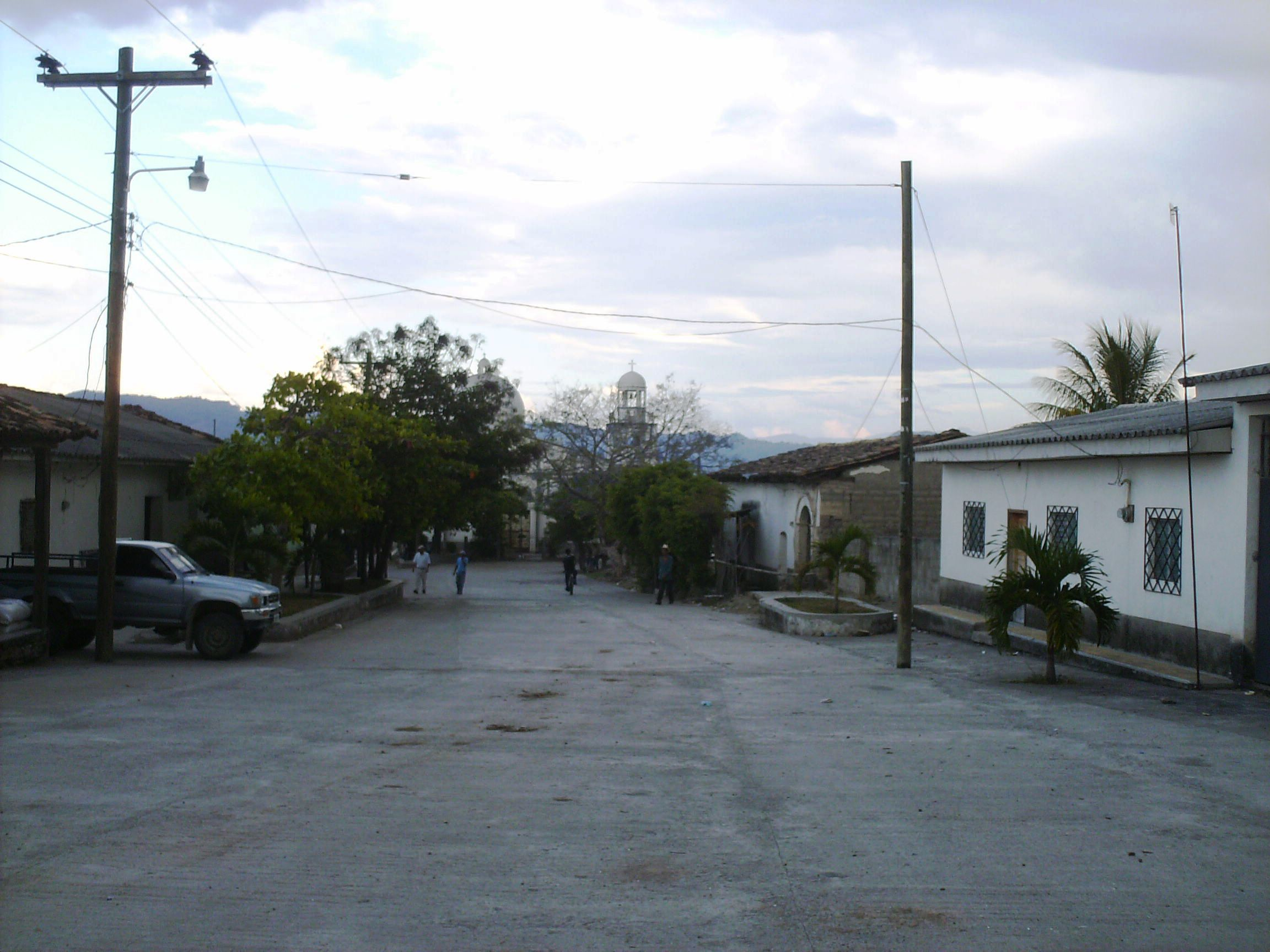
Neighborhood of Guarita

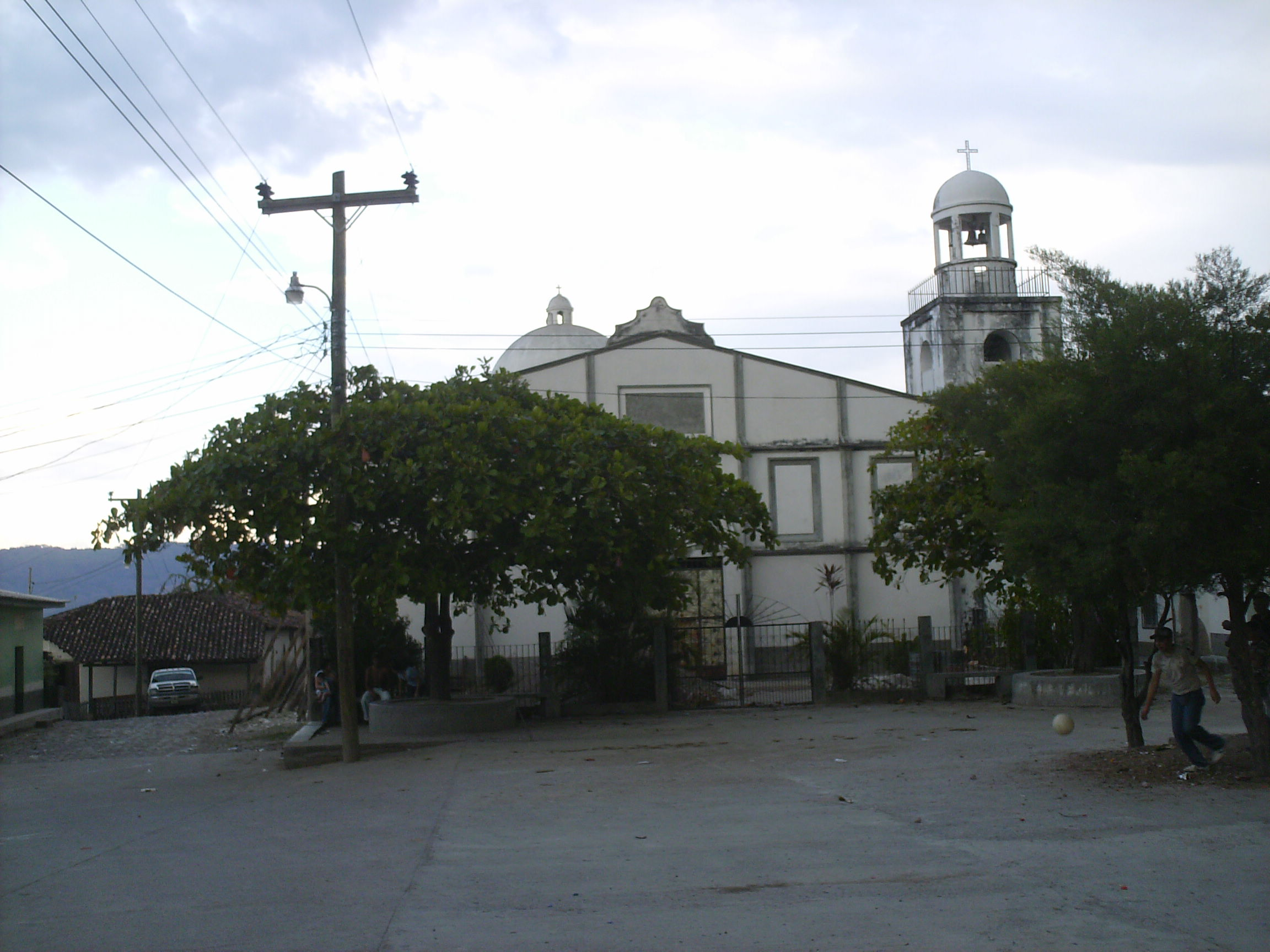
The Colonial Church of Guarita

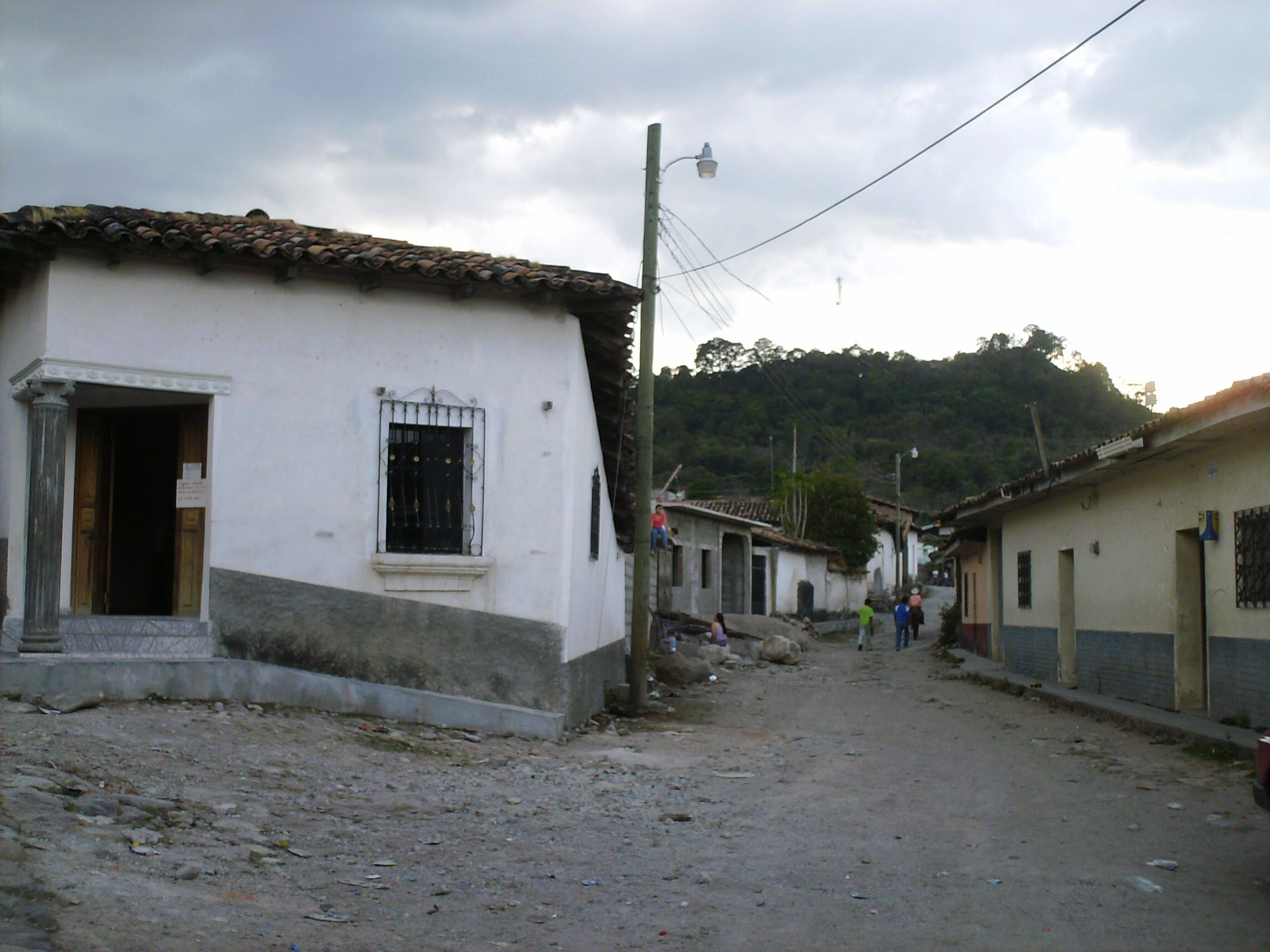
Streets in Guarita

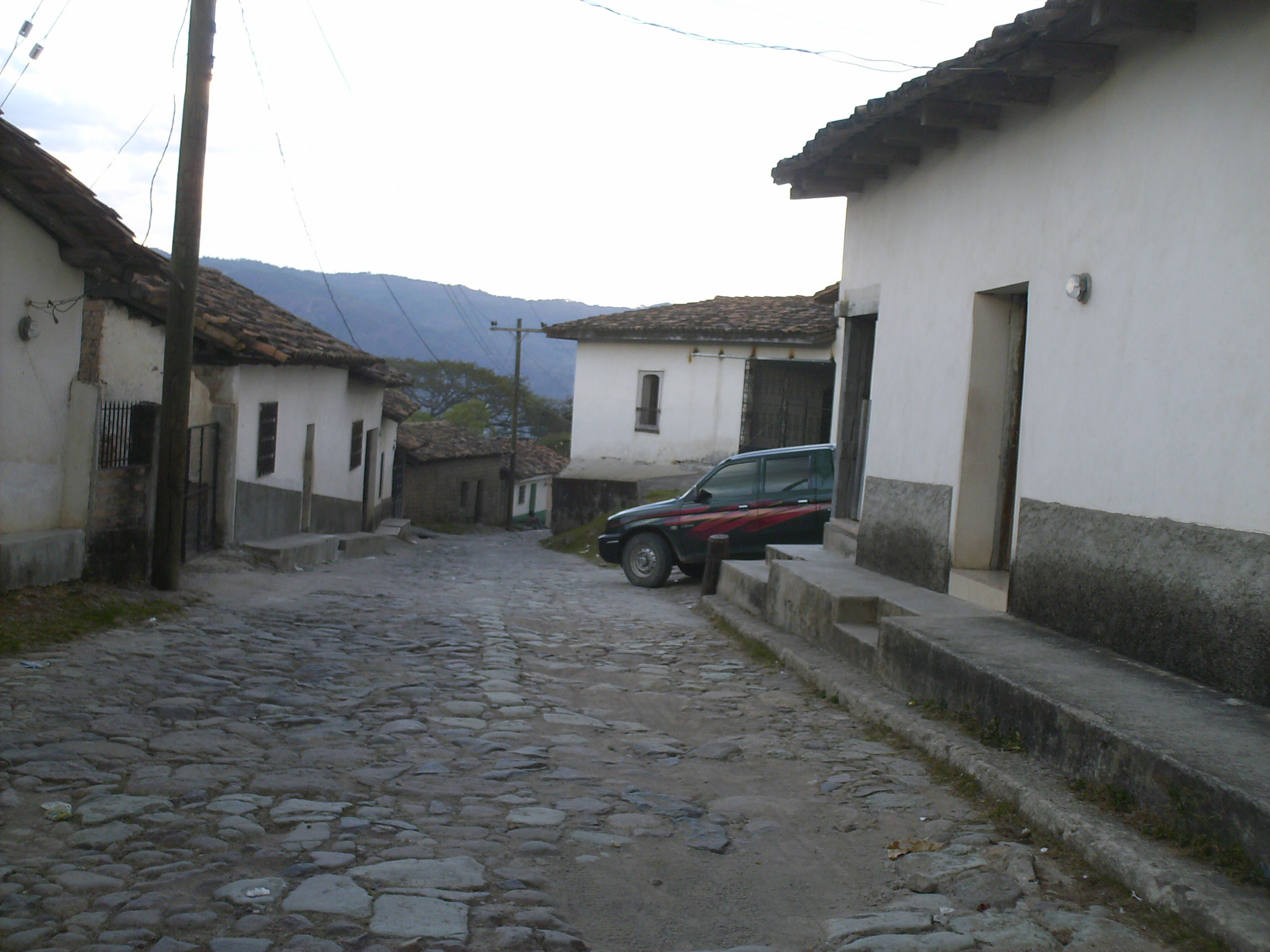
An Alley in Guarita
