= Tomala (surname) =

Tomala is a Polish-language surname. It is a patronymic surname derived from the given name Tomasz. Germanized forms of the surname include Thomalla and Tomalla.

Notable people with this surname include:

- Dawid Tomala (born 1989), Polish race walker
- Grzegorz Tomala (born 1974), Polish footballer
- Joanna Tomala (born 1994) Polish sports shooter
