= Cololaca =

- Municipality
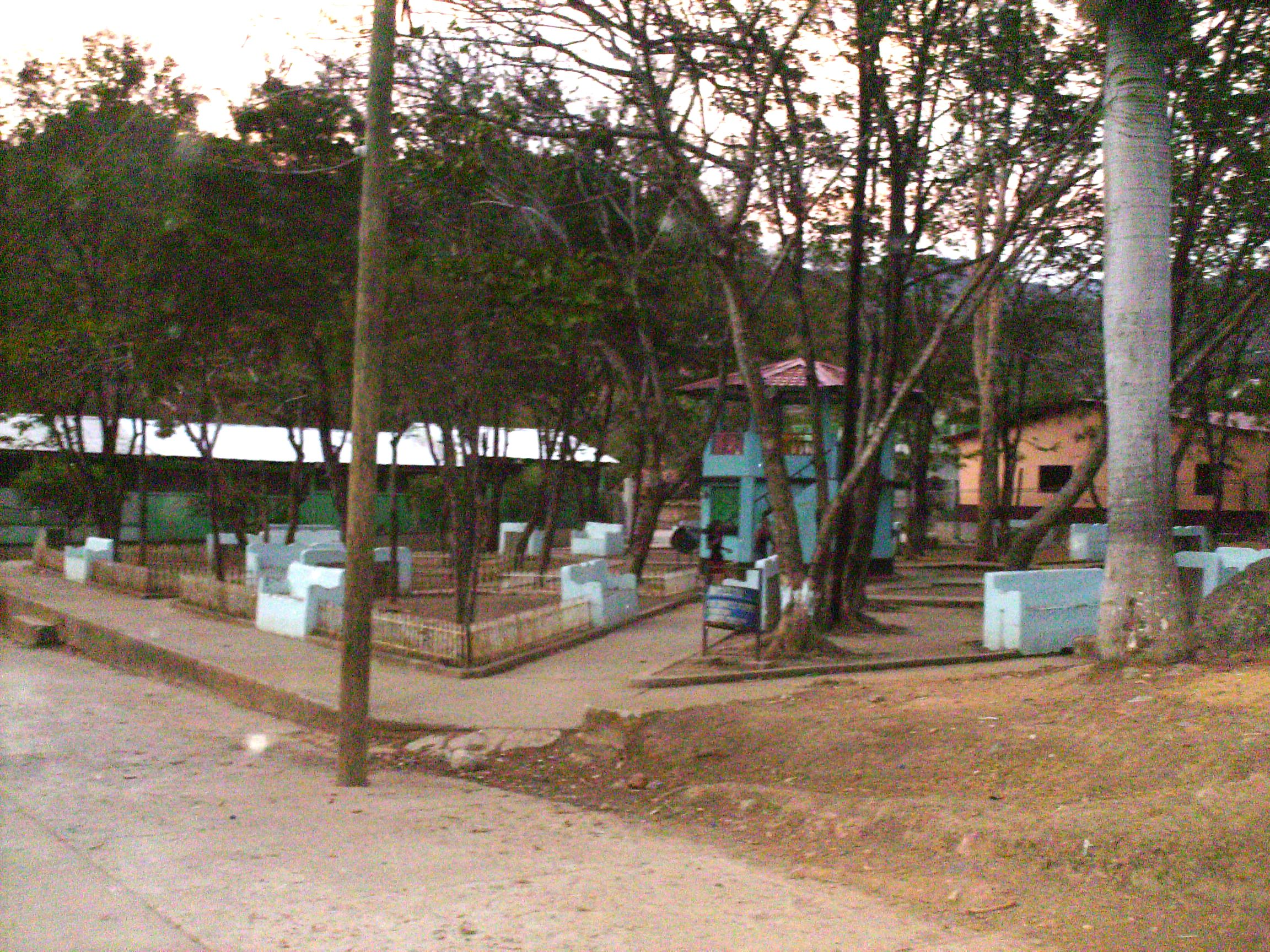
- Central Park of Cololaca

- Location in Honduras
- Coordinates: 14°18′N 88°53′W
- Country: Honduras
- Department: Lempira
- Municipality since: 1835

Area
  - Total: 221 km^{2} (85 sq mi)

Population (2015)
  - Total: 9,093
  - Density: 41.1/km^{2} (107/sq mi)
- Climate: Aw

Cololaca is a municipality in the Honduran department of Lempira.

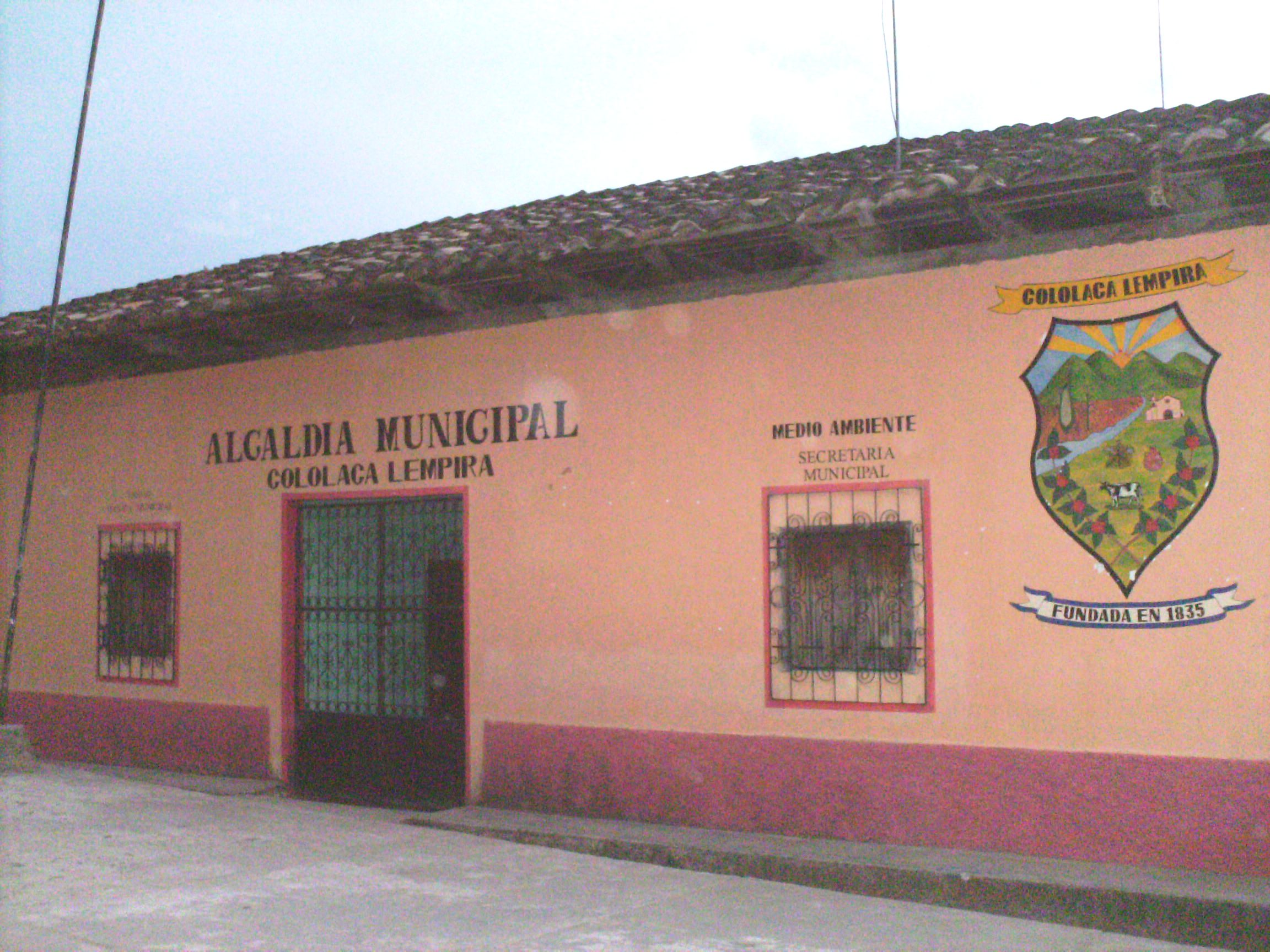
Mayor's Office across Central Park

Cololaca is one of the municipalities of the Lempira department. It is located more than 200 km away from Gracias. There is also an alternate way to go there, and that is taking a deviation in San Marcos de Ocotepeque. Taking this unpaved road takes about 30 minutes to Cololaca. The Government is currently working on paving the road from San Marcos de Ocotepeque to Cololaca.

== History ==
It started in a private property, that belonged to an old community, back in 1628. According to tales of elderly inhabitants, it became legal as a municipality in 1835, from Guarita district.

== Geography ==
The forests around Cololaca are Dry Sub Tropical forest, because they reflect the lack of water, but during the rainy season everything becomes green. It has high and steep hills. And also many places ideal for cattle.

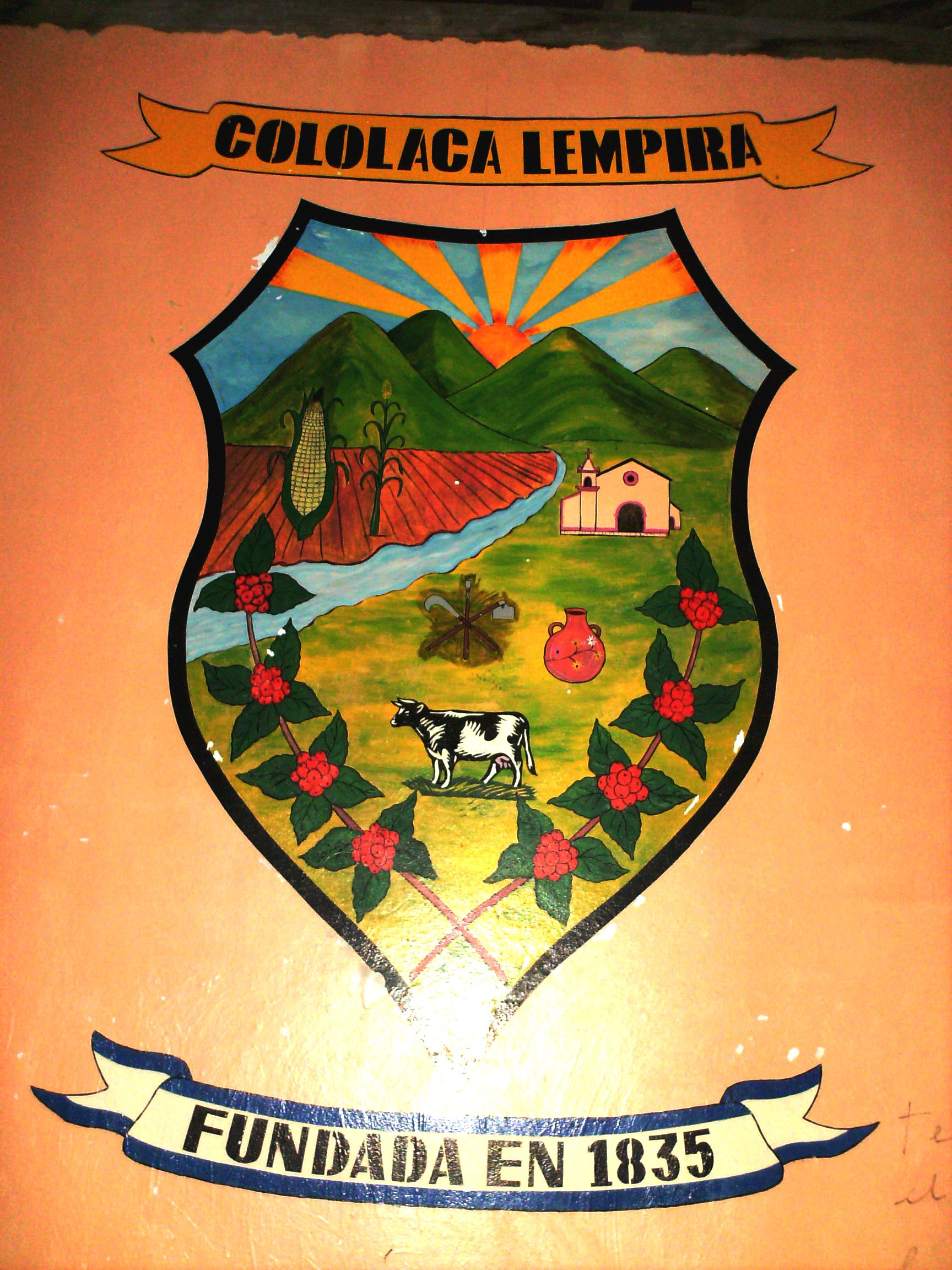
Parque Central de Cololaca

== Boundaries ==
Its boundaries are:

- North : San Marcos de Caiquin municipality
- South : Guarita municipality
- East : San Sebastián and Guarita municipalities
- West : Ocotepeque department and El Salvador
- Surface Extents: 221 km²

== Resources ==
The elevation and soil do not allow coffee plantations, but the processes of peeling, drying and toasting of coffee grains are done. Corn and bean crops are very important. But also vegetable are sown for local distribution. Cattle, milk and milk products are common in Cololaca. Since it is near San Marcos de Ocotepeque, the commerce activities are very fluid, and is the main provider for Cololaca.

== Population ==
The typical cross-breed of native Indians and Spanish settlers is seen in Cololaca.

- Population: The figure was 5,531, in 2001. An estimate was based on this, in order to have the figure of 6,498 people for 2008.
- Villages: 5
- Settlements: 113

=== Demographics ===
At the time of the 2013 Honduras census, Cololaca municipality had a population of 8,532. Of these, 98.12% were Mestizo, 1.07% Indigenous (0.90% Lenca), 0.42% Black or Afro-Honduran and 0.39% White.

== Tourism ==
Cololaca has the typical distribution of colonial architecture. There is electricity and coverage for mobile phones. There are no recommendable hostels in Cololaca, but San Marcos de Ocotepeque is near with very good accommodations and venues for entertainment.

- Local Holidays: "Dia de la Candelaria" on February 2.

== Gallery ==
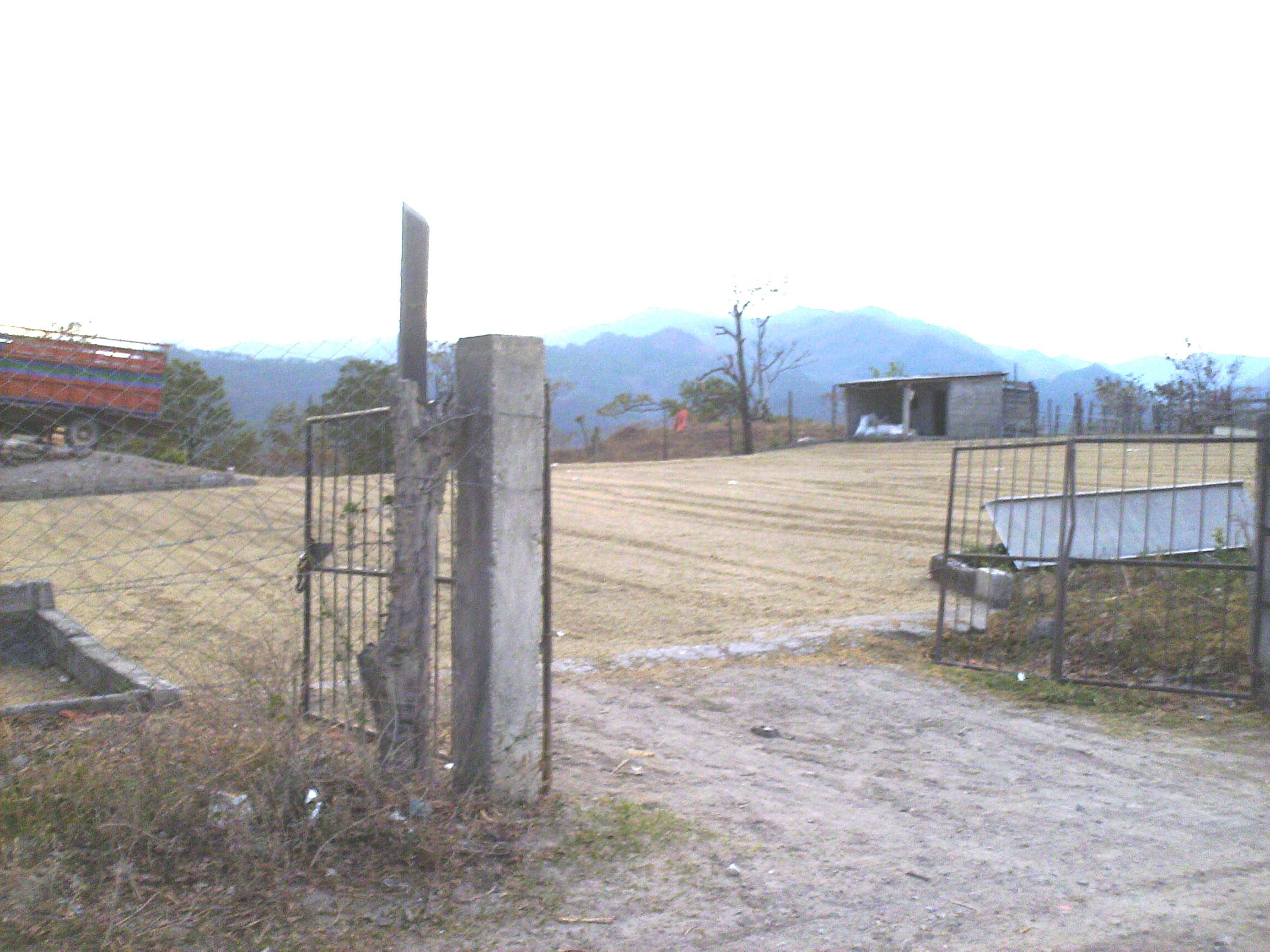
Toasting Coffee Grains

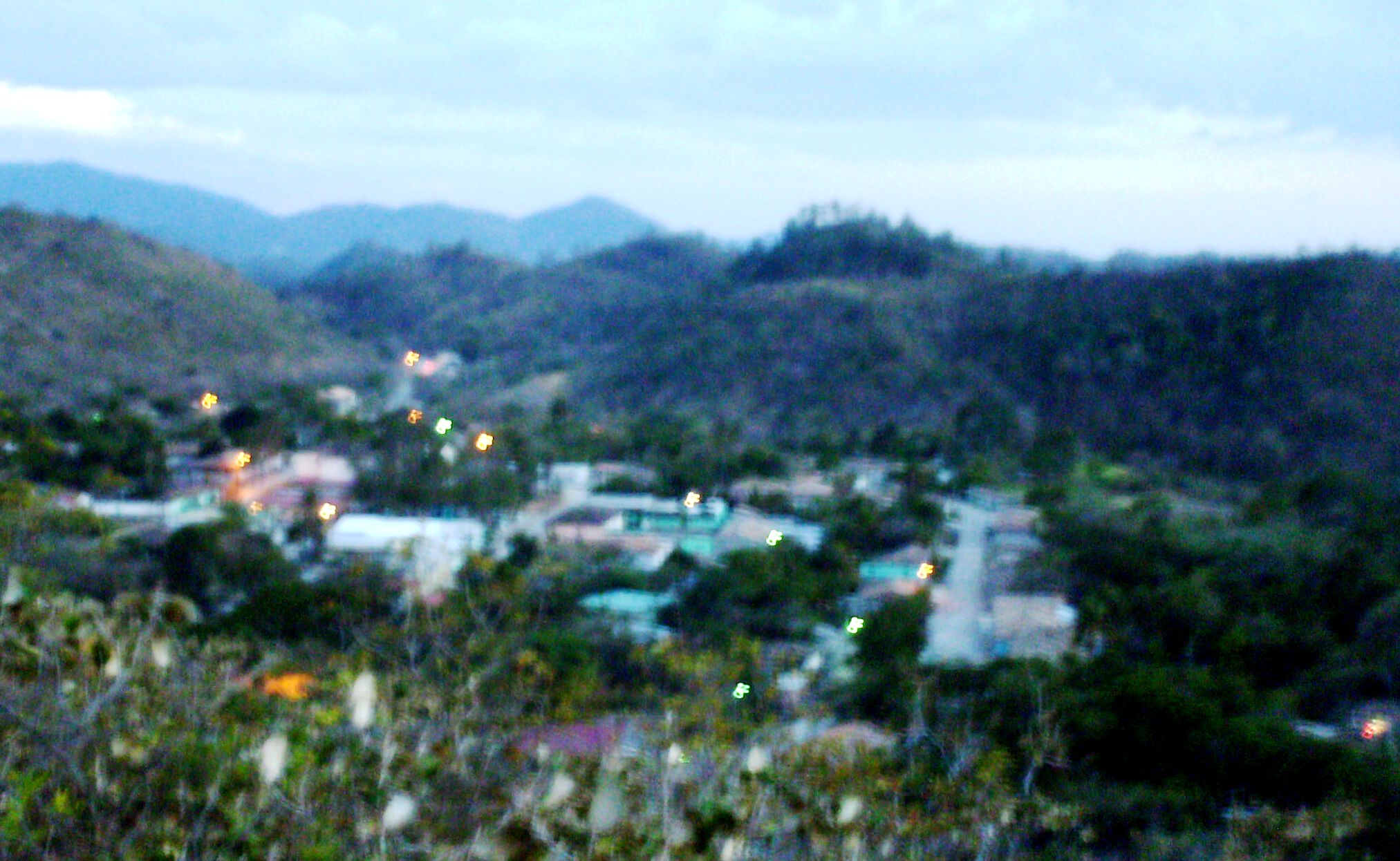
APanoramic View of Town

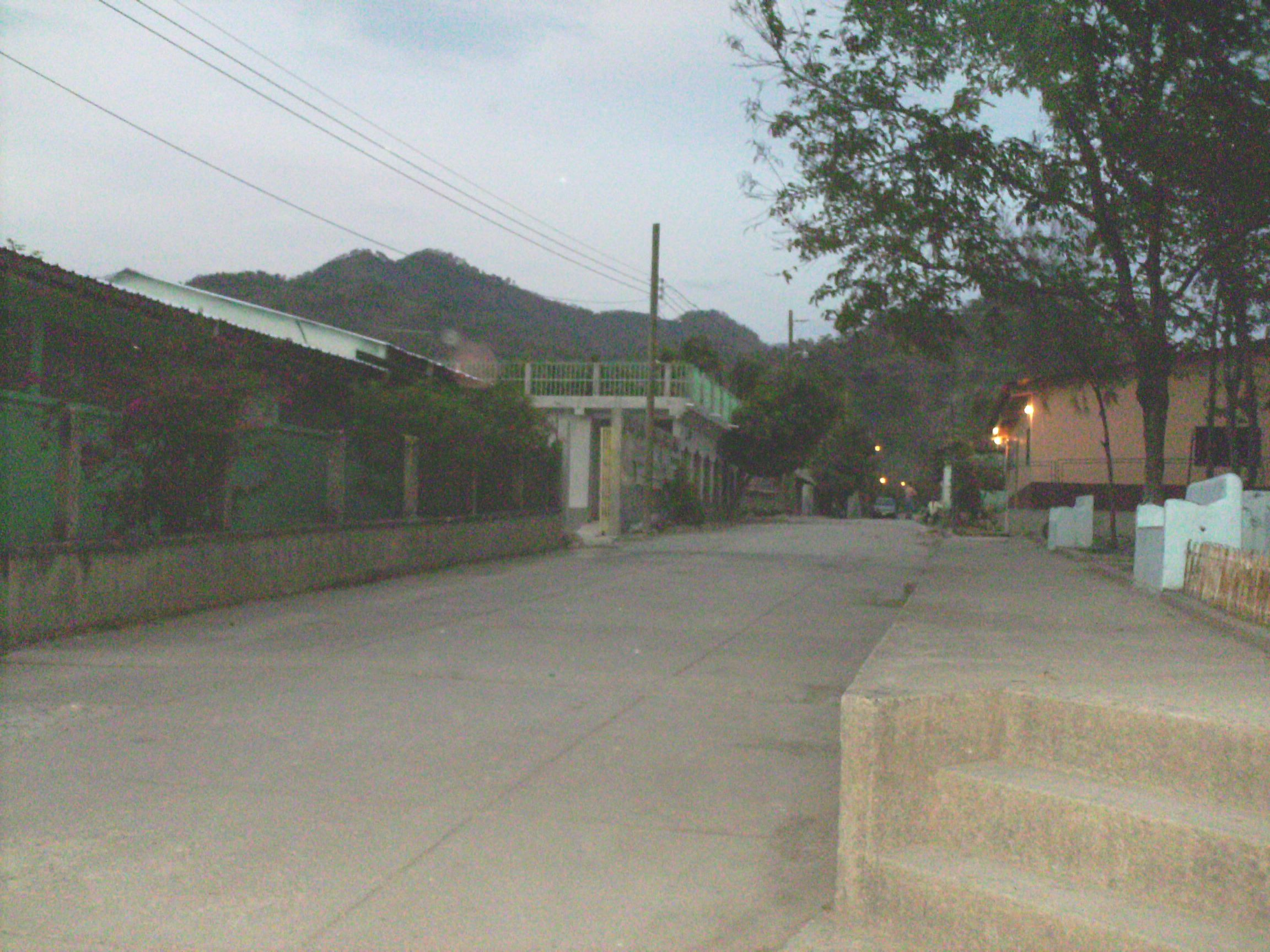
Calle de Cololaca
